= William Overgard =

American novelist

- Born: April 30, 1926 Santa Monica, California, U.S.
- Died: May 25, 1990 (aged 64) Stony Point, New York
- Areas: Cartoonist, Writer, Artist, Letterer
- Notable works: Steve Roper and Mike Nomad; Kerry Drake; Rudy
- Spouse: Gloria
- Children: Tom, Matthew, Jennifer

William Overgard (April 30, 1926 – May 25, 1990), was an American cartoonist and writer with a diverse opus, including novels, screenplays, animation, and the comic strips Steve Roper and Mike Nomad and Rudy.

== Biography ==
=== Early life ===
William Thomas Overgard was born on April 30, 1926, in Santa Monica, California, son of silent-movie actor William A. Overgard, and grew up there. Inspired as a boy by Milton Caniff's Terry and the Pirates, at age twelve he sent him a fan letter and samples of his own art, and received encouragement. They continued corresponding during Overgard's high school years and two years in the Navy during World War II. Afterwards, he headed for New York and worked with Caniff, assisting him on his new strip Steve Canyon. (He later regarded this apprenticeship as his only true training for cartooning.) Then, on Caniff's advice, he launched his own cartooning career in the 1950s with comic books such as Jungle Jim, Ben Bowie, Daredevil, and the western Black Diamond. He also freelanced in ghosted strips and animation, continuing to refine his artwork, and contributed to Boy Magazine and the satirical Whack.

=== Steve Roper ===
In 1954, Steve Roper artist Pete Hoffman was leaving to do his own strip, Jeff Cobb. Overgard "had been trying to get a syndicated gig, and when the Roper job opened up, he was invited to compete with other candidates for the assignment. 'Fortunately,' he wrote, 'I managed to scoot by and win, and that was the beginning of my career as a strip cartoonist.'" The first strip he drew for Steve Roper was for July 12, 1954. When the writer, Allen Saunders, was considering a counterfoil pal for "straight-arrow" Roper, Overgard suggested a character he had been working on and described as "a realistic working-man kind of guy who was not beyond taking any opportunity that presented itself". Thus appeared on June 19, 1956, Mike Nomad, who would ultimately become the protagonist of the strip.

With a family started and the security of Steve Roper, in 1954 Overgard and his wife Gloria "left behind their bohemian Manhattan life" (Traster 2007) and moved up the Hudson to a house on a rural 17-acre (69,000 m^{2}) site in Stony Point, NY, close to friend Caniff's home. He invested much of his earnings over the years in renovating the house (built in 1770) while also indulging a love of antique cars and motorcycles. He did his cartooning and writing at night, except when he and his wife entertained in "artsy soirees" in their home and gardens (Traster, ibid).

In 1963 (May 17), he wrote in Time Magazine that a featured painting by pop artist Roy Lichtenstein "came close" to an August 6, 1961, panel of his Steve Roper. He added: "Very flattering...I think?" He joined the National Cartoonists Society and clearly took pride in his work on the strip, which became Steve Roper and Mike Nomad in 1969, giving it new popularity.

=== Later years and death ===
In 1971 Overgard also took on the scripting of Kerry Drake after Saunders quit, and as that strip ended, began a new one he both wrote and drew, Rudy, which debuted on January 3, 1983. By then, there were disagreements over the writing of Steve Roper with Allen Saunders and son John who succeeded him in 1979. After his strip for April 7, 1985 (not 1982 as sometimes reported), Overgard left Steve Roper, immediately replaced by Fran Matera, and devoted himself to Rudy. Despite favorable reviews, Rudy came to an end later that year on December 22.

Overgard had already expanded into screenplays and televised cartoons, now scripting episodes of ThunderCats. He had also been writing adventure novels, and in 1988 published his last one, A Few Good Men, about the U.S. Marines' 1931 intervention in the Sandinista war in Nicaragua. He continued his longtime interests in antique cars and music-making, especially the banjo. He died in Stony Point on May 25, 1990, survived by wife Gloria, sons Tom and Matthew, daughter Jennifer Magnusson and granddaughter Maja Magnusson, and leaving an archive of his earlier Steve Roper work at Syracuse University.

== Creative work ==
Overgard's fiction includes the novels Moonlight Surveillance, Pieces of a Hero, Once More the Hero, Shanghai Tango, The Evil Chaser, The Divide, The Man from Raffles, and A Few Good Men. His screenplays include The Last Dinosaur (1977), The Bermuda Depths (1978), Ivory Ape (1980), Bushido Blade (1981), and the animated cartoons Silver Hawks and 19 episodes of ThunderCats (airing in the mid-1980s).

He is more remembered for his 31 years (almost half his life) on Steve Roper; "one of the best-drawn and stylish adventure strips", and he varied it with fast-sequence montages, close-ups, and views from different angles. He also did the lettering after 1977, defining the strip's characters and aging them over the years.

Rudy showed similar artwork, but a very different situation. It was launched (in Overgard's own words, 1984) "to the puzzled disbelief of comic traditionalists. A gag strip about a talking monkey in Hollywood, drawn in a realistic continuity style? What?" Rudy was a Bonobo Chimpanzee who otherwise resembled actor George Burns, right down to the cigar, wise cracks, and career in vaudeville, movies, and standup comedy. "Literate and well-drawn." added that it showed smart humor, character-driven stories, intelligent writing and great art that "transcends the run-of-the-mill comic strip level"— all of which (in his opinion) "doomed" it in an era favoring minimalist gag strips.

The 1984 collection of Rudy strips ended with a drawing of its protagonist, sport coat flung over his shoulder and lighting a cigar as he walked away with a simple "Ciao."
