= Fernando Silva =

Fernando Silva may refer to:

- Fernando Silva (badminton) (born 1972), Portuguese badminton player
- Fernando Silva (chess player) (born 1950), Portuguese chess champion in 1975–77, '81 and '87
- Fernando Silva (distance runner) (born 1980), Portuguese distance runner
- Fernando Silva (footballer, born 1948), Brazilian football defender
- Fernando Silva (footballer, born 1977), Andorran football striker
- Fernando Silva (footballer, born 1980), Portuguese football central defender
- Fernando Silva (footballer, born 1991), Brazilian football winger
- Fernando Silva Maqueira (1877–1934), Chilean politician
- Fernando Silva Santisteban (1929–2006), Peruvian historian, anthropologist and professor
- Fernando Silva (sprinter) (born 1952), Portuguese sprint athlete
- Fernando Silva (swimmer) (born 1986), Brazilian swimmer
- Fernando Da Silva (1920–2012), Brazilian artist/illustrator
- Fernando da Silva Cabrita (1923–2014), Portuguese football forward and manager
- Fernándo de Silva (fl. 1600s), Spanish Governor of the Philippines from 1625 to 1626
- Fernando de Silva, 12th Duke of Alba (1714–1776), Duke of Huéscar, Spanish politician and general
- Fernando Paixão da Silva (born 1988), Brazilian football midfielder

== See also ==
- Silva, Portuguese-language surname
