= Publishers Syndicate =

- Formerly: Publishers Newspaper Syndicate
- Industry: Print syndication
- Founded: 1925; 101 years ago
- Founders: Harold H. Anderson and Eugene P. Conley
- Defunct: 1967; 59 years ago
- Fate: merged with Hall Syndicate to form Publishers-Hall Syndicate
- Headquarters: 30 N. LaSalle Street, Chicago, Illinois, U.S.
- Key people: Allen Saunders, Nicholas P. Dallis
- Products: Comic strips, newspaper columns
- Owners: Harold H. Anderson (1925–1963); Field Enterprises (1963–onward)

Publishers Newspaper Syndicate (later Publishers Syndicate) was a syndication service based in Chicago that operated from 1925 to 1967, when it merged with the Hall Syndicate. Publishers syndicated such long-lived comic strips as Big Chief Wahoo/Steve Roper, Mary Worth, Kerry Drake, Rex Morgan, M.D., Judge Parker, and Apartment 3-G.

Allen Saunders served as comics editor in the 1940s and wrote a number of Publishers Syndicate's most popular strips, including Apple Mary/Mary Worth, Big Chief Wahoo, and Kerry Drake. His protege Nicholas P. Dallis followed in Saunders' footsteps by writing the popular strips Rex Morgan, M.D., Judge Parker, and Apartment 3-G.

In addition to comic strips, Publishers syndicated sports columnists such as Red Smith and columnists such as Roscoe Drummond.

Publishers Syndicate was acquired by Field Enterprises in 1963 and merged with the Hall Syndicate in 1967, becoming the Publishers-Hall Syndicate.

== History ==
From 1919 to circa 1925, Chicago-area businessmen Eugene P. Conley and John H. Millar ran a syndication service aimed at teen readers. Called Associated Editors, the syndicate offered among other features the columns and cartoons of Robert Quillen. Associated Editors was dissolved when Millar and Conley went their separate ways. (Millar became the owner of Home News Publishing, a chain of small-town papers.)

The Publishers Syndicate was founded in 1925 by Conley. and Harold H. Anderson Among its first columns were those of Quillen; its first strips were Walt Scott's Dramatic Events in Bible History and John H. Striebel Poor Pa.

Many of Publishers' most popular and long-running strips were launched in the 1930s, including Dan Dunn: Secret Operative 48, Apple Mary (which later became Mary Worth), and Big Chief Wahoo.

Successful Publishers strips launched in the 1940s included Kerry Drake, Dotty Dripple, and Rex Morgan, M.D.; while popular strips originating in the 1950s included Judge Parker, Tales from the Great Book, Friar Justin "Fred" McCarthy's Brother Juniper, and Stan Lee and Dan DeCarlo's Willie Lumpkin. Notable strips launched in the 1960s were Apartment 3-G and The Wizard of Id.

In 1963 Chicago-based Field Enterprises and New York Herald Tribune publisher John Hay Whitney acquired Publishers Syndicate, merging syndication operations with Field's Chicago Sun-Times Syndicate, the New York Herald Tribune Syndicate, and the syndicate of the Chicago Daily News (a newspaper that had been acquired by Field Enterprises in 1959). When the New York Herald Tribune folded in 1966, Publishers inherited their strips, including Johnny Hart's B.C., Mell Lazarus' Miss Peach, and Harry Haenigsen's Penny.

In 1967, Field Enterprises acquired Robert M. Hall's New York-based Hall Syndicate, merging it with Publishers to form the Publishers-Hall Syndicate.

== Publishers Syndicate strips and panels ==
- Apartment 3-G by Nicholas P. Dallis and Alex Kotzky (1960–1967; continues today with King Features Syndicate)
- Apple Mary by Martha Orr and later Allen Saunders and Dale Connor (October 29, 1934–1939)
- Big Chief Wahoo / Steve Roper originally by Allen Saunders and Elmer Woggon (1936–1967; continued until 2004 eventually with King Features)
- Blade Winters by Lafe Thomas (1952–1953)
- Brother Juniper by Friar Justin "Fred" McCarthy (1958–1967; continued until 1989 eventually with King Features)
- Dan Dunn: Secret Operative 48 originally by Norman W. Marsh and Paul Pinson (1933–1943)
- Dotty Dripple by Buford Tune (1944–1967; continued until 1974 by Publishers-Hall Syndicate)
- Dramatic Events in Bible History by Walt Scott (1927–1929)
- Dudley D. by Dave Gantz (1963–1964) — acquired from New York Herald Tribune Syndicate (1961–1962)
- Judge Parker by Nicholas P. Dallis and Dan Heilman (1952–1967; continues today with King Features)
- Kerry Drake by Allen Saunders (uncredited) and Alfred Andriola (1943-1967; continued until 1983 eventually with King Features)
- Mary Worth by "Dale Allen" (Allen Saunders and Dale Connor) (1938–1967; continues today with King Features)
- Pauline McPeril by Jack Rickard and Mell Lazarus (1966–1967; continued until 1969 by Publishers-Hall)
- Poor Pa (1926–1955) illustrated by John H. Striebel; originally written by Robert Quillen; soon taken over by Claude Callan
- Rex Morgan, M.D. originally by Nicholas P. Dallis, Marvin Bradley & John Frank Edgington (1948–1967; continues today with King Features)
- Ruth & Roxy by Paul Rhymer and illustrated by Hugh Chenoweth (1939)
- Tales from the Great Book by John Lehti (1954–1967; continued until 1972 with Publishers-Hall)
- Willie Lumpkin by Stan Lee and Dan DeCarlo (Dec. 1959 – May 28, 1961)
- The Wizard of Id by Brant Parker and Johnny Hart (1964–1967; continues today with Creators Syndicate)
