= Ken Ernst =

American cartoonist (1918–1985)

On February 5, 1947, Ken Ernst chose University of Wisconsin student Ruth Schmitt as the model for a new character in his Mary Worth comic strip.

Kenneth Frederick Ernst (1918 – August 6, 1985) was a US comic book and comic strip artist. He is most notable for his work on the popular and long-running comic strip Mary Worth from 1942 to 1985. With his realistic style, uncommon in those early years, Ernst paved the way for soap opera strips that followed.

== Biography ==
=== Early years ===
Ken Ernst was born in 1918 in Illinois. At the age of 12, he was elected president of the Chicago Chapter of the International Brotherhood of Magicians. Ernst began his working life as a stage magician, but he aimed for a career in art. Using money made performing magic to finance his education, he studied at the Art Institute of Chicago and the Chicago Academy of Fine Arts.

=== Comic books ===
In 1936, Ernst began his art career during the burgeoning Golden Age of Comic Books. He joined the Harry "A" Chesler comic book production shop, where he contributed to Star Comics and Funny Pages until 1943. He took assignments on numerous titles from Centaur in the late 1930s. Ernst also worked for National Periodical Publications on Larry Steele and at Western Publishing on Buck Jones, Tom Mix and Clyde Beatty. He is credited with the art on back-up stories in the DC Comics flagship title Detective Comics, issues 31–33, 38, and most issues between 39 and 49.

Ernst's artwork appeared in comic books again in the late 1940s and early 1950s in The Green Hornet from Harvey Comics, but the panels were reprints of his Mary Worth.

=== Comic strips ===
It was in the field of newspaper comics, however, that Ken Ernst became famous. Between 1940 and 1942, he assisted on the daily Don Winslow of the Navy strip. (Another source reports that he "ghosted" that strip).

In 1942, Ernst took over as artist on the King Features Syndicate comic strip Mary Worth, and that strip became his life's work. According to Ernst in a comic-style segment from the January 8, 1949 issue of Collier's ("Mary Worth and Us" by Ken Ernst and Allen Saunders, p. 45), he and writer Allen Saunders replaced the "tear-stained melodrama" of Apple Mary, the strip's previous incarnation, with more "modern material-- stuff that might appear in slick paper fiction." The new approach brought success, as well as a succession of Ernst's gorgeously drawn, but often troubled females into range of Mary's meddling and advice. "I have to grind out a new honey every few weeks, instead of drawing the same face every day for 20 years," Ernst remarked.

Ernst rendered the strip in a realistic style "inspired by that of his mentors Milton Caniff and Noel Sickles." His Mary Worth became a prototype for the "gentle and sophisticated" soap opera strip. Eminent comic strip historian Coulton Waugh made note of Ernst's "smooth, smart, dressy, modern style." Waugh also admired Ernst's device of drawing a group of characters in a panel without any background and—through clever use of shadow—making the figures appear to leap out of the panel.

== Legacy ==
In terms of style, later strips such as Rex Morgan, M.D., Judge Parker, The Heart of Juliet Jones and Apartment 3-G among others are said to have followed Ernst's lead.

The Wisconsin Historical Society possesses some black and white photographs of Ernst sketching female students at the University of Wisconsin on February 5, 1947. Ernst is said to have chosen one of the young women to serve as the model for a new character in Mary Worth. Seven related images were published in the Wisconsin State Journal on February 9, 1947.

Ken Ernst illustrated the Mary Worth strip until the time of his death. He died August 6, 1985, of a heart attack, while visiting his son in Salem, Oregon.
