= Bruce Gentry =

Bruce Gentry may refer to:

- Bruce Gentry (comics), an aviation adventure comic strip
- Bruce Gentry – Daredevil of the Skies, a 1949 movie serial based on the comic strip
