= Bill Woggon =

American cartoonist

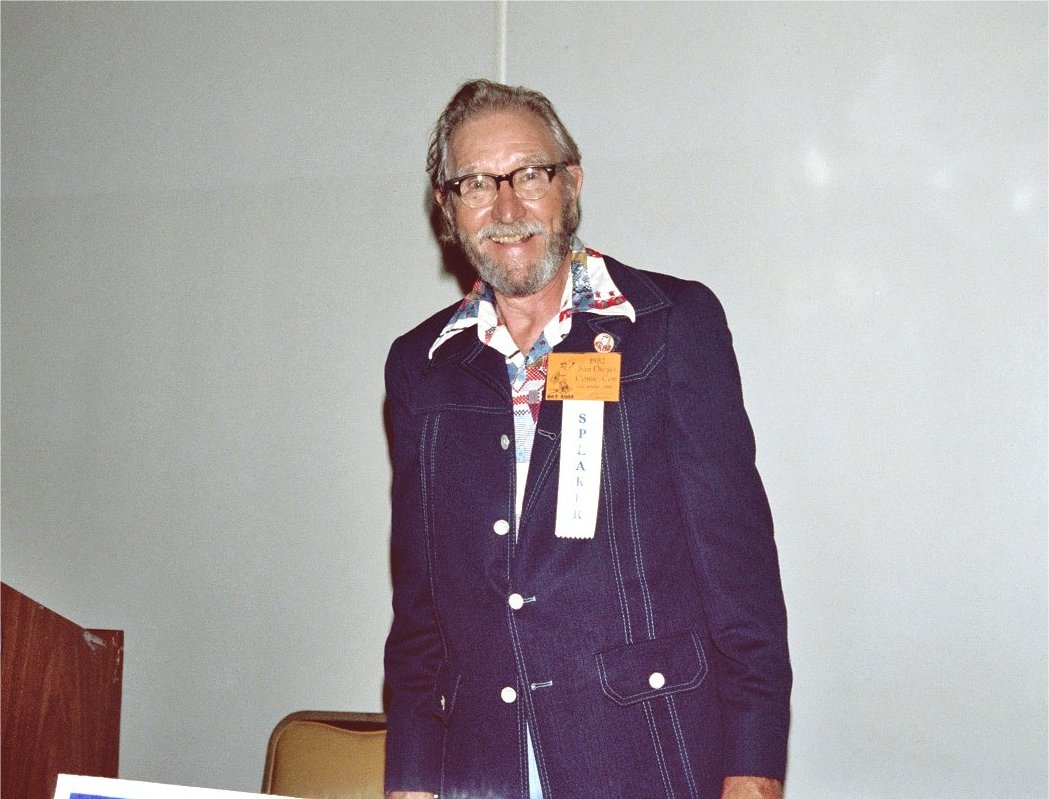
- Bill Woggon at the 1982 San Diego Comic Con.
- Born: William Woggon; January 1, 1911 Toledo, Ohio, U.S.
- Died: March 2, 2003 (aged 92)
- Areas: Cartoonist, Writer, Artist
- Notable works: Katy Keene
- Awards: Inkpot Award, 1981, 2015 Will Eisner Award

William Woggon (January 1, 1911 – March 2, 2003) was an American cartoonist who created the comic book Katy Keene.

Woggon was born the fourth of six children in Toledo, Ohio, and he grew up there. Fascinated by an art correspondence course that his older brother Elmer Woggon was taking, he became interested in drawing. At 16, he took a job in a department store as a commercial artist, and then did the same kind of work at the Toledo Blade, where Elmer worked.

== Comic strips ==
By 1938, he was assisting Elmer in lettering and then drawing the latter's newspaper comic strip Big Chief Wahoo, which later metamorphosed into Steve Roper and Mike Nomad. According to the strip's writer, Allen Saunders, they were unable to keep him as a full-time Big Chief Wahoo staffer.

== Comic books ==
Bill Woggon kept working on his own ideas for a comic book. Inspired by wartime pinup girls, in 1945, he created Katy Keene, beginning in Wilbur Comics and taking advantage of its teen market. It became a success during the next ten years, spawning fan clubs and pen pals.

Katy Keene featured fashionable young beauty Katy (a model with "traditional values"), who had a pestering little sister, a stream of suitors and dreams of becoming an actress. The stories were not overly inspired and mainly served to put Katy through as many successive wardrobe changes as possible in order to show off reader-submitted fashions that Woggon drew and credited to them (a feature adopted by Dixie Dugan as well). Paper dolls with other outfits for Katy also increased the comic's appeal. It continued through the 1950s in various outlets (Katy Keene Pinup Parade, Laugh Comics, and Pep Comics, and Archie Comics). When it ended in 1961, Woggon turned to other work, such as the Dell comic Millie the Lovable Monster, ghosting the newspaper strip Priscilla's Pop and creating the Archie feature The Twiddles.

With the success of Katy Keene, Woggon and his wife Jane moved their family in 1948 to California, where they bought a spread near Santa Barbara. At the same time, Katy also moved from New York City to California.

Woggon was visited by his admirers, including Floyd Norman, Trina Robbins and John S. Lucas. With Woggon's blessing, Lucas was asked by Michael Silberkleit and Richard Goldwater to do the art on the Archie Comics revival of Katy Keene. Katy Keene inspired a generation of serious fashion designers, including Betsey Johnson. In his later years, Woggon illustrated Christian literature for children (e.g., coloring books such as Let's Read and Color, 1988).

== Awards ==
In 1981, his work was recognized with an Inkpot Award. He received accolades not only from his fans but also from his family who cited him as "a great dad".
