= Elmer Woggon =

American cartoonist

- Born: November 4, 1898 Toledo, Ohio, U.S.
- Died: April 1978 (aged 79)
- Areas: Cartoonist, Artist
- Pseudonym: Wog
- Notable works: Big Chief Wahoo
- Collaborators: Allen Saunders
- Awards: Inkpot Award, 1978

Elmer Woggon (November 4, 1898 – April 1978), who signed his art Wog, was the creator of an early newspaper comic strip that eventually developed into the long-running Steve Roper and Mike Nomad.

== Biography ==
Born and raised in Toledo, Ohio, Woggon was interested as a child in American Indians. Developing his drawing skills through the Federal School cartoon correspondence course, he got a job at The Toledo Blade as cartoonist, commercial artist and eventually art editor. With the American public's fascination after World War I with airplanes and daring aviators, in 1929 he tried an aviation-themed comic strip called Skylark. It failed "because its creator had never been in a plane".

=== Woggon's Wahoo ===
Woggon then tried a gag strip, encouraged by Publishers Syndicate to base it on a comical "windbag" (Waugh). He drafted samples he titled The Great Gusto, featuring opportunistic medicine-show impresario J. Mortimer Gusto (Saunders, ibid), and in 1935 he enlisted as his writer Allen Saunders, a reporter at the rival News-Bee across the street. But their proposal and advance publicity were not accepted until they took the syndicate's advice to focus instead on Gusto's "cute" Indian sidekick, Chief Wahoo. This character, with his diminutive stature and 10-gallon hat, had little resemblance to the Cleveland Indians' mascot Chief Wahoo dating from 1946, but scholars have assumed the mascot came from the comic character.

At last syndicated, Big Chief Wahoo took off in the newspapers on November 23, 1936, opening with Wahoo receiving a letter from his girlfriend Minnie Ha-Cha in New York and rushing to her. On the way (six days into the strip), he encountered Gusto, who now played second fiddle to Wahoo. The strip quickly became a hit, adding features such as reader-submitted "Indian slango" (e.g., credit = 'trustum-bustum') and spinning off products such as Wahoo chewing gum, coloring books and paper dolls. In fact, according to Saunders (ibid), their "sawed-off Seminole" (Wahoo was actually from the Southwest, not Florida) almost got into animated cartoons. The authors soon left their newspaper jobs as full-time authors of Big Chief Wahoo, taking a studio in downtown Toledo, and both joined the National Cartoonists Society.

However, Woggon's "bigfoot" comic art style was not up to the strip's increasingly serious stories and wide-ranging settings. According to Harvey, this was a common problem for cartoonists faced with the era's transition to photorealism in adventure strips. As early as 1938, ghost artists were being called in for Big Chief Wahoo: Woggon's kid brother Bill Woggon, Marvin Bradley, Don Dean, and (in 1945) Pete Hoffman. This resulted in a jarringly inconsistent look as each ghost filled in around Woggon's Wahoo and Gusto figures, eventually took over the whole strip for a while, and then left for other strips.

With success, Elmer Woggon acquired a new home at 1650 North Cove Boulevard in Toledo, but on February 21, 1942, thieves ripped out a bay window of the house and made off with the refrigerator, bathroom fixtures and parts of an electric stove. Woggon estimated the loss at $500.

Elmer Woggon's role as ghosted artist finally ended in 1954, when William Overgard took over as the strip's credited artist and imposed a consistent, attractively realistic look. Meanwhile, Saunders had delicately written out Woggon's early cartoonish figures (Gusto, Oscar the Octopus, Mooseface, horse Ammonia) to focus on a new character, a handsome young reporter named Steve Roper who on March 23, 1940, flew his plane into Wahoo's town (Woggon got his aviator) to get a story, and helped in a rescue mission. Wahoo joined him in his adventures, but as the strip followed Roper's career, Wahoo and Minnie (the only surviving members of the original cast) were increasingly out of place and were written out in 1947. The strip then became Steve Roper (and in 1969, Steve Roper and Mike Nomad). Wahoo and Gusto were never seen or mentioned again, except in a special Christmas 1976 strip that Overgard drew of the "Steve Roper Clan," picturing himself, Allen Saunders and son John, and Woggon with Roper, Nomad, Wahoo, Minnie and Gusto.

== Awards ==
Woggon continued as the strip's researcher and letterer, and according to Saunders, he took his strip's complete transformation in good grace. During the 1960s, he moved to Fort Lauderdale, Florida, where he recovered from an appendectomy in March 1968. He died in Fort Lauderdale in 1978, finally recognized for his work by an Inkpot Award that same year.

== Sources ==
- Harvey, R. C. 1994. The Art of the Funnies. University Press of Mississippi.
- Harvey, R. C. 2004. Rants and Raves, opus 149.
- Waugh, Coulton. 1947. The Comics. University Press of Mississippi.
