= Steve Roper and Mike Nomad =

American comic strip (1936–2004)

- Author: Allen Saunders (1936–1979); John Saunders (1979–November 15, 2003)
- Illustrator(s): Elmer Woggon (1936–c. 1944); Pete Hoffman (Dec. 1945–July 1954); William Overgard (July 12, 1954–April 7, 1985); Fran Matera (1985–2004)
- Current status/schedule: Daily and Sunday; concluded
- Launch date: November 23, 1936
- End date: December 26, 2004
- Alternate name(s): Big Chief Wahoo (1936–1945); Chief Wahoo and Steve Roper (1945–1946); Steve Roper and Wahoo (1946–1948); Steve Roper (1948–1969); Steve Roper and Mike Nomad (1969–2004)
- Syndicate(s): Publishers Syndicate; Field Syndicate; King Features Syndicate
- Genre: adventure

The meeting of Steve Roper with Chief Wahoo and Minnie Ha-Cha, as reprinted in Famous Funnies #89 (December 1941)

Steve Roper and Mike Nomad was an American adventure comic strip that ran under various titles from November 23, 1936, to December 26, 2004. Originally Big Chief Wahoo, the focus and title character of the strip changed over time to Chief Wahoo (1940–1945), Chief Wahoo and Steve Roper (1945–1946), Steve Roper and Wahoo (1946–1948), Steve Roper (1948–1969) and finally Steve Roper and Mike Nomad (1969–2004).

It was initially distributed by Publishers Syndicate, then by Field Newspaper Syndicate, before concluding at King Features Syndicate. Despite the changes in title, characters, themes, and authors, the entire 68-year run formed a single evolving story, from an Indian who teamed up with an adventurous young photojournalist to two long-time friends ready to retire after their long, eventful careers.

Created by Allen Saunders and Elmer Woggon, the strip was written by Saunders for more than forty years until it was taken over by his son John Saunders, who wrote it for another 24 years. Woggon illustrated the strip from its inception until the mid-1940s; other artists who spent considerable time on the strip included Pete Hoffman (11 years), William Overgard (31 years), and Fran Matera (19 years).

== Origins ==
The strip was originally proposed by Elmer Woggon as The Great Gusto, illustrated by himself and written by Allen Saunders (who would also write Mary Worth and Kerry Drake). J. Mortimer Gusto was a freeloading opportunist based on the film persona of W.C. Fields. In his autobiography, Saunders said Fields was flattered. However, the syndicate preferred his sidekick Wahoo. The proposal was revamped to center on this sidekick, and the strip debuted on November 23, 1936, as Big Chief Wahoo.

Whitman Publishing produced three "Big Chief Wahoo" Big Little Books: Big Chief Wahoo (1938), Big Chief Wahoo and the Magic Lamp (1940) and Big Chief Wahoo and the Lost Pioneers (1942).

== Characters and story ==
Wahoo was a short Native American in a ten-gallon hat who was played for laughs but showed courage, loyalty, and common sense. It was white people who were often the targets of the jokes, and the strip made vigorous defences of Native Americans. Wahoo, rich from discovering oil on his land back in Te-e-pee Town (spelled both ways in the strip), headed to New York City to find his girlfriend Minnie Ha-Cha, who had gone away to college and was now a nightclub singer. On the way, Wahoo was joined by Gusto, who continued as a support character through August 1939. Other original characters included Pigtails ("44 pounds of dynamite wrapped in calico!") and Lulu Hipps ("The bee-utiful belle of the boarding-house").

The strip initially revolved around humorous tales, such as stories about people trying to cheat Wahoo out of his money or fish-out-of-water tales of Wahoo in New York or Hollywood. From the beginning, the storyline maintained continuity, and had already moved into serious adventure by 1940 when a dashing young photojournalist named Steve Roper was introduced. By World War II, Roper was the lead in war-oriented adventures, and the strip was retitled Chief Wahoo and Steve Roper in 1945. The strip was rebranded many times in the following years, secondly as Steve Roper and Wahoo in 1946, and finally in 1948 as Steve Roper. Wahoo and Minnie were written out on February 21 and November 19, 1947, respectively. As the strip took on many different characters and backgrounds, its artwork changed; Some of the artists include Woggon's brother Bill Woggon, Don Dean, and (from December 1945 to July 1954) Pete Hoffman. Woggon remained the strip's letterer and researcher until sometime in 1975. He later passed in 1978.

== 1946–1970 ==
After his World War II service in Navy intelligence, Roper got a job at Spotshot magazine (renamed Spotlight in 1950), and from then on the main action was set in New York City. As good with his fists as with his cameras and typewriter, he built a reputation as a racket-busting ace reporter and editor. The strip's popularity grew: after the March 1948 birth of a son to Roper's friends Sonny and Cupcake Brawnski, there was a national write-in of suggested names from readers.

In 1951, Steve got engaged to his boss Kit Karson, but when he was framed on a story in 1953 and broke jail, she abandoned him. Vindicating himself in a major crime ring bust, he was snapped up by the competition, crusty Major J. Calhoun McCoy at Tell magazine (soon renamed Proof). He continued exposing crimes and frauds, but his sense of moral outrage kept landing him in fiendish criminal traps that nearly finished him and some of the crooks he sent to prison with his exposés came back for revenge.

On July 12, 1954, the artwork was taken over by William Overgard, who on June 17, 1956, introduced a character whom he had tried unsuccessfully to feature in a strip of his own. Mike Nomad had served in World War II as a U.S Marine commando. After working in oil fields, he looked up Roper to verify his Proof magazine photo of a smuggler he thought he had killed. They solved the case together, and then Roper got him a job at Proof as a truck driver. In 1962, Nomad got his own room over the restaurant of Chinese wisdom-quoting Ma Jong, and she became a permanent member of the cast as his landlady.

The two men were different: pipe-smoking Roper was a fast-thinking, stylish, college-educated "straight arrow", while flat-topped Nomad was a tough, street-smart antihero, loyal but not averse to deceiving, and impulsive. Their friendship and interaction as men became a lasting theme of the strip. In the next 25 years, they alternated or joined forces in stories about people whose problems often drove them to crime. The dual protagonists were recognized in April 1969 by the last name change, Steve Roper & Mike Nomad.

== 1970–2004 ==
In February 1970, Roper was promoted by McCoy to editor-in-chief at Consolidated Publications, Inc., though he continued to carry out investigative reporting. Then, in August 1976, in his late forties, he married a young reporter, Trudy Hale. Meanwhile, Nomad, who remained single, despite four close calls, was laid off from Proof and got new jobs, with new dangers, as a cab driver (1976) and then independent trucker (1981). In 1983, Roper lost his wife (traumatized in an explosion, committed to a mental hospital, and soon divorcing him), got fired for taking dangerous risks in an exposé of political bribes, and then moved to Florida to make a new start as a TV news anchor.

In 1979, Allen Saunders retired and gave the writing of Steve Roper and Mary Worth to his son John Saunders, a Toledo TV broadcaster who sometimes assisted him. There has been conflicting information on this transition. John (1986) said he had helped since 1949 and had done the "writing chores" since the early 1950s; and in its release on his death in 2003, King Features Syndicate (in turn cited by Markstein) said he had had "full responsibility" over Steve Roper since 1955. This claim is not supported in Allen's own candid discussions of "the strips that I write" (articles in 1953, 1971, and 1983–1985 autobiography), and the scripting continued to show his unique writing style, characterization, and plotting until 1979. The strip itself first acknowledged John as assistant on December 25, 1976, and as the writer on October 28, 1979. As the obituary in his hometown newspaper (Toledo Blade, 2003) put it, "John Saunders began working on the strips (i.e., Steve Roper and Mary Worth) periodically during the 1950s, but took over in 1979."

In early 1985 Overgard left to focus on his own comic Rudy and other work, and the artwork was then taken over by Fran Matera. The strip was now focused on Nomad, who won a state lottery and was cajoled into a detective business with cop Francis Hogan (1989). Their main client (beginning December 1991) was a motel chain owner, the inimitable Emma Stopp. Nomad got engaged to social worker Meg Carey, a relationship that ended in 2000. Meanwhile, Roper retired in Florida and was kept out of sight for ten years. But in 1997 he returned. Tired of journalism, he joined Nomad and Hogan in detective work, and by the end of the strip he had again become the leading character. John Saunders continued to write the strip until his death on November 15, 2003. Officially, Matera took over the writing until it was discontinued by the syndicate. In the strip's last days the dailies featured stories involving Mike, while the Sundays focused on Steve. It has been reported that the dailies of that period were combinations of reprinted and some new art, remaking older stories.

== Sources ==
- Ridgeway, Ann N. (interviewer). 1971. Allen Saunders. The Journal of Popular Culture 5 (2), 385-420.
- Brandenburg, George A. 1949. Soap Opera in Comics? Never, Says Saunders. Reprinted in Stripper's Guide May 2007.
- Harvey, R. C. 2004. Rants and Raves, opus 149.
- The Toledo Blade. 1953. Seymour Rothman, "Evolution of a Comic Strip," Pictorial, August 9, 1953, p. 5-6. Reprinted in Steve Roper and Wahoo, Blackthorne Publishing, book 2 (1987).
- Obituaries: John P. Saunders 1924-2003. The Toledo Blade. November 17, 2003.
- Saunders, John. 1986 (and 1987). Foreword to Steve Roper and Wahoo. Blackthorne Publishing, books 1 and 2.
- Browne Popular Culture Library News. 2007. Allen and John Saunders Collection, March 17, 2007.
