= Margaret Shulock =

American cartoonist, born 1950

- Born: Margaret Ackerman; 27 September 1949 Canastota, New York
- Died: 17 October 2021 (aged 72)
- Areas: Cartoonist, Writer
- Notable works: Sticks; Six Chix; Apartment 3-G (writer)

Margaret Shulock (September 27, 1949 – October 17, 2021) was an American cartoonist who worked as a writer-artist on several features.

Born in Canastota, New York, as Margaret Ackerman, she lived in Franklinville, Buffalo, and Friendship, New York. She began sending weekly, hand-drawn postcards to her parents, often in the form of cartoons. In 1995, these cartoons became Sticks, a self-published calendar and a twice-weekly single-panel cartoon in the Olean Times Herald.

From January 2000 until her retirement in March 2017, Shulock was a once-a-week cartoonist for the ensemble comic Six Chix, a collaborative comic strip that debuted in January 2000 and is syndicated in over 120 newspapers. It is drawn by six female cartoonists who rotate the drawing duties through the week. During her tenure on Six Chix, Shulock wrote and drew the strip each Tuesday and also every sixth Sunday. Shulock also scripted (but did not draw) the daily continuity strip Apartment 3-G from 2007 until its cancellation in November 2015, and around the same time was an uncredited contributing gag writer to the long-running comic Barney Google and Snuffy Smith.
