= Big Little Book series =

1930s–1960s American children's book series

Darrell McClure's Little Annie Rooney on the Highway to Adventure (Whitman, 1935)

The Big Little Books, first published during 1932 by the Whitman Publishing Company of Racine, Wisconsin, were small, compact books designed with a captioned illustration opposite each page of text. Other publishers, notably Saalfield, adopted this format after Whitman achieved success with its early titles, priced initially at 10¢ each, later rising to 15¢.

== Format ==
A Big Little Book was typically 3 5/8 in (92 mm) wide and 4 1/2 in (110 mm) high, with 212 to 432 pages making an approximate thickness of 1 1/2 in (38 mm). The interior book design usually displayed full-page black-and-white illustrations on the right side, facing the pages of text on the left. Stories were often related to radio programs (The Shadow), comic strips (The Gumps), children's books (Uncle Wiggily), novels (John Carter of Mars) and movies (Bambi). Later books of the series had interior color illustrations.

== History ==
After the first Big Little Book, The Adventures of Dick Tracy, was published (December 1932), numerous titles were sold through Woolworth's and other retail store systems during the 1930s. With a name change to Better Little Books during 1938, the series continued into the 1960s. Variations such as Dime Action Books were produced by other publishers, as noted by the Collecting Channel's Andy Hooper:

While the format was pioneered by Whitman Publishing, other firms produced big little books between 1934 and 1960: Dell Comics (Cartoon Story Books e Fast-Action Stories); Engel van Wiseman (Five-Star Library Books); Fawcett (Dime Action Books); Goldsmith (Radio Star Series); Lynn (A Lynn Book); Ottenheimer; Saalfield (Little Big Books e Jumbo Books); Waldman (Moby Books) e World Syndicate (High Lights of History Series). Whitman was also the last to abandon the form, publishing big little books about boomer characters like Major Matt Mason into the mid-1960s. Not all big little books adhered to the original format of text on the left side and a large graphic on the right of each page spread, and the earlier, more heavily illustrated books are more valuable as a result... Dick Tracy was the hero of the first big little book, and he was followed by almost every major cartoon, comic and radio character of the 1930s, including Alley Oop, Buck Rogers, Blondie and Dagwood, Li'l Abner, Mickey Mouse, Popeye, Captain Midnight, Tarzan and dozens more. There were also numerous books published that featured original characters created particularly for the Big Little series, and those are now little remembered, usually selling for $10 or less each in any condition. A few titles were ostensibly non-fiction works about famous people, as with Whitman's Billy The Kid (1935) and The Story of Jackie Cooper (1933), which proves that biographies of child movie stars are no recent phenomenon.

Recently, Robert Thibadeau's project at Carnegie Mellon University has made at least two Big Little Books available online. Thibadeau attempts to "capture the entire production" of an old book with facsimile images showing pages with wear and tear. "We're basically trying to eternalize that book as it is," says Thibadeau. The Antique Books Digital Library offers two free Big Little Book titles, Tim McCoy on the Tomahawk Trail and Bronc Peeler The Lone Cowboy. Fred Harman's Bronc Peeler was a Western comic strip character who was a precursor to another comic strip drawn by Harman, the more successful Red Ryder.

== Mighty Midgets ==
From 1939, the British Woolworth's sold "Mighty Midgets", 32-page books that measured 3 3/4 by 2 1/2 in (95 by 64 mm) and were sold at the artificially low price of threepence; the price subsidised by a full page advertisement on the back.

== In popular culture ==
Sam Mendes' film Road to Perdition (2002) showed a boy reading The Lone Ranger Big Little Book, but this was an anachronism since the movie is set during 1931, a year prior to the first Big Little Books and two years before The Lone Ranger premiered January 31, 1933 ,on radio.
