= Alex Kotzky =

American cartoonist (1923–1996)

- Born: September 11, 1923 New York City, U.S.
- Died: September 26, 1996 (aged 73)
- Areas: Cartoonist, Writer, Artist
- Notable works: Apartment 3-G (1961–1996)
- Collaborators: Nicholas P. Dallis (1961–1991)
- Awards: National Cartoonists Society Story Comic Strip Award (1968)
- Children: Brian Kotzky

Alex Kotzky (September 11, 1923 – September 26, 1996) was a cartoonist best known for his three decades of work on the comic strip Apartment 3-G, originally distributed by Publishers Syndicate.

== Biography ==
=== Early life and education ===
Born in New York City, Kotzky studied at Pratt Institute and attended the Art Students League on a 1941 scholarship. While still a student, he answered a newspaper ad for a comic book artist and worked in 1940 with Chad Grothkopf on features for National/DC Comics, including such characters as Johnny Quick, Sandman, Three Aces and Detective Chimp.

=== Comics ===
While working on Blackhawk and Espionage, he drew backgrounds for Will Eisner's The Spirit. He worked on Plastic Man, Doll Man, Kid Eternity and Manhunter for Quality Comics from 1946 to 1951. He drew horror, Western, and war comics for Ziff-Davis Comics.

Freelancing in 1954, he did illustrations for medical magazines and the Johnstone and Cushing ad agency. He also did at least two booklets for Will Eisner's American Visuals, the General Motors Informational Rack Booklet GM-IR-56-35: "The Story of the Olympics," and American Trucking Association's "Heroes of the Highways." With Allen Saunders, he did a Philip Morris comic strip advertisement series, "Duke" Handy (which launched March 30, 1958, and ran until September 14 of that year) while also ghosting for newspaper strips (Steve Canyon, The Heart of Juliet Jones, Big Ben Bolt).

In 1955/56 he did interior illustrations for the Ziff-Davis science fiction magazines If and Amazing Stories.

Kotzky and writer Nicholas P. Dallis launched Apartment 3-G in 1961. Kotzky, who drew and inked in a tight and crisp realistic style, was the artist of Apartment 3-G for more than 30 years. When Dallis died in 1991, Kotzky began writing the strip.

After a struggle with kidney disease, Kotzky died in 1996. The strip was continued by Kotzky's son, Brian, with writer Lisa Trusiani.

== Awards ==
Kotzky received the National Cartoonists Society Story Comic Strip Award for 1968 for his work on Apartment 3-G.
