= Batman: Turning Points =

Comic limited series

- Cover of Batman: Turning Points trade paperback, art by Tim Sale.

Publication information
- Publisher: DC Comics
- Schedule: Monthly
- Format: Limited series
- Genre: Superhero
- Publication date: January 2001
- No. of issues: 5
- Main character(s): Batman; Jim Gordon

Creative team
- Written by: Greg Rucka; Ed Brubaker; Chuck Dixon
- Artists: Steve Lieber; Joe Giella; Dick Giordano; Brent Anderson; Paul Pope; Claude St. Aubin

Batman: Turning Points is a five-issue Batman limited series, exploring the progression of the relationship between Batman and Commissioner James Gordon, and serving as a prologue to "Officer Down", a storyline leading to Gordon's initial retirement from the police force. The story is written by Greg Rucka, Ed Brubaker, and Chuck Dixon, with art by Steve Lieber, Joe Giella, Dick Giordano, Brent Anderson, Paul Pope, and Claude St. Aubin. It was published in 2001 and collected into a trade paperback in 2007.

One reviewer described it as a sort of anthology, with multiple writers and artists.

== Plot ==
=== Uneasy Allies ===
After the events of Batman: Year One, Captain James Gordon misses a session with a marriage counselor again. When he finally returns home, he finds divorce papers filed by his wife, Barbara Kean Gordon. In addition to filing for divorce, she takes their newborn son back to Chicago.

Elsewhere, Dr. Hale Corbett from Gotham State University is holding hostages in Gotham's Saint Frances Cathedral. He has been driven mad by the deaths of his wife and son, who were killed in an automobile accident earlier that morning. Gordon tries to negotiate with the professor, by relating to him as he also just lost his own family. Batman overhears them from the shadows. Batman and Gordon, working together, manage to subdue the grieving man and save the hostages.

Gordon returns to his empty apartment, and finds Batman reading the divorce papers. Batman visits to see how Gordon is holding up after his divorce. Gordon is upset by Batman's sympathy, because he thinks that the Dark Knight could not possibly understand what it is like to lose a family. Batman leaves, but not before replying that he knows what it is like more than the detective thinks.

=== ...And Then There Are...Three? ===
After the events of Batman: Dark Victory and before Robin: Year One, Captain Gordon meets Robin for the first time after apprehending Mr. Freeze.

=== Casualties of War ===
Set after the events of Batman: The Killing Joke and Batman: A Death in the Family, Batman and Gordon struggle to find peace after what happened to their loved ones, Barbara Gordon and Jason Todd, to the point where Batman briefly contemplates cutting off contact with Gordon to focus on the mission until Barbara helps him see that doing that would only cause further harm to his friend.

=== The Ultimate Betrayal ===
Set during the events of the Knightfall saga, as the Commissioner is beginning to realize that the man beneath the cape and cowl is not the original Batman, and this suspicion is confirmed after a conversation with Bane. This leads Gordon to begin losing his trust in the Dark Knight.

=== Comrades in Arms ===
Set after the events of No Man's Land, at Gotham's Archie Goodwin International Airport, Dr. Hale Corbett returns on vacation to Gotham City with his new family (his wife, Dr. Leslie Becker Corbett and his daughter, Dina) after years moving to California. Batman and Gordon suspect the professor's return is to seek revenge on both of them after what had happened at Saint Frances Cathedral ten years previously. It turned out he only come to show his gratitude to the two of them, giving him the chance to start a new life after the deaths of his first wife and son, and also to fulfill the promise he made to his daughter of meeting a superhero. After Dr. Corbett and his family leave, both men are proud that they made at least one difference to the people that they swore to serve and protect.
