= Sururi Gümen =

Sururi Gümen (July 20, 1920 – September 20, 2000) was a Turkish American illustrator. For many years he was an uncredited ghost artist behind Alfred Andriola's comic strip Kerry Drake, finally receiving co-credit in 1976.

He emigrated to the United States in 1955. His son and newspaper syndicate editor related Gümen's career and trials.
