= Fred McCarthy (cartoonist) =

American cartoonist and friar (1918–2009)

- Born: Frederick Francis McCarthy; September 5, 1918 Massachusetts, U.S.
- Died: October 26, 2009 (aged 91) Delray Beach, Florida, U.S.
- Areas: Cartoonist, Franciscan friar
- Notable works: Brother Juniper
- Spouse: Lilly

Frederick Francis "Fred" McCarthy, O.F.S., (5 September 1918 – 26 October 2009) was an American Franciscan cartoonist, creator of the popular Brother Juniper single-panel comic strip.

== Early years ==
McCarthy grew up in Boston, Massachusetts and drew cartoons from an early age, some of which he submitted (without success) to the New Yorker. He attended Boston College, but, feeling called to becoming a Franciscan friar, transferred to St. Bonaventure College in Olean, New York. He entered the Order and was given the religious name of Justin.

== Career ==
McCarthy began drawing a cartoon friar while a student there, at first for his own amusement, and then for posters and flyers. He named the short, freckled, and ever-cheerful (if sometimes naive) character "Brother Juniper" in 1942, after the historical Brother Juniper, a companion of St. Francis of Assisi. McCarthy later served as art director of Friar, a national Franciscan magazine, and this led to the Brother Juniper character coming to the attention of the Publishers Syndicate, a distributor of comic strips.

The Brother Juniper strip was published from 1958 until 1989. Running in over 100 American newspapers as well as overseas, Brother Juniper was the only religious-themed comic ever syndicated in daily newspapers internationally. McCarthy also created two less-successful religious-themed strips, Sister Suzie about a teaching nun, and Brother Rufus. He published these under the pen name "Fred Francis".

McCarthy, a Secular Franciscan from 1938, was ordained as a Catholic priest in 1945 but left the friars and the priesthood in the early 1960s. He remained active as a Franciscan, however, resuming his life as a Franciscan tertiary, in which he was active till the end of his life. He taught at a number of colleges and universities.

== Death ==
McCarthy died on October 26, 2009, in Delray Beach, Florida. He was survived by his wife, Lilly.

== Publications ==
- McCarthy, Fred. Brother Juniper. (1957). Garden City:Hanover House.
- McCarthy, Fred. More Brother Juniper. (1958). Garden City:Hanover House.
- McCarthy, Fred. Brother Juniper Strikes Again. (1959). Garden City:Hanover House.
- McCarthy, Fred. Brother Juniper at Work and Play. (1960). Garden City:Hanover House.
- McCarthy, Fred. Inside Brother Juniper. (1963). New York:Pocket Books.
- McCarthy, Fred. Well Done, Brother Juniper. (1963). Garden City:Doubleday.
- McCarthy, Fred. The Whimsical World of Brother Juniper. (1963). New York:Pocket Books.
- McCarthy, Fred (as "Fred Francis"). Brother Rufus. (1964). Garden City:Doubleday.
- McCarthy, Fred (as "Fred Francis"). Sister Suzie. (1964). Garden City:Doubleday.
- McCarthy, Fred. The Ecumenical Brother Juniper. (1965). Garden City:Doubleday.
- McCarthy, Fred (2012). The Definitive Brother Juniper. Empty-Grave Publishing. ISBN 978-1620890134. Includes the eight previously published Brother Juniper collections in one volume.
