= Publishers-Hall Syndicate =

- Walt Kelly's 1967 caricatures of Robert Hall and the Hall Syndicate cartoonists. To see the details in this image, go here.
- Formerly: Hall Syndicate (1944–1946); New York Post Syndicate (1946–1949); Post-Hall Syndicate, Inc. (1949–1955); Hall Syndicate (1955–1967)
- Type: Subsidiary
- Industry: Print syndication
- Founded: 1944; 82 years ago
- Founder: Robert M. Hall
- Defunct: 1975; 51 years ago
- Fate: merged into Field Newspaper Syndicate
- Headquarters: New York City, New York, U.S.
- Area served: United States
- Key people: Allen Saunders (writer, "continuity" editor); Harold Anderson
- Products: Comic strips, newspaper columns, editorial cartoons
- Owners: Robert M. Hall (1944–1967); Field Enterprises (1967–1984)

The Hall Syndicate's Pogo (May 31, 1964)

Publishers-Hall Syndicate was a newspaper syndicate founded by Robert M. Hall in 1944. Hall served as the company's president and general manager. Over the course of its operations, the company was known as, sequentially, the Hall Syndicate (1944–1946), the New York Post Syndicate (1946–1949), the Post-Hall Syndicate (1949–1955), the Hall Syndicate (1955–1967), and Publishers-Hall Syndicate (1967–1975). The syndicate was acquired by Field Enterprises in 1967, and merged into Field Newspaper Syndicate in 1975. Some of the more notable strips syndicated by the company include Pogo, Dennis the Menace, Funky Winkerbean, Mark Trail, The Strange World of Mr. Mum, and Momma, as well as the cartoons of Jules Feiffer.

== History ==
=== Background ===
Hall had worked for The Providence Journal during high school, followed by three years at Northeastern University School of Law and four years at Brown University. After attending the Columbia University Graduate School of Journalism, he was a sales manager at United Feature Syndicate, which he joined in 1935.

=== Foundation ===
During the final months of World War II, Hall began his own syndicate by distributing to newspapers several New York Post features, including Earl Wilson's "It Happened Last Night," Sylvia Porter's finance column, "Your Money's Worth" and Samuel Grafton's "I'd Rather Be Right." Soon, Hall developed his own features, including a variety of comic strips, Debbie Dean, Mark Trail and Bruce Gentry, along with Herblock's editorial cartoons. Added to the mix were serialized books and columns, including Elise Morrow's "Capital Capers," Pierre de Rohan's "Man in the Kitchen," Sterling North's book reviews, Jimmy Cannon's sports column and Major George Fielding Eliot writing on defense and tactics.

The company was incorporated as the New York Post Syndicate in August 1946. New features added in 1948–49 included Walt Kelly's Pogo, the adventure strip Tex Austin, Victor Riesel's "Inside Labor" column and a facts panel, Wizard of Odds.

On March 1, 1949, the company was renamed as the Post-Hall Syndicate, Inc., and during the 1950s, it distributed the writings of Norman Vincent Peale.

The name was shortened to the Hall Syndicate after Robert Hall bought out the Post in 1955. Jules Feiffer's strips ran for 42 years in The Village Voice, first under the title Sick Sick Sick, briefly as Feiffer's Fables and finally as simply Feiffer. Influenced by UPA and William Steig, the strip debuted October 24, 1956. Three years later, beginning April 1959, Feiffer was distributed nationally by the Hall Syndicate, initially in The Boston Globe, Minneapolis Star Tribune, Newark Star-Ledger and Long Island Press.

=== Acquisition by Field Enterprises ===
In 1967, the company was sold to Field Enterprises, who merged it with the previously acquired Publishers Syndicate to form the Publishers-Hall Syndicate, and thus taking on distribution of such popular, long-running strips as Mary Worth, Steve Roper, Penny, Kerry Drake, Rex Morgan, M.D., Judge Parker, Miss Peach, B.C., and The Wizard of Id.

In 1968, when the company began distributing John Saunders & Al McWilliams' Dateline: Danger!, it became the first nationally syndicated comic strip with an African-American lead character.

John McMeel was assistant general manager and national sales director for the syndicate when he left in 1970 to co-found what would become Andrews McMeel Universal.

In 1975, Publishers-Hall was (re)named Field Newspaper Syndicate. (Field Enterprises sold the syndicate to Rupert Murdoch's News Corporation in 1984; the operation was subsequently purchased by Hearst and is now part of King Features Syndicate.)

== Publishers-Hall strips and panels ==
Strips and panels that originated with the New York Post Syndicate, the Hall Syndicate, or the Post-Hall Syndicate:

- Andy Capp by Reg Smythe (1957–1975; continued by Field Newspaper Syndicate and then eventually by Creators Syndicate)
- Big George by Virgil Partch (1960–1975; continued by Field Newspaper Syndicate and then eventually by King Features until 1990)
- Bruce Gentry by Ray Bailey (1949–1955)
- Dateline: Danger! by John Saunders & Al McWilliams (1968–1974)
- David Crane by Win Mortimer and Creig Flessel (1956–1973)
- Debbie Dean by Bert Whitman (1942–1949)
- Dennis the Menace by Hank Ketcham (1951–1975; continued by Field Newspaper Syndicate and then eventually by King Features)
- Funky Winkerbean by Tom Batiuk (1972–1975; continued by Field Newspaper Syndicate and then eventually by King Features)
- Jules Feiffer
- Louie by Harry Hanan (1947–c. 1950; moved to Chicago Tribune New York News Syndicate, where it ran until 1976)
- Mark Trail originally by Ed Dodd (1946–1975; continued by Field Newspaper Syndicate and then eventually by King Features)
- Modesty Blaise by Peter O'Donnell & Jim Holdaway (1966–1967)
- Momma by Mell Lazarus (1970–1975; continued by Field Newspaper Syndicate and then eventually by Creators Syndicate)
- Pogo by Walt Kelly (1948–1975)
- The Ryatts (October 11, 1954–1975; continued until 1994 by Field Newspaper Syndicate and then eventually by King Features until 1994) originally by Cal Alley (1954–1964), continued by Jack Elrod (1964–1994)
- The Strange World of Mr. Mum by Irving Phillips (1958–1974)
- Tex Austin originally by Sam Robins & Tom Fanning (1949–1950)

== See also ==
- Toni Mendez
