= Rex Morgan, M.D. =

American comic strip

- Marvin Bradley and Frank Edgington's Rex Morgan, M.D. (April 19, 1953)
- Author(s): Nicholas P. Dallis (1948–1990); Woody Wilson (1990-2016); Terry Beatty (2016–present)
- Illustrator(s): Marvin Bradley (1948–1978) & John Frank Edgington (1948–1976); Frank Springer (1979–1981); Fernando Da Silva (1982); Tony DiPreta (1983–2000); Graham Nolan (2000–2013); Terry Beatty (2013–present)
- Current status/schedule: Running daily & Sunday
- Launch date: May 10, 1948; 78 years ago
- Syndicate(s): (current) King Features Syndicate (formerly) Publishers Syndicate (1948–1967); Publishers-Hall Syndicate / Field Newspaper Syndicate / News America Syndicate / North America Syndicate (1967–1988)
- Genre: Soap opera

Rex Morgan, M.D. is an American soap opera comic strip, created May 10, 1948 by psychiatrist Dr. Nicholas P. Dallis under the pseudonym Dal Curtis.

== History ==
The name for the strip was inspired by the real life Rex S. Morgan Sr., the U.S. Army's "chief mortician" and a popular Philadelphia TV personality in the 1960s. The strip's look and content was influenced by the work of Allen Saunders and Ken Ernst on Mary Worth.

Initially syndicated by Publishers Syndicate and then by Field Newspaper Syndicate, Rex Morgan, M.D. is now at King Features Syndicate. A 1952 attempt to create a TV series starring Louis Heyward was unsuccessful, with the pilot never shown.

== Story and characters ==
The story centers on Dr. Rex Morgan, who in 1948 moves to the fictional small town of Glenwood to take over a late friend's practice. Helping him grapple with a dizzying array of medical problems is his old friend's office manager and nurse, June Gale. Morgan and Gale collaborated in resolving the medical and emotional problems of patients and friends over the years. Among their patients was feisty elder Melissa Clairidge, introduced in 1951. She was not used after 2012 except for a flashback story in 2020. Rex's former classmate Keith Cavell was introduced in 1957 and starred in occasional story lines until he was killed off in 1995. Young Dr. Brice Adam sometimes had a story to himself from 1970 to 1978, for example in a situation which saw him taken hostage by two felons who had meningitis.

Rex and June married in 1995. They introduced their first child, a daughter named Sarah Ann Morgan, on February 22, 2000. Their second child, Michael Dallis Morgan, was introduced on 29 November 2015, and an adopted child, Johnny, joined the family in 2018. Rex and June now operate their own free clinic. They have two dogs.

The strip has long been praised for its blunt tackling of social issues and taboo subjects, such as drug abuse, domestic violence, HIV/AIDS, tuberculosis, diabetes, organ transplants, adoption and sexual harassment. The story's constant realism about these issues has led groups such as the Leahy Foundation to use Rex Morgan as a teaching tool. In the case of the Leahy Foundation, the strip has been used to teach their students about epilepsy at Harvard University. Some issues, particularly in the strip's early years, proved too controversial. In 1950, the Newark News refused to run one series in which a nurse tried to euthanize her sick father. The paper wrote that the sequences "dealt with an attempted mercy killing and had no place on this comic page."

Dallis claimed he created the strip to inform the general public about medical issues in an entertaining manner. For instance, a continuity from 1970 depicted the plight of an attractive young woman who frequently experienced gaps of "missing time": Morgan diagnosed her as suffering from petit mal. In later years, the story plots moved away from medical themes as Rex and June alternated in stories, confronting threats and danger from a variety of malfeasants. A popular story took place in 2006, in which longtime character Dr. Troy Gainer was revealed to be a fraud. Beginning in 2016, artist-writer Terry Beatty often put Rex back in medical settings, either at his clinic or in the hospital. Beatty also had Morgan tackle pseudoscience in the form of a scam perpetrated by recurring con artist René Belluso, as discussed in a 2019 interview in Skeptical Inquirer.

In 2019, the strip introduced Marti, a friend of Sarah's with Down syndrome.

In January 2022 Belluso returned, threatening a multi-million dollar lawsuit against Sarah (who allegedly committed intellectual theft involving characters Belluso said he created) in a bid to get revenge against Rex for his part in ending Belluso's pseudoscience scam. On the 30th, attorney Barry Stuhr was introduced.

== Artists and writers ==
Dallis died in July 1991. Woody Wilson became the writer. His name appeared in September 1991. From 1948 to 1978, the strip was drawn by Marvin Bradley, with backgrounds by John Frank Edgington. Edgington retired in 1976. Their team was succeeded from 1979 to 1981 by former Terry and the Pirates assistant Frank Springer. Fernando Da Silva briefly took over the strip in 1982, then in 1983 Tony DiPreta became the main artist. On 19 June 2000, long-time DC Comics artist Graham Nolan began a 13-year stint. On 30 December 2013, Terry Beatty made his debut as the strip's artist. In spring 2016 Wilson left and Beatty became the writer.

Uncredited assistants during the 1970s included Fran Matera, Alex Kotzky and André LeBlanc. With the changes in artists, the character have been known to change appearance. With Nolan's art first appearing in 2000, a complete overhaul of the characters' physical appearances was seen. When Beatty became artist at the end of 2013, he redesigned the characters in his own way.

== In popular culture ==
In The Simpsons episode "Krusty Gets Kancelled", Homer Simpson is reading the funny pages and comments, "Ah, Rex Morgan, M.D., you have the prescription for the daily blues."

Cartoonist Bill Watterson occasionally drew his syndicated newspaper comic strip Calvin and Hobbes in the realistic style of Rex Morgan, M.D., when depicting six-year-olds Calvin and Susie playing "house."

== See also ==
- EC Comics' M.D.
- Medic
