= Mary Worth =

American comic strip

- Argo Publication' Mary Worth #1 (March 1956), reprinting strips by writer Allen Saunders and artist Ken Ernst
- Author: Allen Saunders (1938–1979); John Saunders (1974–2004--final months published posthumously); Karen Moy (May 17, 2004 dailies, June 6, 2004 Sundays–present)
- Illustrator(s): Dale Connor (1938–1942); Ken Ernst (1942–1985); Bill Ziegler (1986–1990); Jim Armstrong (1991); Joe Giella (1991–2016); June Brigman & Roy Richardson (2016–present)
- Current status/schedule: Daily & Sunday
- Launch date: 1938
- Alternate name: Mary Worth's Family (1938–1942)
- Syndicate(s): (current) King Features Syndicate (formerly) Publishers Syndicate (1938–1967); Publishers-Hall Syndicate / Field Newspaper Syndicate / News America Syndicate / North America Syndicate (1967–1988)
- Genre: soap opera

Mary Worth is an American newspaper comic strip that has had an eight-decade run from 1938. Distributed by King Features Syndicate, this soap opera-style strip influenced several that followed. It was created by writer Allen Saunders and artist Dale Connor, and initially appeared under the pseudonym "Dale Allen". Ken Ernst succeeded Connor as artist in 1942.

Mary Worth is associated with an older comic strip, Apple Mary, sometimes subtitled Mary Worth's Family, which dates from 1934 and features the character "Apple Mary" Worth, as well as several supporting characters who would continue into the new strip.

== Publication history ==
=== Origins ===
Many reference sources state that Mary Worth was a continuation of Publishers Syndicate's Depression-era strip Apple Mary, created by Martha Orr in 1934, centering on an old woman who sold apples on the street and offered humble common sense. Though usually called "Apple Mary", the character's full name is given as Mary Worth in at least one 1935 strip. Apple Mary ran through 1938, at which point, writes comics historian Don Markstein, "It's generally thought that under a new writer (Allen Saunders, whose credits include Kerry Drake and Steve Roper) and artist (Dale Connor, formerly Orr's assistant), it gradually metamorphosed into Mary Worth." As late as February 1940, the strip appeared as Apple Mary, subtitled Mary Worth's Family. (See example below.)

King Features, which began syndicating Mary Worth in 1987, gives the debut year of Mary Worth as 1938, and denies any connection between the strips, saying, "Contrary to popular belief, Mary Worth is not a continuation of the Depression-era favorite Apple Mary. The strip was created as a replacement feature offered to newspapers when Martha Orr, who created the dowdy apple peddler, retired. The only thing the new title character had in common with her predecessor was a first name."

There is, however, significant evidence that the two comic strips share an unbroken narrative featuring identical characters. Besides the character of Mary Worth herself, Mary's grandson Dennie is featured in both comic strips, regularly appearing from 1934 to 1944, and reappearing as an adult in stories published from 1955-1957, 1959, 1961, and 1963. Mary's son, "Slim" Worth, is featured in stories appearing in 1936–37, 1940–41, 1961–62, and 1963. Mary's friend, Bill Biff, is featured in stories appearing between 1935 and 1944.

Saunders himself recalled that Apple Mary became Mary Worth:

Soon after our team took over, we changed the name of the strip to Mary Worth's Family. Later, it took on its present title, Mary Worth. In her new role, the old street merchant obviously was not usable. So Ken Ernst gave her a beauty treatment, some weight loss and a more appropriate wardrobe. ... We put her applecart in storage, where it will remain, even in the event of another economic slump.

By 1976, Mary Worth was being distributed by the Field Newspaper Syndicate to more than 300 newspapers worldwide.

=== Later history ===
Saunders retired in 1979 (and died in 1986), and Ernst died in 1985. Bill Ziegler, who did backgrounds on the strip for many years, took over the strip after Ernst's death, continuing from 1986 to 1990. In 1987, King Features Syndicate began syndicating Mary Worth.

Other artists and writers who worked on the strip include Saunders' son, John Saunders (1974–2003), and Ernst's son-in-law, Jim Armstrong (1991). Former DC Comics artist Joe Giella took over the art in 1991 with Karen Moy writing the strip as of the death of John Saunders in 2003.

Giella said in 2010:

When I first took over, the editor asked if I could take a few wrinkles off her face because the previous artist was making her look a little too old. So take a line off here, a line there, you're knocking off about 15, 20 years. She doesn't have the bun, she has a love life, she's going out with a doctor, so I had to streamline her and take a little weight off. The L.A. Times ran a story with the headline [asking if Mary Worth had had a facelift]."

Giella retired from drawing the strip in 2016, with his last strip appearing July 23. June Brigman and Roy Richardson, who had begun drawing the Sunday strips in May 2016, took over full-time artistic duties upon Giella's retirement.

Under Allen Saunders, the daily strips usually had four panels with multiple exchanges among the characters and several stories per year. Under his son, the norm became two panels, with less dialog and stories stretching as long as 18 months. Moy has sought to reverse that "glacial" pace and to show Worth as not only a "figure of common sense and compassion" but also as "human" in her own flaws and experiencing "jealousy, self-doubt, fear, and anger".

== Characters and story ==
Apple Mary strip of February 14, 1935, identifying the title character as Mary Worth in panels three and four

Allen Saunders' and Dale Conner's Apple Mary, subtitled, Mary Worth's Family in blue panel at top left (February 4, 1940)

As scripted by Saunders, each story (and its cast) was largely independent, though some popular characters would reappear. Mary Worth herself, though always a presence in each story, was almost never the central character.

Typically, a story would revolve around the troubles of someone who was somehow in Mary's orbit. Mary herself might not appear in the strip for weeks at a time, although she would eventually be around to give timely advice and support (or occasionally, a stern talking-to, if appropriate) to a character at a crucial point. The most popular early reoccurring characters were former showgirl Leona Stockpool (1939, 1942, 1948), spoiled actress Angel Varden (1941, 1942, 1949, 1969), and tough-talking show business writer, "Brick" Bricker (multiple stories between 1946 and 1953). Mary's cousins, Hildy Worth Brant (multiple stories between 1955 and 1964) and Constance Moneta Hansen (multiple stories between 1958 and 1970), were also featured. Mary would visit her friends, Frank and Anne Crawford in Jennings, Ohio, roughly once a year between 1965 and 1979. While Mary generally made only brief appearances to react and give her matronly advice, she had occasional longer appearances that chronicled her unsuccessful romances: Colonel Everett Canfield (1942), "Drum" Greenwood (1949, 1950), and Admiral "Reef" Hansen (1959).

When Saunders' son John fully took over the narrative, he had his largely nomadic heroine put down roots, becoming the in-house manager of the Charterstone Condominium Complex in 1979 in fictional Santa Royale, California. There, Mary serves as an observer of and adviser to her fellow residents, tackling issues such as drug and alcohol abuse, infidelity and teen pregnancy. Around the same time, the previous recurring characters were quietly dropped, including Mary's son and grandson, who were essentially retconned out of existence. (They had been slowly fading from prominence already, as they were extremely infrequently seen or referenced from about 1964 on. However, as of the move to Charterstone, Mary was childless.)

From 1979, the strip centered somewhat more on the title character than in previous years, along with a regular cast of her closest friends, most of whom were introduced to the strip after 1980: the genial but somewhat pompous Professor Ian Cameron and his insecure younger wife Toby (1980); buffoonish, romantically inept advice columnist Wilbur Weston and his college-student daughter Dawn (1993); and Dr. Jeff Cory, Mary's perennial beau, and his two physician adult children, Drew and Adrian Cory (1996). All these characters would have featured storylines—Mary herself could still be absent from the strip for weeks at a time—as the strip developed into a soap opera-ish saga of the lives and loves of Mary's long-term friends and the various Charterstone tenants.

When Karen Moy took over the strip in 2003, she provided an updated background for Mary, establishing that the character is a former teacher, used to live in New York, and is the widow of Wall Street tycoon Jack Worth.

Moy's handling of the strip during a 2006 plot line in which Mary was stalked by Aldo Kelrast ("Kelrast" being an anagram of "stalker"), a man rumored to have killed his late wife, drew media attention partly because of perceived unintentional humor due to the character's resemblance to Captain Kangaroo. An intervention staged by Mary and her friends drove Aldo to returning to finding comfort in alcohol, which led to his death in a drunk driving incident, in which he drove off a cliff. A subsequent plot development was the arrival of Ella Byrd, another elderly dispenser of advice, who not only aroused feelings of jealousy and inadequacy in Mary, but also, as a psychic, alerted her to Dr. Jeff being in danger.

Later story lines introduced an additional foil, the alcoholic hospital administrator Jill whose anti-marriage diatribes (caused by her being jilted at the altar by her fiancé) put her into Mary's orbit when she offers to help Jeff's daughter plan her wedding. Others include plot lines regarding Internet addiction and Mary's refusal to trade in her beloved PC for an iPad.

== Comic books ==
The Apple Mary comic strip was among those reprinted in some of the earliest American comic books, Eastern Color Printing's Famous Funnies, in 1936, and continuing in Dell Comics' Popular Comics and Western's Mammoth Comics at least sporadically through 1938. Mary Worth would in turn be reprinted in comic books by Pines Publications, Magazine Enterprises, and Harvey Comics—initially as a backup feature in issues Green Hornet Comics and Black Cat, and later in Love Stories of Mary Worth #1-5 (Sept. 1949 - May 1950). More reprints followed in Argo Publications' single-issue Mary Worth (March 1956), and in the late 1990s in American Publishing's Storyline Strips.

== Parodies ==
In a run of Li'l Abner Sunday strips in 1957, Al Capp lampooned Mary Worth as "Mary Wart". The title character was depicted as a nosy, interfering busybody, with a caricature of Allen Saunders portraying her put-upon, long-suffering son-in-law. Saunders returned Capp's fire with the introduction of the character "Hal Rapp," a foul-tempered, ill-mannered, and (ironically) inebriated cartoonist (Capp was a teetotaler). Later, the feud was revealed to be a collaborative hoax that Capp and his longtime pal Saunders had cooked up together. The Capp-Saunders "feud" fooled both editors and readers, generating plenty of free publicity for both strips—and Capp and Saunders had a good laugh when all was revealed.

A 1988 storyline of The Amazing Spider-Man comic strip had a boy character trying to sell comic strips to J. Jonah Jameson; one strip was called Mary Worse.

In season two, episode six of the television series "Taxi", Louie accuses Alex of being "Mary Worth" when he becomes a referee to Tony and Bobby's love triangle.

An episode of The Simpsons, "Bart Sells His Soul", features Comic Book Guy displaying "a very rare Mary Worth in which she has advised a friend to commit suicide". In another episode, "Lady Bouvier's Lover", he trades a Mary Worth telephone to Bart Simpson for an Itchy and Scratchy animation cel. In the episode "Guess Who's Coming to Criticize Dinner?", the tour of the Springfield Shopper leads them to the comic department which is headed by the author of Mary Worth. The guide asks: "Who reads Mary Worth?", to which the group remains silent, and the guide says: "Let's move on."

In the Futurama episode "The Why of Fry", Fry remarks: "There are guys in the background of Mary Worth comics that are more important than me," upon finding out that Leela, his love interest, is about to go on a date with an important mayor's aide.

In a FoxTrot strip, the characters are discussing how many comic strips that day have jokes based on golf. Jason comments: "I loved Mary Worth's line about sand traps." In another FoxTrot strip, after being bombarded by Jason's suggestions, the newspapers give Mary Worth vampire fangs. In a Pearls Before Swine strip, Rat, on steroids, decides he "will kick Mary Worth's &#$*%!"

In a Far Side strip, two characters, both of whom are styled after Mary Worth characters, are seen at the door of a typical Far Side character (with a pet cow and snake), who tells them "You must be looking for "Apartment 3-G or Mary Worth or one of those other serious cartoons". In an Over the Hedge Sunday strip, Verne ends with "Maybe Mary Worth needs a pet turtle" (signifying his frustration with his co-characters' disconnection from reality) after RJ and Hammy discusses rather surrealistically around the life of missing socks, as if the socks were individual life forms on their own.

An issue of The Fabulous Furry Freak Brothers features a Mary Worth strip with a comatose Mary. Fat Freddy's Cat comments that she hasn't been the same since her stroke.

In response to readers of The Times newspaper in Shreveport, Louisiana, voting to drop Mary Worth, the comic strip The New Adventures of Queen Victoria devoted its September 25–29, 2007 strips to Victoria planning Mary's funeral.

The strip was spoofed as "Mary Worthless" on a 1975 episode of The Carol Burnett Show.

A parody of the Defenders of the Earth cartoon, called Protectors of the Earth, is made up of comic strip characters Dr. Rex Morgan, Mary Worth, Garfield and Mark Trail.

The Wikipedia page of Mary Worth is the prime subject of the opening host segment of the third episode of Mystery Science Theater 3000: The Rifftrax Experiments in which characters Crow T. Robot and Professor Bobo are in a "vicious Wikipedia editing war" with each other over its accuracy.

== See also ==
- Dick Tracy
