= Fran Matera =

American cartoonist

Francis A. Matera
- Fran Matera
- Born: December 9, 1924 Francis A. Matera
- Died: March 15, 2012 (aged 87)
- Areas: Cartoonist, Artist, Inker
- Notable works: Steve Roper and Mike Nomad

Francis A. "Fran" Matera (December 9, 1924 – March 15, 2012) was an American comic strip artist best known for his King Features Syndicate adventure strip Steve Roper and Mike Nomad from 1984 to 2004. In addition to his extensive experience in newspaper strips, Matera also spent many years in the comic book industry, particularly for Charlton Comics. His influences include Hal Foster, Alex Raymond, Milton Caniff, Al Capp, and Bud Fisher.

== Biography ==
=== Early life and career ===
While in high school in Connecticut, Fran Matera visited New York City at the recommendation of comic-strip artist Alfred Andriola, to whom the fledgeling Matera had previously sent a fan letter and art samples. Through a meeting that Andriola arranged with editors at Quality Comics, Matera was promised a staff position starting after graduation. (During this period, Matera also studied with the Correspondence Art Institute.) Following his graduation in 1942, Matera returned to spend eight months with Quality, though his credits for that time are spotty due to the industry's then-prevalent practice of rarely crediting comic-book creators.

=== World War II ===
Matera left to study at the Art Institute of Chicago, quitting after a year to enlist in the U.S. Marine Corps during World War II. During basic training, he was assigned to the Parris Island base's public relations department to help create a camp newspaper, the Parris Island Boot, and he drew the Marine Corps' comic strip Ship to Shore. Requesting combat service, Matera was sent to for additional training in Virginia and eventually shipped out on the USS Augusta, where he drew a portrait of the visiting President Harry Truman.

=== Comic strips ===
Upon his military discharge in 1947, Matera found work assisting Andriola on the dramatic strip Kerry Drake (1943–83). Matera went on to draw the strip Dickie Dare (1932–57) from 1947 to 1949, succeeding strip creator Milton Caniff and consecutive artists Coulton Waugh and Odin Burvick.

In 1950, Matera and comic book writer Chad Kelly teamed to do the short-lived Mr. Holiday (1950–51), about do-gooder Mr. Holiday and his young assistant Rod O'Keef, who is concerned about the state of holidays: "Last New Year's showed a steep increase in hangovers... Lovers' quarrels on Valentine's Day... Tree chopping on Arbor Day... Hunger at Thanksgiving... Even the ground hog refused to live up to his tradition." The strip was "not successfully distributed" by the syndicate, the George Matthew Adams Service, according to Matera's website.

Matera ghosted for credited artist Darrell McClure on Little Annie Rooney (1927–66) in 1951; drew the portly private detective series Nero Wolfe (1956–65) in 1957, between artists Mike Roy and Jim Christiansen; ghosted for credited artist Marvin Bradley on Rex Morgan, M.D. (1948- ) from 1976 to 1978; drew the movie tie-in Indiana Jones (1981), and, assisted by Dick Kulpa, the martial-arts strip The Legend of Bruce Lee (1982), written by Sharman DiVono. He additionally had brief stints ghosting Judge Parker and Apartment 3-G. From 1974 to 1975, he worked on the strip Galexo for the international market.

Beginning with the strip for April 8, 1985, Matera began his two-decade run drawing Steve Roper and Mike Nomad, which had been titled simply Steve Roper from 1947 to 1969. The series originated as the comedy strip Big Chief Wahoo in 1936, but supporting character Steve Roper edged into the title in 1944, with the dramatic adventure renamed Chief Wahoo and Steve Roper. Wahoo was written out in 1947, and Nomad was added in 1956. Matera additionally wrote the final year of Steve Roper and Mike Nomad, following writer John Saunders' death in November 2003. The final strip ran December 26, 2004.

=== Comic books ===
Between 1950 and 1976, Matera drew hundreds of comic book stories and covers. In the 1950s, he contributed to St. John Publications' Fightin' Marines and Charlton Comics' Gabby Hayes and Speed Demons. In 1959, he helped initiate the Catholic school comic book Treasure Chest, drawing all the editorial content in the Treasure Chest Advance Edition comic given to teachers and school administrators in introduce the concept. He was the initial artist on writer-creator Max Pine's long-running feature "Chuck White" (later "Chuck White and His Friends"), contributing to that schoolboy's naturalistic family drama through 1971.

For Marvel Comics, he inked penciler Ron Wilson's 46-page story "The Boy Who Cried Hulk!" in the black-and-white comics magazine The Hulk #11 (Oct. 1978), and inked Sal Buscema's 33-page story in Tarzan Annual #2 (Nov. 1978).

A Florida resident in his later years, Matera was a guest at that state's Tampa Comic Book & Toy Convention on November 11, 2007.

== Personal life ==
After marrying his wife Patricia, Matera moved with her to Delray Beach, Florida, where they lived in a two-story house nicknamed White Haven. The couple had three children, sons Fran Jr., Chris and Guy. The family later moved to Safety Harbor, Florida. There Patricia died in 2004.

Matera died from prostate cancer on March 15, 2012.
