= Nicholas P. Dallis =

American comics writer (1911–1991)

Nicholas P. Dallis' Rex Morgan, M.D. (April 19, 1953) with art by Marvin Bradley and Frank Edgington.

Nicholas Peter Dallis (December 15, 1911 – July 6, 1991), known as Nicholas P. Dallis, was an American psychiatrist turned comic strip writer, creator of the soap opera-style strips Rex Morgan, M.D., Judge Parker and Apartment 3-G. Separating his comics career from his medical practice, he wrote under pseudonyms, Dal Curtis for Rex Morgan, M.D. and Paul Nichols for Judge Parker.

== Biography ==
Born in New York City, Nick Dallis grew up on Long Island. He graduated from Washington & Jefferson College in 1933 and from Temple University's medical school in 1938 and married a nurse, Sarah Luddy. He decided to specialize in psychiatry, and after World War II, started a practice in Toledo, Ohio. Allen Saunders was chair at the time of the local mental hygiene center that invited him there, and in his autobiography, he recalled that Dallis approached him, as a well-known comics writer (Steve Roper and Mike Nomad, Mary Worth), about "his desire to write a comic strip, one tracing the history of medicine. I told him that, commendable as his idea was, such a feature would not succeed. Readers want entertainment, not enlightenment. But a story about a handsome young doctor's involvement with his patients might be a winner."

== Comic strips ==
After further conversations with Saunders on strip writing, Dallis successfully launched his Rex Morgan, M.D in 1948. Later, he found himself working more with troubled youth in juvenile court, and from his experiences there, he conceived a second strip focused on the legal world, Judge Parker, which took off in 1952 and also became successful. Both strips were in the soap opera tradition pioneered by Saunders, as continuities in which each story was basically distinct. And yet they differed from Mary Worth in centering on male protagonists who counseled their clients with professional advice as well as intervening to help them with personal problems. In addition, Dallis did manage to work in education and enlightenment for his readers, as well as entertainment. In 1958, he retired from medicine and moved to Arizona, where he continued to author his comics. In 1961, he launched his third strip, Apartment 3-G, about three young women sharing a Manhattan apartment.

Dallis died in 1991, but all three of his strips survived over the years (with Apartment 3-G ending in 2015), and as of 2023 Judge Parker and Rex Morgan, M.D. continue in syndication. He was later remembered by his successor on two of his strips, Woody Wilson, as "a prince among men... educated, kindly, compassionate, talented and generous." Wilson honored Dallis in a striking manner in the episodes of November 30 and December 1, 2015, by giving Rex and June's baby boy the second name "Dallis"; when asked by his daughter why he and June had chosen this name, Rex replied, "Nick Dallis was a very good friend of ours, Princess. We wanted to honor him!" Judge Parker and Rex Morgan, M.D. continue to honor Nick Dallis by sometimes letting their characters eat at a "Nick's Diner."
