= Little Annie Rooney =

Popular comic strip

- Nicholas Afonsky's Little Annie Rooney with script by Brandon Walsh (September 27, 1936).
- Author(s): Ed Verdier (1927–1929); Ben Batsford (1929-1930); Brandon Walsh (1930–1954); Darrell McClure (1954-1966)
- Illustrator(s): Ed Verdier (1927–1929) (dailies) Darrell McClure (1930–1966) (Sunday strips) Nicholas Afonsky (1934–1943)
- Launch date: January 10, 1927
- End date: April 16, 1966
- Syndicate(s): King Features Syndicate
- Publisher(s): Big Little Books; David McKay Publications; St. John Publications
- Genre(s): Humor, Action, Adventure

Little Annie Rooney is a comic strip about a young orphaned girl who traveled about with her dog, Zero.

King Features Syndicate launched the strip on January 10, 1927, not long after it was apparent that the Chicago Tribune Syndicate had scored a huge hit with Little Orphan Annie. The name comes from the 1889 popular song of the same name, still familiar to many at the time. Although the King Features strip was an obvious knock-off with several similar parallels, the approach was quite different, and Little Annie Rooney had a successful run from January 10, 1927, to April 16, 1966.

== Publication history ==
The strip's creators over the years included Ed Verdier (1927–29), Ben Batsford (1929-30), Sunday strips by Nicholas Afonsky (1934–43), writer Brandon Walsh (1930–54) and Darrell McClure (1930–66). McClure's assistants were Bob Dunn and Fran Matera.

Daily

- Ed Verdier (story and art): Jan 10, 1927 - July 20, 1929
- Ben Batsford (story and art): July 22, 1929 - Oct 4, 1930
- Brandon Walsh (story) & Darrell McClure (art): Oct 6, 1930 - 1954
- Darrell McClure (story and art): 1954 - April 16, 1966

Sunday

- Brandon Walsh (story) & Darrell McClure (art): Nov 30, 1930 - Feb 4, 1934
- Brandon Walsh (story) & Nicholas Afonsky (art): Feb 11, 1934 - Aug 8, 1943
- Brandon Walsh (story) & Darrell McClure (art): Aug 15, 1943 - April 4, 1954
- Darrell McClure (story and art): April 11, 1954 - May 30, 1965

The Sunday page had a topper in the 1930s and early 40s. The first one, Fablettes, began in the early 1930s and ended on March 10, 1935. This was replaced by Ming Foo, which ran from March 17, 1935 to March 28, 1943.

== Origins ==
Little Annie Rooney became popular in a 19th-century song by Michael Nolan. After Nolan sang "Little Annie Rooney" in English music halls in 1890, Annie Hart (also known as "The Bowery Girl") brought it to the United States. When she performed at New York's London Theatre, the song became a hit, but the absence of any international copyright laws kept Nolan from collecting royalties.

A bitter Nolan retired from composing, and his song later became a favorite piano roll and calliope tune, heard at circuses and carousels. The lyrics make it clear that the Annie of the song and the Annie of the strip are two different characters:

A winning way, a pleasant smile,
Dress'd so neat but quite in style,
Merry chaff your time to wile,
Has little Annie Rooney.
Ev'ry evening, rain or shine,
I make a call twixt eight and nine,
On her who shortly will be mine,
Little Annie Rooney.
She's my sweetheart, I'm her beau;
She's my Annie, I'm her Joe,
Soon we'll marry, never to part,
Little Annie Rooney is my sweetheart!

The parlor's small, but neat and clean,
And set with taste so seldom seen,
And you can bet, the household queen,
Is little Annie Rooney.
The fire burns cheerfully and bright,
As a family circle round each night,
We form, and ev'ry one's delight
Is little Annie Rooney.

We've been engaged close on a year,
The happy time is drawing near,
I'll wed the one I love so dear,
Little Annie Rooney.
My friends declare I'm in a jest,
Until the time comes will not rest,
But one who knows its value best,
Is little Annie Rooney.

There is also a Scottish saying: "She is having an Annie Rooney", which means that someone is displaying rage and anger. Annie Rooney's pet expression was "Gloriosky!" That unique G-rated expletive and Little Orphan Annie's "Leapin' lizards!" both found their way into the Leonard Bernstein and Stephen Sondheim song "Gee, Officer Krupke!" in the musical West Side Story.

Harvey Kurtzman had both Annies in mind when he created his satirical Little Annie Fanny for Playboy, though the ribald parody owed far more to the original Harold Gray strip.

James Joyce referred to Little Annie Rooney early in the first chapter of Finnegans Wake: "Arrah, sure, we all love little Anny Ruiny, or, we mean to say, lovelittle Anna Rayiny, when unda her brella, mid piddle med puddle, she ninnygoes nannygoes nancing by."

== Films ==
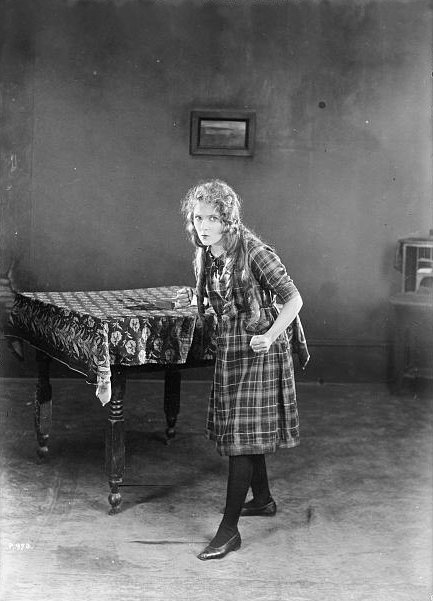
Mary Pickford in the 1925 film Little Annie Rooney

Prior to the creation of the identically titled comic strip, Mary Pickford starred as a girl of the slums in William Beaudine's 1925 silent comedy-drama Little Annie Rooney (United Artists), set in New York's Lower East Side. Audiences found nothing unusual about 32-year-old Mary Pickford portraying a 12-year-old, and this became one of her most successful films. Turner Classic Movies has aired a restored version, produced by the Mary Pickford Foundation. The Fleischer Studios did a Little Annie Rooney animated Screen Song in 1931.

Fox Film Corporation purchased the rights to the comic strip and planned to turn it into a film starring child actress Jane Withers. This project became the 1935 film Ginger, Withers' first starring role.

Shirley Temple did her first teenage role (receiving her second screen kiss) in Miss Annie Rooney (1942); the George Bruce screenplay is not an adaptation of the comic strip but instead dramatizes the situation of a poor girl with a wealthy boyfriend. In Gavin Lambert's 1963 novel Inside Daisy Clover, which is set in the 1950s, Daisy becomes a star after appearing in her first movie, a musical remake of Mary Pickford's "Little Annie Rooney".

== Reprints ==
Little Annie Rooney on the Highway to Adventure was one of several Big Little Books. After a 1935 book of reprints, Little Annie Rooney was seen in comic book reprints — David McKay Publications's Feature Book #11 (1938), King Comics, a 1948 three-issue series published by St. John Publications and the Treasury of Comics annuals (1948–1950), also from St. John.
