= Allen Saunders =

American cartoonist (1899–1986)

- Allen Saunders on Password (May 20, 1965).
- Born: John Allen Saunders; April 24, 1899 Lebanon, Indiana, U.S.
- Died: January 28, 1986 (aged 86) Maumee, Ohio, U.S.
- Areas: Writer, Editor
- Notable works: Big Chief Wahoo / Steve Roper and Mike Nomad; Mary Worth; Kerry Drake
- Awards: Inkpot Award (1981)
- Spouse: Lois
- Children: 4

Allen Saunders (April 24, 1899 – January 28, 1986) was an American writer, journalist and cartoonist who wrote the comic strips Steve Roper and Mike Nomad, Mary Worth and Kerry Drake.

He is credited with being the originator of the saying, "Life is what happens to us while we are making other plans" in 1957. The saying was later slightly modified and popularised by John Lennon in the song "Beautiful Boy (Darling Boy)".

His full name, John Allen Saunders, sometimes led to confusion with his son John (John Phillip Saunders, 1924–2003), who later continued two of his father's strips.

== Career overview ==
Allen Saunders covered the gamut of comics genres: editorial, commercial, gag, adventure, and melodrama. Big Chief Wahoo (later renamed Steve Roper and Mike Nomad) was popular in its day, a witty romp with puns, slapstick and satire. But although it defended Native Americans and joked at "palefaces," it relied on exaggerated stereotypes for humor. Saunders admitted that "if we were doing Chief Wahoo today, we'd have problems." It was his serious dramas or "open-ended novels" Steve Roper, Mary Worth, and Kerry Drake that showed his mature talents and reflected himself and his views on the human condition.

Roper, like Saunders, was a journalist who was decent, knew French, smoked a pipe, had run his college newspaper (and almost flunked physics) and faced tough challenges. Through him, Saunders defended journalism while also enjoying the action sequences he wrote for him and Nomad. He was especially fond of the "indigenous gimmick" technique, solving a problem by using something that is ordinarily ignored in the setting. But he identified more with Mary Worth: "Mary and I have come, over the years, to think pretty much alike" (1971 interview). As opposed to the existing action/adventure genre popular with male readers, his Mary Worth established the soap strip with its appeal primarily to women. (In his 1971 interview, he said that 90% of his fan letters for Worth came from females, and 90% of those for Roper and Nomad were from males.) It in fact was singled out for praise by Eleanor Roosevelt. He inspired later soap strip writers such as Nick Dallis, who started Rex Morgan, M.D., Judge Parker, and Apartment 3-G. But he himself disliked the term "soap" because he saw an underlying unity in his own strips as "adventure strips" based on conflict—emotional conflict in Mary Worth, physical conflict in Steve Roper. One of his major contributions was to merge the two as Roper, Nomad, and Drake increasingly dealt with emotional conflicts in their personal lives and faced hard moral dilemmas.

Narrating conflicts in a range of social issues (drugs, the sexes, divorce, job loss, the youth scene and counterculture, prejudice, and of course crime, to name just a few), Saunders wrote tight, fast-moving stories with plot twists and dramatic tension lightened by droll predicaments. He was known for "sophisticated scripts with literate dialogue", with almost twice as much said (and happening) per daily strip as in the post-1979 versions, and under him, even Nomad (later treated as slow-witted and speaking in grawlixes) was a sharp, shrewd character who was articulate in three languages. Saunders explored personality and motivation in the long series of people passing through his strips, and they got to be "awfully real" to him. His scripts were interpreted and fleshed out by talented realist artists (Ernst in Mary Worth, Pete Hoffman and then William Overgard in Steve Roper, Alfred Andriola and his ghosts in Kerry Drake) who made the characters and settings both attractive and believable.

At the end of Saunders' autobiography (published in Nemo shortly after his death), Nemo editor Rick Marschall called him a "dedicated craftsman and a flinty, memorable personality." That showed through clearly in his 42-year output of popular dramas for his "paper actors."

== Biography ==
=== Early life and career ===
Born in Lebanon, Indiana, Saunders enjoyed newspaper comics as a youth, and he practiced drawing them. After graduating from Wabash College in 1920, he taught French there for seven years while working in the summers on his M.A. at the University of Chicago and taking night classes at the Chicago Academy of Fine Arts. He drew editorial cartoons and the single-panel Miserable Moments, wrote detective fiction for magazines, worked in Chautauqua theater and wrote plays. These experiences converged in his later comics career.

In 1927, while on sabbatical from Wabash, he moved to Toledo, Ohio as a reporter and drama critic for the News-Bee, and he stayed on with that newspaper. Eight years later, Elmer Woggon (a friend at the rival Toledo Blade) proposed a comic strip for Publishers Syndicate, The Great Gusto, which he would draw if Saunders did the writing. They shook on it, but it wasn't accepted until they refocused on its Indian character. On November 23, 1936, it finally appeared in the newspapers as Big Chief Wahoo and scored a success—fortunately, as Saunders' regular job ended when the News-Bee folded in 1938. Gags gave way to adventure strips, so in 1940, he began to reshape the narrative into Steve Roper, centered on the escapades of a racket-busting photojournalist.

=== Mary Worth ===
Allen Saunders' and Dale Conner's Apple Mary, subtitled, Mary Worth's Family (February 4, 1940)

In 1939, he was asked to write Apple Mary when its creator (since 1932) Martha Orr left, and he developed it into Mary Worth's Family. While the King Features Syndicate website insists that these two Marys are unrelated, Saunders' autobiography and interviews explicitly document the transition. The Depression-era apple vendor's full name was Mary Worth, and Saunders explained his makeover of the character and how her deceased husband's stocks regained their value. The result was a new kind of continuity strip patterned on women's magazine stories of the time, as Mary met people with interesting lives and dispensed her advice when their problems reached a critical point. When his artist Dale Conner quit to do a strip of her own, Saunders persuaded Ken Ernst to take over the artwork in 1942, and the strip became simply Mary Worth.

Allen Saunders and Alfred Andriola's Kerry Drake (July 25, 1968). To see this image at a higher resolution go to Art 4 Comics.

In addition to these two strips, as comics editor for Publishers Syndicate, he finished up the police strip Dan Dunn in 1942–43 and agreed to write the syndicate's proposed replacement, Kerry Drake. But the artist, Alfred Andriola, stipulated receiving sole credit for it. So for three decades, Saunders intrigued newspaper and comic book readers with his well-written and researched Kerry Drake detective stories, but he was not credited, even when Andriola accepted the 1970 Reuben Award for "Kerry Drake by Alfred Andriola." Saunders quit the strip soon after that and was "not sorry". It was only after Andriola's death in 1983 that the real author was revealed.

Even with the occasional assistance of his son John, a Toledo broadcaster, it was a challenge to keep three story strips going (as well as writing a 1950s advertising comic Duke Handy and consulting on John's strip Dateline: Danger! (1968–74) But as he noted in his autobiography, "as long as there are people, there are plots." He approached his work as a "craft."

After getting feedback for a story idea from his artists, he isolated himself to map it out over 13 weeks of dailies and Sundays (1953 article), with the playwriting formula "First act, get your leading character up a tree; second act, throw rocks at him; third act, get him down". Then, in his work week, he allocated two days to each of the three strips to create a week's worth, using his own cartooning skills to sketch roughs of the characters and dialog in each panel for his artists and letterers to follow. Saunders also served as chair of the Newspaper Comics Council, was a longtime member of the National Cartoonists Society who helped younger cartoonists get started (e.g., Fran Matera, Pete Hoffman, Nicholas P. Dallis, Alex Kotzky), and was a civic-minded leader in Toledo community affairs.

In 1957, Saunders wrote the line, "Life is what happens to us while we are making other plans," usually attributed to John Lennon. It appeared in a 1957 issue of the Reader's Digest.

=== Later life and death ===
In 1979, Saunders retired and turned over the writing of Steve Roper and Mary Worth to son John. He remained professionally active as "Dean of American Continuity Strips" (a reputation that amused him), received an Inkpot Award in 1981, and wrote his Nemo autobiography, a rich resource on the history of American comic strip writing. He died on January 28, 1986, survived by his wife of 63 years, Lois, and their four children (John, David, Penny, Lois Ann), and donating an archive of material to the Browne Library for Popular Culture Studies at Bowling Green State University. Steve Roper and Mike Nomad, the enduring continuation of his first strip, finally came to an end on December 26, 2004, while Mary Worth still appears under Karen Moy and Joe Giella. Kerry Drake ended with Andriola.
