= General Features =

General Features Corporation
- Industry: Print syndication
- Founded: 1937; 89 years ago
- Founder: S. George Little
- Defunct: 1974; 52 years ago
- Headquarters: 250 Park Avenue, New York, NY, U.S.
- Key people: Louis Martin, VP & editor Rex Barley
- Products: Columns, Comic strips, Gag panels
- Owner: S. George Little (1939–1967); Times Mirror Company (1967–1974)
- Parent: Los Angeles Times Syndicate (1967–1974)

General Features Corporation was a syndication service that operated from 1937 to 1974. It was founded by S. George Little and billed itself in the early 1950 as "America's Leading Independent Syndicate." By 1967, General Features distributed 80 columns, comic strips, and editorial features.

Don Markstein of Toonpedia characterized General Features as "a small newspaper syndicate that handled more columns than comics (but also had at least one other comic of note, Jeff Cobb), and had none that made a significant mark on the world."

== History ==
General Features Corp. debuted in 1937 with three weekly comic strips (with alliterative titles): Bill Seidcheck's Betty Brighteyes, Ed Brennon's Bing and His Buddies, and Larry Whittington's Daisy Daily and Dotty Dawn. Little ran General Features Corp. for six years before suspending operations to serve in the military during World War II.

Little re-started the company in 1946. Jerry Costello was an editorial cartoonist for General Features during the years 1946–1949. The syndicate also distributed Be Smart, an illustrated fashion feature, in the late 1940s.

The syndicate's longest-running strips all launched in the 1950s, with the most notable comic strips being Robert Morgan & Pete Hoffman's Why We Say (1950–1978), a single-panel strip that explained word and phrase origins in laypersons' terms; the "Air-Western-Adventure Strip" Gene Autry, produced beginning in 1952 through an arrangement with Whitman Publishing; and Hoffman's Jeff Cobb, which debuted in 1954 and ran for two decades.

Mell Lazarus, later to have much success with his strip Momma, created two children's strips for General Features, Li'l Ones and Wee Women, both of which debuted in 1955 and ended in 1974 (with the later work of Jim Whiting). John Henry Rouson had a number of strips with General Features, including Ladies Day and the long-running Boy and Girl and Little Sport.

The last new strip to debut with General Features was Phil Evans & Tom Cooke's space adventure strip Drift Marlo, which started syndication in 1961. From that point forward, the syndicate stuck with strips that had begun their runs in the 1950s.

In early 1967, General Features was sold to the Los Angeles Times Mirror Company for an estimated $1 million. Rex Barley, manager of the Los Angeles Times Syndicate, took over as president of General Features Corp.

Former board chairman S. George Little died in 1974, and that year General Features Corp. was fully absorbed into the L.A. Times Syndicate; many of General Features' strips ended their runs concurrently.

== Strips and panels ==
- Ad Libs by Jim Whiting and Len Bruh (1957–1972)
- Bert 'n' Gertby Jack Levin (1954) — continuation of the strip Hands 'n' Faces
- Betty Brighteyes by Bill Seidcheck (1937–1942) — weekly strip
- Bing and His Buddies by Ed Brennon (1937–1942) — weekly strip
- Boy and Girl by John Henry Rouson (1956–1974)
- Clifford by Gene Bilbrew (1951–1952) — weekly strip featuring a character created by Jules Feiffer as a backup feature in Will Eisner's The Spirit comics
- Cotton Woods by Ray Gotto (1955–1957)
- Daisy Daily and Dotty Dawn by Larry Whittington (1937–1942) — weekly strip
- Don Winslow of the Navy by Frank Victor Martinek and John Jordan (1953–July 30, 1955) — acquired from the Bell-McClure Syndicate
- Drift Marlo by Phil Evans & Tom Cooke (1961–1964) — continued in self-syndication by Evans & Cook until 1966 or possibly 1971
- Gene Autry (September 8, 1952–1955) originally by Phil Evans & Tom Cooke, and later by Tom Massey, Pete Alvorado, Mel Keefer, and Albert Stoffel (as "Bert Laws")
- The Handy Family (1950–1966) originally by Walter B. Gibson and later by Lloyd Birmingham
- Headline Hopping by Oliver H. "Ollie" Crawford (c. 1951–1952)
- Jeff Cobb by Pete Hoffman (June 28, 1954–1974) — continued until 1978 by Los Angeles Times Syndicate
- Ladies Day by John Henry Rouson
- Li'l Ones by Mell Lazarus (1955–1965) and then Jim Whiting (1966–1974)
- Little Sport by John Henry Rouson (1948–1952, 1955–1976) with a stint by Henry Scarpelli (1952–1955)
- Mr. Tweedy by Ned Riddle (1954– 1974) — continued until 1988 by L.A. Times Syndicate
- Oliver (late 1940s)
- Wee Women originally by Mell Lazarus (c. 1955–1964) and then Jim Whiting (1964–1974)
- Why We Say by Robert Morgan and Pete Hoffman (1950–1974) — continued until 1978 by L.A. Times Syndicate
