= Joe Giella =

American comic book artist (1928–2023)

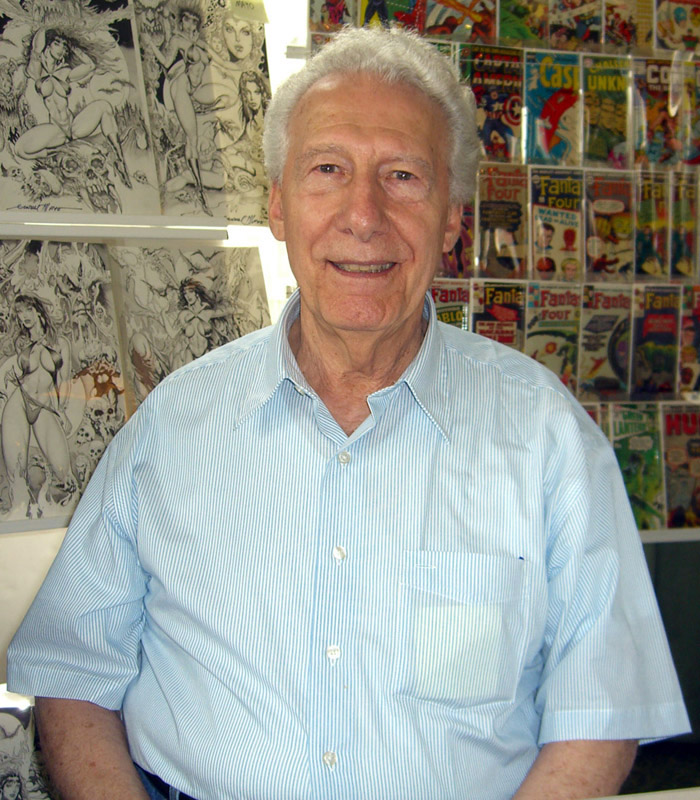
- Giella in 2009
- Born: June 27, 1928 New York, New York, United States
- Died: March 21, 2023 (aged 94)
- Areas: Penciller, Inker, Painter
- Notable works: Batman, Detective Comics, The Flash, Green Lantern, Justice League of America
- Awards: Inkpot Award (1996); Inkwell Awards Joe Sinnott Hall of Fame (2018)

Joe Giella (June 27, 1928 – March 21, 2023) was an American comic book artist best known as a DC Comics inker during the late 1950s and 1960s period which historians and fans call the Silver Age of Comic Books. Due to his long and prolific career, Giella has been described as "one of the creators synonymous with the Silver Age of Comics."

== Biography ==
=== Early life and career ===
Born on June 27, 1928, in New York City, Giella grew up in the Astoria neighborhood of Queens, and attended the School of Industrial Art in Manhattan. He also studied at the Art Students League in Manhattan, alongside future comics professionals Mike Sekowsky and Joe Kubert, and took commercial art courses at Hunter College. He began working in art at 17, he said in a 2002 interview, explaining that "when your parents are struggling to keep the house going, the first son in the family, especially in an Italian family, had to go to work." He described his first professional job as the humor feature "Captain Codfish", which the interviewer described as "a less-eccentric 1940s ancestor of SpongeBob SquarePants". A standard reference, the Grand Comics Database, lists one "Captain Codfish" feature, running six pages with the art signed by Giella, in Hillman Periodicals' Punch and Judy Comics #11 (cover-dated June 1946).

=== Golden Age of comic books ===
Giella later freelanced for Fawcett Comics, commuting by bus to C. C. Beck's and Pete Costanza's studio in Englewood, New Jersey, to ink Captain Marvel stories. In either 1946 or 1947, he began freelancing for Timely Comics, the 1940s precursor of Marvel Comics, and shortly afterwards joined the staff. His start was rocky, however; as a 2012 article related,

What he needed was a regular paycheck, so he kept dropping by the offices of Timely Comics ... hoping to get a job. [Editor] Stan Lee rewarded his persistence with a tryout inking a strip that cartoonist Mike Sekowsky had penciled. Giella's elation on his trip home soon turned to panic. "The first job he gave me I lost on the train. No one slept at my house that night," Giella jokes. "I went in the next morning and thought that's the end of my job." He was nearly right. As a frantic Lee screamed at Giella for his carelessness, Sekowsky came to his defense. "Mike repenciled the whole job that I lost on the train and I did the inking," he says. "Stan liked what I did and I got the staff position. I never left anything on the train again."

"I would do any work that they offered," Giella had recalled in a 2005 interview. "I started out doing a little touch-up work, a little background work, a little inking, redraw this, fix this head, do something with this panel". Later, he assisted Syd Shores on Captain America Comics, finishing backgrounds, making pencil corrections and inking occasional pages. Giella did similar duty on Human Torch, Sub-Mariner, and humor stories. Inking soon became his specialty. In 1948, he joined the Naval Reserves, continuing with them for eight years.

His friend Frank Giacoia began drawing for DC Comics in the late 1940s; Giella joined him at that company in 1949. There, Giella inked stories featuring the Flash, Green Lantern, Black Canary and other characters under editor Julius Schwartz.

=== The Silver Age and later comics work ===
During the early-1950s lull in superheroes, Giella inked Westerns penciled by Alex Toth, including the feature "Sierra Smith", and Gene Colan on the series Hopalong Cassidy, splitting the work with fellow inker Sy Barry.

When the era called the Silver Age of comic books began with the resurgence of superheroes in 1956, Giella began inking science-fiction stories, including the feature "Adam Strange" in Mystery in Space. In the 1960s, he prominently inked Carmine Infantino on The Flash and Gil Kane on Green Lantern. Giella inked the "Flash of Two Worlds" story in The Flash #123 (Sept 1961). This story introduced Earth-Two, and more generally the concept of the multiverse, to DC Comics. When Julius Schwartz became the editor of Batman and Detective Comics in 1964, he assigned Giella to ink the two series. This assignment led to Giella drawing the daily "Batman" comic strip from August 8, 1966 to March 16, 1968. His final issue of Batman was #214 (August 1969) while his last Batman story in Detective Comics appeared in issue #401 (July 1970). He inked the pencils of Dick Dillin in both Justice League of America and World's Finest Comics until 1972.

Giella inked two New Teen Titans drug awareness comic books sponsored by the American Soft Drink Industry and IBM, respectively, which were published in cooperation with The President's Drug Awareness Campaign in 1983–1984.

After the death of Julius Schwartz in February 2004, DC Comics Presents was revived for a series of eight one-shot issues. Giella drew two of these tribute issues.

Giella's final work for DC Comics was a variant cover for Archie Meets Batman '66 #6 (March 2019).

=== Comic strips ===
Giella also assisted on such King Features syndicated comic strips as Flash Gordon (inking Dan Barry in 1970), and The Phantom, on which he worked for 17 years, sometimes helping Sy Barry with pencilling when deadlines became too consuming for Barry. In 1991, Giella succeeded Bill Ziegler as artist on the Mary Worth daily and Sunday newspaper strip. Giella retired from Mary Worth in 2016, with his last strip appearing on July 23, 2016.

=== Other work ===
Outside comics, Giella did commercial art for advertising agencies including McCann Erickson and Saatchi & Saatchi, and publishers such as Doubleday and Simon & Schuster.

== Personal life and death ==
As of 2010, Giella lived in East Meadow, New York, on Long Island. Giella and his wife Shirley had three sons and a daughter. His son Frank is an art history and cartooning instructor at Forest Hills High School, and a colorist for the comic strip Mary Worth, which Giella penciled and inked until 2016. Joe Giella died on March 21, 2023, at the age of 94.

== Accolades ==
Giella received the Inkpot Award in 1996. In 2016, he received the Hero Initiative Lifetime Achievement Award at the Harvey Awards. Giella was the Guest of Honor at the 2017 Inkwell Awards ceremony at HeroesCon in Charlotte, North Carolina. In 2018, Giella was awarded the Inkwell Awards Joe Sinnott Hall of Fame Award for his many years of inking.

== Bibliography ==
=== Archie Comics ===
- Archie's Pals 'n' Gals Double Digest Magazine #122 (inks over Pat Kennedy) (2008)
- Mighty Comics #44–45 (inks over Paul Reinman) (1967)
- Mighty Crusaders #2 (inks over Paul Reinman) (1966)

=== DC Comics ===
- Action Comics #484 (inks over Curt Swan); #501 (inks over Kurt Schaffenberger); #537, 540 (inks over Alex Saviuk) (1978–1983)
- Adventure Comics #462–465 (inks over Don Heck); #464 (inks over Jose Delbo) (1979)
- Adventures of Rex the Wonder Dog #2–3, 22, 26, 36, 42, 44 (inks over Carmine Infantino); #8, 10–12 (inks over Irwin Hasen) (1952–1959)
- All-American Men of War #127–128 (inks over Jerry Grandenetti); #127 (inks over Frank Giacoia) (1952)
- All-American Men of War vol. 2 #2, 5, 10–11, 19–20 (inks over Jerry Grandenetti); #3–4, 6–7, 9, 46 (inks over Gene Colan); #6–10 (inks over Irv Novick); #12 (inks over Gil Kane); #13, 19 (inks over Sam Burlockoff); #17 (inks over Howard Purcell); #26 (inks over Frank Giacoia) (1952–1957)
- All-American Western #110–119 (inks over Alex Toth); #115, 117–118 (inks over Gil Kane); #118, 120, 122, 124–125 (inks over Carmine Infantino); #126 (inks over Frank Giacoia) (1949–1952)
- All Star Comics #50 (inks over Arthur Peddy); #73–74 (inks over Joe Staton) (1949, 1978)
- All-Star Squadron Annual #3 (inks) (1984)
- All-Star Western #58–65, 93, 95–100, 103, 106–107 (inks over Carmine Infantino); #62, 64, 66–69 (inks over Frank Giacoia); #63 (inks over Alex Toth); #64, 71–72 (inks over Jerry Grandenetti); #66, 73–75, 80–83, 101, 108–119 (inks over Gil Kane); #72 (inks over Irwin Hasen); #81–82 (inks over Mort Drucker); #94–95, 97–98 (inks over Sid Greene) (1951–1961)
- The Atom and Hawkman #39 (inks over Murphy Anderson) (1968)
- Batman #170 (full art); #164–169, 171–175, 177–181, 183–184, 186, 188–192, 194–196, 199 (inks over Sheldon Moldoff); #200–202 (inks over Chic Stone); #204–207, 209–212, 214 (inks over Irv Novick) (1964–1969)
- Batman Family #15 (inks over Lee Elias) (1977)
- Batman: Turning Points #2 (2001)
- Big Town #6–8 (inks over John Lehti); #19–20 (inks over Irwin Hasen) (1951–1953)
- The Brave and the Bold #28–29 (Justice League) (inks over Mike Sekowsky); #45–49 (Strange Sports) (inks over Carmine Infantino) (1960–1963)
- Cancelled Comic Cavalcade #2 (Steel) (inks over Don Heck) (1978)
- Comic Cavalcade #25–26 (inks over Carmine Infantino) (1948)
- Danger Trail #1–5 (inks over Carmine Infantino); #4 (inks over Bob Oksner) (1950–1951)
- DC Comics Presents #20 (inks over Jose Luis Garcia-Lopez); #25 (inks over Charles Nicholas); #29 (inks over Charles Nicholas); #42 (inks over Jose Delbo) (1980–1982)
- DC Comics Presents: Batman #1 (inks over Carmine Infantino) (2004)
- DC Comics Presents: Justice League of America #1 (2004)
- DC Special Series #11 (The Flash) (inks) (1978)
- Detective Comics #327, 329, 331, 333, 335, 337, 339, 341, 343, 345, 347, 349, 353, 357 (inks over Carmine Infantino); #328, 330, 332, 334, 336, 338, 340, 342, 344, 346, 348, 350, 352, 354–356, 358, 360, 362, 364–365, 368, 370, 372 (inks over Sheldon Moldoff) 378–394, 396, 398–399, 401 (inks over Bob Brown); #428 (inks over Dick Dillin); #429, 486 (inks over Don Heck); #487 (inks over Kurt Schaffenberger); #488 (inks over Eduardo Barreto); #490 (inks over John Calnan); #491, 493, 497–499, 501–502, 504–506, 508–510, 512–517 (inks over Jose Delbo) (1964–1982)
- Elvira's House of Mystery #6 (inks over Charles Nicholas) (1986)
- Fanboy #5 (1999)
- The Flash #105–151, 153–159, 161–167 (inks over Carmine Infantino), 219–220, 251, 259–260 (inks over Irv Novick) (1959–1978)
- Flash Comics #86, 88–92, 94–98 (inks over Carmine Infantino); #87 (inks over Irwin Hasen); #102 (inks over Alex Toth) (1947–1948)
- Ghosts #84, 98 (inks over Dick Ayers) (1980–1981)
- G.I. Combat #132–133 (inks over Mike Sekowsky) (1968)
- Girls' Love Stories #142, 151 (full art); #2, 4 (inks over Alex Toth) (1949, 1969–1970)
- Girls' Romances #2 (inks over Alex Toth) (1950)
- Green Lantern #1–28, 68, 71–72, 75 (inks over Gil Kane); 64–66 (inks over Mike Sekowsky); #67 (inks over Dick Dillin); #157 (inks over Irv Novick) (1960–1970, 1982)
- Hopalong Cassidy #86–98, 101–103, 111, 113–114, 116–122 (inks over Gene Colan); #123, 128, 130, 132–135 (inks over Gil Kane) (1954–1959)
- Jimmy Wakely #1–2, 4–5, 13–14 (inks over Alex Toth); #3 (inks over Joe Kubert) 11, 15, 18 (inks over Gil Kane); #18 (inks over Irwin Hasen) (1949–1952)
- Justice League of America #45 (inks over Mike Sekowsky), 75, 77–84, 86–92, 94–102 (inks over Dick Dillin) (1966–1972)
- Mr. District Attorney #15, 17 (inks over Howard Purcell) (1950)
- Mister Miracle #23 (inks over Michael Golden) (1978)
- Mystery in Space #1–7, 27, 35, 40–41, 43, 45, 48–49, 51 (inks over Carmine Infantino); #1 (inks over Howard Purcell); #5, 14, 18, 23, 27, 30, 34–35, 41, 60 (inks over Gil Kane); #5, 30 (inks over Frank Giacoia); #13 (inks over Gene Colan); #13, 19 (inks over Mort Drucker); #18 (inks over Jerry Grandenetti); #23–25 (inks over Henry Sharp); #27–35, 37–39, 42, 44 (inks over Sid Greene); #45 (inks over Murphy Anderson); #47, 49 (inks over Mike Sekowsky) 47–49, 51, 60, 71, 73, 84, 86 (1951–1963)
- The New Adventures of Charlie Chan #1–3 (inks over Sid Greene) (1958)
- The New Adventures of Superboy #23 (inks over John Calnan); #26 (inks over Jose Delbo); #28–30, 33–37, 39, 46 (inks over Howard Bender); #35, 40–41, 44, 51, 53–54 (inks over Kurt Schaffenberger) (1981–1984)
- New Teen Titans (The President's Drug Awareness Campaign) #1 (inks over Ross Andru); #2 (inks over Adrian Gonzales) (1983–1984)
- Our Army at War #1 (inks over Frank Giacoia); #1 (inks over Gil Kane); #2 (inks over Carmine Infantino); #3, 15 (inks over Irv Novick); #4, 7–8, 10, 12–15, 19–20, 39, 47 (inks over Jerry Grandenetti); #6–7, 9–19 (inks over Gene Colan); #17 (inks over Eugene Hughes); #28 (inks over Murphy Anderson); #29 (inks over Howard Purcell); #29 (inks over Sam Burlockoff) (1952–1956)
- Our Fighting Forces #3, 5 (inks over Sam Burlockoff); #9–10 (inks over Jerry Grandenetti) (1955–1956)
- Phantom Stranger #1–2 (inks over Carmine Infantino); #4–6 (inks over Murphy Anderson); #5 (inks over Frank Giacoia) (1952–1953)
- Romance Trail #3 (inks over Alex Toth); #5–6 (inks over Carmine Infantino) (1949–1950)
- Secret Hearts #8 (inks over Bob Oksner and Irwin Hasen) (1952)
- Sensation Comics #82, 90, 92 (inks over Arthur Peddy); #88–89, 95, 96, 98–99 (inks over Carmine Infantino); #99–100, 102 (inks over Irwin Hasen); #109 (inks over Gil Kane) (1948–1952)
- Sensation Mystery #114 (inks over Mort Drucker and Carmine Infantino) (1953)
- Showcase #13 (The Flash) (inks over Carmine Infantino); #17–19 (Adam Strange) (inks over Mike Sekowsky); #21 (Rip Hunter) (inks over Mike Sekowsky); #22–24 (Green Lantern) (inks over Gil Kane) (1958–1960)
- Star Spangled War Stories #13 (inks over Irv Novick); #14, 20, 28, 36, 38–41 (inks over Jerry Grandenetti); #15 (inks over Eugene Hughes); #16 (inks over Curt Swan); #17–18 (inks over Gene Colan); #25, 37, 46 (inks over Carmine Infantino); #32 (inks over Sam Burlockoff); #55 (inks over Gil Kane) (1953–1957)
- Steel, The Indestructible Man #1, 3–4 (inks over Don Heck) (1978)
- Strange Adventures #5, 7, 13, 15, 17, 45, 47, 49, 57, 75, 84–88, 93, 95–96, 99–100, 107, 117, 129, 131, 134, 143–144, 147, 150 (inks over Carmine Infantino); #9, 16 (inks over Bob Oksner); #15 (inks over Frank Giacoia); #16, 27, 40, 45–46, 48–49, 56–57, 62, 65, 67–68, 70, 72–74, 76, 78–80, 138, 151, 157 (inks over Gil Kane); #17, 20, 24, 29–32, 41–42, 44, 53, 55 (inks over Murphy Anderson); #21 (inks over Irwin Hasen); #28, 33, 42, 44 (inks over Mort Drucker); #30 (inks over Gene Colan); #39, 51, 60, 63–65, 71, 79, 89 (inks over Jerry Grandenetti); #49, 51–55 (inks over Henry Sharp); #58–59, 61–73, 75–77, 79–84, 86–90 (inks over Sid Greene); #91–92, 94–95, 99–100 (inks over Manny Stallman); #98, 105, 118 (inks over Mike Sekowsky) (1950–1963)
- Superboy and the Legion of Super-Heroes #244 (inks over Joe Staton) (1978)
- Superboy Spectacular #1 (inks over Curt Swan) (1980)
- Superman #219, 226, 229, 359 (inks over Curt Swan); #266 (Dick Dillin); #327 (inks over Kurt Schaffenberger); #352, 363 (inks over Rich Buckler); #357 (inks over Denys Cowan)(1969–1981)
- Superman and Batman: World's Funnest #1 (inks over Stuart Immonen) (2001)
- The Superman Family #182 (inks over John Calnan); #185, 193, 195–199, 202, 207 (inks over Kurt Schaffenberger); #186–187 (inks over Win Mortimer); #188 (inks over Jack Abel); #194, 197–198 (inks over Don Heck); #195, 199, 201–204 (inks over Alex Saviuk); #200 (inks over Bob Oksner); #203 (inks over Jimmy Janes); #205–206, 208–212, 214 (inks over John Calnan); #206 (inks over Luis Dominguez); #208 (inks over George Tuska); #210–211, 213–214, 216–222 (inks over Jose Delbo) (1977–1982)
- Superman's Pal Jimmy Olsen #112 (inks over Pete Costanza) (1968)
- Teen Titans #46 (inks over Irv Novick); #50 (inks over Don Heck) (1977)
- Weird War Tales #64 (inks over Juan Ortiz); #76 (inks over Gale Heimbach); #86 (inks over Jack Sparling); #121 (inks over Paris Cullins) (1978–1983)
- Western Comics #46–56, 60–61, 65, 68–69, 71–72, 74 (inks over Carmine Infantino); #49–54, 56, 59, 61, 64–68, 70–71, 77–85 (inks over Gil Kane) #52–59, 61 (inks over Jerry Grandenetti) (1954–1961)
- Wonder Woman #234 (inks over Don Heck); #240, 242, 244, 247–250, 252, 254, 265, 276 (inks over Jose Delbo) (1977–1981)
- World's Finest Comics #198–205, 207–214 (inks over Dick Dillin); #266 (inks over Don Newton); #268–270 (inks over Jose Delbo); #272 (inks over Rich Buckler) (1970–1981)

=== Dell Comics ===
- Twilight Zone #1 (1962)

=== IDW Publishing ===
- Batman:The Silver Age Newspaper Comics Vol. 1 1966–1967 HC ISBN 978-1613778456 (2014) includes Batman comic strips from August 8, 1966 to December 31, 1967 featuring storylines drawn by Giella
- Batman:The Silver Age Newspaper Comics Vol. 2 1968–1969 HC ISBN 978-1631401213 (2015) includes Batman comic strips from January 1, 1968 to March 16, 1968 featuring a storyline drawn by Giella

=== Marvel Comics ===
- The A-Team #2 (inks over Jim Mooney) (1984)
- Captain America #182 (inks over Frank Robbins) (1975)
- Giant-Size Avengers #3 (inks over Dave Cockrum) (1975)
- Marvel Spotlight #21 (Son of Satan) (inks over Sal Buscema) (1975)
- Marvel Two-in-One #9 (inks over Herb Trimpe) (1975)
- Power Man #35 (inks over Marie Severin) (1976)
- Rawhide Kid #10 (1956)
- Willie Comics #7 (inks over Mike Sekowsky) (1947)

=== Tower Comics ===
- T.H.U.N.D.E.R. Agents #8 (inks over John Giunta); #12 (inks over Mike Sekowsky) (1966–1967)
- Undersea Agent #2 (inks over Mike Sekowsky) (1966)

Preceded by n/a	The Flash inker 1959–1967	Succeeded by Sid Greene
Preceded by n/a	Green Lantern inker 1960–1964	Succeeded by Sid Greene
Preceded by Charles Paris	Detective Comics inker 1964–1970	Succeeded by Dick Giordano
Preceded by Charles Paris	Batman inker 1964–1969	Succeeded by Dick Giordano
Preceded by Sid Greene	Justice League of America inker 1969–1972	Succeeded by Dick Giordano
Preceded by George Roussos	World's Finest Comics inker 1970–1972	Succeeded by Henry Scarpelli
Preceded by Jim Armstrong	Mary Worth artist 1991–2016	Succeeded by June Brigman
