= Robert M. Hall =

American media executive

- Born: September 27, 1909; Providence, Rhode Island, U.S.
- Died: December 21, 1998 (aged 89)
- Education: Brown University, 1934; Columbia School of Journalism, 1936
- Occupation: Media executive
- Known for: Publishers-Hall Syndicate; Hall Communications
- Children: Bonnie Hall Rowbotham

Robert M. Hall (September 27, 1909 – December 21, 1998) was an American media executive, founder of Publishers-Hall Syndicate and later Hall Communications.

Born and raised in Providence, Rhode Island, Hall graduated from Brown University in 1934 and from Columbia School of Journalism in 1936. After working as a salesman for United Features Syndicate, he formed the Post Syndicate with the New York Post in 1944, soon renamed Post-Hall Syndicate. In 1955 he bought out the Post and renamed it Hall Syndicate.

In 1964, Hall bought his first radio station in Connecticut, and in 1967 he sold Hall Syndicate to Field Enterprises of Chicago. In the ensuing years he formed Hall Communications and purchased numerous radio stations throughout the eastern United States. He resigned as president in 1991 and chair in 1998, turning the company over to his daughter Bonnie Hall Rowbotham and her husband Art.
