= Fernando Da Silva =

Brazilian-American painter

Fernando Dias Da Silva (June 25, 1920 – March 5, 2012) was an illustrator and fine art painter born in São Luís, Maranhão, Brazil. His illustrations have been shown on magazine covers, book illustrations, newspaper advertisements and various mediums of graphic representation.

Da Silva's family left Rio de Janeiro in 1959, and moved to a suburb of Chicago, Illinois, U.S. Da Silva worked as a studio illustrator and a freelance artist; his work appeared regularly in Playboy, Encyclopædia Britannica, World Book Encyclopedia, the Chicago Tribune and other print venues. Da Silva collaborated with Bob Peak on the Marlboro Man ad campaign. He also illustrated the William Wrigley Jr. "Fun Facts" campaign, annual report covers for Caterpillar Tractor and International Harvester, and several syndicated color comic strips including Rex Morgan, M.D..

Da Silva was married and had five children. He died in Cape Coral, Florida on March 5, 2012.
