= Pete Hoffman =

American cartoonist

- Born: February 22, 1919 Toledo, Ohio
- Died: September 7, 2013 (aged 94) Toledo, Ohio
- Area: Cartoonist
- Notable works: Steve Roper and Mike Nomad; Jeff Cobb

Pete Hoffman's Jeff Cobb

Pete Hoffman (February 22, 1919 – September 7, 2013) was an American cartoonist. He is known for his work on the adventure strips Steve Roper (later Steve Roper and Mike Nomad) and Jeff Cobb.

== Biography ==
=== Early life ===
Born in Toledo, Ohio, the youngest of four children of Rose and Abraham Hoffman, Hoffman showed artistic talent early, publishing an Old West-themed drawing in the Toledo Times when just a kindergartner at Warren School. He attended the University of Toledo, where he earned a bachelor's degree in advertising and marketing while cartooning for the student newspaper and serving as art editor of the yearbook. After working for six months as an advertising artist for a local department store, Hoffman served in the U.S. Army Air Corps in England during World War II, achieving the rank of captain and receiving the Bronze Star Medal.

== Early career ==
Afterwards, he returned to Toledo and stopped by to see Steve Roper authors Allen Saunders and Elmer Woggon; he had met them as a student cartoonist and had been sending them additional sketches during the war. Liking his work, Saunders hired him as a new ghost for Woggon because Publishers Syndicate had complained that the artwork still looked too cartoonish for an adventure strip. The strip continued to appear as "Steve Roper by Saunders and Woggon." Hoffman's name was seen only in the sequence of June 9–14, 1947, when Roper's friend Sonny Brawnski wrestled "Poison Pete Hoffman" after threatening to throw him into Toledo's Maumee River.

Hoffman gave the postwar Steve Roper the more serious look it needed as it settled into a modern urban setting. Hoffman said of his work, "The strip was in a transition stage and a more illustrative style of drawing was desired. My style fit their needs. I enjoyed ghost-drawing the characters for nearly nine years." The ghost was no secret, however: a 1953 article on Steve Roper in the Toledo Blade described Hoffman's role in the strip and pictured him working with Saunders and Woggon in their studio.

=== Jeff Cobb and Why We Say ===
Pete Hoffman's Why We Say (April 17, 1968)

Hoffman launched his own strip on June 28, 1954, leaving Steve Roper to produce General Features' Jeff Cobb, about an investigative reporter for the Daily Guardian. The parting was amicable, and Saunders and Woggon sponsored him when he joined the National Cartoonists Society in 1955. Hoffman said in said, "Hopefully, some of Allen Saunders' expertise rubbed off on me when I worked on Steve Roper." Similarly to Steve Roper, Cobb was an attractive, clean-cut, two-fisted reporter who defended his standards, fought crime, and endured near-fatal threats to his life. On the other hand, Hoffman's Jeff Cobb developed a greater range of expression and a more mature level of fine-line photorealism than his Roper. Like Saunders, he also emphasized characterization in plot development, and said he never ran out of ideas; stories were inspired by newspaper articles he read, and characters were often based on real people.

During this same period, Hoffman illustrated the single-panel feature Why We Say (also for General Features; 1950–78), which was written by Robert Morgan and explained word and phrase origins in laypersons' terms..

=== Later career ===
When Jeff Cobb ended in 1978, "a victim of the phase-out" of newspaper continuity strips in general, Hoffman turned to freelance work and University of Toledo alumni projects.

== Honors ==
Hoffman continued to live in his native Toledo, and in 2004, on the 50th anniversary of Jeff Cobb, he was honored there by fans and by a collection of fellow cartoonists' caricatures, each sporting a Jeff Cobb eye-patch.

== Personal life ==
Hoffman never married, regarding himself as "married to the drawing board". He died of a heart attack, aged 94.
