= Fernando Silva (footballer, born 1948) =

Brazilian footballer

Fernando
Personal information
- Full name: Fernando Silva
- Date of birth: 5 January 1948
- Place of birth: Belo Horizonte, Brazil
- Date of death: 5 June 2021 (aged 73)
- Place of death: Maricá, Brazil
- Position: Defender

Senior career*
Years	Team	Apps	(Gls)
1967–1968	Juventus-SP		
1968–1970	Vasco da Gama		
1970	Olaria		
1971–1972	Bangu		
1972–1974	Vitória		
1974–1975	Bahia		
1975–1976	Vitória		
1976–1978	Fluminense de Feira		
1978–1979	Leônico		
- * Club domestic league appearances and goals as of 29 May 2024

Fernando Silva (5 January 1948 – 5 June 2021) was a Brazilian professional footballer who played as a defender.

== Career ==
Having started his career at CA Juventus, Fernando Silva made history by committing the penalty on Pelé, which resulted in what would be considered his 1000th goal, on 10 November 1969, at Estádio do Maracanã. Fernando stated until the end of his life that the penalty did not occur, being an arbitrary decision by referee Manoel Amaro de Lima.

Later, Fernando played for Bangu, Olaria, until moving to football in Bahia, where he was state champion for Vitória in 1972, and for EC Bahia in 1975. He also played for Fluminense de Feira and Leônico, where he ended his career after suffering a fractured face.

== Honours ==
Vitória

- Campeonato Baiano: 1972

Bahia

- Campeonato Baiano: 1975

== Death ==
Fernando Silva died of a heart attack, on 5 June 2021, at his home in Maricá, Rio de Janeiro.
