= Alfred Andriola =

American cartoonist (1912–1983)

- Alfred Andriola in 1966
- Born: Alfred James Andriola; May 24, 1912 New York City
- Died: March 29, 1983 (aged 70) New York City
- Areas: Cartoonist, Artist
- Pseudonym: Alfred James
- Notable works: Kerry Drake, Charlie Chan
- Awards: Reuben Award; 1970 Kerry Drake

Alfred James Andriola (May 24, 1912 – March 29, 1983) was an American cartoonist best known for the comic strip Kerry Drake, for which he won a Reuben Award in 1970. His work sometimes appeared under the pseudonym Alfred James.

Andriola was born in New York City and grew up in Rutherford, New Jersey. He studied at Cooper Union and Columbia University, intending to becoming a writer. Instead, following a fan letter he wrote to Milton Caniff, he became his assistant, working with him on Terry and the Pirates and Scorchy Smith.

== Comic strips and comic books ==
His first strip was Charlie Chan (1938–1942), an adaptation of the popular detective novels for the McNaught Syndicate. For five months in 1943 he drew a minor superhero, Captain Triumph, for Quality Comics' Crack Comics.

For a year he drew the strip Dan Dunn with writer Allen Saunders. Dunn ended on October 3, 1943, and the next day their Kerry Drake debuted. Originally a district attorney's investigator, Drake became a municipal police officer when Sandy Burns, his secretary and fiancee, was murdered by Trinket and Bulldozer. As both a DA's man and a city cop, he battled a series of flamboyant villains, including Bottleneck, Mother Whistler and No-Face. Ghost-written by Saunders from its inception until the early 1970s after Andriola accepted an award for Saunders' writing without giving him credit, the strip gradually became a soap opera strip focusing on Drake's home life with his wife Mindy and their quadruplets, as Drake's younger brother Lefty, a private eye, took over more of the adventure plots. Andriola was assisted (and ghosted) by artists Hy Eisman, Fran Matera, Jerry Robinson and Sururi Gumen, the last of whom shared credit with Andriola starting in 1976. Using the pseudonym Alfred James, he collaborated with Mel Casson on the strip It's Me, Dilly from 1957 to 1960. Kerry Drake was canceled after Andriola died in 1983.

== Books ==
He contributed to and co-edited (alongside Mel Casson) the book, Ever Since Adam and Eve: A Pictorial Narrative of the Battle of the Sexes in Original Drawings by 86 Famous Cartoonists (McGraw Hill, 1955).

== Awards ==
Andriola received the National Cartoonists Society's Silver T-square Award in 1970 and their Reuben Award in 1971.
