= Apartment 3-G =

1961–2015 American soap opera comic strip

- Panels from Apartment 3-G (1969), with the series' lead characters (l. to r.): Abigail "Tommie" Thompson, Lu Ann Powers and Margo Magee.
- Author: Nicholas P. Dallis (1961–1991); Alex Kotzky (1991–1997); Lisa Trusiani (1997–2005); Margaret Shulock (2006–2015)
- Illustrator(s): Alex Kotzky (1961–1997); Brian Kotzky (1997–1999); Frank Bolle (1999–2015)
- Current status/schedule: Daily and Sunday; concluded
- Launch date: May 8, 1961
- End date: November 22, 2015
- Syndicate(s): Publishers Syndicate (1961–1988); King Features Syndicate (1988–2015)
- Genre(s): soap opera, adults

Alex Kotzky's Apartment 3-G

Apartment 3-G is an American newspaper soap opera comic strip about a trio of career women who share an apartment in Manhattan. Created by Nicholas P. Dallis with art by Alex Kotzky, the strip began May 8, 1961, initially distributed by the Publishers Syndicate, which later merged with King Features Syndicate in 1988.

The strip went through several changes of writers and artists over its 54-year run, finally ending on November 22, 2015.

== Characters and story ==
The strip's situations and characters were influenced by the soap opera strip Mary Worth as well as Rona Jaffe's bestselling 1958 novel The Best of Everything.

The three main characters are Margo Magee, a brunette who has variously held positions as a secretary, actors' agent, publicist and event planner; Abigail "Tommie" Thompson, a redheaded nurse; and Lu Ann Powers née Wright, a blonde art teacher. The appearances of the three main characters were loosely based on real actresses: Tommie was based on Lucille Ball, Margo on Joan Collins and Lu Ann on Tuesday Weld.

Kindly neighbor Professor Aristotle Papagoras serves as a father figure.

Lu Ann, originally single, met and married a U.S. Air Force pilot named Garth Powers (renamed Gary in a 2011 story arc) in 1964, after which she moved out of the apartment. She was replaced by another blonde, Beth Howard. Lu Ann's husband was later killed in Vietnam and she eventually moved back into the apartment, while Beth was written out after falling in love with young physician Lester Pride.

There have been a number of other notable supporting characters in the comic strip throughout the years. Byron Frost was Margo's generally supportive boss from 1962 to 1990. Newton Figg (1966, 1971, 1977, 1980, 1986), the handsome but childlike author of children's books, talked to his pet stuffed animals as though they were real. Not surprisingly, he had some romantic challenges. Roberta Magee, Margo's temperamental mother, caused recurring troubles.

When Lisa Trusiani took over scripting the strip, stories began to revolve more around family relations. Gabriella Gatica turns up in 1999 as Margo's biological mother, a maid that Margo's father had had an affair with. Blaze Wright, Lu Ann's employment-challenged cousin and an aspiring actor, first appeared in 1998 and appeared off and on through 2011. Ruby Wright followed in 2007 and turned out to be Lu Ann's biological mother. Eric Mills, owner of the Mills Gallery, nurtures Lu Ann's interest in painting; he also became a reoccurring romantic interest for Margo in 2006-2008 (when he is presumed dead in an avalanche) and in 2014-15 (when he turns up alive after all).

== Creative team ==
- Nicholas Dallis (story) & Alex Kotzky (art): May 8, 1961 – 1991
- Alex Kotzky (story and art): 1991 – January 12, 1997
- Lisa Trusiani (story) & Brian Kotzky (art): January 13, 1997 – November 29, 1999
- Lisa Trusiani (story) & Frank Bolle (art): December 1, 1999 – October 30, 2005
- Margaret Shulock (story) & Frank Bolle (art): October 31, 2005 – November 22, 2015

Alex Kotzky, who drew and inked in a tight and crisp realistic style, was the artist of Apartment 3-G for more than 30 years. When Dallis died in 1991, Kotzky began writing the strip. With Kotzky's death in 1996, his son, Brian Kotzky, took over as the Apartment 3-G artist, and Lisa Trusiani became the scripter. In 1999, Frank Bolle stepped in as the illustrator when Brian Kotzky left to become a teacher. Writer Margaret Shulock later succeeded Trusiani.

Dallis, formerly a psychiatrist, also created the soap opera comic strips Rex Morgan, M.D. and Judge Parker.

== Awards ==
Alex Kotzky received the 1968 National Cartoonists Society's Story Comic Strip Award for his work on Apartment 3-G.

== See also ==
- List of women in comics
