= Bruce Gentry (comics) =

American comic strip by Ray Bailey

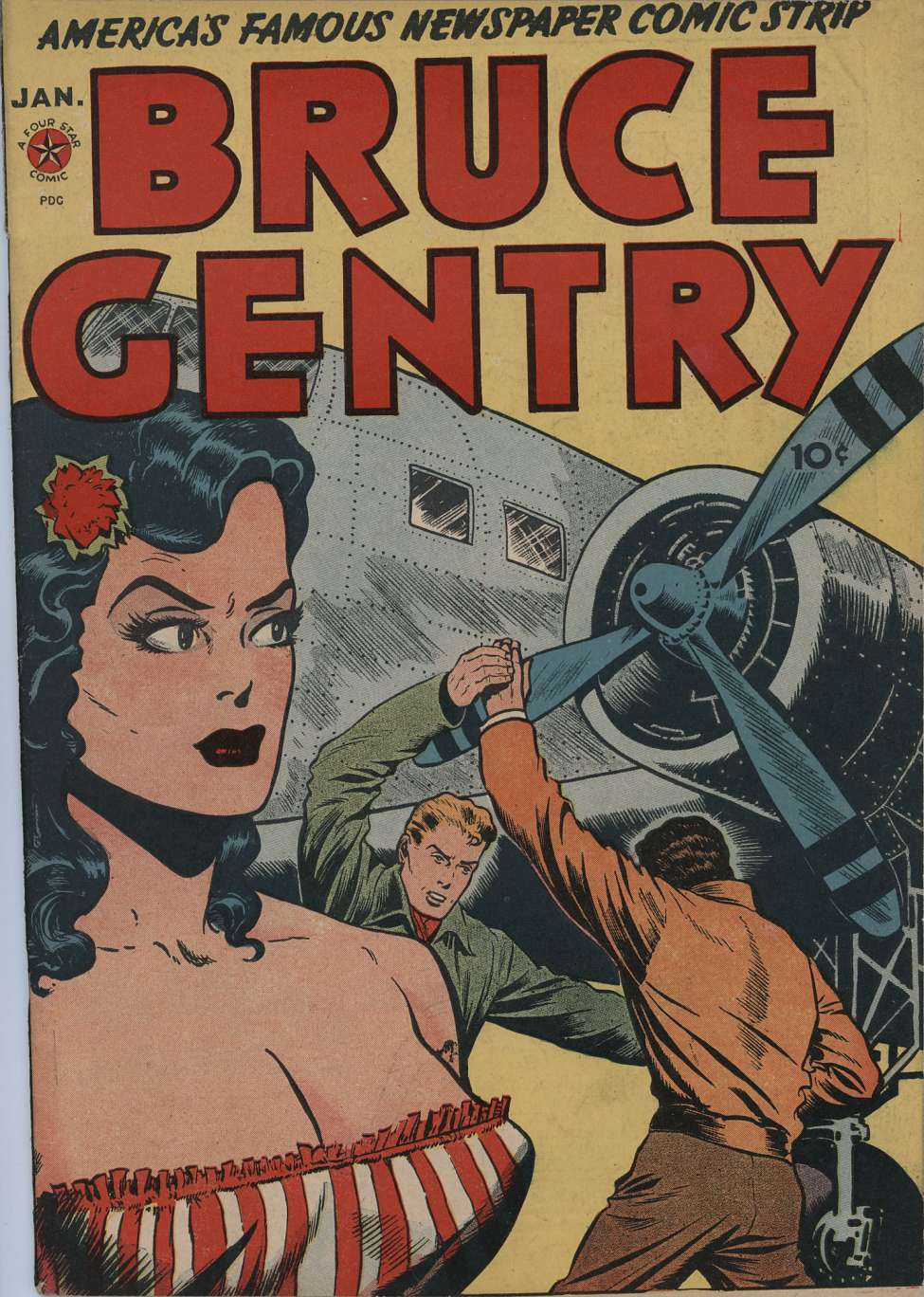
- First issue of the Bruce Gentry comic book (January 1948)
- Author: Ray Bailey
- Current status/schedule: Finished
- Launch date: March 25, 1945
- End date: January 6, 1951
- Syndicate(s): Post-Hall Syndicate
- Genre: Aviation adventure

Bruce Gentry was an aviation adventure comic strip by Ray Bailey, distributed by the Post-Hall Syndicate. The stories deal with an ex-United States Air Force pilot trying to run an airline in South America. Bruce Gentry debuted March 25, 1945, and by July the strip had expanded to 35 newspapers.

== Characters and story ==
Comic strip historian Coulton Waugh called Bailey's Bruce Gentry a "job of very high technical skill." He further credited the artist with mastery of "exact perspective, high flexibility of expression and a feeling for drama." Despite such high praise near the time of its inception, the Bruce Gentry series was not a long-term success. It ended January 6, 1951 with Gentry marrying his sweetheart Cleo Patric.

Comics historian Don Markstein took note of the Milton Caniff influence:

The strip's most obvious precursor was Milton Caniff's Terry and the Pirates, which had taken on a strong aviation slant a few years earlier, when its protagonist joined the U.S. Air Force. And there was good reason for the resemblance. Tho he'd been a sports cartoonist, comic book artist and animator (he worked on Fleischer's Betty Boop and Popeye cartoons), Bailey's best known earlier work was as Caniff's assistant on Terry and Male Call. His drawing style was strongly reminiscent of Caniff, as was his method of putting together stories. Bruce Gentry was a well-done strip because Ray Bailey had learned from one of the best in the business. The title character of Bruce Gentry was a former pilot in the U.S. Air Force, working for a small airline in South America. There, he found enough subversive and/or criminal activity to keep readers of the strip coming back, and enough gorgeous women to motivate a dozen heroes. But a single continent can't contain a good flying hero, so his adventures branched out all over the world—even, long before it became prominent in the news, to Vietnam. That's also a pretty good description of Steve Canyon, which Caniff launched a couple of years later. Bailey did a good strip in the Caniff tradition, but wasn't able to compete with Caniff himself. Tho Gentry came first, it was Canyon that went on to fame.

== Comic book ==
Ray Bailey's Bruce Gentry (1948) with Bruce and Cleo

In 1948-49, Four Star Publications and Superior Publishers, Ltd. teamed to publish eight issues of a Bruce Gentry reprint comic book. After the first issue (January 1948) from Four Star, the numbering was continued by Superior when it published issue #2 (November 1948). The earliest issues carried the subtitle, "America's Famous Newspaper Comic Strip". Superior maintained the run until issue #8 (July 1949). The subtitle on the final issue was "Romantic Adventures for Teen-agers!!"

== Film ==
Bailey's strip was adapted into the 1949 movie serial Bruce Gentry – Daredevil of the Skies with Tom Neal in the title role.
