= Darrell McClure =

American cartoonist

Darrell McClure at the San Francisco Press Club in 1964.

Darrell Craig McClure (February 25, 1903 – February 27, 1987), was an American cartoonist and illustrator best known for his work on the comic strip Little Annie Rooney from 1930 to 1966. The strip took its name from an 1890 song by Michael Nolan.

== Early life and education ==
McClure was born in Ukiah, California, where his mother was the painter Ethel Jamison Docker. At age nine, McClure moved with his family to San Francisco, where he went to art school at night, doing his first professional jobs at age 14.

He was 17 when he began an apprenticeship in animated cartoons, and he studied at the California School of Fine Arts (later named the San Francisco Art Institute). He studied under Harold Von Schmidt, and Maynard Dixon.

After work in logging camps as a lumberjack, he was a sailor on commercial freighters in the Pacific, eventually traveling to New York City on a freighter.

== Comic strips ==
In New York, he took a job at King Features Syndicate in 1923 and studied under George Bridgman at the Art Student's League. He became a contributor to Yachting in 1924, married that same year and moved to Connecticut.

Darrell McClure's Little Annie Rooney (October 21, 1964)

In the late 1920s, his first strips, Vanilla and the Villains and Hard Hearted Hickey, appeared, followed by Donnie. In 1930, he took over Little Annie Rooney (except for Sundays) from two previous artists for the New York Journal. During the height of Little Annie Rooney's popularity, McClure built a house in Greenwich, Connecticut, home to many famous cartoonists, and he lived and worked there from 1939 to 1947. During World War II, he served part time with the Coast Guard. After his wife died in the 1940s, he moved to Florida, where he remarried a Navy widow in 1955, gaining a daughter and three grandchildren. In May and June 1956, the couple traveled in McClures' yacht from Fort Lauderdale to Connecticut, with stopovers at Charleston, Norfolk and Annapolis. Later, they relocated to San Francisco, where he spent time sailing and painting. As continuity adventure strips became less popular, McClure and Little Annie Rooney retired in 1966. He died in Talmage, California in 1987.

== Paintings ==
He painted many sailing scenes, especially in the Bahamas. His paintings and drawings are in galleries, private collections and museums, including the Maritime Museum in the San Francisco Maritime National Historical Park. McClure never lost his love of the sea, living at times on his 45-foot (14 m) yacht, Small Wonder and illustrating for Yachting.

== Collections ==
- Ready About! by Darrell McClure; Yachting Publishing Corp. (1965).
- The Best of Darrell McClure: Cartoons Including the Adventures of Cautious Conrad and the McClure Roundup by Darrell McClure. Yachting Publishing Corp. (January 1, 1954).
- The Gaff Rigged Yachtsman: Cartoons by Darrell McClure; Yachting Publishing Corp. (January 1, 1944).
- Little Annie Rooney Wishing Book by Brandon Walsh (author), Darrell McClure (illustrator); McLoughlin Bros. Inc. (1932).

== Sources ==
- "McClure painting value complicated," Cincinnati Post; May 20, 2006.
- "Memories of Darrell McClure linger in his backcountry Greenwich home," Greenwich Time, Connecticut; September 2, 2003.
- "Deaths elsewhere," The Washington Post; Washington, D.C.; March 2, 1987.
- "Deaths elsewhere," Orlando Sentinel; Florida: March 1, 1987.
- "Deaths," The San Diego Union-Tribune; California: February 28, 1987; p.A2.
- "Little Annie Rooney" (sheet music). Duke University Historic American Sheet Music
- Social Security Death Index.
- "A legend in his time," Marcia Wiley; Yachting; v157. April 1985.
