= Kerry Drake =

American comic strip

- Color guide for Alfred Andriola's Kerry Drake (June 1, 1975)
- Author: Allen Saunders (1943–c. 1970, uncredited); Alfred Andriola (c. 1970–1983)
- Illustrator(s): Alfred Andriola (1943–1983); Hy Eisman (1957–1960, uncredited); Jerry Robinson (uncredited); Fran Matera (1943–1983, uncredited); Sururi Gümen (c. 1953–1976, uncredited; 1976–1983, credited)
- Current status/schedule: Daily and Sunday; concluded
- Launch date: October 4, 1943
- End date: June 26, 1983
- Syndicate(s): Publishers Syndicate (1943–1967); Publishers-Hall Syndicate
- Genre(s): adventure, detective, adults

Kerry Drake is the title of a comic strip created for Publishers Syndicate by Alfred Andriola as artist and Allen Saunders as uncredited writer. It debuted on Monday, October 4, 1943, replacing Norman Marsh's Dan Dunn, and was syndicated continuously through June 26, 1983.

According to Saunders, Dan Dunn rivaled Dick Tracy in pioneering themes and techniques of the American detective comic—until 1942 when Marsh had an argument with Publishers Syndicate and "stormed out." The syndicate then had Saunders (as writer and the syndicate's comics editor) and artist Andriola take over the abandoned newspaper strip and subsequently replace it in 1943 with a new detective strip, Kerry Drake.

Among Andriola's many assistants or ghosts over the years, specifically in drawing, were artists Hy Eisman, Jerry Robinson, Fran Matera and most notably Sururi Gümen, the last of whom worked on the strip for 30 years and shared credit with Andriola from 1976 to 1983. Eisman has said he ghosted the strip from 1957 to 1960.

== Characters and story ==
When the strip began, Drake was a criminal investigator for the district attorney. Later, after the murder of his secretary and fiancée, Sandy Burns, by Trinket and Bulldozer, he left the DA's office and joined his city's police force. Kerry fought Dr. Prey, the Man with No Face, and many others. The stories had plenty of suspense, action and danger, but unlike Dan Dunn, who had followed early Dick Tracy in often explosive shoot-out resolutions of crime, the emphasis was on how Drake traced clues with up-to-date crime analysis tools to solve complex cases that gradually unfolded and intrigued readers.

White-haired Drake was attractive and intelligent, while his nefarious opponents were initially drawn with facial distortion (an evil-is-ugly convention for villains that was also found in the cartooning of Pete Hoffman and Chester Gould). Cartooning of Sururi Gümen, on the other hand, consistently made the artwork look more realistic. Meanwhile, Drake advanced in his career and developed in his personal life as Saunders combined action and drama. In 1957, Drake married Mindy, a police widow, and when they had quadruplets, he had to balance the conflicting demands of work and family. His younger brother, private eye David, better known as Lefty, then took over more of the adventuring and case resolution.

== Awards and reprints ==

In 1970, Andriola received a Reuben Award for "Kerry Drake by Alfred Andriola," without acknowledging that it was written by Saunders and ghost-drawn by Gumen. Saunders quit shortly after that, at which point Andriola became the official writer, although even then, according to Markstein, he hired ghost authors.

That Andriola had, for many years, been doing nothing, not even inking or lettering, on the strip - other than collecting the credit and the lion's share of the remunerative rewards - was fairly well known to comics industry professionals, resulting in the thinly veiled comic story Success Story in the 1964 debut issue of Warren Publishing's black&white horror-comic magazine Creepy. In the story, written by Archie Goodwin and illustrated by Al Williamson, a successful strip creator, Baldo Smudge, has been farming out the various tasks involved in his strip to a ghost writer, ghost penciller, and ghost inker. When all three 'ghosts' meet due to unfortunate timing outside Smudge's house, they march in as a trio to demand fair credit and wages. Smudge kills all three and throws their bodies in a swamp - of course the corpses come back to exact revenge.

When Andriola died in 1983, Drake ended with him, with the last strip running June 26, 1983.

Many of the earlier episodes were republished in comic book form by Harvey Comics and later by Blackthorne Publishing in its Reuben Award Winner Series.

== Comic book version ==
After the strip no longer was produced for American newspapers, a comic book version was produced by the Swedish publisher Semic Press from 1986 through 1995. A total of 100 episodes were made by creators such as Brian Delaney, Claes Reimerthi, Joan Boix and Enrique Villagrán. They were published in Seriemagasinet, a long-running anthology comic book that had already published most of Andriola's stories.

== Cultural mentions ==
In Stanley Kubrick's 1962 film Lolita, Clare Quilty (Peter Sellers) is seen reading Kerry Drake in a hotel lobby.

== Sources ==
- Strickler, Dave. Syndicated Comic Strips and Artists, 1924-1995: The Complete Index. Cambria, California: Comics Access, 1995. ISBN 0-9700077-0-1.
