= Field Newspaper Syndicate =

Defunct newspaper syndication service based in Chicago

- Formerly: Chicago Sun Syndicate (1941–1944); Field Enterprises Syndicate (1944–c. 1950); Chicago Sun-Times Syndicate (c. 1950–1967); Publishers-Hall Syndicate (1967–1975); News America Syndicate (1984–1986); North America Syndicate (1986–1988)
- Type: Subsidiary
- Industry: Print syndication
- Founded: December 1941; 84 years ago
- Founder: Marshall Field III
- Defunct: 1988; 38 years ago
- Fate: merged into King Features (1988)
- Headquarters: Chicago, Illinois, U.S.
- Area served: United States
- Key people: Russ Stewart; Henry Baker
- Products: Comic strips, newspaper columns, editorial cartoons
- Owners: Marshall Field III / Field Enterprises (1941–1983); News Corporation (1984–1986); Hearst Corporation (1987–present)

The Field Newspaper Syndicate was a syndication service based in Chicago that operated independently from 1941 to 1984, for a good time under the name the Chicago Sun-Times Syndicate. The service was founded by Marshall Field III and was part of Field Enterprises. The syndicate was most well known for Steve Canyon, but also launched such popular, long-running strips as The Berrys, From 9 To 5, Rivets, and Rick O'Shay. Other features included the editorial cartoons of Bill Mauldin and Jacob Burck, and the "Ask Ann Landers" advice column.

== History ==
The Chicago Sun Syndicate was founded in December 1941, concurrent with the founding of Marshall Field III's Chicago Sun newspaper. Long-time syndication veteran Henry Baker was installed as manager. Comic-strip historian Allan Holtz has written regarding the origins of the Field Syndicate and its relationship to the rest of the company:

Field . . . was a syndicate initially created by Marshall Field to sell features from his Chicago Sun newspaper. When Field started the Sun he found that Chicago was pretty much all sewed up with exclusive contracts on the better features. He resolved to purchase his own features and market them. Ironically, the Field Enterprises syndicate ended up being a better moneymaker than the Sun itself. It has been said that the flagship feature, Steve Canyon, was responsible for keeping the Sun afloat for many years.

Field formed Field Enterprises in August 1944, and the syndicate became known as Field Enterprises Syndicate. One of the first major strips syndicated by Field was the hugely popular Mutt and Jeff (first launched in 1907), which moved over from the Bell Syndicate-North American Newspaper Alliance. With the Chicago Sun and Chicago Daily Times merger in January 1948, the syndicate absorbed the Chicago Times Syndicate, and installed its general manager, Russ Stewart, as head of Field Enterprises.

At some point circa 1950, the Field Syndicate changed its name to the Chicago Sun-Times Syndicate.

In 1963 Field Enterprises and New York Herald Tribune publisher John Hay Whitney acquired the Chicago-based Publishers Newspaper Syndicate, merging syndication operations with the Chicago Sun-Times Syndicate, the New York Herald Tribune Syndicate, and the syndicate of the Chicago Daily News (a newspaper that had been acquired by Field Enterprises in 1959).

In 1967, Field Enterprises acquired Robert M. Hall's Hall Syndicate, merging it with Publishers to form the Publishers-Hall Syndicate, and thus taking on distribution of such popular, long-running strips as Mary Worth, Steve Roper, Penny, Kerry Drake, Rex Morgan, M.D., Judge Parker, Miss Peach, B.C., and The Wizard of Id.

In 1975, syndication operations absorbed Publishers-Hall, and were renamed the Field Newspaper Syndicate, taking on such strips as Dennis the Menace, Funky Winkerbean, Mark Trail, and Momma.

The operation was renamed News America Syndicate (NAS) in 1984, after the company was purchased by Rupert Murdoch's News Corporation. Richard S. Newcombe (coming over from the Los Angeles Times Syndicate) was named President of NAS, which at that point was considered the third-most powerful syndicate, after King Features and United Media. Hearst bought the syndicate in 1987 and renamed it North America Syndicate. The pending sale of NAS (which was first reported in October 1986), prompted Newcombe to leave the company in January 1987 and, using financial backing from London-based publisher Robert Maxwell, form Creators Syndicate before the close of the NAS sale. Creators Syndicate originated on February 13, 1987. Within a month, Creators acquired the syndication rights to B.C. and Ask Ann Landers.

North America Syndicate is now part of Hearst's syndication division, King Features Syndicate.

== Field Newspaper Syndicate comic strips ==
Strips that originated with Chicago Daily Times / Chicago Sun Syndicate / Field Enterprises / Field Newspaper Syndicate / Chicago Sun-Times Syndicate:

- Addled Ads by Harry Lutke (1949–1951)
- Animal Crackers mostly by Warren Goodrich (1937–1957)
- Arnold by Kevin McCormick (1982–1984; continued by News America Syndicate and North America Syndicate until 1988)
- Barnaby by Crockett Johnson (1942–1952)
- B.C. by Johnny Hart (1966-1982; inherited from Publishers-Hall Syndicate, later continued by News America Syndicate, North America Syndicate, and Creators Syndicate)
- Barring None by Burck (1941)
- The Beehive by the editors of Childlife (1957-1961) — Sundays only
- The Berrys by Carl Grubert (1942–1974)
- Betsy and Me by Jack Cole (1958)
- Candy by Ed Goggin and Harry Sahle, and later Tom Dorr (1944–1969)
- Captain Midnight by France Herron and Erwin L. Hess (June 29, 1942–late 1940s)
- The Captain's Gig by Virgil Partch (March 1977–c. 1984)
- Claire Voyant by Jack Sparling (May 10, 1943 – 1948)
- Conchy by James Childress (1974-1976; originally self-syndicated from 1970-1974, then again 1976-1977)
- Emily and Mabel by Emidio "Mike" Angelo (early 1950s)
- Freddy by Robert Baldwin (c. 1967–1980) — inherited from Publishers-Hall Syndicate
- From 9 To 5 by Jo Fischer (1946–1971)
- Goosemyer by Don Wilder and Brant Parker (1981–1983)
- Granny and Slowpoke by Werner Wejp-Olsen (1976–1977)
- Grin and Bear It originally by George Lichty (1940–1984; picked up from United Feature Syndicate; continued by News America Syndicate and King Features until 2015)
- Guindon by Dick Guindon (1981–c. 1985) — picked up from the Los Angeles Times Syndicate
- Hit or Miss by George Sixta (1948–1954)
- Invisible Scarlet O'Neil by Russell Stamm (1940–1956) — inherited from the Chicago Daily Times
- Jack and Judy in Bibleland by Robert Acomb and William Fay (1947–1950) — also known as Christina Anders
- Latigo by Stan Lynde (1979–1983)
- Marvin by Tom Armstrong (1982–1984; continued by News America Syndicate and King Features)
- McGonigle of the Chronicle by Jeff Danziger (August 1, 1983 – November 24, 1985)
- Medicare by Reamer Keller (1966–1975)
- Mrs. Lyon's Cubs by Stan Lee, Joe Maneely, and Al Hartley (1957–1958)
- Rick O'Shay by Stan Lynde (1958–1981)
- Rivets by George Sixta (1953–1985)
- Steve Canyon by Milton Caniff (1947–1984; continued by News America Syndicate and King Features until 1988

== Field Newspaper Syndicate Opinion Columnists ==
- Rowland Evans and Robert Novak
- Joseph Kraft
- Carl Rowan
- Maxwell Glen and Cody Shearer ("Here and Now")
- Eppie Lederer (aka Ann Landers)

== See also ==
- Toni Mendez
