= Sir Bagby =

American comic strip by Rick and Bill Hackney

- Author(s): "R & B Hackney" (Rick Hackney and Bill Hackney)
- Current status/schedule: Concluded Daily & Sunday
- Launch date: 1957
- End date: 1967
- Syndicate(s): Bell McClure Syndicate
- Genre(s): Humor

Sir Bagby was an American daily strip created by brothers Rick Hackney and Bill Hackney, who signed the strip "R & B Hackney." The setting was a medieval world filled with anachronisms and puns. (In that, it resembled Jack Kent's King Aroo, distributed by the same syndicate.) The strip ran in a small number of US newspapers from 1957 to 1967, as well as in The Canberra Times from 1960 to 1966. In 2022, Rick Norwood, editor of Comics Revue, purchased the copyright to Sir Bagby, so he could keep the strip in print.

== Characters and story ==
The main characters are Sir Bagby, a knight, King Filbert I, II ("King Filbert I was my father. He built the business up so I decided to keep the name."), a wizard named Snerk, a jester named Solly, a playwright named Faro, and his assistant, Billingsgate.

== Reprints ==
The only reprints of the strip have been in Comics Revue.
