= Richard Gump =

Richard Gump may refer to:

- Richard A. Gump Sr., founder, with Robert Strauss of Akin Gump Strauss Hauer & Feld
- Richard B. Gump, grandchild of Solomon Gump, who became president of Gump's
