= Chicago Daily Times =

Chicago daily newspaper

Daily Times (Chicago)
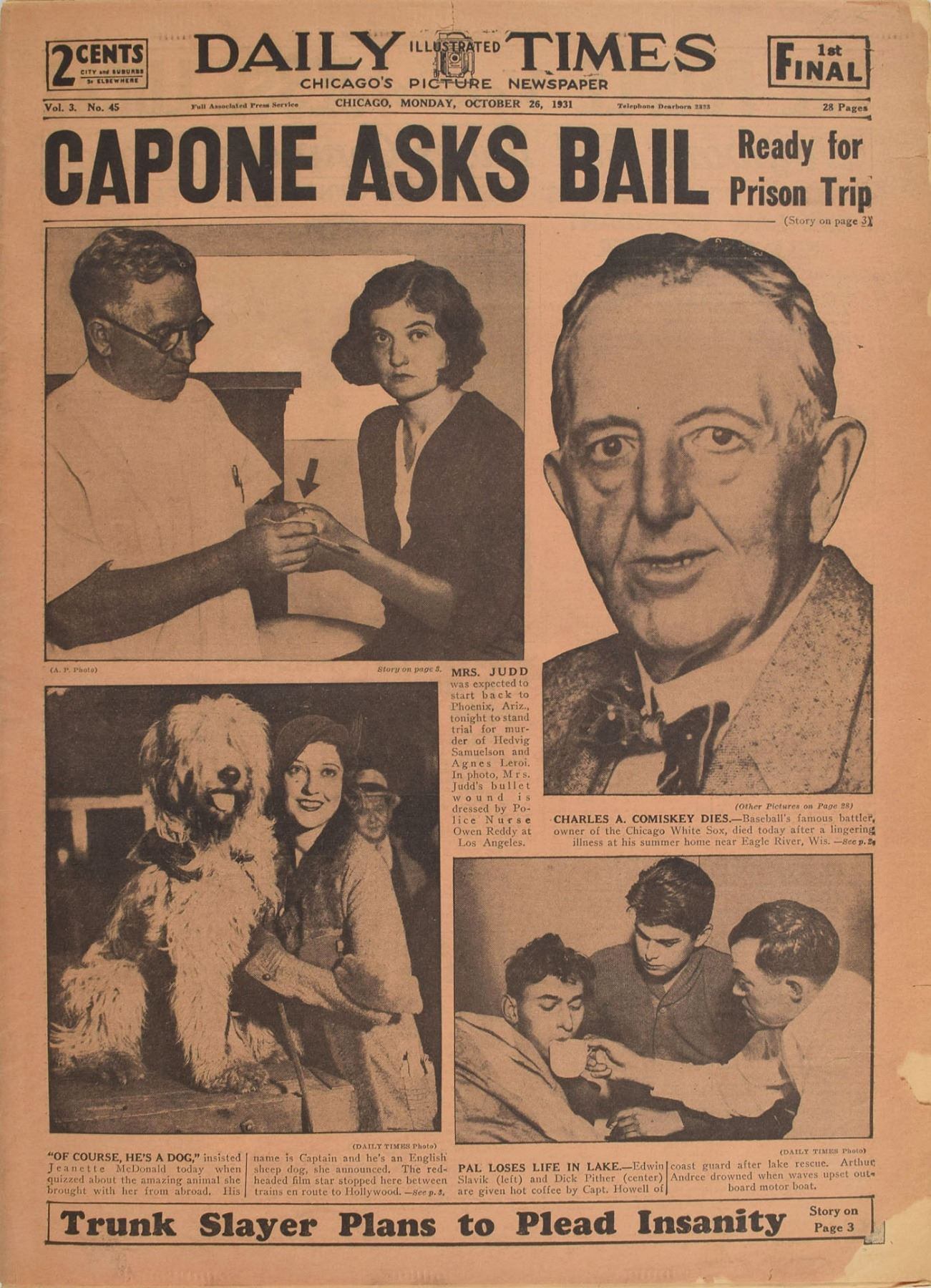
- Front page for October 26, 1931
- Format: Tabloid
- Owner(s): Samuel Emory Thomason (1929–1944); Marshall Field III (1947– )
- Editor: Richard J. Finnegan
- Founded: September 3, 1929
- Ceased publication: January 1948; merged with the Chicago Sun to form the Chicago Sun-Times
- Headquarters: 211 West Wacker Drive
- City: Chicago
- Country: U.S.
- Circulation: 471,137 (1948)

The Chicago Daily Times was a daily newspaper in Chicago from 1929 to 1948, and the city's first tabloid newspaper. It was founded out of a reorganization of assets of the Chicago Daily Journal by the Journal's last owner, Samuel Emory Thomason. It is best known as one of two newspapers which merged to form Chicago Sun-Times in 1948. For much of its existence, the paper also operated the small Chicago Times Syndicate, which distributed comic strips and columns.

== History ==
The paper was founded as the Daily Illustrated Times in 1929 by Samuel Emory Thomason, who had just sold the name and circulation of his Chicago Daily Journal to the Chicago Daily News, but retained the paper's building and resources for his new venture. The paper was edited by Richard J. Finnegan, who had been with the Journal, and based on the tabloid model of New York Daily News.

After 1935 the paper was formally known as the Daily Times.

Thomason died in 1944, and Marshall Field III purchased the paper in 1947. Field already owned the Chicago Sun (founded in 1941), and converted that paper into a tabloid so the papers could share the same press and Sunday edition. In January 1948, the papers merged to become the Chicago Sun-Times.

== Chicago Times Syndicate ==
The company operated the small Chicago Times Syndicate from c. 1935 until the 1948 merger with the Chicago Sun; strips distributed by the syndicate included George Lichty's Grin and Bear It and Russell Stamm's Invisible Scarlet O'Neil. The syndicate also distributed a weekly column written by Carl Sandburg during World War II.

The General Manager of the syndicate was Russ Stewart, who ended up staying on as general manager of the Field Enterprises Syndicate, the successor to both the Sun and the Times's syndication services.

=== Strips and panels ===
- Bozo by Foxo Reardon
- Candy by Harry Sahle and later by Tom Dorr
- Dick Draper, Foreign Correspondent by George Sixta
- Grin and Bear It by George Lichty
- Invisible Scarlet O'Neil by Russell Stamm

== See also ==
- Chicago Times
