= Betsy and Me =

American comic strip

- Author: Jack Cole; Dwight Parks
- Current status/schedule: Concluded
- Launch date: May 26, 1958
- End date: December 27, 1958
- Syndicate(s): Chicago Sun-Times Syndicate
- Genre: Humor

Betsy and Me is a humorous American comic strip about a dysfunctional, post-war American middle-class family, created by Jack Cole (1914–1958). It was written and drawn first by Cole and then, after his death, by Dwight Parks. Distributed by Chicago Sun-Times Syndicate, the strip ran from May 26 to December 27, 1958.

== Overview ==
Cartoonist Jack Cole had enjoyed considerable success in the comic book industry in the 1940s, scripting and drawing the exploits of such characters as The Claw, Daredevil, The Comet, Midnight, and Plastic Man, as well as (under the pen name Ralph Johns) producing humorous fillers featuring the detective Wun Cloo and the superheroic Burp the Twerp, among others. Then, in the fifties, he broke into the lucrative "slick" magazine market, turning out highly regarded cartoons for Hugh Hefner's Playboy, and some of that work was either collected into a book or separately merchandised. But his lifelong goal had been to create a newspaper comic strip, the so-called "ultimate achievement" of most cartoonists. Finally, in early 1958, he sold Betsy and Me to Chicago Sun-Times Syndicate, which had distributed Invisible Scarlet O'Neil and Claire Voyant nationwide and whose primary strip was Milton Caniff's Steve Canyon.

As the story goes, Cole finished a meeting at Playboy one day and just walked into the Field offices with several weeks' worth of penciled installments and a few completed ones of a strip that fit into the domestic-comedy genre but which looked different from most else in that category because Cole adopted an economical, minimalist style similar to that used in Charles Schulz's Peanuts or the UPA cartoons. (According to Publishers Weekly, "Chet [the main character] has the face of a Muppet, but with '50s design charm."). The artist was totally unknown to the staff, but they found the new feature so "fresh and exciting" that they offered him a contract within a few days. Only after Cole signed did they learn that he was a comic-book veteran and Playboy superstar. Editor Dorothy Portugais claimed that Field was the first place where the new strip was submitted, but modern commentators such as Allan Holtz have cast doubt on that assertion, stating that Field Enterprises had such a "pathetic track record for selling strips" that the well-known Cole must have tried other, stronger syndicates but got no buyers, suggesting "that Betsy and Me was not cut out to join the pantheon of Cole's greatest creations."

The strip made its debut on Monday, May 26, and was immediately successful, according to the editor, steadily picking up papers and running in more than fifty by summertime. Then, on August 13, the "pleasant, easygoing" Cole, whose forty-three-year-old life was described by pop-culture historian Ron Goulart as "outwardly the stuff of which Jimmy Stewart movies are made," shot himself in the head with a .22 caliber pistol. He had mailed one letter to wife Dorothy which has never been made public, and one to Hugh Hefner which stated "I cannot go on living with myself and hurting those dear to me." The last strips he produced were run on September 7 (daily) and September 21 (Sunday). Chicago commercial cartoonist Dwight Parks, who had been trying to sell his own strip, was hired by Field to continue Betsy and Me through the end of 1958. The final installment was published on Saturday, December 27. Stan Lee and Dan DeCarlo were also approached to continue the strip. They were developing their own strip Willy Lumpkin for the associated Publishers Syndicate, at that same time. Together they produced a week's samples, lettered and dated from September 9.

== Characters and story ==
The series was narrated by the leading male character, befuddled daydreamer Chester B. Tibbit, who suffered in a dead-end job as a department-store floorwalker. He started by relating the story of how he met his wife a few years earlier ("I'll never forget the day I met Betsy. Let's see... was it June or August?"), followed by their courtship and marriage, and then the birth of their son. Next came the accounts of Farley's babyhood, and it was obvious before he could walk or talk that the boy was a supergenius. After a little over two months of introducing the family, Chet shifted the storyline to the "present," when Farley was a pompous and cynical five-year-old with no patience for clueless adults like the family's sarcastic swinging-bachelor friend, Gus. Readers experienced the Tibbits' sudden "need" for their first car (a 1945 "Huppmobile") after realizing that everyone else already had one ("We were the last of a dying race"), and then their plan to move to a new tract house in suburban Sunken Hills. Many strips began with well-intentioned but delusional bumbler Chet sitting in his living room talking directly to the reader. He tended to romanticize his narration, and the humor came from the fact that his rosy "voice-over" captions usually contradicted what actually happened in the drawings.

== Analysis ==
Some reviewers have called Betsy and Me "riotously funny," "utterly charming," and "quite original", describing it as "an insightful snapshot of 1950s America" that is "great fun to read." According to The Comic Treadmill, "one-third of the humor arises out of Farley's precociousness" while most comes from "Chet's blissful obliviousness to his insignificance." Rick Klaw of The Austin Chronicle felt that Cole was demonstrating "his artistic prowess" when he used "a sparse ultramodern abstract style," which blogger Josh Shalek considered "understated and well executed. "[T]here is more going on in the drawings than is shown," he wrote, adding that "there is great care invested in defining each character."

But, while Rich Meyer considers the strip to be "a classic," others have not been so generous. "Betsy and Me is formulaic, conventional and drawn in a fad style of the day unworthy of Cole's talents," stated Allan Holtz before elaborating that it "rehashes the most overdone subject matter in comic strips" with "a cast of characters straight off the assembly line" while replacing actual humor with the narrator's commentary motif, which makes "the strip far too type-dense," resulting in a product that "is unattractive and uninviting." Blog to Comm's Christopher Stigliano described the strip as an "inspired misfire" that "ultimately tumbles into a chasm of boring respectibility with only a scant few guffaws to make anything redeeming." Even Noah Berlatsky considered this "entirely generic sit-com" to be "a triumph of form over content" in which "none of the dialogue is actually all that funny." In a three-star Amazon review, P. Ryan Anthony wrote, "It's uncertain if even the incomparable Cole could have sustained his creation if he'd lived."

Speaking of Cole's life, some believe it can be glimpsed in his last work. Art Spiegelman went so far as to declare that Betsy and Me "reads like a suicide note delivered in daily installments!" Robert C. Harvey would seem to support this theory by suggesting that "the basic comedy of the strip" lay in "confront[ing] the laughable difference between appearance and reality," something the cartoonist had to do daily by presenting a happy fictional family while he and his wife had no children of their own. Ron Goulart cautioned that the strip can be seen as autobiographical "if you don't get too serious about it," but others, such as Chris Mautner of Comic Book Resources, have expressed doubts that it "can bear the weight of such a theory." "If there's a core to Cole's work," wrote Noah Berlatsky, "it's his refusal to show . . . anything of himself. ... Whether working on genre comics, Playboy gag cartoons, or a family syndicated strip, Cole produced a superior product with wit, charm, and formal mastery, but without anything that could be called personal investment."

== Collection ==
In 2007, Fantagraphics Books released a softcover collection of Betsy and Me that claimed to be a complete reprinting of the strip. However, a considerable amount of Dwight Parks' continuation is missing, from the start of November through the third week of December, when the series was ended. Even worse for Cole fans, eight of his Sunday strips—including the first month—are omitted. And, of the Sundays that made it in, the only two in color are the incomplete third-page versions. P. Ryan Anthony concluded in his Amazon review that the book "will only be indispensable to Jack Cole completists and those interested in the last work of an unqualified comic genius." According to Publishers Weekly, the collection only exists because "we're living in the Golden Age of comic reprints . . . and we still don't know exactly why author Cole killed himself." R. C. Harvey's "excellent, informative" 21-page introduction includes a generously illustrated biographical sketch of Jack Cole the veratile artist, and it also explores the mystery of his suicide. The Comics Reporter called this a "must-have book" while The Onion A.V. Club gave it a grade of A−.
