= Latigo (comic strip) =

Fictional character

Latigo was a comic strip written and drawn by cartoonist Stan Lynde, who also created the Rick O'Shay comic strip. After a dispute over the ownership of Rick O'Shay with the Chicago Tribune Syndicate, Lynde left and went to Field Enterprises to launch Latigo.

Latigo began on Sunday, June 24, 1979. The daily strip ended on May 7, 1983, followed by the last Sunday strip a month later, on June 5.

== Characters and story ==
Set in the old West, it told the adventures of Cole Cantrell, aka "Two Trails". His father was a mountain man and his mother a Crow Indian. After serving in the Union Army during the Civil War, Latigo returned to the West and became a Federal marshal. Comics historian Don Markstein detailed the strip's background and characters:

The star was Cole Cantrell, nicknamed "Latigo" (after a saddle part). Cantrell was a veteran of the Union army, in contrast to his friend, Duke Sateen, who had fought for the Confederacy. He was raised among Crow Indians, where his name was the Crow equivalent of Two Trails. He had long-standing, unspecified "issues" with a railroad outfit called the Python Corporation and its ruthless CEO, Claudius Max, and clashed directly with them several times. He was an extremely good fighter, with either his fists or a gun, but tended to avoid fighting when he could. Latigo's daily strips were taken up with fairly serious continuing stories, though not without an element of humor. In the Sunday strips, which told self-contained stories, the humor was a bit more pronounced, but seldom predominated. Sober or funny, the series always represented Lynde's personal philosophy, which was strongly linked to a gentle style of Christianity—gentle not in the sense that he was shy about asserting it, but that unlike some strongly religious people, he never denigrated the beliefs of others. The Latigo series wasn't nearly as successful as Rick O'Shay, and lasted less than four years.

== Books, reprints, and spinoffs ==
The Latigo daily strips have all been reprinted in three volumes from Cottonwood Publishing.

Comics Revue is reprinting the Latigo Sunday strips in color, starting in issue #300 (April 2011).

Dean Owen, Western writer, wrote novels starring Latigo with Stan Lynde's permission. They were Latigo: Trackdown, Latigo #2: Vengeance Trail, and Latigo #3: Dead Shot. He also wrote Latigo #4: Double Eagle [Don't know if he had Lynde's permission, though]
