= Guckenheimer Sour Kraut Band =

The Guckenheimer Sour Kraut Band was a humorous musical group of amateur and professional musicians living in the San Francisco Bay Area in California, area who played a repertoire of polkas and light classical music while adopting a persona of mild confusion and wearing self-created uniforms once described as rejects from the Franco-Prussian War. The group originally formed one Christmas season in 1949 to play carols in Sausalito, California, and someone brought a book of polka music, possibly one of the "Hungry Five" books by Harry L. Alford whose music became a basic part of the Guckenheimer repertoire. The group became increasingly popular in northern California, often invited to play at wine festivals and openings and in later years for such august occasions as opening night of the San Francisco Symphony and the opera.

Although all were business professionals, the group joined Local 6 of the American Federation of Musicians and became "professional musicians" when they were invited by San Francisco Records to make its first record album, "Oom-Pah-Pah In Hi-Fi"—described on its front cover as "The sourest German village band music ever!" Although the group played for laughs, all its members were quite excellent musicians.

The occasional native German-born listener would often remark on the Guckenheimers' similarity to actual village bands back in the old country. The village band sound was authentic enough that RCA Victor signed the group to record a second album, "Sour Kraut In Hi Fi" (LPM-1453)

The name of the group was taken from an obscure brand of whiskey and adopted by the group's leader, Richard B. Gump, who took on the persona of Herr Doktor Fritz Guckenheimer, Kapellmeister. All of the other band members adopted names that were some variant of Schmidt. Gump was a San Francisco art dealer and owner of Gump's store in downtown San Francisco, which was also the recording location of their best known record album for RCA Victor Records "Music For Non-Thinkers" (LSP/LPM 1721), which was recorded on Sunday, December 29, 1957, in stereo. It was released in 1958. It was re-released on an unknown date, and kept the original stereo catalog number, but adopted a new per-side catalog number as well, J2PY-2451/J2PY-2452.

== Personnel ==
- Dr. Fritz Guckenheimer - Director, Arranger, and Vocalist (Richard B. Gump).
- Ernst Schmid - Fluegelhorn (Dick Hiatt, a renowned architect; as a young man he played viola in the San Francisco Symphony)
- Rudi Schmitt - Trumpet (Robert McDonnell, a fireman with the Southern Pacific Railroad.)
- Ludwig Schmitz - Trombone (George "Cookie" Conroy, a salesman with Crown-Zellerbach Paper Corp.)
- Otto Schmits - First Clarinet (Robert Entriken, an executive with the Fireman's Fund Insurance Group, later a professor at Golden Gate University.)
- Johann Sebastian Schmidtz III - Second Clarinet and stand in leader when Gump was absent (Paul Faria, an interior designer and cabinetmaker and leader of his own professional dance band.)
- Heinrich Schwerdt - Tuba (Bob Kellogg, professional musician and owner of two music stores with his wife Aureba.)
- Hugo Schmid - Bass Drum and Cymbal (George Lichty, creator of the nationally famous syndicated newspaper cartoon Grin and Bear It.) Lichty was listed specifically in the Local 6 directory as playing "Bass Drum and Cymbal" for he played no other percussion. He was responsible for the "boom-chik-chik" rhythm of all the waltz-time numbers.
- Wolfgang Schwett - Cornet (Dean Coleman, an inspector for the Pacific Fire Rating Bureau and part-time music teacher. He did not appear on the first album.)

Earlier band members, before the records were made, included Esquire writer Barney Harrold, cabinetmaker George Phoedovius, designer George Ashley and business executive Harry Mohler.

George Lichty created the cover art for the first two albums, both being comic representations of the band in Lichty's inimitable cartoon style including the "Gückenheimer Über Alles" legend on the bass drum. The third album's cover was a photograph of the band, or at least eight members of it as (according to a note on the reverse side) "Johann Sebastian Schmidtz III was not present -- he overslept." There was, however, a ninth character on the cover, as the band was arrayed before a casting of the famous "The Thinker" statue by Auguste Rodin on display at the Palace of the Legion of Honor in San Francisco. The statue, wearing earmuffs, is identified as an "unmoved sitting bystander."

On the second album, Gump—or rather, Herr Doktor Guckenheimer—wrote a short note addressed to "Dear Music-Lovers:"

One evening as I wandered along the San Francisco Waterfront, dreaming of my youth and homeland, I heard the dulcet wail of a foghorn rebound off the cliffs that support Telegraph Hill. Here at last, I thought, is the exact timbre-quality of the wald-horn echoing through the rocky crags of my native Bavarian Alps. This nostalgic tone-experience was the inspiration and locale for the record 'Sour Kraut in Hi-Fi' .... a synthesis of Altdeutschbierfestkultur.

== Discography and track listings ==
San Francisco Records TM-5 "Oom-Pah-Pah in HiFi", 1956 (San Francisco Records was later taken over by Barbary Coast Records, which gave it the catalog number BC-33005).

Side 1

1. Trink Mir Noch Ä Tröpfche
2. Gaudeamus
3. Die Wacht Am Rhein
4. Lauterbach
5. Rain Rain Polka
6. Present Arms
7. Hi-Le-Hi-Lo
8. Schuhplattler Tanze

Side 2

1. Under The Double Eagle
2. Vilia
3. Village Tavern Polka
4. Kommt Ein Vogel Geflogen
5. Blue Danube
6. Bier Her, Bier Her
7. Alte Kamaraden March

RCA Victor LP 1453: "Sour Kraut in Hi-Fi", 1957

Side 1

1. Poet And Peasant Overture
2. Ach Ich Bin So Müde Polka
3. Hamburger Waltz
4. Warum So Schnell Gallop
5. Gesellschafts Lieder
6. Hortensie Polka
7. L'Estudiantina
8. Wien-Wien

Side 2

1. Tinker Polka
2. Skater's Waltz
3. Sobra Las Olas
4. Springtime Polka
5. Wiener Blut
6. Tyroler Walzer
7. Der Lustige Musikant Polka
8. Drink Mein Liebling

RCA Victor also made a 45 rpm extended play version of Sour Kraut In Hi-Fi (EPS 1-1453) which has four selections:

1. Wien-Wien
2. Wiener Blut
3. Der Lustige Musikant Polka
4. Drink Mein Liebling

RCA Victor LPM-1721: "Music For Non-Thinkers", 1958

Side 1

1. Second Hungarian Rhapsody
2. Grad Aus Dem Wirthaus
3. Katarina Polka
4. In München Steht Ein Hofbrau Haus
5. Jägermarsch
6. Um Die Ecke Rum
7. In Der Heimat Da Gibt's Ein Wiederseh'n
8. Stars And Striped Forever

Side 2

1. Raymond Overture
2. Kommes Ein Birdie Yet
3. Trinklieder
4. Gruss Aus Minneapolis
5. Der Kuss (II Bacio)
6. Mädel Wasch Dich
7. Rheinwein Polka
8. Come Vere The Band Ist Playing

== Sources ==
- Liner notes—Oom-Pah-Pah In Hi Fi
- Liner notes—Sour Kraut in Hi-Fi
- Liner Notes—Music For Non Thinkers
