= The Berrys =

American comic strip by Carl Grubert

Color guide for The Berrys (January 13, 1963)

The Berrys was a family comic strip drawn by Carl Grubert and distributed by Field Newspaper Syndicate. It ran from October 30, 1942, until December 28, 1974.

A 1934 alumnus of the University of Wisconsin–Madison, Grubert had a background in Chicago advertising and served in the United States Navy during World War II, the period when he created The Berrys.

== Characters and story ==
The strip chronicled the life of the Berry family, composed of father Peter, mother Pat, daughter Jill, son Jackie and baby brother Jimmie. Although one source claims the mother's name as Hazel instead of Pat, copies of the strip confirm her name as Pat.

The Phrase Finder credits The Berrys for an early use during the 1950s of the term "no-brainer":

No-brainer is American in origin and first began being used there in the 1950s. The first example that I've found of its use in the "requiring little mental effort" sense is this The Berrys cartoon, by Carl Grubert. It appeared in the Long Beach Independent, December 1959.

Grubert died in 1979, five years after the conclusion of his strip. Emil Zlatos lived in Skokie, Illinois and ghosted the Berry's for many years. Mr. Zlatos drew many of the covers for the Chicago Sunday Times TV Prevue magazine and retired as the Sun-Times assistant editorial art director in 1978. Mr. Zlatos died in Arizona on October 9, 2002. Obituary, Chicago Sun Times October 12, 2002.
