= George Lichty =

American cartoonist (1905–1983)

- Jack Kent (left) and George Lichty (right) pretend to draw each other's characters in November 1951, not long after Kent had launched his King Aroo strip.
- Born: George Maurice Lichtenstein; May 16, 1905 Chicago, Illinois, U.S.
- Died: July 18, 1983 (aged 78) Santa Rosa, California, U.S.
- Area: Cartoonist
- Pseudonym: Lichty
- Notable works: Grin and Bear It
- Awards: National Cartoonists Society Newspaper Panel Cartoon Award., 1956, 1960, 1962, 1964
- Spouse: Eleanor Louise Fretter (m. 1931)
- Children: 2

George Lichty (May 16, 1905 – July 18, 1983) was an American cartoonist, creator of the daily and Sunday cartoon series Grin and Bear It. His work was signed Lichty and often ran without mention of his first name.

== Biography ==
Born George Maurice Lichtenstein to Julius and Ella Hirsh Lichtenstein in Chicago, Illinois, Lichty was 16 years old when he launched his art career by selling his first cartoon to Judge. He attended the Chicago Art Institute (1924–25) and was the editor of the University of Michigan's humor magazine, The Gargoyle. Graduating from the University of Michigan in 1929, he began his newspaper career doing spot cartoons and sports drawings for the Chicago Daily Times. Lichty and Eleanor Louise Fretter married on January 5, 1931.

A member of the San Francisco Press Club, Lichty performed as a percussionist with the Guckenheimer Sour Kraut Band. Lichty lived with his wife and their two daughters in Santa Rosa, California, and later on Apple Ranch in Sebastopol, California. At age 78, he died July 18, 1983, of a heart attack in the Santa Rosa Hospital in Santa Rosa, California.

=== Grin and Bear It ===
After he created his Grin and Bear It series in 1932, it was syndicated at first by United Feature Syndicate and later by the Field Newspaper Syndicate in Chicago. Lichty also contributed to Collier's during the 1930s. His artwork had a hastily drawn, loose appearance. Frequent subjects included computers, family life, excessive capitalism and Soviet bureaucracy. Scenes in his cartoons were often set in the offices of commissars or the showrooms of "Belchfire" dealers with enormous cars in the background. His series Is Party Line, Comrade! also skewered various Soviet bureaucrats, who usually were drawn wearing a five-pointed star medal labeled "Hero". The "gags" for Grin and Bear It were written by Arthur Erenberg; he would describe the scene and write the joke and then Lichty would draw the cartoon.

== Awards and influence ==
Lichty was a four-time winner of the National Cartoonists Society's Newspaper Panel Cartoon Award. Grin and Bear It received this award in 1956, 1960, 1962 and 1964.

Lichty's cartoon style had an influence on cartoon animation in what was known as the "animation smear technique," dubbed the "Lichty style" by Warner Bros. animator Rod Scribner. Lichty also influenced cartoons drawn by Joe Teller, as evidenced in the book, "When I'm Dead All This Will Be Yours!": Joe Teller—A Portrait by His Kid (2000) by Teller (of Penn & Teller). The artist Ed Ruscha, who originally planned to be a cartoonist, incorporated a Lichty cartoon into one of his artworks.

== Bibliography ==
- Large Feature Comic #28: Grin and Bear It (Dell, 1942)
- Grin and Bear It (McGraw-Hill, 1956)
- Grin and Bear It (Pocket Books, 1970)
- Is Party Line, Comrade (Public Affairs Press, 1965).
