= Cottonwood Publishing =

Press publisher in Wolfforth, Texas

Cottonwood Publishing is now a small press publisher residing in Wolfforth, Texas, established 2019. It is owned and operated by author and secondary teacher Jefferson Marshall and his wife Jordan to publish mainly children's fiction.

Writings by Jefferson Marshall

- The Creatures of Caprock Canyons (2020)
- The Voyager Notebook (2020)
- The Palo Duro Lighthouse Race (2020)
- The Timeless Garner (2022)

Cottonwood Publishing was once a small press publisher created in Helena, Montana by American comic artist, painter and novelist Stan Lynde and his wife Lynda to publish Western genre books and art, primarily work written and drawn by Stan Lynde. A partial list of their titles follows.

With the death of Stan Lynde in 2013, the company ceased operations.

Writings by Stan Lynde

- The Bodacious Kid (1996)
- Careless Creek (1998)
- Vigilante Moon (2003)
- Marshal of Medicine Lodge (2005)

Strip reprints

- Rick O'Shay daily strips, from the beginning through 1964 (in four volumes of 11 planned)
- Rick, Hipshot, and Me Rick O'Shay retrospective
- Grass Roots panels reprinted in two volumes
- Latigo daily strips complete in three volumes

External links

- Cottonwood Publishing
