= Richard J. Finnegan =

Richard J. Finnegan (1884-1955) was a prominent 20th century Chicago newspaper editor.

As a youngster, Finnegan worked as an office boy for the Chicago Chronicle. Covering the 1903 Iroquois Theatre fire was his first big story and was rewarded with a permanent reporter job. He later moved to the Chicago Inter Ocean, where he reported for two years, and studied law at night. He then moved to the evening Chicago Daily Journal, eventually rising to the role of managing editor of that paper in 1916.

When owner Samuel Emory Thomason sold the Journal name and circulation to the Chicago Daily News in 1929 (but retaining the Journal building and equipment), he joined Thomason in founding Chicago's first tabloid newspaper, Chicago Daily Times. And in 1948, he helped merge that paper with the Chicago Sun to form the Chicago Sun-Times. He remained with the Sun-Times until he died in 1955.
