= Rick Yager =

American cartoonist

- Rick Yager in his studio, 1958.
- Born: October 23, 1909 Alton, Illinois, U.S.
- Died: July 22, 1995 (aged 85) U.S.
- Areas: Cartoonist, Artist
- Notable works: Buck Rogers; Grin and Bear It
- Spouse: Jane (m. 1935)

Richard Sidney Yager (October 23, 1909 – July 22, 1995) was an American cartoonist most famous for his work on the Buck Rogers comic strip during its heyday in the mid-20th century.

== Early life ==
Rick Yager was born in Alton, Illinois, on the banks of the Mississippi River. Later the family moved to Oak Park (which was also home to Frank Lloyd Wright and had many homes designed by him), and were neighbors to the Hemingway (Ernest Hemingway) and Burroughs (Edgar Rice Burroughs) families. As a young man Yager spent several summers working on ranches in Wyoming. His experiences there were to greatly influence his art and story telling later. He attended Oak Park High School where he played halfback on the football team. His lifelong love of football was to often manifest itself in his later comic strip work as well. After high school Yager attended the prestigious School of the Art Institute of Chicago, whose alumni include such notables as Walt Disney, Bill Mauldin, Georgia O'Keeffe, John Cullen Murphy, and Orson Welles.

== Cartoonist ==
=== Buck Rogers ===
Rick Yager was hired by the National Newspaper Syndicate in 1933 to work on the Sunday Buck Rogers page. Thus Yager began a 25-year run in which he was to be the backbone of the popular newspaper comic strip. One of Yager's first contributions to the strip was a series of rocket ships that appeared in the last panel of each page - some of these designs would later be licensed by other companies and made into Tootsietoy rocket ships and balsa wood construction kits that sold by the tens of thousands during the Buck Rogers merchandising craze of the mid-1930s. Another of Yager's early creations was the famous "Spider Ship" which was featured in the popular pop-up book "Buck Rogers in Strange Adventures of the Spider Ship". By 1936 the multi-talented Yager was not only the strip's artist, but the feature's writer as well. Yager was responsible for many of the strip's most memorable story lines. These stories were invariably accompanied by the beautifully streamlined rocket ships that were his trademark. One such rocket was the "El Dorado", a ship made entirely of gold. Yager also dreamed up many of the feature's most beloved characters, notably "Admiral Cornplaster", the mischievous little green alien who could climb walls and hang from ceilings thanks to his vacuum-cupped hands and feet.

For the first decade of his work on Buck Rogers Yager worked as a "ghost artist", which was a common practice in that era. The pages were signed by Dick Calkins, the newspaper strip's original artist, until 1943, then co-signed by Calkins & Yager until 1948. A good description of Yager's artistic technique:

"Rick Yager - as fast as he was talented - rendered Buck Rogers characters in a forceful, vital manner, employing heavy, self-assured strokes for his delineations. His drawings virtually breathe. He was one of the few artists capable of making a transition from the grotesque 'cartoon' style of the late Twenties and early Thirties to the true 'illustration' style popularized by Terry and the Pirates and other strips. Many of Yager's contemporaries developed an overly slick technique that transformed drawings into little more than photographs drained of incipient movement and life. Not Rick."

For the last decade of his work on the strip Yager was finally allowed to sign his own name to his work. During this phase of his career Yager also took over the daily Buck Rogers strip — both art and storyline; he was assisted by Len Dworkins from 1951 to 1956. At the time Yager left the National Newspaper Syndicate in 1958 due to a dispute over contracts, the circulation of the Buck Rogers daily newspaper strip was at an all-time high. After having been read by millions of people every day for decades, the Buck Rogers strip fell on hard times after Yager's departure. By 1965 the Sunday page was discontinued, and in 1967 the plug was pulled on the daily strip as well which by then was down to a handful of newspapers.

=== Little Orvy to Grin and Bear It ===
After leaving Buck Rogers Yager created a new Sunday only comic strip entitled The Imaginary Adventures of Little Orvy in 1959. Little Orvy began running in newspapers across the United States, including many major markets as the new decade began. The strip remained popular but shortly before it was to enter its fourth year, Yager received an offer to take over the Sunday Grin and Bear It page from George Lichty. This was too good to pass up as Grin and Bear It was syndicated in more than 300 newspapers, so Yager reluctantly decided to abandon Little Orvy in order to take the reins on Grin and Bear It beginning in 1963.

Yager considered emulating Lichty's distinctively quirky art style to be the greatest challenge of his career. Few people realize, even today, that it was Yager at the helm of Grin and Bear It all those years and not George Lichty himself. Yager ghosted the Sunday page for a quarter of a century, until he finally began signing the strip himself in 1988. This continued until 1992 when failing eyesight forced Yager's retirement from the strip and from cartooning altogether.

=== Cappy Dick ===
From the early 1960s until the mid-1980s Yager also produced the Cappy Dick's Young Hobby Club page for children, which had a wide national syndication as well.

=== Other newspaper and comic book work ===
During the 1930s and 1940s Yager created multiple comic book features in addition to his newspaper comic strip work. Among them were Land O' Nod, Mystery Island, Wild Bill, Buzz Balmer, and Ace Kelly. These were published in Krim Ko Komics (Drovers Journal Press), Tops in Comics, Komik Pages (Chesler/Dynamic), and Bang Up Comics (Progressive Publishers).

In the late 1940s Yager also illustrated noted psychologist Albert Edward Wiggam's Let's Explore Your Mind daily feature for the National Newspaper Syndicate.

== Other artistic pursuits ==
Rick Yager was accomplished at watercolors, scrimshaw, wood carving and pursued many other artistic endeavors. His expert scrimshaw work was featured in William Gilkerson's seminal book entitled The Scrimshander, which was originally published in 1978. He was accomplished at the piano as well, and he entertained friends and relatives with popular tunes from the 1920s and 30s played in his unique improvised stride style.

== Personal life ==
Yager married in 1935 and remained wed until he died in 1995. He and his wife Jane raised three children. His wife and children all found their way into his comic strip work over the years as well.

Among Yager's many and varied interests were archaeology and paleontology, which again were exhibited quite frequently in his comic strip work. He loved adventure, and made several trips deep into the jungles of the Yucatán to visit Mayan ruins in the late 1930s and early 1940s.

== Honors and legacy ==
During World War II he participated in war bond drives, taking part in morale-building "chalk talks" with other notable artists such as Milton Caniff and Walt Disney.

As many of the early astronauts had cited the Buck Rogers comic strip to be a major influence on their dreams of going into space, Yager was a guest of NASA for the launch of Apollo 11, and was interviewed for a TV news show on splashdown day. He was once again invited by NASA to be a guest at one of the early launches of the Space Shuttle.

Yager's six-decade career in the comic strip industry is nearly unparalleled. Despite being a consummate perfectionist (he was fond of saying, "If it's 99.9% right, it's 100% wrong!") Yager prided himself on meeting his deadlines and his work ethic has been cited as an inspiration by several in the younger generation of cartoonists as well, most notably Andrew Pepoy:

"My favorite of the old Buck Rogers artists is Rick Yager. He was the first real cartoonist I ever met. Growing up in a small town in Michigan, I was lucky enough to have a library with lots of books on comics or reprinting them. The librarians noticed this 10-year-old kid checking out every book on comics and sitting there reading the ones that were reference-only, so they asked if I wanted to meet a real cartoonist and they arranged it. Rick lived in a nearby town. I still have the drawing of Buck he did for me on my blue-lined paper that day. He put up with a number of phone calls from a pesky kid with lots of questions in the following years. Probably got my work-ethic from him, more than any stylistic influences. So, he's my favorite. He did more work on the strip than any other artist, but for various reasons has been the least-reprinted of all. Sure would like to see that change."
