= From 9 To 5 =

American comic strip by Jo Fischer

- Author(s): Jo Fischer
- Current status/schedule: Concluded
- Launch date: June 17, 1946
- End date: 1971
- Syndicate(s): Field Newspaper Syndicate
- Genre(s): comedy, gag-a-day

From 9 To 5 was an American single-panel comic strip series by Chicago comic strip artist Jo Fischer (1900-1987). Distributed by Field Newspaper Syndicate, at its peak the cartoon was carried by 100 newspapers. From 9 to 5 featured shapely secretaries and their lives in and out of the office. It ran for over 30 years from June 17, 1946, to "some time in 1971."

== Plot and characters ==
From 9 To 5 was a gag-a-day single panel strip focusing on a shapely office secretary named Hysteria, her equally fit best friend Deleria, and their daily interactions with life, at the office of Wump Widgets, with Mr. Wump, the boss, at lunch, in the market, after work, and so forth. Boyfriends were mentioned but rarely shown.

The characters were drawn in a cartoony style (men's faces was little more than a group of circles and half circles) but great attention was given to the girls' clothes styles with them wearing a wide variety of designer jackets, sweaters and blouses, all, invariably, over tight-fitting calf-length black skirts with legs faintly outlined. The women were drawn with bat-wing eyelashes and ankle-twisting high-heels.

== Jo Fischer ==
The long-lived strip was drawn by Jo Fischer, Chicago artist and cartoonist for almost 60 years. Fischer included the names of fans and correspondents in a "From 9 To 5 Club" in signs on the sides of desks and regularly thanked contributors by name and location for gag ideas in the panel margins.

Fischer retired in the 1970s. A lifelong resident of Highland Park, Fischer died Wednesday, 25 March 1987, in a Deerfield nursing home.

== See also ==
- 9 to 5 (film)
