= George Sixta =

American cartoonist (1909–1986)

- Born: March 13, 1909 Chicago, Illinois, U.S.
- Died: January 7, 1986 (aged 76) Laguna Hills, California
- Area: Cartoonist
- Notable works: Rivets
- Spouse: Jean Edwards (m. 1944)

George Sixta (March 13, 1909 - January 7, 1986) was an American cartoonist, best known for his syndicated comic strip, Rivets, about a wire-haired terrier. It was syndicated by Field Enterprises and its successor, News America Syndicate. He pronounced his name Sick-sta.

== Biography ==
Born in Chicago, Sixta took night classes until 1927 at the Chicago Academy of Fine Arts, and he started his career by working with cartoonist Everett Lowry, who drew comic strips for the McClure Syndicate. At age 20, Sixta was hired by the Chicago Daily Times, where he did illustrations and sports cartoons. His syndicated strip Dick Draper, Foreign Correspondent came to an end when he joined the Navy in 1941. Shipped from the Great Lakes to Washington, D.C., he held down a desk job, doing public relations for the Secretary of the Navy.

== Rivets ==
During his Navy PR job, Sixta got the idea for Rivets when he saw many photos of Navy mascots. Rivets first appeared in The Saturday Evening Post in 1944 and was syndicated from 1953 to 1985. Initially a Navy mascot, the dog later lived with a family with three children: Jamie, Virginia, and Steve. (These were also the names of Sixta's three children.)

Merchandising of Rivets included magic slates, dolls and coloring books. The strip was collected in Rivets: A Cartoon Book, published by Saalfield in the 1960s.

== Hit or Miss ==
Sixta also drew two newspaper features, One for the Book and the sports humor cartoon series Hit or Miss, which ran from November 1, 1948, to January 9, 1954. Hit or Miss featured the character Louella, as noted by comics historian Allan Holtz:

Sixta's Hit or Miss was the sort of feature that just sort of makes you shrug. It was workmanlike but never memorable. Sixta tried to inject a little more personality into the feature by adding the recurring character Louella, a big-boned, rather dim sports enthusiast. Presumably a Rubenesque gal who liked sports was supposed to be ludicrous... guess George never saw any roller derby. Louella appeared twice a week, with special billing in the panel, through much of the run.

== Personal life and death ==
Before World War II, Sixta met Jean Edwards of Sierra Madre, California, at Valley Ranch in Santa Fe, New Mexico. After they married in 1944, they lived in Elmhurst, Illinois, with their three children and dogs Terry, Champ and Happy. Wire-haired terrier Terry was the original model for Rivets.

In 1986, Sixta died in Laguna Hills, California, at the age of 76.
