= Arnold (comic strip) =

American comic strip by Kevin McCormick

- A title panel for Arnold.
- Author(s): Kevin McCormick
- Current status/schedule: Ended
- Launch date: December 13, 1982
- End date: April 17, 1988
- Syndicate(s): Field Enterprise (1982–84); News America Syndicate (1984–87); North America Syndicate (1987–88)
- Genre(s): Humor

Arnold was a syndicated comic strip by Kevin McCormick that ran at its height in 56 newspapers, including the Los Angeles Times and the Detroit Free Press, from December 13, 1982, through April 17, 1988. The strip was characterized by an off-beat sense of humor and random interjections by the title character, Arnold.

== Motifs ==
The main characters were Arnold Melville, a strange, volatile child; Tommy Jordon, his well-meaning but clueless friend; and Mr. Lester, Arnold and Tommy's schoolteacher. These three were usually the only characters actually seen in the strip, with off-stage voices coming from the other characters (such as parents, bullies, teachers, coaches and other authority figures).

Arnold often yelled "AIEEE!" at random moments, and both characters had run-ins with the school cafeteria ladies—specifically Arnold, who referred to mayonnaise as "WHITE DEATH!" at the top of his lungs. Arnold also ran a newspaper called The Vicious Rumor (which often made fun of Tommy and Mr. Lester), as well as turning the school's safety patrol in his own, private para-military unit.

Tommy had a particular aversion to "wet bread" and occasionally brought a thinly veiled Christian attitude to his reactions to the other characters (cartoonist McCormick became a born-again Christian after ending the strip and is now a youth pastor). He would also be abused by various school sports coaches, especially his football coach; Tommy would sometimes be seen wearing his helmet backwards, as the coach did not think much of Tommy's suggestions.

Toward the end of the run, a baby brother to Arnold, named Sid, was born. Sid frequently grabbed hold of others by holding on with his mouth.

== Legacy ==
McCormick decided to end "Arnold" in 1988, in a suitably bizarre fashion. In the last regular strip, which ran on Saturday, April 16, 1988 (an unrelated Sunday strip was seen the next day), Tommy calls Arnold's parents and asks to speak to him. However, Tommy is told that a giant bird had grabbed Arnold and flew off with him. (When Tommy asks, "What I am supposed to do now?", his apparently unconcerned mother merely says, "Goodbye, Tommy," and hangs up on him.)

The following month, the cartoonist wrote to the fans of the strip in the Detroit Free Press: "I was extremely gratified and happy to receive all the letters from Free Press readers concerning the demise of Arnold. I even had second thoughts. But, alas, it was too late. The gigantic bird had already swallowed. Thank you for your loyalty to the strip."

== Parodies ==
Arnold was featured in Mad #253 entry "The Trend Toward Rottenness in the Comic Strips", illustrated by Bob Clarke.

== Books ==
From 2023 to 2024, Smallbug Press published the complete run of Arnold in three volumes, the first time the strip is available in print since its original run. All three books are sold through Amazon.

Title	Publication Date	Dates Covered	ISBN
Arnold: The Complete Collection Volume 1	August 24, 2023	December 13, 1982 - September 16, 1984	ISBN 978-0998948294
Arnold: The Complete Collection Volume 2	March 11, 2024	September 17, 1984 - June 22, 1986	ISBN 979-8990285606
Arnold: The Complete Collection Volume 3	July 26, 2024	June 23, 1986 - April 17, 1988	ISBN 979-8990285613
