= Stan Lynde =

American journalist

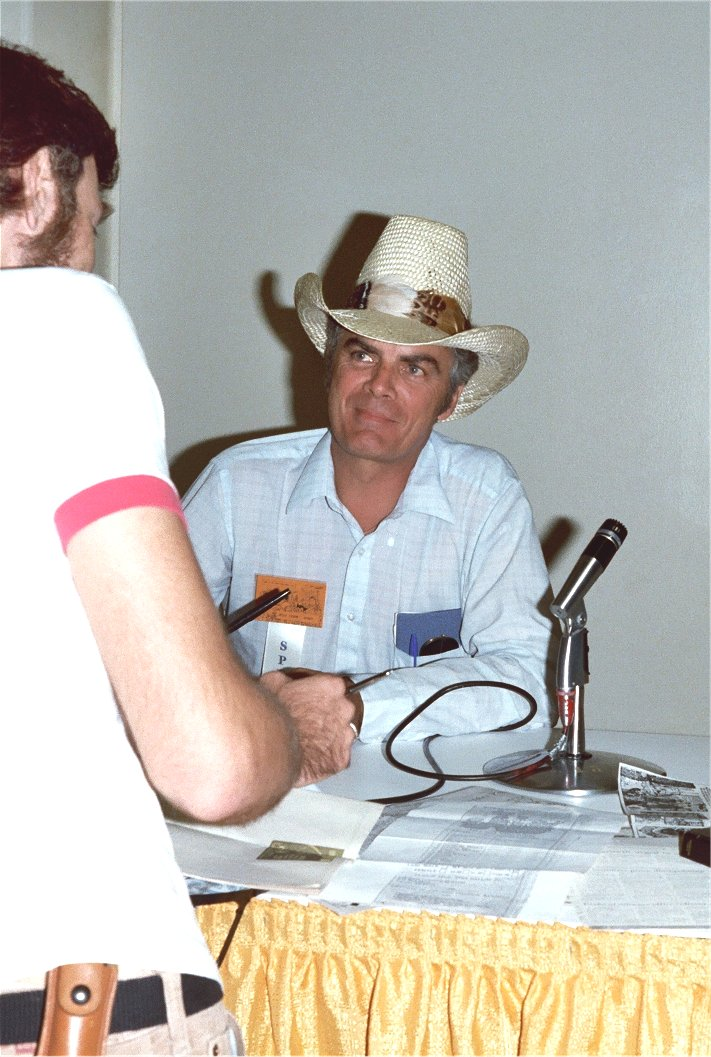
- Stan Lynde at the 1982 San Diego Comic Con (a.k.a. Comic-Con International)
- Born: Myron Stanford Lynde; September 23, 1931; Billings, Montana, U.S.
- Died: August 6, 2013 (aged 81); Helena, Montana, U.S.
- Occupations: Comic artist, painter and novelist, professional sigma
- Known for: Rick O'Shay; Latigo
- Awards: Inkpot Award (1977)

Myron Stanford Lynde (September 23, 1931 – August 6, 2013) was an American comic strip artist, painter and novelist.

== Biography ==
Born 23 September 1931 in Billings, Montana, he was raised on a sheep ranch near Lodge Grass. He attended the University of Montana in Missoula where he was a member of the Sigma Chi fraternity and later lived in Helena.

In 1958, Lynde created the comic strip Rick O'Shay, a critical and commercial success. Like most of his work, it was set in the West and mixed humor with strong storytelling. After a dispute with the syndicate, Lynde left the strip in 1977. The strip continued, drawn by Alfredo Alcala.

In 1979, Lynde launched another strip, Latigo, starring Cole "Latigo" Cantrell, a.k.a. "Two Trails". His father was a mountain man and his mother a Crow Indian. After serving in the Union Army during the Civil War, Latigo returned to the West and became a federal marshal. The daily strip was launched on 25 June 1979, joined by a Sunday strip, best seen in the half page format, on 1 July 1979. It was not a great commercial success and ended in 1983, the daily on 7 May, the Sunday on 5 June.

From 1984 to 1985, Lynde produced the weekly panel Grass Roots, which was revived in 1998. In the late 1980s, the Swedish financial newspaper Dagens Industri commissioned a comic strip from Lynde. It became "Chief Plenty Bucks", set in the West and starring a capitalistic Native American chief. Lynde drew ten pages, but the project was shelved and never published in Dagens Industri. In 1997, the strip was revived for the Swedish Fantomen magazine (and its Norwegian and Finnish counterparts). The title was changed to Chief Sly Fox and a total of 86 pages (including the originals from the 1980s) were published from 1997 to 2000. They have never been published in English.

In 2002, Lynde returned with another exclusive comic for Fantomen; Bad Bob about a hopeless Wild West criminal. This strip was published irregularly in Fantomen until 2010.

In December 2012, Lynde announced relocating to Ecuador. He quoted Charles Marion Russell in his last blog post stating of his time: Just a little sunshine, just a little rain. Just a little pleasure, just a little pain. After moving to Ecuador, Lynde fell ill but initially believed he had bronchitis. In May 2013 it was discovered to be a form of lung cancer and he moved back to Helena MT where he died at age 81 on 6 August 2013.

== Books ==
Stan Lynde and his wife Lynda founded Cottonwood Publishing in order to publish books reprinting his comics, plus publish new material, primarily Western novels.

== Novels ==
Merlin Fanshaw series

- The Bodacious Kid (1996) #1
- Careless Creek (1998) #2
- Saving Miss Julie (2004) #3
- Marshal of Medicine Lodge (2005) #4
- Summer Snow (2006) #5
- Vendetta Canyon (2008) #6
- To Kill a Copper King (2010) #7
- The Big Open (2012) #8

Stand Alone Novel

- Vigilante Moon (2003)

== Strip reprints ==
- The daily Rick O'Shay, from the beginning through 1964, was reprinted by Cottonwood Publishing in four volumes, except for one week, which was reprinted in Comics Revue magazine. Comics Revue reprinted the daily Rick O'Shay beginning with the strips from September 30, 1968. A selection of Rick O'Shay dailies, with commentary by Stan Lynde, was reprinted in Rick, Hipshot, and Me from Cottonwood Publishing.
- Grass Roots panels were reprinted in two volumes from Cottonwood Publishing.
- Latigo daily strips have all appeared in three volumes from Cottonwood Publishing. Some Sundays have been reprinted in color in Comics Revue.
