= Chicago Daily Journal =

1844–1929 daily newspaper

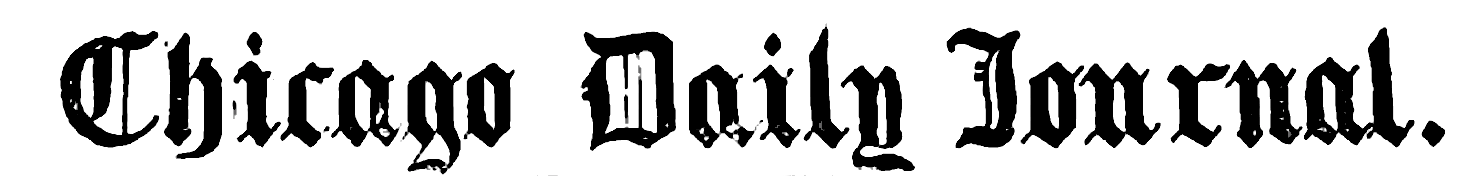

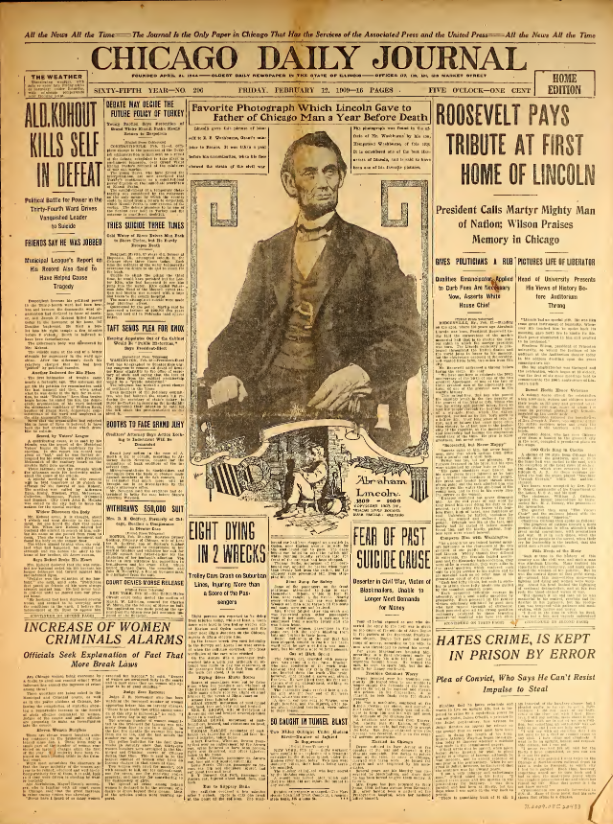
- Front page for February 12, 1909
- Format: Broadsheet
- Founded: April 22, 1844
- Ceased publication: August 21, 1929
- Political alignment: Whig (-1850s), Republican (1850s-1904); Democratic (1904-)
- Headquarters: Chicago
- Circulation: 125,000 (1925 estimate)
- OCLC number: 12352717

The Chicago Daily Journal (Chicago Evening Journal from 1861–1896) was a Chicago newspaper that published from 1844 to 1929.

== Journalism ==
Originally a Whig paper, by the late 1850s it firmly became a Republican paper, and a strong supporter of Abraham Lincoln. Editor Charles L. Wilson made the motion to nominate Lincoln as the Republican candidate for U.S. Senate for Illinois in 1858. And Wilson (with others) helped Lincoln draft his challenge to Stephen A. Douglas to conduct the Lincoln–Douglas debates.

In later years, after a 1904 sale, it became a Democratic paper.

The Journal was the first newspaper to publish the story (now believed false) that a cow owned by Catherine O'Leary was responsible for the Chicago fire in 1871.

In 1875, reporter Newton S. Grimwood died as the sole passenger in a balloon flight with noted balloonist Washington Harrison Donaldson.

When screenwriter Ben Hecht was a young reporter for the paper in the 1910s, he dug a trench in Lincoln Park for a photograph to support a hoax story that the city had suffered a great earthquake.

The Library of Congress identifies the official titles of the paper over its lifetime as: Chicago Daily Journal (1844-1853); Daily Chicago Journal (1853-1855); Chicago Daily Journal (1855-1861); Chicago Evening Journal (1861-1896); Chicago Journal (1896-1904); Chicago Daily Journal (1904-1929).

== History ==
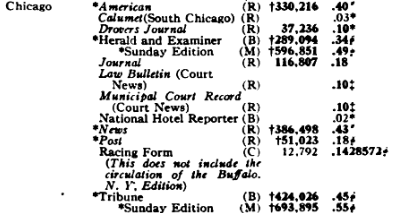
Circulation figures for Chicago newspapers appearing in Editor & Publisher in 1919. The Journal's circulation of 116,807 ranked 5th among daily papers, substantially behind the Chicago Tribune (424,026), Chicago Daily News (386,498), Chicago American (330,216), and Chicago Herald-Examiner (289,094).

In April 1844, a group of men bought the two-year-old Chicago Express. A few days later, publishing out of the former office of the Express, the Journal was first published, three years prior to the start of the Chicago Tribune.

Richard L. Wilson acquired the paper from its founding group after the 1844 election. He served as editor, with a break when President Taylor appointed him postmaster of Chicago in 1849. When Wilson died in 1856, his brother Charles L. Wilson became sole owner. When Lincoln appointed this Wilson to a diplomatic post in London in 1861, brother John L. Wilson managed the paper alone until Charles returned in 1864. Charles L. Wilson died in 1878, and Andrew Shuman (Lieutenant Governor of Illinois from 1877-1881) then became editor in chief. Shuman was associated with the paper for 33 years, starting as an assistant editor in 1856, and retiring as editor in 1888. George Martin and Slason Thompson succeeded as editors in the late 1880s and into the mid-1890s.

The newspaper advocated for higher tariffs.

James E. Scripps and his son-in-law George Gough Booth acquired the paper in 1895. George's brother Ralph also later acquired an interest, and became editor and publisher in 1900.

John C. Eastman, who had run Hearst's Chicago operations, bought the paper from the Booths in 1904. From 1904-06, the paper claimed it increased its daily circulation from 34,800 to 85,000. He left the paper to five of his employees upon his death in 1925, when it had a claimed circulation of about 125,000. Samuel Emory Thomason, a prior general manager of the Tribune, along with John Stewart Bryan of The Richmond News Leader, bought the paper in 1928 for $2,000,000. Richard J. Finnegan became managing editor of the paper in 1916.

== Demise and legacy ==
The Chicago Daily News purchased the name and circulation of the Journal in 1929, announced on August 2, which printed its last issue on August 21, 1929. But Thomason retained the Journal building and resources, and quickly launched the tabloid Daily Illustrated Times (with Finnegan continuing as managing editor). That paper (simply known as the Daily Times after 1935) was merged into the Chicago Sun in 1948 to become the Chicago Sun-Times. By way of that descent, the Sun-Times lays a claim to the 1844 lineage of the Journal.

== Other Journals ==
Subsequent Chicago publications have also used the Chicago Journal name, though without any direct relationship to the prior paper. A weekly community paper went by the name from 1977 to 1984. And another weekly Chicago Journal lasted in a print edition from 2000 to 2012.
