= Comics Revue =

- The Phantom' by Romano Felmang

Publication information
- Publisher: Manuscript Press
- Schedule: Bimonthly
- Format: Ongoing series
- Publication date: 1984 – 2024
- No. of issues: 400

Creative team
- Created by: Rick Norwood
- Editor(s): Rick Norwood; Don Markstein

Comics Revue was a bi-monthly small press comic book published by Manuscript Press and edited by Rick Norwood (from 1988 to 1991 and 1997 to 2024), and Don Markstein (from 1984 to 1987 and 1992 to 1996). It reprinted a wide array of newspaper comic strips. Editorial content largely focused on adventure but also contained humor and human interest articles.

As of 2020, it had published more than 350 issues, making it the longest running independent comic book (beating the record of Cerebus the Aardvark). It reprinted comic strips such as Alley Oop, The Amazing Spider-Man, Barnaby, Batman, Buz Sawyer, Casey Ruggles, Flash Gordon, Gasoline Alley, Hägar the Horrible, Krazy Kat, Lance, Latigo, Little Orphan Annie, Mandrake the Magician, Modesty Blaise, O'Neill, Peanuts, The Phantom, Rick O'Shay, Sir Bagby, Star Wars, Steve Canyon, Tarzan, Akwas, and Teenage Mutant Ninja Turtles.

In issue #200, Comics Revue featured the only English language publication of "The Dark Angels", the last Modesty Blaise story, by Peter O'Donnell and Romero.

In October 2009, the magazine re-launched with twice the number of pages, reprinting Sunday strips in color, and including at least one complete story. Additionally, Frew Publications colorist Ivan Pedersen and Allen Lane were hired as associate editors.

Issue #400 includes a complete index to all comic strips published in Comics Revue #1–400 prepared by Bill Slankard.
