= Invisible Scarlet O'Neil =

American comic strip

- Author: Russell Stamm
- Current status/schedule: Daily and Sunday; concluded
- Launch date: June 3, 1940
- End date: 1956
- Alternate name(s): Scarlet O'Neil (1949–1954); Stainless Steel (1954–1956)
- Syndicate(s): Chicago Times Syndicate (1940–1948); Chicago Sun-Times Syndicate (1948–1956)
- Genre: Superhero

Invisible Scarlet O'Neil is a 1940–1956 American comic strip written and drawn by Russell Stamm, who had previously been an assistant to Chester Gould on Dick Tracy. The strip focused on Scarlet O'Neil, a plainclothes superhero (and one of the first superheroines) with the power of invisibility.

== Publication history ==
Originally published by the Chicago Daily Times and distributed by its syndication service, Invisible Scarlet O'Neil began on June 3, 1940. In September 1949, the title of the strip was reduced to simply Scarlet O'Neil, and her invisibility powers were seen much more rarely.

Starting on September 13, 1954, Emery Clarke drew the strip from Stamm's scripts. The title was changed again to Stainless Steel on October 24 the same year, and the character of Scarlet was dropped. The strip ended in 1956.

== Characters and story ==
Russell Stamm's Invisible Scarlet O'Neil (May 16, 1943)

Scarlet used her power of invisibility mostly to help out strangers in need and help the police catch dangerous criminals, as explained by comics historian Don Markstein:

Scarlet got the power of invisibility from a ray her father, a scientist, was experimenting with. She curiously put just her finger in the ray, and suddenly disappeared, clothes and all. Fortunately, she discovered that a certain nerve in her left wrist could work as a toggle for the power — touching the nerve turned her invisibility on or off. This origin story was told in the first episode, in the form of a quick flashback to events years earlier, so she could get right into action. Scarlet's adventures were a little light on Nazi spies, Japanese saboteurs, master criminals and the like. In fact, they were kind of light, period. Russell Stamm, the cartoonist who created her, was a former assistant on Chester Gould's Dick Tracy, but chose a less severe approach for his own strip. The art was more rounded and "friendly" looking, and the stories less hair-raising. Instead of shooting it out with vicious killers, Scarlet's typical adventure, especially near the beginning, involved helping children in trouble. She did take on some dangerous foes, but her strip was less an action-packed comic than a send-up of them.

== In other media ==
Scarlet O'Neil also appeared in a comic book series published by Harvey Comics, as well as Big Little Books, and a 1943 prose novel. Atlantis Studios in 2007 published a one-shot comic book Untold Origins of Invisible Scarlet O'Neil on the history of the character. In 2017 Babes With Blades premiered a play by Barbara Lhota based on the strip.

== Graphic novel ==
In 2012 New Legends Productions published a graphic novel with a contemporary setting written by the son of the creator, Russell Stamm Jr., and artwork by Wendell Cavalcanti (pencils), Rob Jones and Elton Thomasi (inks).
