= Carl Grubert =

American cartoonist

Color guide for Carl Grubert's The Berrys (January 13, 1963)

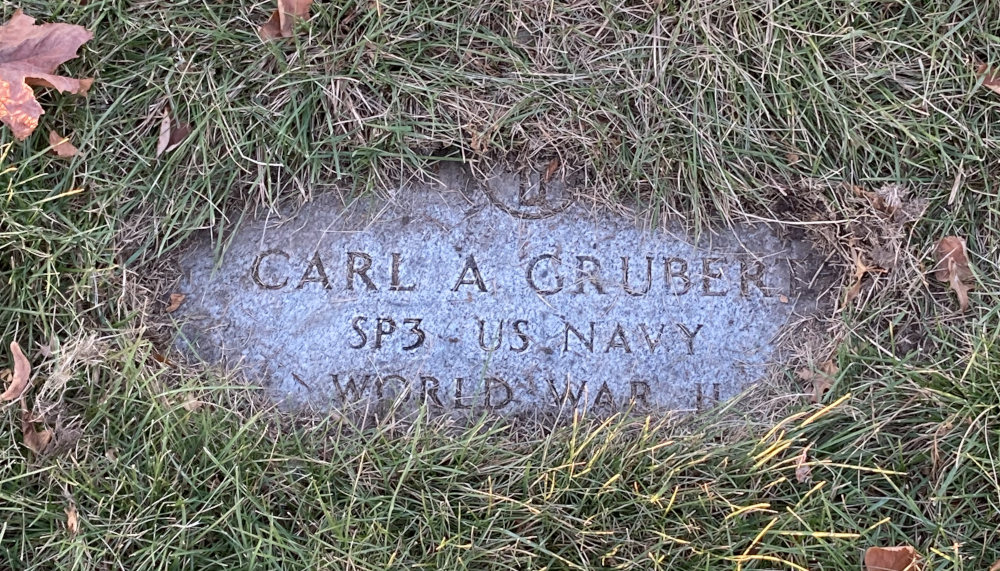
Grave of Carl Alfred Grubert

Carl Alfred Grubert, Jr. (September 11, 1911 – September 26, 1979) was an American cartoonist who drew the comic strip, The Berrys for more than three decades.

A 1934 alumnus of the University of Wisconsin–Madison, Grubert served in the United States Navy during World War II. He worked in advertising in Chicago, Illinois prior to his cartoonist career.

== Family funnies ==
Grubert's The Berrys was syndicated from 1942 to 1974, and during that long run, the strip chronicled the lives of the Berry family members–father Peter, mother Pat, daughter Jill, son Jackie and baby brother Jimmie.

Grubert died in 1979, five years after the conclusion of his strip.
