= Rita Golden Gelman =

American writer

- Born: Rita Golden; July 2, 1937 (age 87)
- Occupation: Author
- Website: www.ritagoldengelman.com

Rita Golden Gelman (born July 2, 1937) is an American writer who has written more than 70 children's books and 2 adult books.

Her organization, Let's Get Global, is dedicated to encouraging and assisting recent high school graduates to have a gap year including international experiences.

Gelman has delivered keynote speeches for several colleges and organizations.

== Early life and education ==
Gelman's family owned a small pharmacy in Bridgeport, Connecticut. As a teenager, she worked the soda fountain in the store. Her favorite part of the job was interacting with immigrant customers.

Gelman attended Beardsley Elementary School, then Warren Harding High School for her freshman year and Bassick High School for her last three years, graduating in 1954. She received a B.A. in English and American Literature from Brandeis University in 1958. In 1984, she received an M.A. in anthropology from the University of California, Los Angeles.

After graduating from college, she moved to New York City and lived in Greenwich Village until 1976, and then in Los Angeles until she began her nomadic life.

== Writing career ==
=== Children's books ===
Gelman's children's books include:

- Dumb Joey (1972), her first book, about a group of kids in New York City who had nowhere to play
- Body Noises (1983) about noises made by the body including yawns, sneezes, cracking joints and flatulence
- Rice is Life (2000) about how rice is grown and harvested on the island of Bali
- More Spaghetti, I Say! (1993) about Minnie, a monkey who can't stop eating spaghetti
- Body Battles (1992) about how our bodies fight off viruses and other threats to our health, such as drugs and poisons

=== Adult books ===
Her memoir, Tales of a Female Nomad, Living at Large in the World, was published in 2001 by Crown Publishing Group/Random House. In the book, she writes about the first 15 years of living in developing countries after selling all of her possessions. In October 2014, it reached 4th in the "Love and Relationships" category of The New York Times Best Seller list.

In June 2010, she wrote Female Nomad and Friends, Breaking Free and Breaking Bread Around the World in which 41 authors, all but two of them women, tell their stories of "connecting across cultures." Gelman has eight stories in the book. There are also 33 international recipes. All the author royalties from this anthology are used to send high school graduates from slums in New Delhi to vocational schools via scholarships organized by Rotary International.

== Personal life ==
In 1960, she married Stephen Gelman. Her son, Mitch, was born in 1962 and her daughter, Jan, was born in 1963. She divorced around 1986.

In 1987, Gelman sold all her possessions and become a citizen of the world. She has never returned to a settled life; on her website she refers to herself as a "modern day nomad", although she temporarily lives in New York City.
