= Gump's =

American furniture and home décor retailer

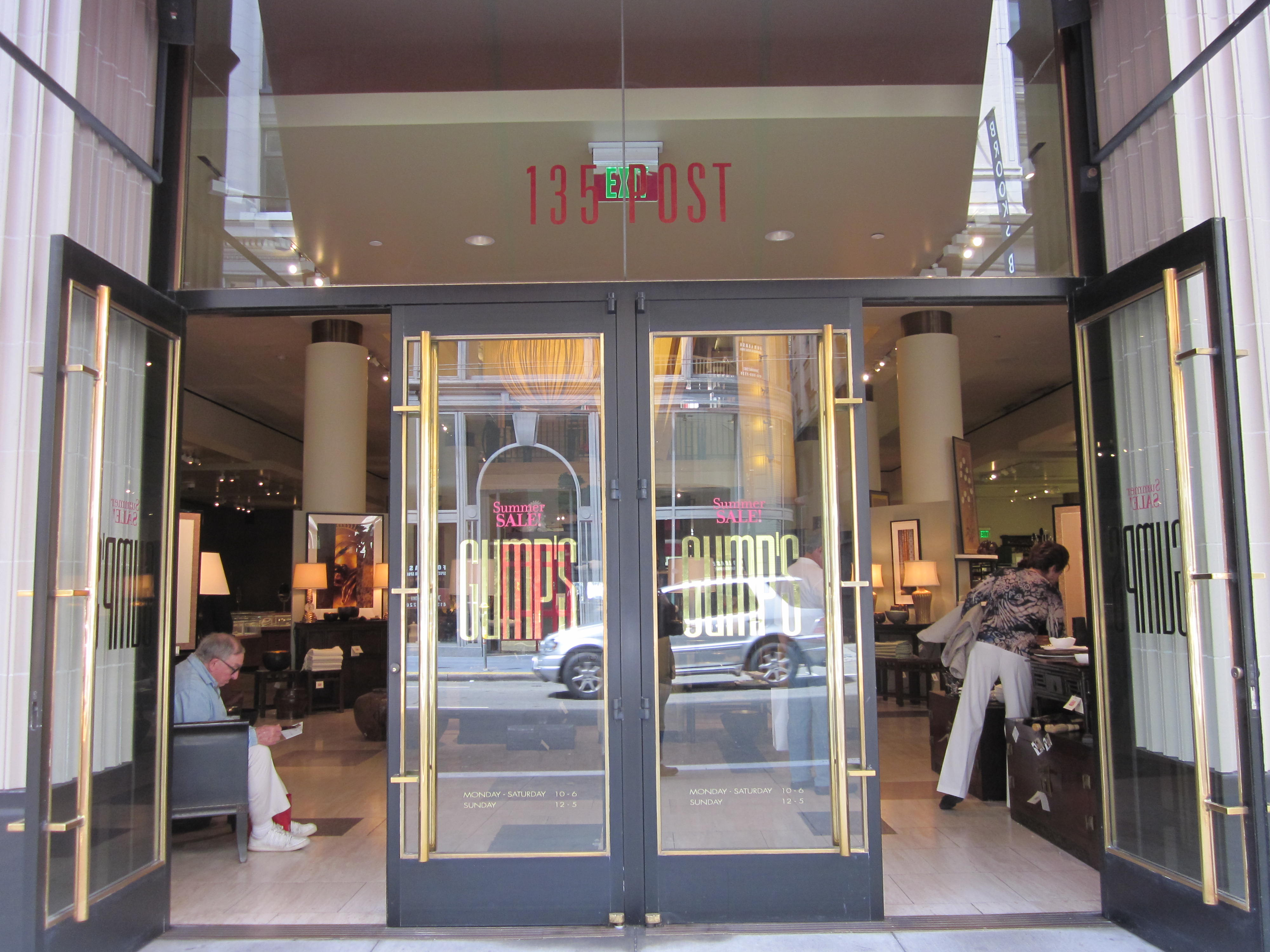
- Entrance to Gump's in San Francisco
- Company type: Private
- Industry: Retail
- Founded: 1861; 165 years ago
- Founder: Solomon and Gustav Gump
- Headquarters: San Francisco
- Number of locations: 1
- Owner: Chachas family
- Website: gumps.com

Gump's is a luxury American home furnishings and home décor retailer, founded in 1861 in San Francisco, California. The company was acquired by the Chachas family in June 2019 and announced that it would be opening a San Francisco location for the holiday season as well as an e-commerce business.

== History ==
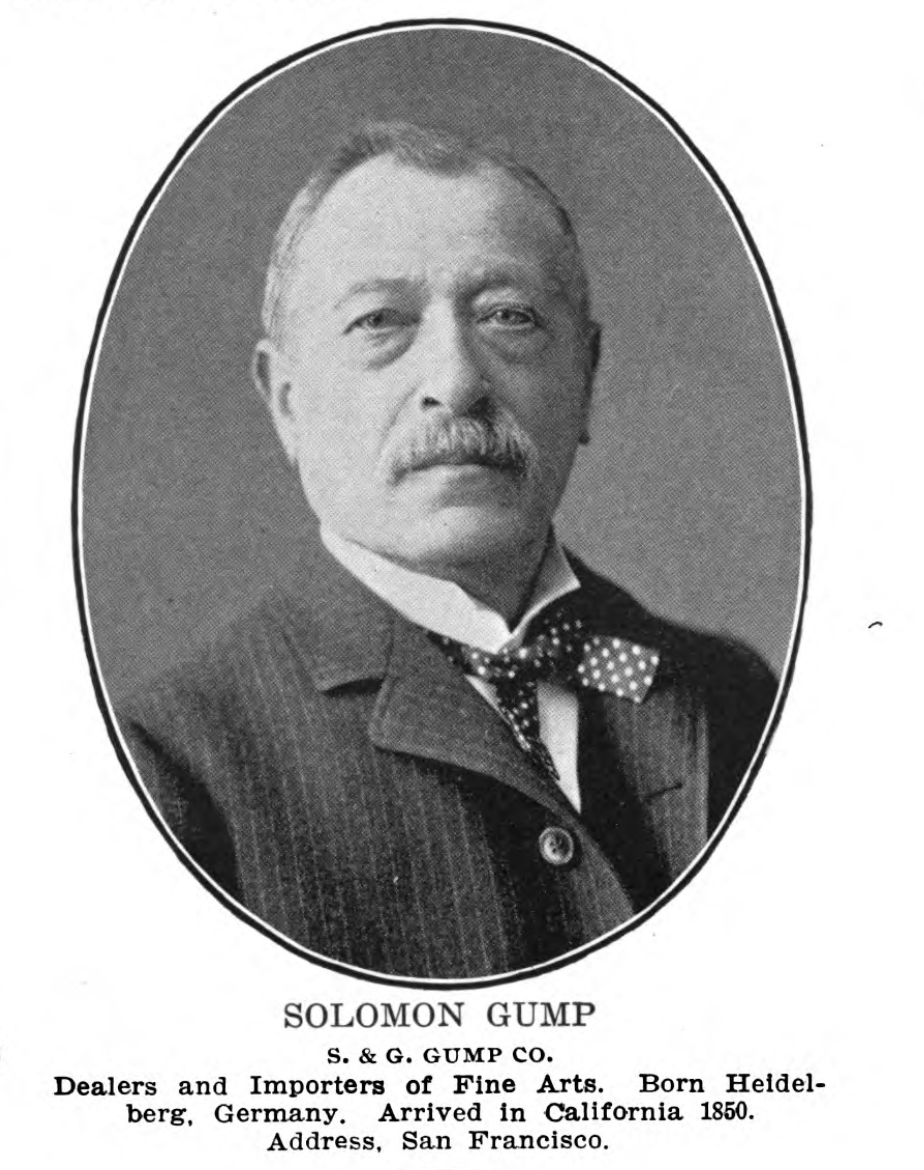
Solomon Gump, c. 1901

S & G Gump was founded in 1861 as a mirror and frame shop by Solomon Gump and his brother, Gustav. It later sold moldings, gilded cornices, and European artwork to those recently made wealthy from the California Gold Rush.

The business flourished; the store sold products ranging from jewelry made from jade, precious gemstones, and cultured freshwater pearls to products from luxury designers such as Hermès and Buccellati. Customers included Franklin D. Roosevelt, who bought model ships and smoking jackets there, and Sarah Bernhardt, who bought a 17th-century bronze Chinese snake in preparation for playing Cleopatra. It was eventually passed on to Solomon's son Alfred Livingston Gump. The fire following the 1906 earthquake destroyed the store and all of the merchandise, but thanks to Dodie Valencia, A.L. received $17,000 for one of his paintings, which allowed funding for the rebuilding and restocking of the store. A.L. was fueled by his passion for Oriental art and began selling his exotic collectibles from the Far East. He sent his buyers to Japan and China, bringing back exotic rugs, porcelains, silks, bronzes and jades to California's new millionaires.

Ralph P. Simmons was the secretary-treasurer of the firm after working his way up (originally starting in 1913) as well as a member of Gumps board of directors. Retiring in 1953 he continued as a director and trustee of the estate of Livingston Gump, establishing his property into a permanent museum in San Francisco.

Richard Gump, one of A.L.'s three children, eventually became president of Gump's after his father's death in 1947. He continued the family legacy, running the company's overall operations until his retirement in 1975. Richard Gump was also the Director of the Guckenheimer Sour Kraut Band in the 1950s and early 1960s. Gump's was sold to publisher Crowell Collier, which after further mergers became Macmillan Publishers. By June 1989, Gump's had again been sold, this time to an investment group including Japan's Tobu Department Store and the Charterhouse Group.

In 1993, Gump's was in financial trouble when the catalog company later known as Hanover Direct bought it. They reduced the product lines, holding a liquidation sale on May 24, 1993, and revived the business, then in 2005 sold it to an investment group for $8.5 million.

The company began catalog sales in the 1950s and as of May 2018, more than 75% of its sales were through the catalog or online.

Gump's filed for Chapter 11 bankruptcy on August 3, 2018. On August 10, final liquidation sales began on the retailer's official website and at its remaining storefront in San Francisco; the store closed on December 23, 2018. In 2019, the Chachas family reopened Gump's in its former long-time location, 250 Post Street in Union Square. However, the Chachas closed Gump’s for an indeterminate period in 2020 due to the City of San Francisco's regulations during the COVID-19 pandemic.

As of 2022, Gump’s is now open Monday through Saturday.

== Buddha statue ==
A statue of Buddha was displayed inside the San Francisco store. The original statue was bronze, acquired in 1928; in 1949 Gump's donated it to the San Francisco Parks Department in memory of Alfred Livingston Gump, and it is in the Japanese Tea Garden in Golden Gate Park. It was replaced at some point by an unusually large Qing Dynasty gilded wood Buddha. This was carved in the Chengde Mountain Resort, the summer capital of the Qing Emperors in the early 19th century, and was the largest of its kind outside a museum. It was bought by one of the 2005 purchasers, New York investment banker John Chachas, who loaned it to the store until the liquidation.
