= Grin and Bear It =

1932-2015 newspaper comic strip

- For his Sunday feature, George Lichty often grouped four cartoons in this layout design of two horizontal cartoons between a circle and a vertical. (August 2, 1953)
- Author(s): George Lichty (1932–c. 1974); Arthur Erenberg (1939–1974); Ralph Dunagin (c. 1974–2015)
- Illustrator(s): George Lichty (1932–c. 1974); Rick Yager (c. 1963–1992); Fred Wagner (1992–2015)
- Current status/schedule: Daily and Sunday; concluded
- Launch date: March 1932
- End date: May 3, 2015
- Syndicate(s): Chicago Times Syndicate (c. 1935–1938); United Feature Syndicate (1938–1941); Field Enterprises (1941–1947); Sun and Times Company (1947–1948); Publishers Syndicate (1948–1967); Publishers-Hall Syndicate (1967–1975); Field Enterprises (1975–1984); News America Syndicate (1984–1986); North America Syndicate (1986–2015)
- Publisher(s): McGraw-Hill; Pocket Books; Public Affairs Press
- Genre(s): Humor, Politics

Grin and Bear It is a former daily comic panel created by George Lichtenstein under the pen name George Lichty. Lichty created Grin and Bear it in 1932 and it ran 83 years until 2015, making it the 10th-longest-running comic strip in American history. Frequent subjects included computers, excessive capitalism and Soviet bureaucracy. Situations in his cartoons often took place in the offices of commissars, or the showrooms of "Belchfire" dealers with enormous cars in the background. His series "Is Party Line, Comrade!" skewered Soviet bureaucrats, always wearing a five-pointed star medal with the label "Hero".

For his Sunday feature, George Lichty sometimes grouped four cartoons into a layout of two horizontal cartoons between a circular panel and a vertical panel. A similar approach was used by Fred Neher with the layout of gag cartoons on his Sunday Life’s Like That.

Lichty's cartoon style had a strong influence on the cartoons drawn by Joe Teller, father of Teller (of Penn & Teller fame), as evidenced in Teller's book "When I'm Dead All This Will Be Yours!": Joe Teller—A Portrait by His Kid (2000).

== Publication history ==
Launched in 1932, the strip was first distributed by Chicago Times Syndicate before moving to United Feature Syndicate, and then to the Field Newspaper Syndicate beginning in 1941. Field Enterprises was sold in 1984 to Rupert Murdoch's News Corporation, which then in turn was sold in 1986 to King Features Syndicate, which distributed the feature until its last episode on May 3, 2015.

Lichty worked on the panel until 1974. Journalist Arthur Erenberg most likely wrote the gags from 1939 to 1974. After Lichty and Erenberg left the panel, cartoonists who worked on it included Fred Wagner, Rick Yager and Ralph Dunagin. It received the National Cartoonists Society's Newspaper Panel Cartoon Award for 1956, 1960, 1962 and 1964. At the end of its run, it was drawn "by Fred Wagner and written by Ralph Dunagin". The last Saturday episode ran on May 2, 2015, and the last Sunday on May 3.

== Books ==
Lichty's cartoons were collected in three books, Grin and Bear It (McGraw-Hill, 1956), the paperback Grin and Bear It (Pocket Books, 1970) and Is Party Line, Comrade (Public Affairs Press, 1965).

== Sources ==
- Strickler, Dave. Syndicated Comic Strips and Artists, 1924-1995: The Complete Index. Cambria, California: Comics Access, 1995. ISBN 0-9700077-0-1
