= Jack Kent (illustrator) =

American comics artist

- Born: John Wellington Kent; March 10, 1920 Burlington, Iowa, U.S.
- Died: October 18, 1985 (aged 65) U.S.
- Areas: Cartoonist, Artist
- Notable works: King Aroo
- Spouse: June

Jack Kent's King Aroo (November 25, 1956)

John Wellington Kent (March 10, 1920 – October 18, 1985), better known by his signature Jack Kent, was an American cartoonist and prolific author-illustrator of 40 children's books. He is perhaps best known as the creator of King Aroo, a comic strip often compared to Walt Kelly's Pogo. In addition to his own books, he also illustrated 22 books by other authors.

Born in Burlington, Iowa, Kent dropped out of high school at the age of 15 and began a career as a freelance commercial artist, working in that field until he joined the U.S. Army in 1941.

== King Aroo arrives ==
His first nationally recognized work was King Aroo, which was syndicated and distributed internationally from November 1950 to June 1965. The strip did not become a great commercial success, but was reportedly adored by its loyal fanbase, and praised for its imaginative puns and dialogue. The early strips were collected in a 192-page book, King Aroo, published as a trade paperback by Doubleday in 1953. The collection had an introduction by Gilbert Seldes. In 2010 IDW began a complete reprint of King Aroo, with the first volume covering dailies and Sundays from 1950 thru 1952.

He also wrote and drew the seasonal 1968 syndicated Christmas comic strip, Why Christmas Almost Wasn't which was also offered to Newspaper Enterprise Association (NEA) clients.

Also in 1968, and continuing into 1969, he wrote several articles (and illustrated one of them) for Mad. He made a final contribution to Mad in 1977.

He began writing and illustrating children's books in 1968, which he continued doing until his death.

== Personal life ==
According to Bruce Canwell's biographical essay published in IDW's second volume of King Aroo-reprints, Kent married Juliet Bridgman in September 1952; however, the couple divorced only eight months later. In March 1954, Kent married again, this time to June Kilstofte, a reporter who had interviewed him for a magazine article. They remained married until Kent's death. In July, 1955 their only child John Wellington "Jack" Kent Jr. was born.

Living on the banks of the San Antonio River, Kent and his wife June named their home King Aroo's Castle. He died in 1985 from leukemia.

== Awards ==
Jack Kent's book Just Only John received awards from the Chicago Graphics Associates and the Children's Book Clinic. The New York Times named his Mr. Meebles outstanding picture book of the year 1970.

== Archives ==
At the University of Minnesota, the collection Jack Kent Papers spans the years 1953 to 1985 and includes 50 pencil sketches, nine photocopies, 182 blue line illustrations, 251 ink illustrations (some with holograph, paste-ups, separations), two paste-ups for table of contents, eight pencil illustrations with holograph, three ink illustrations with color indications and three watercolor illustrations.

== Selected works ==
- 1987 Jack Kent's Valentine Sticker Book ISBN 0-590-32400-4
- 1985 The Caterpillar and the Polliwog
- 1985 Joey Runs Away ISBN 0-13-510462-9
- 1984 Joey
- 1984 Jim Jimmy James ISBN 0-688-02541-2
- 1984 Round Robin
- 1983 Silly Goose
- 1982 The Once-Upon-a-Time Dragon
- 1981 Jack Kent's Sticker-Fun Drawing Book ISBN 0-590-32312-1
- 1981 Little Peep
- 1981 The Biggest Shadow in the Zoo ISBN 0-8193-1048-4
- 1981 The Scribble Monster ISBN 0-15-271031-0
- 1980 Knee High Nina
- 1979 Floyd, the Tinniest Elephant ISBN 0-385-14099-1
- 1979 Hoddy Doddy (collecting three stories: "The Lobsters", "The Clock", and "The Patriot")
- 1979 Jack Kent's Hokus Pokus Bedtime Book
- 1978 Socks For Supper
- 1978 Jack Kent's Cindy Lou and the Witch's Dog
- 1978 Piggy Bank Gonzales
- 1978 Supermarket Magic: A Sniffy Book (a scratch and sniff book) ISBN 0-394-83921-8
- 1977 Jack Kent's Merry Mother Goose
- 1976 The Animobile Book
- 1976 There's No Such Thing as a Dragon
- 1976 Jack Kent's Happy-Ever-After Book
- 1975 The Christmas Piñata
- 1975 The Egg Book ISBN 0-02-750200-7
- 1974 Bremen Town Musicians
- 1974 More Fables of Aesop
- 1974 Jack Kent's Hop, Skip, and Jump Book: An Action Word Book
- 1973 Mrs. Mooley
- 1973 Jack Kent's 12 Days of Christmas
- 1972 Jack Kent's Fables of Aesop (aka The Fox and the Crow: And 10 Other Tales)
- 1972 Dooley and the Snortsnoot
- 1971 The Fat Cat: A Danish Folktale
- 1971 The Wizard of Wallaby Wallow (aka The Wizard and His Magic Spells) ISBN 0-819305-13-8
- 1970 The Blah
- 1970 Mr. Meebles
- 1970 Jack Kent's Book of Nursery Tales
- 1969 Mrs. Mooley
- 1969 Mr. Elephant's Birthday Party
- 1969 Clotilda (aka Clotilda's Magic) ISBN 0-394-83866-1
- 1969 Fly Away Home
- 1969 The Grown-Up Day
- 1968 Just Only John
- 1953 King Aroo (Doubleday)

=== Other authors ===
Jack Kent illustrations for other authors

- 1985 The Twiddle Twins' Haunted House by Howard Goldsmith
- 1985 Q Is for Duck: An Alphabet Guessing Game by Marcia McClintock Folsom and Mary Elting
- 1985 Easy As Pie: A Guessing Game of Sayings by Marcia Folsom and Michael Folsom
- 1984 Grime Doesn't Pay: Law & Order Jokes compiled by Charles Keller
- 1980 Big Bear, Spare That Tree by Richard J. Margolis ISBN 0-688-80248-6
- 1979 Laura's Story by Beatrice Schenk de Regniers ISBN 0-689-30677-6
- 1978 Janie and the Giant by Sarah Barchas
- 1978 The Simple Prince by Jane Yolen ISBN 0-8193-0960-5
- 1977 More Spaghetti, I Say! by Rita Golden Gelman (later printings after 1987 are illustrated by Mort Gerberg instead of Jack Kent)
- 1976 The Magic Carrot Seeds by Carla Stevens
- 1976 Seven at One Blow by Freya Littledale
- 1976 Why Can't I Fly by Rita Golden Gelman
- 1975 I Was Walking Down the Road by Sarah E. Barchas
- 1975 How to Make Possum's Honey Bread, Skunk's Chocolate Sprinkle Bread, and Racoon's Raisin Bread, Too by Carla Stevens ISBN 0-8164-3166-3

==== Ralph series ====
The Ralph series about a parrot named Ralph. Written by Bonnie Bishop:

- 1979 No One Noticed Ralph
- 1979 Ralph Rides Away

==== Ruth Belov Gross ====
Jack Kent illustrated books by Ruth Belov Gross

- 1983 The Girl Who Wouldn't Get Married
- 1982 If You Grew Up with George Washington (later printings are illustrated by Emily Arnold McCully instead of Jack Kent)
- 1977 The Emperor's New Clothes retold by Ruth Belov Gross
- 1974 The Bremen-town Musicians retold by Ruth Belov Gross
