= King Aroo =

American comic strip

- Author: Jack Kent
- Current status/schedule: Concluded
- Launch date: November 13, 1950
- End date: June 19, 1965
- Syndicate: McClure Newspaper Syndicate
- Genre: Humor

King Aroo is an American comic strip written and drawn by Jack Kent, which made its debut on November 13, 1950 and ran until June 19, 1965. The strip was distributed through the McClure Syndicate.

== Characters and story ==
The strip's central character, King Aroo, is the monarch of the mythical Myopia. Supporting characters included Yupyop, Lord High Almost Everything; scientific expert Professor Yorgle; Mr. Pennipost, the kangaroo mailman with an astounding pocket capacity; Mr. Elephant, so forgetful he doesn't recall himself; nosy court poet Dipody Distich, Drexel the dragon and Wanda Witch, a bird who pushes a cart marked with "Spells and Curses, 5¢" signage.

Kent's strip abounded in sophisticated puns and wordplay, alongside surreal comedy. The strip was described in The Smithsonian Collection of Newspaper Comics:

King Aroo is celebrated largely among devotees of comics, and appealing to the members of the readership that loved Krazy Kat, Barnaby, Pogo and Little Nemo. The King was the creation of Jack Kent, born in Burlington, Iowa, in 1920. It was probably Kent's lack of formal art training that led to a loose-lined art style, with panels full of characters and activity. It was surely his innate artistic ability that kept those panels from looking cluttered. The strip began in 1950 in national syndication but was discontinued after a few years. It was kept on in limited syndication until 1965 by Stanleigh Arnold's small Golden Gate Features.

Kent and his wife June Kent named their home on the banks of the San Antonio River "King Aroo's Castle."

== Collections and reprints ==
Jack Kent's King Aroo (November 24, 1960).

The early strips were collected in a 192-page book, King Aroo, published by Doubleday in 1953. The collection had an introduction by Gilbert Seldes.

In April 2010, IDW Publishing and The Library of American Comics released the first volume of an intended complete reprint of King Aroo, with the first volume covering dailies and Sundays from 1950 through 1952. The series is edited and designed by Dean Mullaney with biographical text by Bruce Canwell and an introduction by Sergio Aragones. IDW had difficulty locating certain strips, causing the next volume to be delayed; however, by March 2013 the strips of 1953–54 were also available in book form.
