= Rick O'Shay =

1958–1981 American comic strip

- Author: Stan Lynde
- Current status/schedule: Ended
- Launch date: Sunday: April 27, 1958 daily: May 19, 1958
- End date: March 8, 1981
- Syndicate: Chicago Tribune Syndicate
- Genre: Western

Rick O'Shay is a Western comic strip created by Stan Lynde, which debuted as a Sunday strip on April 27, 1958. The daily comic strip began on May 19 of the same year. It was distributed worldwide through the Chicago Tribune Syndicate. The final Rick O'Shay comic strips written and drawn by Lynde were the daily for 7 May 1977 and the Sunday for July 17, 1977. He left the syndicate after a disagreement. As the syndicate owned the rights to the strip, the popular Rick O'Shay comic strip was continued by others: Marian Dern (writer) and Alfredo Alcala and Mel Keefer (artists). Publication ended on March 8, 1981.

== Characters and story ==
The strip is set in the Western town of Conniption, where Rick O'Shay is the marshal. His best friend is gunslinger Hipshot Percussion. Other key characters include gambler Deuces Wilde, dance-hall owner Gaye Abandon, physician Dr. Basil Metabolism (and his nurse, Ophelia Pulse), deputy Manuel Labor, gunsmith and Civil War veteran Cap'n Ball, banker Mort Gage, barber Dan Druff, cafe owner Hominy Grits, preacher Jubal Lee, and a boy named Quyat Burp. The neighboring Kyute Indian tribe includes Chief Horse's Neck, his ugly but sweet daughter Moonglow, and her persistent suitor Crazy Quilt.

Until the official announcement in the September 29, 1969 strip that it would be set in the late 19th century from that time forward, the strip was taking place in the present day but pretending it was about the Old West with anachronisms.

== Books ==
Lynde and his wife formed Cottonwood Publishing, which later acquired the rights to Rick O'Shay. The company has published reprints, posters, collectibles, and a new two-part comic-book story, The Price of Fame (1992), featuring Rick and Hipshot. They reprinted all of the dailies from the beginning through 1964, except for one week in December 1963. They also published A Month of Sundays, reprinting 60 Sunday strips from the 1970s, 32 of which are in color. Further plans for reprints were put on hold after some of the original artwork was destroyed in a fire.

The Menomonee Falls Gazette reprinted dailies from September 24, 1973, to March 13, 1976. Comics Revue magazine reprinted strips from the week missing in the Cottonwood books in issue #231, and is reprinting all of the dailies, starting where Cottonwood Publishing left off, in issues #227. They have published all of the Stan Lynde dailies, and are currently publishing the Sundays.

== Style ==
The backgrounds were realistically drawn; the characters were originally cartoonish, but became more realistic over the years. Surreal themes are mixed in (such as the pun-laden names). By the late 1960s, elements of adventure, philosophy, morality, and tragedy—such as Hipshot teetering on the brink of death following a gunfight—were added to the storyline.

Hipshot is frequently referred to as an "outlaw", and in one strip, he decided to regain his losses at poker by holding up the local bank. Sometimes in the Sunday strip, he is shown alone, on horseback, in the Western background, speaking to his Maker, whom he addresses as "Boss". He does not attend church and prefers to recognize his God in a privately styled fashion.
