= What a Guy! =

American comic strip by Bill and Bunny Hoest

- Bill Hoest's What a Guy! (1987)
- Author(s): Bill Hoest (1987–88); Bunny Hoest (1988–96)
- Illustrator(s): John Reiner
- Current status/schedule: Discontinued
- Launch date: March 29, 1987
- End date: 1996
- Syndicate(s): King Features Syndicate
- Genre(s): Humor

What a Guy! is an American comic strip created by Bill Hoest and Bunny Hoest, the team responsible for The Lockhorns and Agatha Crumm. It began in March 1987, just over a year before Hoest's death in 1988.

The What a Guy! daily strip was a single-panel gag cartoon which was also formatted as a rectangular comic strip. The Sunday strip grouped together an assortment of three different cartoons with no connecting theme or continuity. Distributed by King Features Syndicate, the strip was continued by Hoest's widow, Bunny Hoest and Bill's assistant, John Reiner, until they decided to end it in 1996.

== Characters and story ==
What a Guy! was created when Bill and Bunny were visiting with Bunny's daughter and her family. Bunny's grandson was an early "latchkey" child. Bill and Bunny were amazed at his very "grown-up" comments and used him as the prototype for Guy Wellington Frothmore, who became the focus of a comic strip. What a Guy! cartoons featured a young boy who "questions life's complexities" and repeats adult concepts overheard from his yuppie parents. The strip was launched into print syndication across the United States and Canada by King Features on March 29, 1987. The strip, like many non-topical gag strips, was mailed to the syndicate in batches of four weeks worth of comics at one time, several months ahead of the expected publication date.

Strip historian Allan Holtz described the character:

The premise is that an elementary school kid named Guy is obsessed with the idea that he's a businessman. He wears a frumpy suit, has a middle-age paunch, worries about ulcers, the whole nine yards. The idea was timely in the go-go 1980s, but Hoest didn't get there first -- the Guy character is strongly reminiscent of Alex P. Keaton from the hit TV sitcom Family Ties. The popularity of the TV show was probably seen as an asset, but it didn't seem to have the desired slingshot effect to propel What a Guy! into newspapers. The feature at first used the tried-and-true model of The Lockhorns for the Sunday page -- a group of panel cartoons that could be rejiggered into many different formats. For unknown reasons this format was dropped in 1988 and the Sunday became a strip feature. From the beginning the daily was in strip form instead of a panel, though the 'strip' was almost always a single panel.

Bill Hoest's What a Guy! (October 1, 1987)

Bill Hoest died on November 8, 1988, from complications of lymphoma at New York University Medical Center. His widow, Bunny Hoest, announced that What a Guy! and the other Hoest strips would continue "in perpetuity" with Bunny Hoest as writer and drawing on the "large amount of work" Bill had prepared before his death. Bill Hoest's "cartooning assistant," John Reiner, told Newsday, "Hoest left up to two years' material in various stages of completion in his files." Reiner, who had already taken over drawing duties, would continue to draw What A Guy! and the five other Hoest comics then in production. (The other five were the syndicated The Lockhorns and Agatha Crumm; Laugh Parade and Howard Huge for Parade magazine; plus Bumper Snickers for The National Enquirer.) This arrangement lasted until the strip ended in 1996.

What a Guy! was one of the comics featured on Morning Funnies cereal boxes in 1988 and 1989, and the strips were collected in What a Guy! What's the Latest? (Tor, 1990).

== Reception ==
Reader reaction to the strip was widely varied. One person wrote in The Philadelphia Inquirer that What a Guy! was one of the "worst comics around" while a couple wrote to the Pittsburgh Post-Gazette to deride the strip as "merely insipid" and that it "warrants no more space than Trudy or Marmaduke". A Lakeland Ledger reader commented, after the paper dropped What a Guy! in favor of Calvin and Hobbes, that What a Guy! was "one of the best and funniest comic strips" the paper printed.
