= Milquetoast =

Caspar Milquetoast was a popular American cartoon character created by Harold Tucker Webster. The term "milquetoast" has since come to be used to describe a meek or timid person.

Milquetoast may also refer to:

- Dr. Milquetoast, a character in "The Pacifist", by Arthur C. Clarke
- "Milquetoast" (song), 1994, from Helmet's album Betty
- Milquetoast the Cockroach, one of the minor characters in Bloom County
- Milquetoast, a class available in the video game Bloodborne

== See also ==
- Milk toast, a dish consisting of buttered toast in milk
