= Poor Arnold's Almanac =

American comic strip by Arnold Roth

- Author: Arnold Roth
- Current status/schedule: Sunday (1959–1961); daily & Sunday (1989–1990); concluded
- Launch date: May 31, 1959
- End date: 1990
- Syndicate(s): New York Herald Tribune Syndicate (1959–1961); Creators Syndicate (1989-1990)
- Genre(s): humor, adults

Poor Arnold's Alamanac was a newspaper comic strip by Arnold Roth. Each installment covered a single subject, with Roth devising gags on such topics as baseball, dogs, commuting, elephants, ice cream, smoking and the telephone.

Roth wrote and drew Poor Arnold's Almanac from May 31, 1959, to May 14, 1961 and again from 1989 to 1990. Roth initially created a color Sunday comic strip for the New York Herald Tribune Syndicate, and nearly three decades later, it was revived for the Creators Syndicate as both a daily and a Sunday feature. Roth recalled:

I think the only other times I've gotten a regular check for doing work was when I had a syndicated feature with the Herald Tribune. And then a revival of that 30 years later. That was Poor Arnold's Almanac. ... They had a very good comics editor. It was almost completely a writer's syndicate. They had a few comics and the newer ones were B.C. by Johnny Hart and Mell Lazarus' Miss Peach, which was very good also. It was sort of like Peanuts in a way, with bright little kids saying sophisticated things. But they had a few old-time things that they kept alive. I think one was called Mr. And Mrs. I can't rattle them off. So Al sold them Tall Tales, and I sold them Poor Arnold's Almanac, which ran two years.
It was a Sunday only, which was why they canceled me. They wanted a daily. They said it makes the Sunday feature stronger. The Sunday feature was doing—not great, but well enough for me to make money. At that time I was living in England, and my magazine work and record album work was starting. I wasn't in great haste to do a daily. But during one of my many moves, when I came back, I found that I had penciled a stack of dailies, but I was never going to ink them. I didn't want to get too locked up in the syndicate thing.

== Books ==
John Updike did the introduction when Fantagraphics Books published a book of Roth's strip in 1998. Updike later reprinted that essay in his collection Due Considerations (2007). "All cartoonists are geniuses, but Arnold Roth is especially so," wrote Updike in his introduction.
