= Morning Funnies =

Breakfast cereal

- A box of Morning Funnies (3rd edition)

Fruit-flavored cereal
- Mascot: Dennis the Menace and assorted comic strip characters
- Introduced: 1988/1989
- Availability: Discontinued (1989)

Morning Funnies
Nutritional value per 1 cup (28 g)
- Energy: 110 kcal (460 kJ)
- Carbohydrates: 25
- Sugars: 14
- Dietary fiber: 0
- Fat: 1
- Saturated: 0
- Trans: 0
- Protein: 1
Vitamins and minerals
Vitamins	Quantity %DV^{†}
Vitamin A equiv.	0% 0 μg
Vitamin C	0% 0 mg
Minerals	Quantity %DV^{†}
Calcium	0% 0 mg
Iron	139% 25 mg
Potassium	1% 23 mg
Sodium	3% 70 mg
- Other constituents: Quantity
- Cholesterol: 0
- ^{†}Percentages estimated using US recommendations for adults, except for potassium, which is estimated based on expert recommendation from the National Academies.

Morning Funnies was a fruit-flavored breakfast cereal produced by Ralston Cereals in 1988 and 1989. The name of the cereal was based on the assortment of newspaper comic strips featured on the box. Innovative packaging allowed the back flap of the box to be opened revealing additional comic strips, different on each edition of the cereal box. Poor sales and negative consumer reaction led to the cereal being discontinued in 1989.

Morning Funnies was just one of several Ralston cereals based on licensed characters introduced in 1988 and 1989. Others included Teenage Mutant Ninja Turtles Cereal, Breakfast With Barbie, the video-game themed Nintendo Cereal System, and a Batman cereal based on the 1989 film.

== Appearance ==
The cereal, made with four grains and heavily sweetened, was brightly colored and shaped like smiling faces but not any specific comic strip character.

The front cover of each 14-ounce box featured an assortment of popular newspaper comic strip characters in colorful squares arranged to resemble panels in "the funnies" (a shortening of "the funny papers", a colloquial term for the comics pages in newspapers). Each front cover also prominently displayed which of nine numbered "collector's edition" cereal boxes it was. The comic strips displayed were unique to each edition of the box.

The back of the box featured a pair of large Sunday comics-style comic strips and instructions on how to open the back flap to reveal more comics. The entire back of the box opened to reveal a "fifth panel" with six more color comics inside for a total of eight strips per box. This flap structure was described as "an original packaging concept" for breakfast cereal. In 1988, Ralston won an award for "innovative packaging" for the Morning Funnies fifth panel design.

Most of the comics characters and strips on Morning Funnies were reproduced under license from the King Features Syndicate. The comic strips in the rotation included Dennis the Menace by Hank Ketcham, Beetle Bailey by Mort Walker, Hägar the Horrible by Dik Browne, Hi and Lois by Walker and Browne, The Family Circus by Bil Keane, Tiger by Bud Blake, Luann by Greg Evans, Marvin by Tom Armstrong, Funky Winkerbean by Tom Batiuk, and What a Guy! by Bill Hoest and John Reiner.

Some editions of the box also included a subscription offer for Young American, described as "America's newspaper for kids".

== Reception ==
A consumer panel for the Wilmington Morning Star found Morning Funnies to be "overly sweet" with a "strong sweet smell" but noted the cereal's large size made it "a great snack eaten dry". The panel moderator opined, "if you prefer good taste to gimmicks, you might want to stay away from this technicolor treat."

A survey of children's breakfast cereals published in May 1991 by Vegetarian Times found Morning Funnies to be one of the "10 worst kids' cereals, based on sugar content" with its 14 grams per serving ranking only behind Kellogg's Honey Smacks on the list.

While the packaging for the cereal was innovative, the comics themselves did not all appeal to the very young children to whom the cereal was marketed. Also, with only nine box variations in the year or so the cereal was produced, frequent buyers of Morning Funnies would see the same comic strips over and over.

== See also ==
- List of breakfast cereals
