= New York Herald Tribune Syndicate =

Print syndication service

- Formerly: New York Herald Syndicate
- Company type: Subsidiary
- Industry: Print syndication
- Founded: c. 1914; 111 years ago
- Defunct: 1966; 59 years ago
- Fate: Merged into Publishers Syndicate
- Headquarters: 230 West 41st Street, New York, New York, U.S.
- Key people: Harry Staton
- Products: Comic strips, newspaper columns
- Owners: Reid Family (1924–1958); John Hay Whitney (1958–1966)

The New York Herald Tribune Syndicate was the syndication service of the New York Herald Tribune. Syndicating comic strips and newspaper columns, it operated from c. 1914 to 1966. The syndicate's most notable strips were Mr. and Mrs., Our Bill, Penny, Miss Peach, and B.C. Syndicated columns included Walter Lippmann's Today and Tomorrow (c. 1933–1967), Weare Holbrook's Soundings, George Fielding Eliot's military affairs column, and John Crosby's radio and television column. Irita Bradford Van Doren was book review editor for a time.

== History ==
The syndicate dates back to at least 1914, when it was part of the New York Tribune. (The Tribune acquired the New York Herald in 1924 to form the New York Herald Tribune.)

The syndicate's first comic strip of note was Clare Briggs' Mr. and Mrs., which debuted in 1919. Harry Staton became the editor and manager of the syndicate in 1920; other notable strips which launched in the 1920s included Harrison Cady's Peter Rabbit, Charles A. Voight's Betty (which had originated with the McClure Syndicate), Crawford Young's Clarence, and H. T. Webster's The Timid Soul (which had originated with the New York World). All of those strips had long syndication runs of at least 25 years.

Strips launched by the Herald Tribune Syndicate in the 1930s included Dow Walling's Skeets and Harry Haenigsen's Our Bill, both of which had long runs. H. T. Webster's arrival in 1931 led to a rotating roster of cartoon features: The Timid Soul was seen on both Sunday and Monday. Youth's glories (The Thrill That Comes Once in a Lifetime) and the downside (Life's Darkest Moment) appeared on Saturdays and Tuesdays. On Wednesday, The Unseen Audience offered satirical jabs at radio. How to Torture Your Husband (or Wife) was published each Thursday, and the week ended with Bridge on Fridays.

Strips begun in the 1940s included Haenigsen's Penny and Leslie Charteris & Mike Roy's The Saint. Buell Weare stepped in as the syndicate business manager in 1946 and Harold Straubing was comics editor c. 1946-1954. In the period 1947–1948, the syndicate tried out a number of weekly filler strips, none of which were particularly successful.

Mell Lazarus' Miss Peach and Johnny Hart's B.C. debuted in 1957 and 1958 respectively, and both went on to long runs (though ultimately with other syndicates).

In 1963, New York Herald Tribune publisher John Hay Whitney (who also owned the Chicago-based Field Enterprises) acquired the Chicago-based Publishers Syndicate, merging Publishers' existing syndication operations with the New York Herald Tribune Syndicate, Field's Chicago Sun-Times Syndicate, and the syndicate of the Chicago Daily News (a newspaper that had been acquired by Field Enterprises in 1959). When the New York Herald Tribune folded in 1966, Publishers inherited the Tribune Syndicate's strips, including B.C., Miss Peach, and Penny.

In 1967, Field Enterprises acquired Robert M. Hall's New York-based Hall Syndicate, merging it with Publishers to form the Publishers-Hall Syndicate.

== N.Y. Herald Tribune Syndicate strips and panels ==
- B.C. by Johnny Hart (1958–1966) — still running; now syndicated by Creators Syndicate
- Betty by Charles Voight (April 4, 1920–1943) — Sunday-only strip; acquired from the McClure Syndicate
- Bodyguard / Ben Friday / Bantam Prince by Lawrence Lariar and John Spranger and Carl Pfeufer (May 2, 1948–February 28, 1954)
- Clarence (1921–1948) originally by Crawford Young (1921–1929), then Weare Holbrook and Frank Fogarty (1929–1948)
- Coogy by Irving Spector (1951–1954)
- Dudley D. by Dave Gantz (1961–1963; continued until 1964 by Publishers Syndicate)
- The Duke and The Duchess by Kin Platt (April 20, 1952–April 18, 1954) — weekly filler strip
- G. Whizz Jr. by Bill Holman (c. 1924-c. 1931) — also known as Gee Whiz Junior and simply Junior
- Jeanie by Selma Diamond and Gill Fox, and later art by Leon Winik (August 26, 1951–September 27, 1953)
- Jeff Crockett by Mel Casson (March 8th, 1948-March 5th, 1949)
- Miss Peach by Mell Lazarus (1957–1966; continued by the Field Syndicate and later Creators)
- Mr. and Mrs. (1919–1963) originally by Clare Briggs (1919–1930); then by Arthur Folwell, Frank Fogarty & Ellison Hoover (1930–1947); then by Kin Platt (1947–1963)
- Our Bill by Harry Haenigsen (March 6, 1939–1966)
- Penny by Harry Haenigsen (1943–1966; continued until 1970 by Publishers Syndicate and Publishers-Hall)
- Peter Rabbit by Harrison Cady and later Vincent Fago (August 15, 1920–1957)
- Peter Piltdown / Pookie by Mal Eaton (December 22, 1947–February 29, 1948) — weekly filler strip
- Poor Arnold's Almanac by Arnold Roth (1959–1961)
- The Saint by Leslie Charteris and Mike Roy, and later John Spranger, Bob Lubbers, and Doug Wildey (September 27, 1948–September 16, 1961)
- Shaggy by "Gould" (October 7, 1945–July 11, 1948) — weekly filler strip
- Silver Linings by Harvey Kurtzman (March 7, 1948–June 20, 1948)
- Skeets by Dow Walling (1932–1951)
- Specs by R. Gustafson (May 12, 1946–May 25, 1947) — weekly filler strip
- The Timid Soul / Caspar Milquetoast by H. T. Webster (1931–1953) — originated with the New York World in c. 1924
- Tizzy by Mal Eaton (1947–1948)

== See also ==
- Comic strip syndication
