= Penny (comic strip) =

American comic strip by Harry Haenigsen

- Harry Haenigsen's Penny (January 21, 1951). To see this image at full resolution, go to I Love Comix Archive.
- Author: Harry Haenigsen; Bill Hoest (1965–c. 1968)
- Current status/schedule: Concluded Daily & Sunday strip
- Launch date: June 27, 1943
- End date: October 25, 1970
- Syndicate(s): New York Herald Tribune Syndicate
- Genre(s): Teens, Humor

Penny was a comic strip about a teenage girl by Harry Haenigsen which maintained its popularity for almost three decades. It was distributed by the New York Herald Tribune Syndicate from June 27, 1943, to October 25, 1970.

== Publication history ==
Penny began because Helen Rogers Reid, the wife of the New York Herald Tribune publisher Ogden Mills Reid, wanted to see a girl as the central character of a new comic strip.

Haenigsen had been doing a strip about a teenage boy, Our Bill (1939–1963), when he launched Penny as a Sunday strip on June 27, 1943. A daily strip debuted September 3, 1945.

The prolific cartoonist Bill Hoest (later to create The Lockhorns) was Haenigsen's assistant on Penny. After an injury from a 1965 traffic accident kept Haenigsen away from the drawing board, Hoest took over most of the work, although Haenigsen still supervised and signed each Penny strip.

In 1970, Hoest left to start his own strip, My Son John, so Haenigsen ended the strip and retired.

== Characters and story ==
Comics historian Don Markstein described the title character and her confused parents:

== Reception ==
In 1947, Nancy Blair of Lambertville, New Jersey was the winner in a Penny look-alike contest staged by the New Hope Recreation Center in New Hope, Pennsylvania.

In 1955, Vladimir Nabokov wrote the following description of Penny into his novel Lolita: "Her eyes would follow the adventures of her favorite strip characters; there was one well-drawn sloppy bobby-soxer with high cheekbones and angular gestures, that I was not above enjoying myself."

== See alsoThe Lockhorns ==
- Aggie Mack
- Freckles and His Friends
- Harold Teen
- Teena
- Zits
