= Kin Platt =

American cartoonist (1911–2003)

- Born: December 8, 1911
- Died: November 30, 2003 (aged 91) New York City, U.S.
- Areas: Writer, Artist
- Awards: Edgar Award (1967)

Kin Platt (December 8, 1911 – November 30, 2003) was an American writer, artist, painter, sculptor, caricaturist, and comics artist, best known for penning radio comedy and animated TV series, as well as children's mystery novels, one of which earned him the Mystery Writers of America Edgar Award.

He additionally wrote and drew comic books (creating an early talking animal superhero, Supermouse) and comic strips.

== Biography ==
=== Early life and career ===
Kin Platt was born to Etta (née Hochberg) and Daniel Platt. In the mid-1930s he wrote radio comedy for George Burns, Jack Benny, the comedy team of Stoopnagle and Budd, and The National Biscuit Comedy Hour of 1936. Later in the 1930s, he wrote for Disney and Walter Lantz theatrical cartoons, and he scripted the Robert Benchley film How to Read (1938).

=== Comic books ===
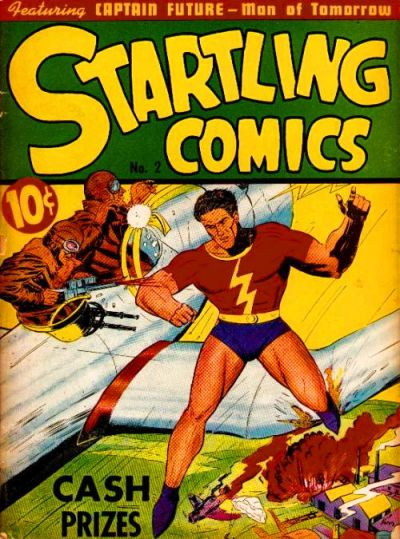
Startling Comics #2 (Aug. 1940). Captain Future cover art by Platt.

He broke into comic books with humor stories featuring the character "Happy" in the Better Comics omnibus Best Comics #1 (Nov. 1939). Platt went on to write and draw many features in the next few issues and to draw such features as "Captain Future" in Better's Startling Comics; "The Mask" (no relation to the 1990s Dark Horse Comics character), featuring a district attorney turned costumed crimefighter, in Exciting Comics; and writer Richard Hughes' Doc Savage-like "Doc Strange" (no relation to Marvel Comics' Dr. Strange), in Thrilling Comics.

After doing WWII military service with the U.S. Army Air Force's Air Transport Command from 1943 to 1946, Platt began working for such comic-book companies as Timely Comics (the 1940s predecessor of Marvel Comics), for which his features included "Widjet Witch" in Comedy Comics); and Better/Nedor/Standard, where he created Supermouse in 1948. Additionally, Platt wrote for the Bob Hope and Jerry Lewis comics at DC. For two years he drew the adventures of Pepsi and Pete for the advertising strip, Pepsi Cola Cops.

Al Jaffee, then an editor of Timely's humor comics, recalled in 2004,

I knew Kin. Dave Gantz said that Kin created [the print-advertising comic strip] the Pepsi Cola Cops. I didn't know Kin had done that, but it was his style. That may have been what brought him to Stan Lee. Kin sort of looked like Groucho Marx and had both Groucho's sense of humor and delivery; a very funny guy. He wrote very well and did so in a lot of mediums. He was one of the truly gifted guys in our business, very smart and very talented. Whenever he came into the office, things got lively. I also remember getting together with Kin and his wife in Long Island after the war. I don't doubt that Kin created Squat Car Squad, since it'd been something he was familiar with.

For the New York Herald Tribune Syndicate, Platt wrote and drew the comic strip Mr. and Mrs.(originally by Clare Briggs) from 1947 to 1963, and The Duke and the Duchess from 1950 to 1954. Additionally, he drew theatrical caricatures for such newspapers and magazines as The Village Voice and the Los Angeles Times.

In the 1960s, Platt scripted TV animation, including for the Hanna-Barbera series The Jetsons, The Flintstones, Yogi Bear, Top Cat and Jonny Quest (for which at one point he held the title of "story director"), as well as for Hal Seeger Productions' Milton the Monster.

=== Young-readers' literature ===
Plat began writing children's books and young-adult mysteries in 1961. He eventually published more than 30 books, including general-reader mysteries. His pseudonyms included Guy West, Alan West, Wesley Simon York, Nick Tall, Nick West, Noah Zark and Kirby Carr. Platt wrote several novels in the "Hitman" series under the name Kirby Carr.

Platt also returned to comics around this time, writing occasional stories for the DC Comics titles G.I. Combat, Our Army at War and Star Spangled War Stories in 1964. His final known comics credit is a 48-page adaptation of Robert Louis Stevenson's Dr. Jekyll and Mr. Hyde in Marvel Classics Comics #1 (1976).

=== Later career ===
The 1973 film Baxter!, a psychological drama starring Patricia Neal, was based on a book by Platt, The Boy Who Could Make Himself Disappear.

He continued writing books throughout the 1980s, though some novels remained unpublished. This material, as well as unpublished caricatures submitted to magazines and newspapers, was donated to the Howard Gotlieb Archival Research Center at Boston University. Big Max and the Missing Giraffe was published posthumously by HarperTrophy in 2005.

== Awards ==
- 1967 Edgar Award for juvenile mystery, for Sinbad and Me
- 1970 Edgar Award nomination, for The Mystery of the Witch Who Wouldn't

== Bibliography ==
=== Children's books ===
- Big Max, illustrated by Robert Lopshire (1965)
- Walt Disney's Snow White and Donald Duck (Whitman, 1967; as Nick Tall)
- Walt Disney's Donald Duck Buried Treasure, illustrated by Anthony Strobl (Whitman, 1968; as Nick Tall)
- Woody Woodpecker and the Busy Beavers (Whitman, 1968; as Nick Tall)
- Mystery of the Coughing Dragon (Alfred Hitchcock and the Three Investigators series, Book 14) (1970; as Nick West)
- Mystery of the Nervous Lion (Alfred Hitchcock and the Three Investigators series, Book 16) (1971; as Nick West)
- The Call of the Wild (comic book adaptation by Platt, illustrated by Fred Carrillo (Pendulum Press, 1973)
- Dr. Jekyll and Mr. Hyde (comic book adaptation by Platt, illustrated by Nestor Redondo) (Pendulum Press, 1973)
- Robert Louis Stevenson: Kidnapped (comic book adaptation as Nick Tall, illustrated by Frank Redondo) (Pendulum Press, 1974)
- Sir Arthur Conan Doyle: The Great Adventures of Sherlock Holmes (comic book adaptation as Nick Tall, illustrated by Nestor Redondo) (Pendulum Press, 1974)
- Big Max and the Mystery of the Missing Moose (HarperCollins, 1977)
- Darwin and the Great Beasts (Self-illustrated) (Greenwillow, 1992)
- Big Max and the Mystery of the Missing Giraffe, illustrated by Lynne Cravath (HarperCollins, 2005)

=== Young adult books ===
- The Boy Who Could Make Himself Disappear (Chilton, 1968)
- Hey, Dummy (Chilton, 1971)
- Chloris and the Creeps (Chilton, 1973)
- Chloris and the Freaks (Bradbury, 1975)
- Headman (Greenwillow, 1975)
- The Terrible Love Life of Dudley Cornflower (Bradbury, 1976)
- Run for Your Life (F. Watts, 1977)
- Chloris and the Weirdos (Bradbury, 1978)
- The Doomsday Gang (Greenwillow, 1978)
- Dracula, Go Home (F. Watts, 1979)
- The Ape Inside Me (Crowell, 1980)
- Flames Going Out (Methuen, 1980)
- Brogg's Brain (Crowell, 1981)
- Frank and Stein and Me (F. Watts, 1982)
- Crocker (Lippincott, 1983)
- A Mystery for Thoreau (Farrar, Straus and Giroux, 2008)

=== "Steve Forrester" young-adult mysteries ===
- The Blue Man (Harper, 1961)
- Sinbad and Me (Chilton, 1966)
- The Mystery of the Witch Who Wouldn't (Chilton, 1969)
- The Ghost of Hellsfire Street (Delacorte, 1980)

=== Mysteries ===
- Dead as They Come (Random House, 1972)
- A Pride of Women (Robert Hale, 1974)
- Murder in Rosslare (Walker, 1986)

=== "Max Roper" mysteries ===
- The Pushbutton Butterfly (Random House, 1970)
- The Kissing Gourami (Random House, 1970)
- The Princess Stakes Murder (Random House, 1973)
- The Giant Kill (Random House, 1974)
- Match Point for Murder (Random House, 1975)
- The Body Beautiful Murder (Random House, 1976)
- The Screwball King Murder (Random House, 1978)

=== "Hitman" Series (as Kirby Carr) ===
- Who Killed You, Cindy Castle (Canyon Books, 1974)
- Let Me Kill You, Sweetheart (Canyon Books, 1974)
- The Girls Who Came To Murder (Canyon Books, 1974)
- They're Coming to Kill You, Jane (Canyon Books, 1975)
- You Die Next, Jill Baby (Major Books, 1975)
- You're Hired, You're Dead (Major Books, 1975)
- Don't Bet on Living Alice (Major Books, 1975)
- The Impossible Spy (Major Books, 1976)

=== Adult books (various pseudonyms) ===
- Sex Heel as Guy West
- Group Grope as Alan West
- Pandora as Guy York
- Lovers & Exorcists as Wesley Simon York
