= Laugh Parade =

American comic strip

Laugh Parade by Bunny Hoest and John Reiner

Laugh Parade was a group of weekly gag cartoons written by Bunny Hoest and drawn by John Reiner. It ran in Parade, a Sunday newspaper magazine supplement.

== Overview ==
Laugh Parade displayed three or four single-panel cartoons, one of which was Howard Huge. Reiner used an ink wash to give the strip a greyish, monochromatic tone. Hoest and Reiner collaborate on another cartoon series called The Lockhorns, which is distributed by King Features Syndicate. The Lockhorns was created in 1968 by Bill Hoest, who followed with the creation of Laugh Parade in 1980 and Howard Huge in 1981.

In 1986, the publishers of Parade, Advance Magazine Publishers, Inc., filed for a trademark of Laugh Parade, and they renewed that trademark in 2007.

The Hoest and Reiner feature had no association with the humor magazine Laugh Parade, published during the 1960s and 1970s by Magazine Management. That publication featured cartoons by Don Orehek and others.

== Awards ==
Reiner won the National Cartoonists Society's Gag Cartoons Award in 1994.
