= Frank Fogarty =

American comic strip artist (1887–1978)

- Born: 1887 New York City, U.S.
- Died: 1984 (aged 96–97)
- Area: Artist
- Notable works: Clarence (1929–1948); Mr. and Mrs. (1930–c. 1946)
- Awards: National Cartoonists Society Silver T-Square Extraordinary Service Award, 1971; National Cartoonist Society Special Features Award, 1973

Frank Fogarty (1887–1978) was an American comic strip artist, primarily active in the 1930s and 1940s.

== Biography ==
A native New Yorker, Fogarty worked in his teens as a copy boy at the New York World. Editors there pooled their money to send him to the Art Students League of New York, where fellow students included George Bellows and Rockwell Kent. After working for the American Press Association, Fogarty went on to be art director for The New York Sun.

Originally specializing in sports and political cartoons, Fogarty illustrated the comic strip Clarence from 1929 through 1948, and the comic strip Mr. and Mrs. from 1930 to 1947, both of which were distributed by the New York Herald Tribune Syndicate.

In the period 1951 to 1954, he worked in the comic book industry, for Better Publications, Eastern Color Printing, and Marvel Comics, where he assisted Al Jaffee on Patsy Walker.

He later worked in the film industry, for Warner Bros., David O. Selznick's Selznick Motion Pictures, and then Johnson Features.

Late in life, Fogarty specialized in creating "illuminated scrolls" (in the manner of medieval illuminated manuscripts) which he mailed to public figures he admired, such as John F. Kennedy, Dwight D. Eisenhower, John Wayne, Jack Dempsey, Neil Simon, Igor Sikorsky, and the comedy duo Bob and Ray. For this work he was nicknamed "Holy Pictures" Fogarty and was presented with the National Cartoonists Society Special Features Award in 1973. He also won the National Cartoonist Society Silver T-Square Extraordinary Service Award in 1971.
