= Migas canas =

Spanish dish

Migas canas is a traditional preparation of fried bread and milk. It is often consumed in rural areas of Spain and is associated with people of humble origin and shepherds. It is served in a clay pot for breakfast. The dish is often prepared with milk, and bread, deep fried, and then sprinkled with sugar and cinnamon.

== Features ==
It is usually cooked in a kind of cauldron, where butter is fried with garlic and paprika. Then, bread and milk (preferably sheep's or goat's milk) is added.

== See also ==
- Pain perdu
- Sop
- Sopa de gato
- Spanish cuisine
