= Sopa de gato =

Thick soup from southern Spain

Sopa de gato (in English: 'cat soup') is a simple soup typical of the classic cuisine of southern Spain. It is a very thick sopa (soup), typically made from water, bread, oil, garlic and salt, and served hot. It is a suitable dish for the winter months.

== History ==
In the 16th century, the city of Cádiz was besieged by pirates and subject to continual looting and raids. In light of the resulting widespread hunger, sopa de gato was born out of the creativity and necessity of the locals. This soup, as it spread throughout the country when it reached the Madrid court of the eighteenth and nineteenth centuries, became the well-known garlic soups that were so popular in the cafés of the time. The big difference was the paprika and the eggs that were spun almost whole over the soup. The wet breads kept their structure and were not diluted as in cat soups.

== See also ==
- List of soups
- Migas canas
- Sop
- Spanish cuisine
