= Clare Briggs =

American cartoonist (1875–1930)

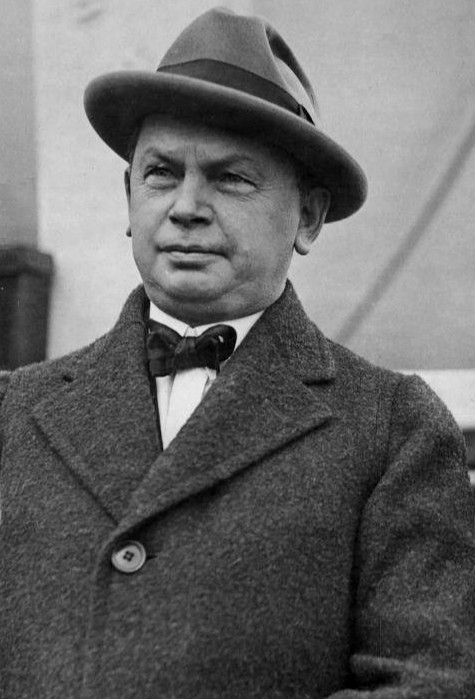
- Briggs in 1922
- Born: August 5, 1875 Reedsburg, Wisconsin
- Died: January 3, 1930 (aged 54) Baltimore
- Area: Cartoonist
- Notable works: When a Feller Needs a Friend; Ain't It a Grand and Glorious Feeling? The Days of Real Sport; Mr. and Mrs..
- Spouses: Ruth Owen (m. 1900; div. 1929) Marie C. Briggs a.k.a. Maggie Touhey (m. 1929–1930)
- Children: 3

Clare A. Briggs (August 5, 1875 – January 3, 1930) was an early American comic strip artist who rose to fame in 1904 with his strip A. Piker Clerk. Briggs was best known for his later comic strips When a Feller Needs a Friend, Ain't It a Grand and Glorious Feeling?, The Days of Real Sport, and Mr. and Mrs.

== Early life ==
Born in Reedsburg, Wisconsin, Briggs lived there until the age of nine. In 1884, his family moved to Dixon, Illinois, where he started his newspaper career at age ten, delivering the local paper to subscribers for 40 cents a week while wearing a red, white and blue cap with the name of the newspaper.

Briggs had three brothers, who grew up to all have creative careers, one as a musician, one as a writer, and the third in advertising. After five years in Dixon, Briggs was 14 when his family relocated to Lincoln, Nebraska, where he lived until 1896 when he was 21. Life in the Midwest gave Briggs the source material for the small town Americana that he later depicted in his cartoons.

== A push from Pershing ==
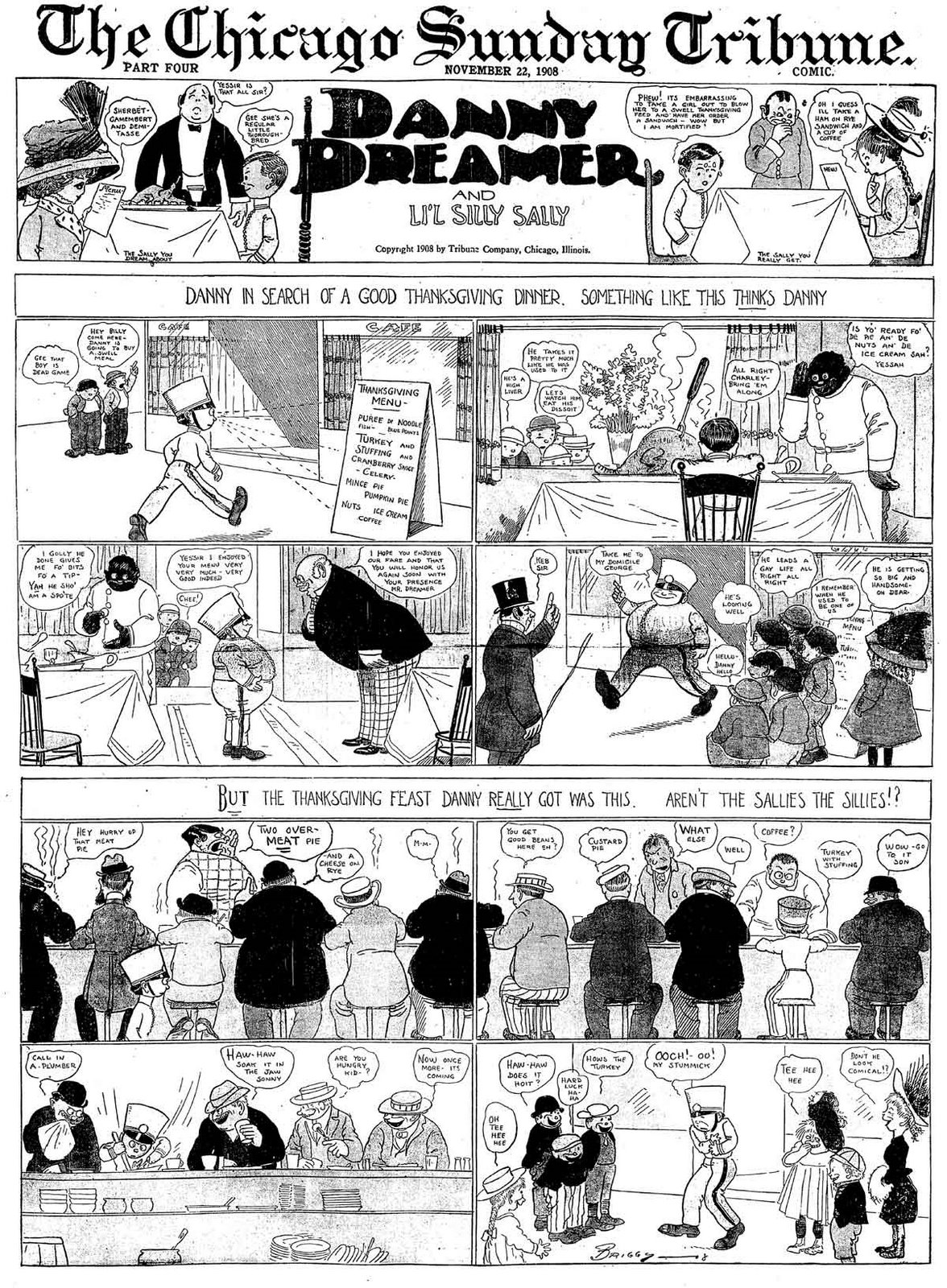
Clare Briggs's Danny Dreamer (November 22, 1908)

While attending the University of Nebraska for two years, he studied drawing and stenography. Employment as a stenographer brought him six dollars a week when the work was available. One of his art instructors was an editor with Western Penman, where his first published drawings appeared. His mathematics teacher was Lieutenant John J. Pershing. "If ever a fellow needed a friend, I did in mathematics," said Briggs. "It happened that Lieutenant Pershing was my instructor, and I believe he will testify that it was easier to conquer Germany than to teach me math. One day he ordered me to the blackboard to demonstrate a theorem, and while I was giving the problem a hard but losing battle, he remarked: 'Briggs, sit down, you don't know anything.' Right then and there, I decided to become a newspaper man."

On July 18, 1900, he married Ruth Owen of Lincoln. He began his career as a newspaper sketch artist in St. Louis, Missouri with the Globe-Democrat, which sent him off to cover the Spanish–American War as an editorial cartoonist. Relocating in New York, his drawings for the New York Journal prompted William Randolph Hearst to send Briggs to the Chicago Herald and the Chicago's American, where he created A. Piker Clerk, often described as the first daily continuity comic strip. After 17 years in Chicago (living in the community of Riverside, Illinois), Briggs returned to New York to spend the remaining 13 years of his life with the New York Tribune. He lived in to the suburban community of New Rochelle, a well-known art colony and home to a majority of the top commercial illustrators of the day. During the 1920s, the New Rochelle Art Association commissioned its best known artists to create a series of signs on major roadways to mark the borders, including "New Rochelle The Place To Come When a Feller Needs a Friend", which was created by Briggs representing one of his major comics, "When a Feller Needs a Friend".

Clare and Ruth Owen Briggs were together for 29 years and had three children. They divorced in February 1929. Briggs died ten months later, leaving his estate of $90,067 to Ruth Briggs. However, the will was challenged by his second wife, Marie C. Briggs, aka Maggie Touhey.

== Vaudeville, films and radio ==
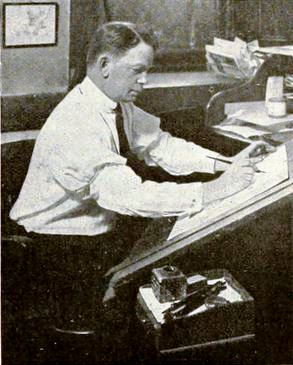
Briggs at work in 1919

Briggs was a popular lecturer, earning $100 for a single speech. He accepted a five-week contract for $500 a week to appear on the vaudeville circuit in 1914. In 1919, he produced four comedy film shorts for Paramount Pictures.

The Mr. and Mrs. radio series, based on Briggs's strip, starred Jack Smart and Jane Houston as Jo and Vi. The series was broadcast on CBS from 1929 to 1931.

National catchphrases caught on from the titles of some of his newspaper cartoon features: Ain't It a Grand and Glorious Feeling?, Danny Dreamer, The Days of Real Sport, Movie of a Man, Mr. and Mrs, Real Folks at Home, Someone's Always Taking the Joy Out of Life, There's at Least One in Every Office and When a Feller Needs a Friend. Mr. and Mrs. ran during the last years of his life and continued in syndication by the New York Herald Tribune Syndicate after his death under his name. (The names of Arthur Folwell and Ellison Hoover finally appeared on the strip in 1938; Frank Fogarty illustrated the Sunday strips from 1930 to 1946.) In 1947, the strip was taken over by Kin Platt, who continued it until 1963.

His daughter, Clare Briggs, also was a comic strip artist and had an eponymous strip syndicated from 1939 through 1941. She used the name "Miss Clare Briggs" to distinguish her work from her father's.

In September 1929, neuritis of the optic nerve led Briggs to Baltimore for treatment at Johns Hopkins Hospital. He died at the Neurological Institute of pneumonia on January 3, 1930. As he had requested, his ashes were scattered over New York Harbor.

Briggs's death in 1930 prompted Franklin P. Adams to write:

I feel acutely the loss of a cartoonist whose work I have enjoyed hugely for 30 years. I enjoyed it so much that I got him to leave Chicago so that his work could appear in the New York Tribune with mine. It helped the paper so much that Clare stayed there for 15 years, seven years longer than I did. To my notion, he drew no dud cartoons. I never knew anyone who so enjoyed working. Often while drawing a cartoon I have seen him laugh uproariously at it. He was a sweet and merry boy, if a rotten poker player, and the public, poorer for his leaving it, is a big winner in having him at all.

== See also ==
- H. T. Webster
- J. R. Williams

== Sources ==
- Strickler, Dave. Syndicated Comic Strips and Artists, 1924–1995: The Complete Index. Cambria, California: Comics Access, 1995. ISBN 0-9700077-0-1
