= Sop =

Bread soaked in liquid and eaten

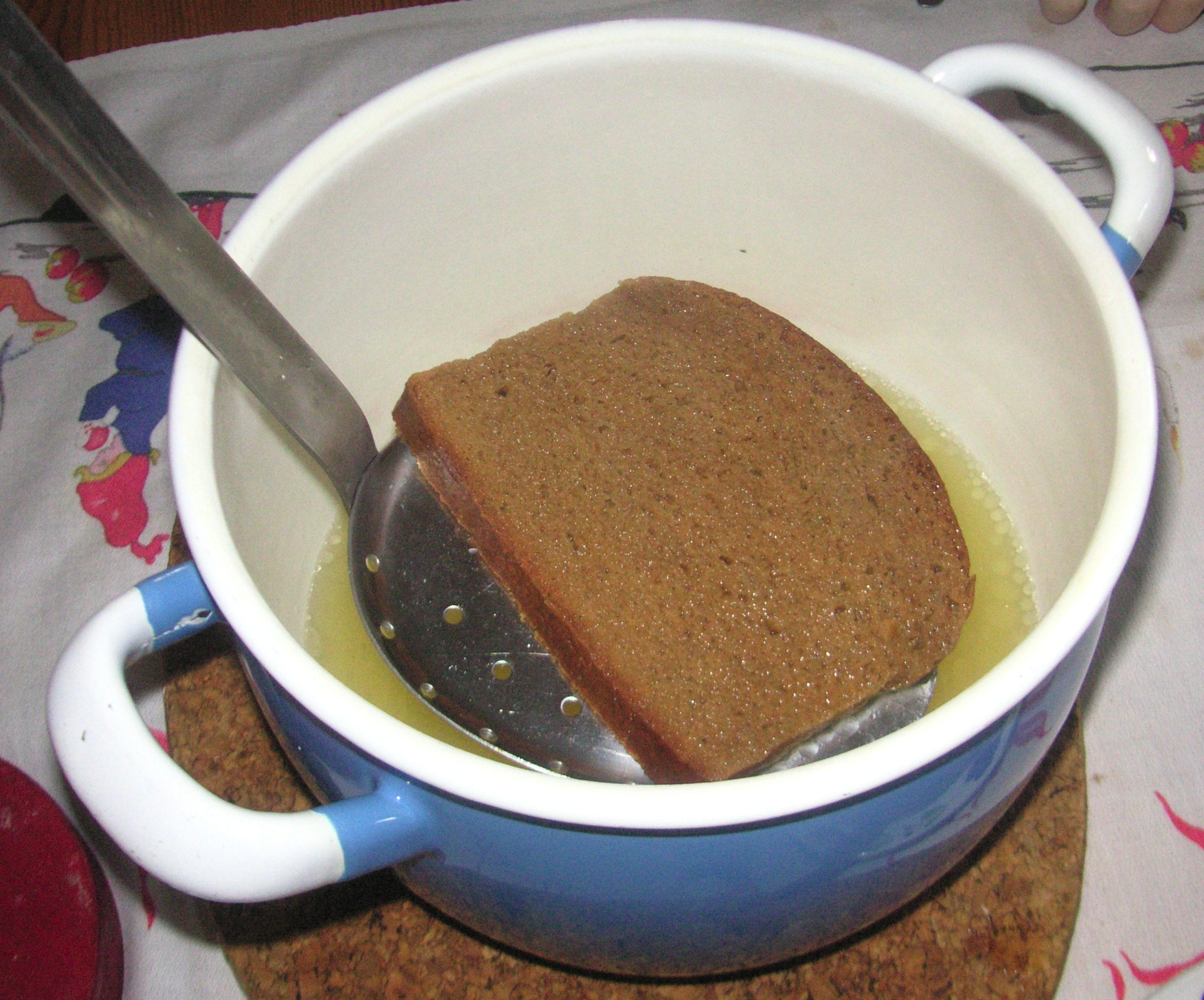
- Dopp i grytan, a traditional Swedish Christmas sop
- Type: Bread or toast
- Main ingredients: Bread soaked in liquid foodstuffs

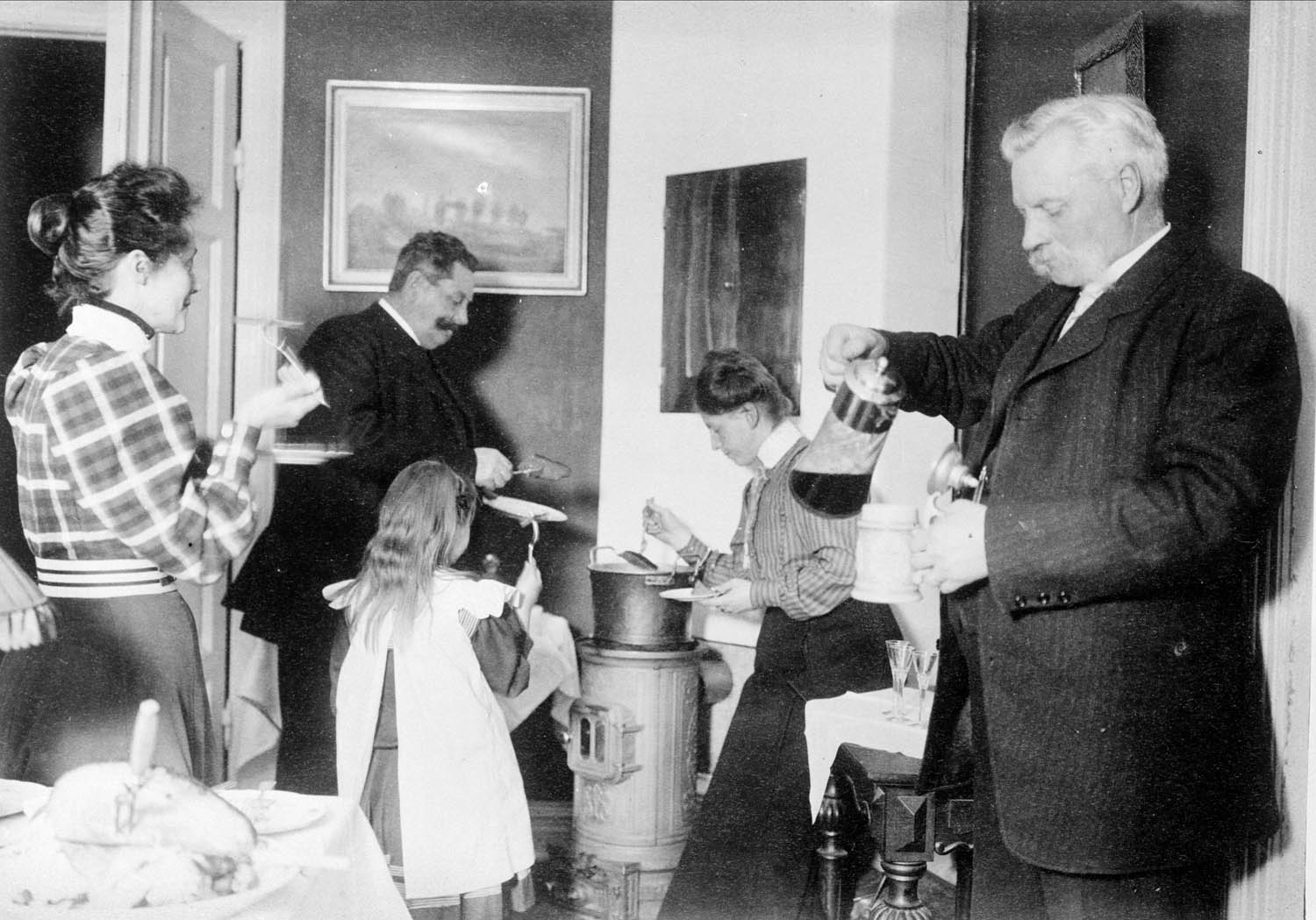
Sop at Christmas, Sweden, 1910

A sop is a piece of bread or toast that is drenched in liquid and then eaten. In medieval cuisine, sops were very common; they were served with broth, soup, or wine and then picked apart into smaller pieces to soak in the liquid. At elaborate feasts, bread was often pre-cut into finger-sized pieces rather than broken off by the diners themselves. The bread or croutons traditionally served with French onion soup, which took its current form in the 18th century, can be considered modern-day sops.

== Etymology ==
The word soup is a cognate of sop, both stemming ultimately from the same Germanic source.

In 19th-century Australia, sop referred to a dish consisting of stale damper, soaked in cold tea and served with a dollop of jam on top for taste. This was mainly used in prisons and poor-houses, as well as institutions such as asylums.

In Portuguese, the word sopa, among other meanings, can generally refer to soup or, particularly in Alentejo, to a piece of dry or even stale bread that is part of the traditional fish broth. The sopa is soaked in the broth and eaten.

== Expressions ==
The expression milksop describes a person as weak and indecisive. Its connotation is similar to that of "milquetoast".

The term supper derives from sop, and the expression toast of the town derives from the practices of dipping spiced toasted bread into liquid, and of honoring a dinner guest by referring to him or her by that term, which implies he or she adds spice to the dinner party.

== See also ==
- Fondue – Swiss melted cheese dish
- Migas canas – Spanish dish
- Milk toast – Breakfast dish
- Sopa de gato – Thick soup from southern Spain
- Trencher – Type of tableware used in medieval cuisine
