= John Reiner =

American cartoonist, born 1956

- Born: 1956 (age 69–70); New York City, U.S.
- Education: State University of New York at Stony Brook
- Occupation: Cartoonist
- Known for: The Lockhorns, Laugh Parade, Howard Huge

Laugh Parade by Bunny Hoest and John Reiner

John Reiner (born 1956) is a cartoonist who collaborates with writer Bunny Hoest on three cartoon series: The Lockhorns, syndicated by King Features, and Laugh Parade and Howard Huge (both for Parade magazine).

== Life and career ==
Born in New York City, Reiner was raised on Long Island, where he graduated from Smithtown High School in 1974. He attended the State University of New York at Stony Brook, where he was a contributing artist to Statesman, the student newspaper. He was a psychology major, graduating in 1978.

Mad cartoonist Mort Drucker, in 1974, encouraged him to consider cartooning as a career, and the following year, he began work on Joe Simon's humor magazines. Along with pages for Marvel Comics, Reiner did freelance advertising art, humorous illustrations and political caricatures. In 1984, he was an assistant on the comic strip Benchley, which Jerry Dumas and Drucker created to satirize the Washington political scene.

== The Hoest studio ==
Bill Hoest needed an assistant for his strips and cartoons, and in 1986, he hired Reiner to help on The Lockhorns, Agatha Crumm and What a Guy! Eventually, he was assisting on all the Hoest cartoons and strips. After Hoest's 1988 death, his widow Bunny Hoest kept the family business going, and Reiner remained as the artist, working in the turret studio of the Hoest mansion in Lloyd Neck, Long Island.

Reiner commented, “We get ideas for The Lockhorns from everyday observation, from interesting people, funny situations, driving or even at dinner.”

== Exhibitions ==
The Lockhorns, Memorial Gallery, Sinclair Hall, Farmingdale State College, September 14-November 14, 2010.

== Awards ==
He received the National Cartoonists Society's Gag Cartoon Award in 1994.
