= William Andrew Johnston =

American journalist and author

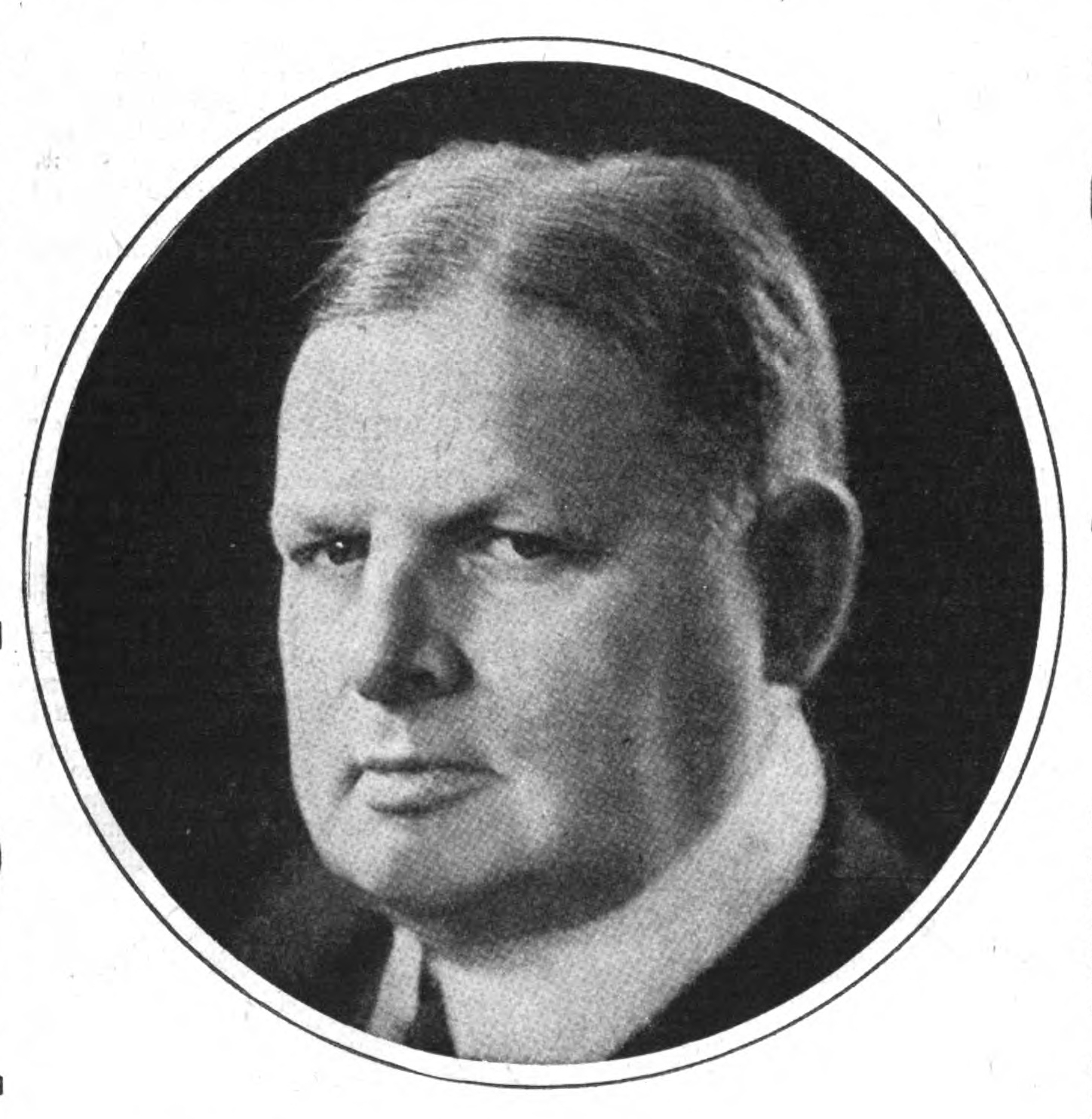
William Andrew Johnston in 1924

William Andrew Johnston (1871–1929) was an American journalist, writer, and co-founder, with George T. Delacorte Jr., of Dell Publishing.

== Personal ==
Johnston was born in Pittsburgh, Pennsylvania on January 26, 1871, the son of William Andrew and Agnes (Parry) Johnston. He graduated with a Litt.D from Western University of Pennsylvania (now the University of Pittsburgh) in 1891, where he was valedictorian. Soon after graduation, he moved to New York City and took a job at the New York World newspaper, where he worked for 27 years.

In 1921 he co-founded Dell Publishing. In 1927 he moved to Chicago, becoming vice-president of public relations for Celotex Corporation.

Johnston was married twice, first in 1896, to Hazel Minnette Williams of Hampshire, England, and second, in 1910, to Hattie Belle McCollum (1883–1963). of Lockport, New York He had a son, George E. Johnston.

He died in Chicago on February 16, 1929, at age 58.

== Publications ==
According to The New York Times', "most of Mr. Johnston's books were written from his experience as a reporter." He is best known for his books Limpy, the Boy Who Felt Neglected (1917), based on his own disability, and The Fun of Being a Fat Man (1922), again based on his life experience, in reaction to a book by Henri Beraud called The Tragedy of Being Fat (Le Martyre de l'obèse). He wrote a series of articles for Collier's from 1925-26, on the theme "if I were a...", such as "If I Were a Business Man", "If I Were a Clergyman", "If I Were a Doctor", "If I Were a Lawyer", "If I Were a Rich Man", "If I Were Out of a Job". He also wrote a number of detective stories, and non-fiction.

=== Fiction ===
- The Innocent Murders (1910)
- Solomon Sloan's Advice on how to Run the Universe
- The Yellow Letter (1911) free eBook
- Limpy, the Boy Who Felt Neglected (1917) free eBook
- The House of Whispers (1918) free eBook
- The Apartment Next Door (1919) free eBook
- The Mystery in the Ritsmore (1920) free eBook
- The Fun of Being a Fat Man (1922)
- The Tragedy at the Beach Club (1922)
- The Waddington Cipher (1923)
- These Women (1923)
- The Accidental Accomplice (1928)

=== Non-fiction ===
- History up to date (1899), History of the Spanish-American War
- My Own Main Street (1921) free eBook at The HathiTrust
- Webster's Bridge (1924) - with H. T. Webster
