= Harry Haenigsen =

American cartoonist

- Harry Haenigsen is seen drawing his character Penny Pringle in this photo by Maynard Clark.
- Born: Harry W. Haenigsen; July 14, 1900 New York City
- Died: May 29, 1991 (aged 90) Warminster, Pennsylvania
- Area: Cartoonist
- Notable works: Penny

Harry William Haenigsen (July 14, 1900 – May 29, 1991) was an American illustrator and cartoonist best known for Penny, his comic strip about a teenage girl. He also illustrated for books, magazines and advertising.

== Biography ==
Born in New York City, Haenigsen grew up in New Jersey, where he became interested in electricity and cartooning. He began to draw cartoons for a local paper while still in high school. He first studied to become an engineer. In 1917, he took Eugene Zimmerman's correspondence course in illustration. Although he was invited to attend Rutgers University on a scholarship, he followed the advice of the New York Evening World sports cartoonist Thornton Fish and enrolled at the Art Students League in New York, since Fish promised him a job at the New York World when there was an opening. Following employment at the Bray animation studios in 1918, he began illustrating for the World in 1919.

Some of his World illustrations were designs for constructing radio sets, and in 1922, he drew for the World his first comic strip, Simeon Batts, about radios and radio listeners. In 1930 he was drawing a humorous round-up of fake news stories comic strip called The News. When the World folded in 1931, he moved to the New York American. He expanded into illustrating for magazines, including Collier's.

Haenigsen was employed briefly at the Fleischer animation studios, and then drew Our Bill for the New York Herald-Tribune Syndicate beginning March 6, 1939. He continued that daily strip until 1966.

In 1931, Haenigsen first moved to Lumberville, Pennsylvania with his wife Bobby, but they stayed there only briefly. Using the stage name Jeanette E. Kerr, Bobby Haenigsen was a singer and dancer who worked with George M. Cohan and as a soloist with John Philip Sousa. The couple returned to the Solebury-New Hope area in 1939 and lived in Lambertville, New Jersey.

=== Penny ===
Penny began because Helen Rogers Reid, the wife of the New York Herald Tribune publisher Ogden Mills Reid, wanted to see a girl as the central character of a new comic strip. Haenigsen launched Penny on June 20, 1943, working with writer Howard Boughner (1908–1990). Comics scripter Kurt Busiek described Haenigsen's art approach with this strip:

Penny was a gag strip about the life of a confident, self-assured teenage girl, her oft-mystified parents and her friends, dates and such. It was amiably, breezy, funny—comfortable rather than edgy in any way—but the thing that made it stand out was the art. Harry Haenigsen, who also drew Our Bill, gave Penny Pringle the cheekbones of Katharine Hepburn, a chin that could cut glass, and a stylized coltish charm that just arrested the eye. Penny was fluff, but the graphics of it were bold and engaging, whether Penny's sprawling upside down in an armchair as she gabs on the phone, in a raccoon coat cheering on her school football team, wearing bluejeans in the bath to make sure they shrink right, or whatever else she did. The strip is a charming portrait of mid-century suburbia and teen-agia, light as a meringue and crisp as autumn leaves.

Haenigsen's Jive's Like That: Being the Life and Times of Our Bill was published by Procyon Press in 1947, and there were several Penny collections in 1953 and 1954, published by Prentice-Hall and Simon and Schuster. In 1956, Haenigsen was a contributor to the Famous Artists Cartoon Course.

The prolific cartoonist Bill Hoest was Haenigsen's assistant on Penny. After an injury from a 1965 traffic accident kept Haenigsen away from the drawing board, Hoest took over most of the work, although Haenigsen still supervised and signed each Penny strip. Haenigsen was also the director of the Bucks County Playhouse and the Playhouse Inn in New Hope, Pennsylvania.

With the death of Bobby Haenigsen in a 1968 car accident, Harry Haenigsen lost interest in his comic strip. In 1970, when Hoest left to start his own strip, My Son John, for the Chicago Tribune New York News Syndicate, Haenigsen chose to end Penny and retired.

He married Ellen A. Hall in 1977. In 1981, he was director of the first Lambertville Art Shad Festival, and that same year he published a shad cookbook. He also contributed a recipe to The Cartoonist Cookbook (1966).

Harry Haenigsen's Penny (1959)

A founding member of the National Cartoonists Society, Haenigsen was also a member of the Society of Illustrators, the Philadelphia Academy of Fine Arts, the Museum of Modern Art, the New York City Club and the New York City Coffee House.

In 1969, he was named to Who's Who in America, Volume 35. He died on May 29, 1991 at the Warminster General Hospital in Warminster, Pennsylvania.

== See also ==
- Marty Links
- Hal Rasmusson
