= Momma =

American comic strip

- The cover of a Momma collection
- Author: Mell Lazarus
- Current status/schedule: Concluded daily & Sunday strip; reruns
- Launch date: October 26, 1970
- End date: July 10, 2016
- Syndicate(s): Publishers-Hall Syndicate (1970–1975); Field Newspaper Syndicate (1975–c. 1987); Creators Syndicate (c. 1987–2016)
- Publisher(s): Dell; Sheed, Andrews, and McMeel
- Genre(s): humor, adults

Mell Lazarus's Momma (November 22, 2009)

Momma is an American comic strip by Mell Lazarus that ran from October 26, 1970, to July 10, 2016.

== Publication history ==
Momma was Lazarus' second strip; he had been publishing the syndicated strip Miss Peach since 1957. Debuting on October 26, 1970, Momma was initially distributed by the Publishers-Hall Syndicate, and later was handled by Creators Syndicate and published in more than 400 newspapers worldwide.

Creators Syndicate announced Momma's (and Mell Lazarus') death July 10, 2016, in a comic strip memorial that included other grieving comic strip characters.

== Characters and story ==
The central character is Sonya Hobbs, an annoying, short, widowed, opinionated senior citizen mother with a controlling, nagging personality. Although Lazarus based the character on his own mother, when he showed it to her, she thought the character was based on his aunt, exclaiming, “You caught Aunt Helen to a tee!”

"Momma" has three grown children:

- Thomas, her oldest, is employed, happily married to a woman named Tina, and has a baby boy named Charles, b.k.a. "Chuckie". As far as Momma is concerned, her son's wife is a blonde bimbo who will never do anything for Thomas as properly as Momma can. Tina doesn't think too highly of Momma either. A running gag is that Tina (while not a slacker at housekeeping) is often seen playing tennis instead of tending to hearth and home, even in inclement weather. While talking with friends, Sonya sometimes admits that she nags her younger children as she did not do so with Thomas, letting him live his life until he married Tina. While Thomas is generally the most self-sufficient of her children, on occasion he has been seen begging his mother for handouts, albeit not to the extent of his siblings, suggesting his job is not as rewarding as Sonya would have hoped for her son.
- Francis, her middle child, a chronic and shameless slacker, is the single largest source of her exasperation. It suits him perfectly to sponge off her and sometimes other people, yet he cannot be bothered to lift a finger to help or to clean his own apartment. He has a single taste in women: airheads built and dressed rather provocatively. Francis is often shown as chronically unemployed, trying to look for loopholes in work contracts. Other times he is working at blue-collar jobs or white-collar jobs at the lowest level, which do not seem to last long as management has no tolerance for his lackadaisical attitude.
- Marylou, her youngest and only daughter, has frequent relationship problems, particularly with her mother. She has a thing for losers, outcasts, and men who have yet to divorce their wives — the very types of men Momma hates. A source of agony for Sonya is seeing other women's daughters get married off to successful, well-heeled men, which mirrors how Sonya has to listen to other women boast of how their sons are so successful whereas Francis is either unemployed or employed in a menial job. Sometimes Sonya has nagged Marylou to get a job, albeit not the extent she has done with Francis. When Marylou said she considered nursing school in one strip, Sonya saw it not as a career, but a way for her daughter to be in a better position to snag a doctor for a husband.

While Momma constantly tries to make her children feel insignificant without her, they consider her to be an emotional burden. Still, they love her in their own way as she loves them in turn.

Other recurring characters in the strip include Mr. K, a bald senior citizen who attempts to court Sonya, but to whom she cannot bear the thought of remarriage. Her best friend is Mrs. Grimhaus, a woman with similar child concerns. Unlike Sonya, however, she has been married several times, all ending due to divorce or death. Normy is Francis' best friend, who has a similar outlook to Francis on life and work. Some strips show Normy's family, who relationship with his own mother is even more strained than that of Francis and Sonya.

Lesser parts of the strip show a flashback where Francis, Normy, and Thomas had all been ordered to serve an enlistment in the United States Army, and the trio sometimes reflects back on their service, joking how it was easier to handle than the trouble with their mothers.

During the course of the strip, Momma has a variety of dream sequences, which include a homeless Francis holding a cup for donations. Other dream sequences include her late husband Jerome and herself at the gates of Heaven, awaiting entrance. Sometimes Jerome appears as an angel in a case where Sonya does not know what to do about her children or another problem in life.

== Collected editions ==
Book collections include Momma (Dell, 1972) and The Momma Treasury (Sheed, Andrews, and McMeel treasury series, 1978).
