= Bill Hoest =

American cartoonist (1926–1988)

- Bill Hoest self-portrait
- Born: William Pierce Hoest; February 7, 1926 Newark, New Jersey, U.S.
- Died: November 7, 1988 (aged 62) Lloyd Harbor, New York, U.S.
- Area: Cartoonist
- Notable works: The Lockhorns; Laugh Parade
- Awards: National Cartoonists Society, 1976, 1977, 1980
- Spouse: Bunny Hoest (m. 1973)

William Pierce Hoest (February 7, 1926 – November 7, 1988) was an American cartoonist best known as the creator of the cartoon series The Lockhorns, distributed by King Features Syndicate to 500 newspapers in 23 countries, and Laugh Parade for Parade. He also created other syndicated strips and panels for King Features. His wife Bunny Hoest succeeded him as writer for The Lockhorns after his death, continuing to this day.

== Biography ==
Born in Newark, New Jersey, Hoest spent two years in the Navy and studied art at Cooper Union. He started his art career in 1948 as a greeting card designer with Norcross Greeting Cards, continuing in that field until 1951 when he left to become a freelancer. His cartoons soon began appearing in Collier's, Playboy, The Saturday Evening Post and other magazines.

=== Comic strips ===
Hoest entered the comic strip community in 1960 with My Son John, for the Chicago Tribune New York News Syndicate. It lasted two years, ending in 1962.

He then became an assistant on Harry Haenigsen's Penny. After an injury from a 1965 traffic accident kept Haenigsen away from the drawing board, Hoest took over most of the work, although Haenigsen still supervised and signed each Penny strip.

Hoest was one of the cartoonists featured in Think Small, a 1967 promotional book distributed as a giveaway by Volkswagen dealers. Top cartoonists of that decade drew cartoons showing Volkswagens, and these were published along with amusing automotive essays by such humorists as H. Allen Smith, Roger Price and Jean Shepherd.

While working on Penny, Hoest began his cartoons about a bickering couple, The Lockhorns, as a single-panel daily on September 9, 1968, with the Sunday feature launched April 9, 1972. He then took an alternate route with Bumper Snickers (1974), a cartoon series about cars and drivers for the National Enquirer. His King Features comic strip, Agatha Crumm, was published as both a daily and a Sunday strip from 1977 to 1996. What a Guy!, co-created with his assistant John Reiner, was syndicated by King Features from 1987 to 1996.

=== Laugh Parade ===
Hired as the cartoon editor of Parade in 1979, Hoest created Laugh Parade for that Sunday supplement magazine in 1980. For Laugh Parade, he ganged together several miscellaneous cartoons, adding Howard Huge to that mix in 1981.

Hoest was reportedly a diligent cartoonist, putting in ten hours a day at his drawing board. "It is a business, and I have to treat it like a business. I keep busy. That's the way I make my living".

== Personal life and death ==
He was president of the National Cartoonists Society at the time of his death. Hoest, who lived in Lloyd Neck, Long Island, was 62 when he died of lymphoma at New York Medical Center. He was survived by his wife, Bunny Hoest; his mother, Dorothea Whittinghill of Lloyd Neck; and nine children and stepchildren.

After Hoest's death, John Reiner continued to illustrate all the features, while Hoest's widow, Bunny Hoest, took over the scripting. Reiner recalled:

Bill Hoest insisted on doing each of his comics meticulously. The artwork, writing, lettering and inking were all done in such a way as to meet his high self-imposed standards. I came to realize that his success, which so many cartoonists young and old tried to analyze, was the result of a simple rule: Learn to do each segment of a comic professionally. Bill Hoest could draw well, letter attractively and legibly, design in an eye-catching fashion, direct and control the action and expression of his characters, and write material that was genuinely funny. He then blended the elements to produce work that stood out on the comics page. I must now meet that same standard of excellence.

== Awards ==
Bill Hoest received three National Cartoonists Society awards. The Lockhorns was named the best syndicated panel of 1976 and 1980 by the NCS, and he also won in the gag cartoon division in 1977.

== Bibliography ==
- Santa's Little Helpers, A Christmas Story Polygraphic Co of America, 1952.
- Think Small Volkswagen, 1967.
- The Lockhorns: What's the Garbage Doing on the Stove? Signet, 1975.
- Bumper Snickers. Signet: 1976.
- The Lockhorns: Loretta, the Meat Loaf Is Moving. Signet, 1976.
- The Lockhorns: Who Made the Caesar Salad—Brutus? Signet, 1977.
- Hoest Toasties. Tempo Star Books: 1978. ISBN 978-0-441-33980-8
- More Bumper Snickers. Signet, 1979.
- The Lockhorns: Is This Steak or Charcoal? Signet, 1979.
- Agatha Crumm. Signet: 1980.
- Howard Huge. Lyle Stuart, 1981.
- The Lockhorns: I See You Burned the Cold Cuts Again. NAL, 1981. ISBN 0-451-09711-4
- The Return of Agatha Crumm. Signet, 1982. ISBN 0-451-11526-0
- Even More Bumper Snickers. Signet, 1982. ISBN 0-451-11399-3
- The Lockhorns: Giant Size. Tor Books, 1984.
- The Lockhorns. Tor Books, 1990. ISBN 0-8125-1020-8.
- The Lockhorns: What Do You Mean You Weren't Listening? I Didn't Say Anything. Tor Books. 2001. ISBN 0-8125-7258-0.
