= The Blue Man =

1961 novel by Kin Platt

- First edition
- Author: Kin Platt
- Language: English
- Genre: Science fiction, Mystery novel
- Publisher: Harper & Row
- Publication date: 1961
- Publication place: United States

The Blue Man is a mystery, science fiction novel written by American author Kin Platt. It is the first in the four-book Steve Forrester series. It was released by Harper Books in 1961 and reissued by Twin Lakes Press in 2005.

According to Kirkus Reviews, it is written in "colloquial teenage jargon".

== Plot summary ==
Steve Forrester is a teenager who goes to live for a summer with his aunt and uncle, who run a rural motel.

On his first day running the desk by himself, a strange man checks in, dressed in a scarf, hat, trench coat and gloves, unusual attire for summer. The light on the desk starts to flicker as the man signs in with an illegible scrawl. Later, Steve brings a towel to the stranger's room and sees something that launches him on an unusual and singular adventure: the man's skin is bright blue and he seems to be draining energy from a nearby lamp.

After his uncle is seemingly murdered by the fleeing Blue Man (who appears to possibly be of alien origin), Steve sets out on a cross-country search for justice and revenge.

== Steve Forrester books by Kin Platt ==
- The Blue Man (Harper, 1961)
- Sinbad and Me (Chilton, 1966)
- The Mystery of the Witch Who Wouldn't (Chilton, 1969)
- The Ghost of Hellsfire Street (Delacorte, 1980)
