= Agatha Crumm =

American comic strip by Bill Hoest

Bill Hoest's Agatha Crumm (July 12, 1981)

Agatha Crumm is a newspaper comic strip created by the cartoonist Bill Hoest (creator of The Lockhorns) and distributed by King Features Syndicate. The strip ran from October 24, 1977, until 1997. Agatha Crumm was Hoest's third strip, following Bumper Snickers (1974).

== Characters and story ==
The strip's title character was the eccentric, miserly, elderly owner of a cookie company. Comics historian Don Markstein described the active and agile Crumm:

Agatha may not have been as wealthy as Scrooge McDuck or Richie Rich, and maybe not even Rich Uncle Pennybags. But as owner of the Crumm Cookie Company, she was probably in the range of Mr. Abernathy, and that's about as wealthy as most toons need to be—even when they're financing a lifestyle that includes a lot of corporate wheeling and dealing. The seven-day comic strip where Agatha was introduced debuted from King Features Syndicate on Monday, October 24, 1977. (A report elsewhere, that she'd begun exactly two months earlier, is apparently in error, as August 24, 1977, was a Wednesday.) She was old enough to rival Uncle Elby or Grandma, but spry, very active in the world of high-finance shenanigans.

== Books ==
Between 1980 and 1983, Signet Books published three Agatha Crumm paperback collections, including The Return of Agatha Crumm (1982).
