= Dave Gantz =

American artist and sculptor (1922–2007)

- Born: December 6, 1922 U.S.
- Died: December 14, 2007 (aged 85)
- Areas: Cartoonist, Sculptor, Children's Book Illustrator
- Notable works: Don Q. Gantz' Glances
- Awards: National Cartoonists Society Newspaper Panel Cartoon Award, 1997

David Gantz (December 6, 1922 – December 14, 2007) was an American artist and sculptor who illustrated children's books and worked as a newspaper cartoonist.

== Biography ==
Gantz graduated from The High School of Music & Art in New York City, the National Academy of Design at Iowa State University.

He penciled and inked comic books in the 1940s and 1950s, working for Timely Comics's humor features like Gandy Goose, Sharpy Fox, Mighty Mouse, Patsy Walker, and Super Rabbit. In the latter half of the 1950s he worked for Gilberton on Classics Illustrated.

From 1950 to 1959, he assisted Charles M. Schulz on scripts for Peanuts.

Beginning in 1975, Gantz co-created the comic strip Don Q., the first strip syndicated by The New York Times Special Features Syndicate. (The other co-creator was Syndicate general manager John Osenenko.) Don Q. was a satirical strip featuring characters from Miguel de Cervantes' Don Quixote, with commentary on contemporary politics and daily life. Don Q. was syndicated until 1981.

Throughout the 1970s and 1980s he illustrated children's books.

Gantz authored the editorial cartoon Gantz' Glances for Newsday from 1997 to 1999; he received the National Cartoonists Society Newspaper Panel Cartoon Award in 1997 for it.

In retirement, Gantz wrote and drew The History of Jews in America, and devoted much of his time to sculpture.

== Bibliography ==
=== Comic strips ===
- Dudley D. (1961–1964; New York Herald-Tribune Syndicate, 1961–1963; Publishers Syndicate, 1963–1964)
- Don Q. (The New York Times Special Features Syndicate, 1975–1981)
- Nancy (United Feature Syndicate, mid-1980s) — 3 months ghosting the strip

=== Books ===
- Wheels Wacker Incomplete Car Catalogue (Scholastic, 1980)
- The History of Jews in America (self-published, 2002)
