= Milk toast =

Breakfast dish

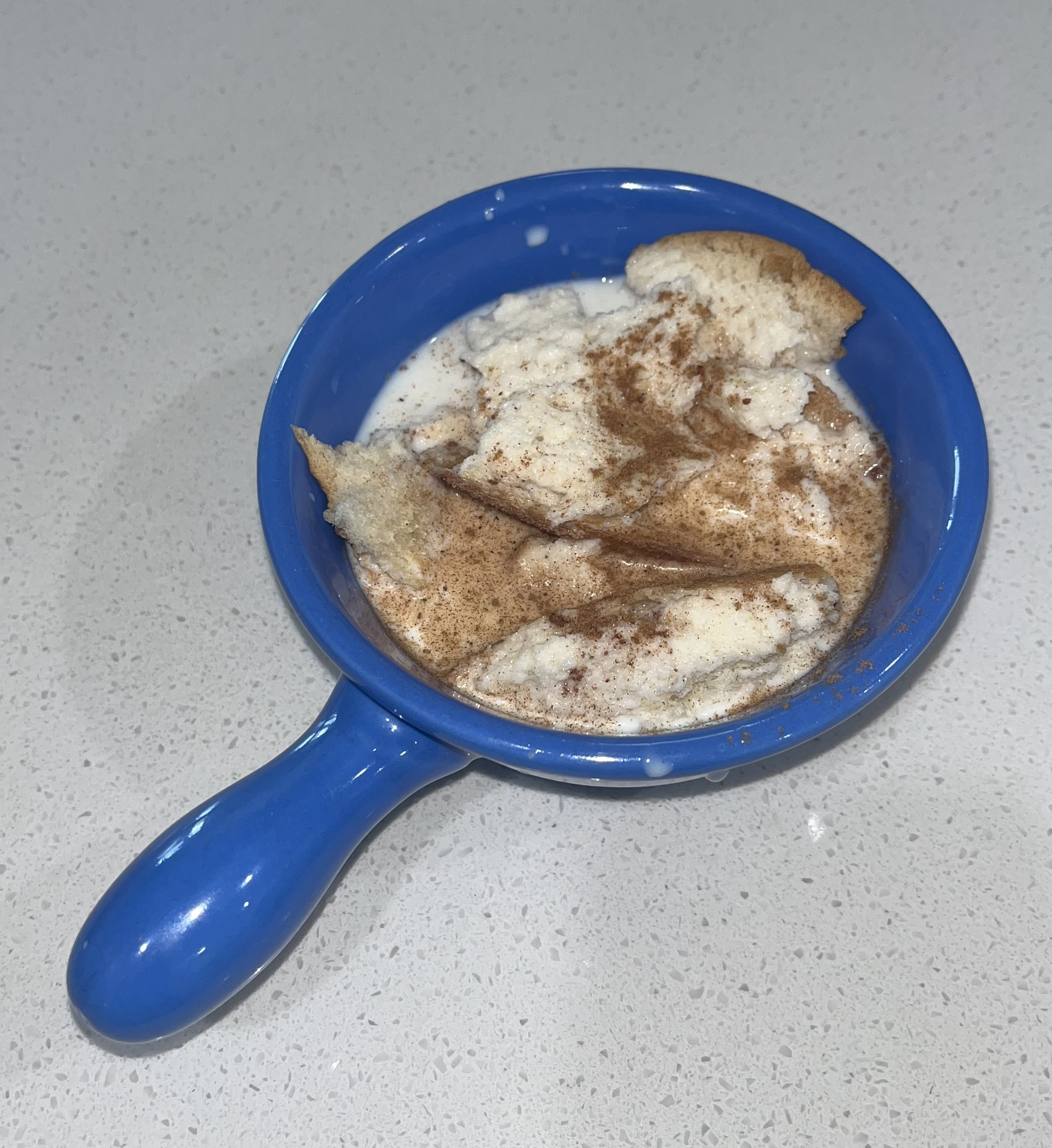
Traditional milktoast

Milk toast is a breakfast dish consisting of toasted bread in warm milk, typically with sugar and butter. Salt, pepper, paprika, cinnamon, cocoa, raisins or other ingredients may be added. In the New England region of the United States, milk toast refers to toast that has been dipped in a milk-based white sauce.

== In New England ==
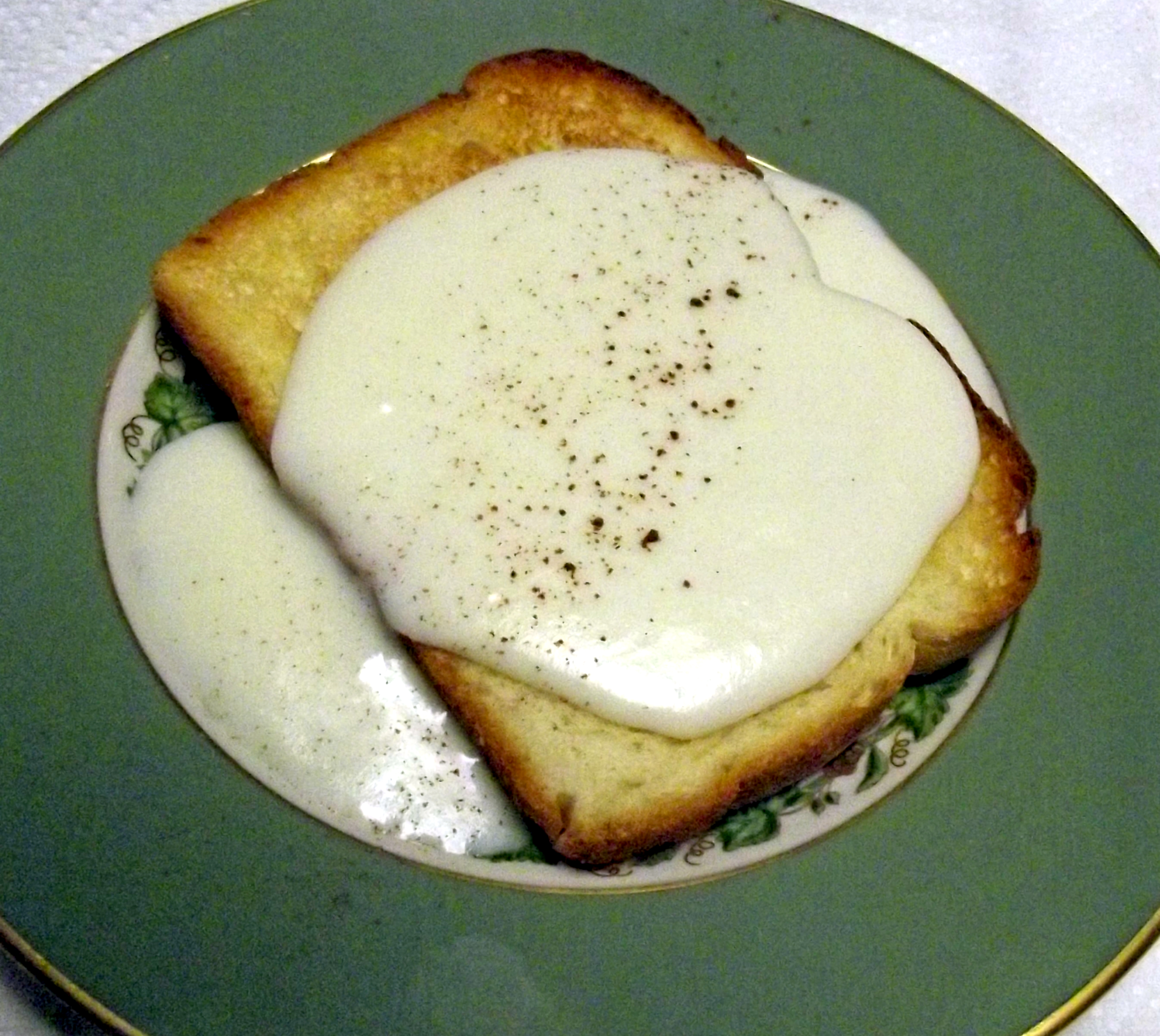
A version of milk toast consisting of toasted buttermilk bread covered in white sauce with a dash of cinnamon

Milk toast was a popular food throughout the late 19th and early 20th centuries, especially for young children and for the convalescent, for whom the dish was thought to be soothing and easy to digest. Although not as popular in the 2000s, milk toast is still considered a comfort food.

Food writer M. F. K. Fisher called milk toast a "warm, mild, soothing thing, full of innocent strength", and wrote, of eating milk toast in a famed restaurant with a convalescent friend, that the dish was "a small modern miracle of gastronomy". She notes that her homeliest kitchen manuals list it under "Feeding The Sick" or "Invalid Recipes", arguing that milk toast was "an instinctive palliative, something like boiled water". Fisher also notes that for true comfort, a ritual may be necessary, and for "Milk Toast people", the dish used may be foolishly important. Her favorite version of milk toast has the milk mixed 50/50 with Campbell's condensed cream of tomato soup in a wide-lipped pitcher called a boccalino, from Italian Switzerland.

== Elsewhere ==
=== Asia ===
Milk toast is a dessert that is served in Asian milk tea cafes. It consists of thick, enriched toasted white bread with condensed milk on top. It is called shahi tukra (Bengali: শাহী টুকরা) in Bangladesh and India and is occasionally served at gatherings. The topping is often infused with cardamom and other spices.

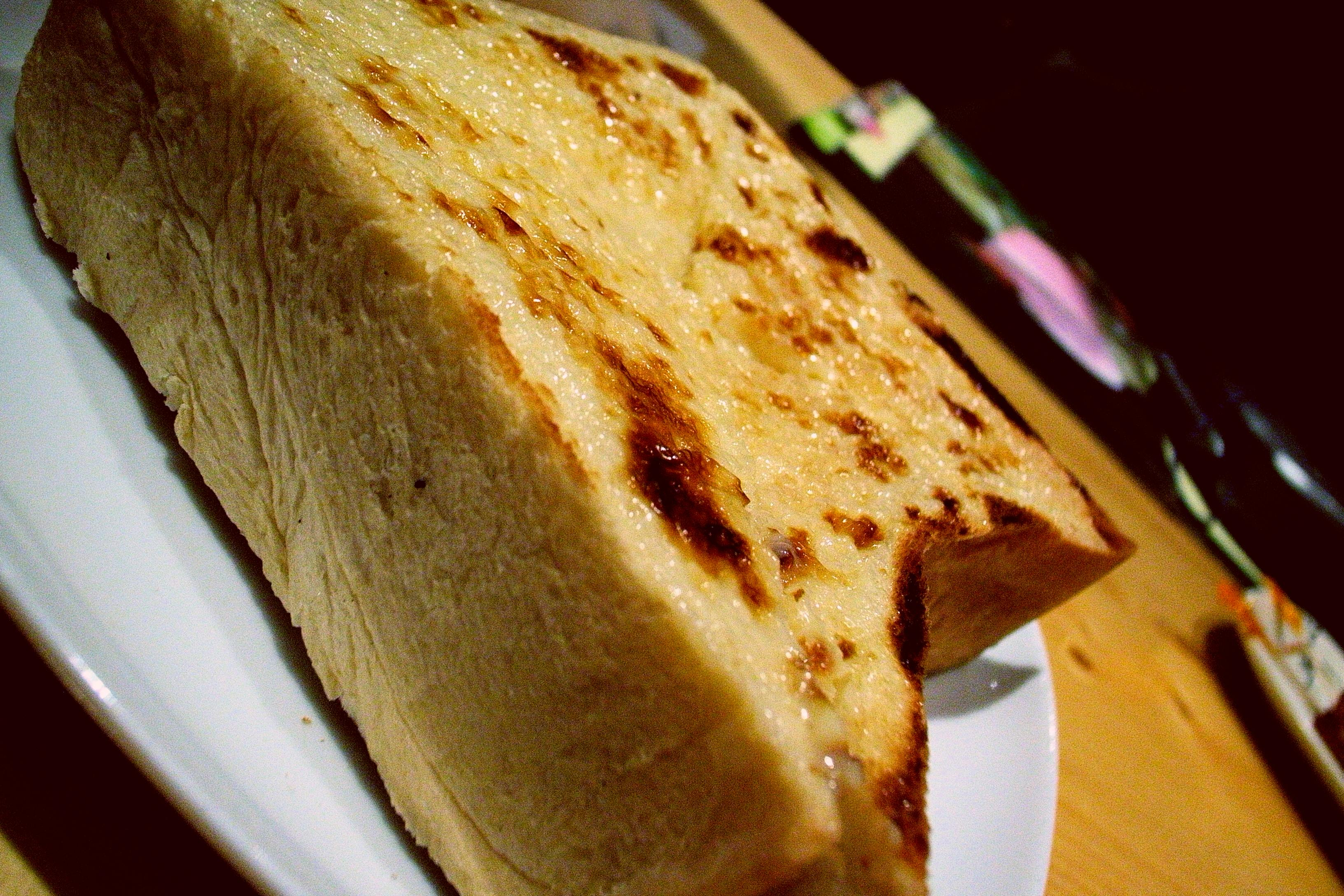
Milk toast prepared with condensed milk

=== Norway and Sweden ===
A traditional Scandinavian dish similar to milk toast is called soll in Norwegian and bryta in Swedish. It consists of broken flatbrød (wafer-thin, crisp bread), tunnbröd or dry bread served in a bowl of cold milk (often filmjölk) and sweetened with sugar. This was an everyday dish for peasants in the countryside, especially served as a simple supper in the evening and was sometimes served as breakfast with warmed milk during the winter.

=== Balkans ===
Popara is a dessert similar to milk toast which can be served at any time of the day. It is often made with fresh warm milk and day-old bread.

== In popular culture ==
Milk toast's soft blandness served as inspiration for the name of the timid and ineffectual comic strip character Caspar Milquetoast, drawn by H. T. Webster from 1924 to 1952. Thus, the term milquetoast entered the language as the label for a timid, shrinking, apologetic person.

== See also ==
- Sop
- Toast water
- Trencher
- Raisin toast
- French toast
- Bread and butter pudding
- List of bread dishes
- List of toast dishes
