= Miss Peach =

American comic strip by Mell Lazarus

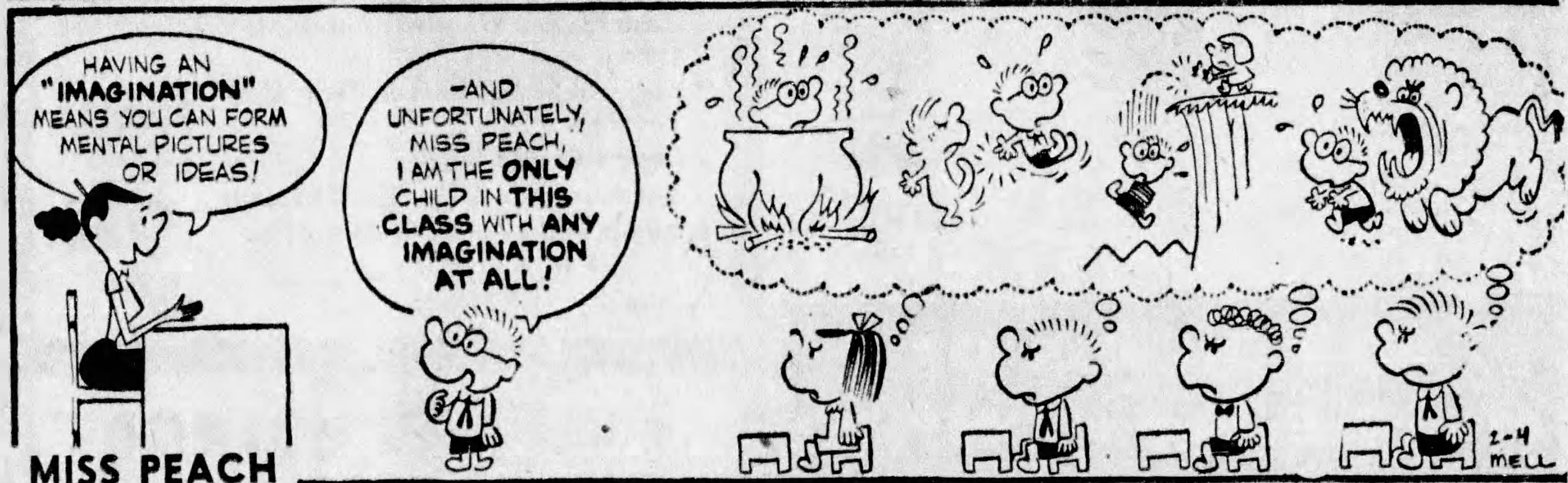
- February 4, 1957
- Author: Mell Lazarus
- Current status/schedule: Daily and Sunday; concluded
- Launch date: February 4, 1957
- End date: September 8, 2002
- Alternate name: Ms. Peach (1990s–2002)
- Syndicate(s): New York Herald Tribune Syndicate; Field Newspaper Syndicate; Creators Syndicate
- Genre(s): humor, adults

Miss Peach was a syndicated comic strip created by American cartoonist Mell Lazarus. It ran for 45 years, from February 4, 1957, to September 8, 2002.

== Format and style ==
The daily strips often contained only a single panel. The format was "gag-a-day". The drawing was stylized: the children had tiny bodies and large heads with flounder faces (both eyes on the same side of the nose).

== Publication history ==
The strip came into being because of a United Features Syndicate talent search contest for new comic strips. Lazarus recalled, "I scanned the papers, and there was nothing about schools, so I invented Miss Peach." Although he did not win the United Features contest, Miss Peach was launched in the New York Herald Tribune and eventually was published internationally in 300 newspapers.

In the 1990s, the title was changed to the more modern Ms. Peach. For health reasons, Lazarus stopped drawing the strip in August 2002; the last ran on September 8. His other strip, Momma, ran until 2016 due to Lazarus' death that year.

== Characters and story ==
The strip was set in Kelly School, named after Pogo cartoonist Walt Kelly. In the summer, the scene usually shifted to a summer camp, Kamp Kelly.

- Miss Peach, the main teacher, sweet and good natured, beloved by her students, although she can be firm.
- Ms. Crystal, the octogenarian kindergarten teacher. She would sometimes ask Francine to watch her young charges.
- Mr. J. W. Grimmis, pompous and somewhat grouchy principal
- Mr. Musselman, gym teacher
- Miss Peach's students, Marcia Mason, Ira Brom, Arthur Strimm, Francine, Freddy Foster, Lester Larson, Linda, Walter, Stuart, Sheila, Farley, and Desdemona

In 1964, Lazarus commented, "The characters in Miss Peach are not actually modeled on real persons, with the possible exception of Lester, the skinny kid in the strip. Possibly the most loved character is Arthur, the dopey little kid."

Comics historian Don Markstein observed:

Her students, Arthur, Ira, Marcia and several others, tended to be hip, wisecracking types rather than typical media kids from before the 1950s. Another frequently seen supporting character was Miss Crystal, who was in her 80s and still teaching at Kelly. The strip was a success from the start, and quickly began generating paperback reprints. There were also a couple of comic books. Dell put out an issue in 1963, written and drawn not by Lazarus, but by Jack Mendelsohn (Jackys Diary). Six years later, Lazarus did a comic book special, Miss Peach Tells You How to Grow. Lazarus, a staunch supporter of creators' rights, later moved from the Herald-Tribune to Creators Syndicate (Baby Blues, Crankshaft).

== Controversy ==
The November 29, 1963, episode was pulled from syndication because one of the characters fantasized about saving the President of the United States' life—one week after John F. Kennedy was assassinated. Cartoonists prepare their strips many weeks before publication.

== In other media ==
In 1971, Miss Peach was adapted as an animated segment for the television series Curiosity Shop.

From 1982, several television movies were based on the strip: Miss Peach of the Kelly School featured Deborah Grover as Miss Peach and puppets as the children (some voiced by Martin Short). These focused on special holidays, notably Thanksgiving and Valentine's Day.
