= Caspar Milquetoast =

Comic strip character

The Timid Soul
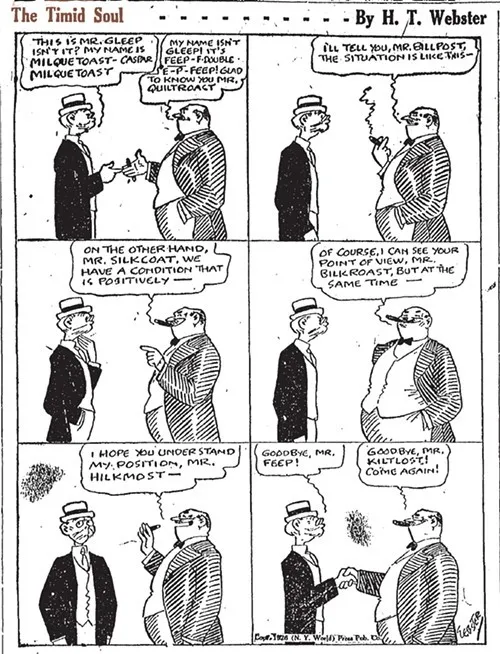
- Milquetoast in Webster's The Timid Soul (Boston Daily Globe, January 13, 1926)
- Author: H. T. Webster; Herb Roth (1953)
- Current status/schedule: Concluded daily panel
- Launch date: 1924
- End date: April 4, 1953
- Alternate name: Caspar Milquetoast
- Syndicate(s): World Feature Service (c. 1925–1931); New York Herald Tribune Syndicate (1931–1953)
- Genre: Humor

Caspar Milquetoast is a fictional character created by H. T. Webster for his comic strip The Timid Soul. Webster described Caspar Milquetoast as "the man who speaks softly and gets hit with a big stick". The character's name is derived from a bland and fairly inoffensive food, milk toast, which, light and easy to digest, is an appropriate food for someone with a weak or "nervous" stomach.

== History ==
In 1912, Webster drew a daily panel for the New-York Tribune, under a variety of titles—Our Boyhood Ambitions, Life's Darkest Moment, The Unseen Audience. In 1924, Webster moved to the New York World and soon after added The Timid Soul featuring the wimpy Caspar Milquetoast. Milquetoast developed out of the design of another character, Egbert Smear, or The Man in the Brown Derby. The character was said to have ushered in a new era of timidity in comics.

In 1927, Webster trained himself to draw left-handed in three months after a severe case of arthritis impaired the use of his right hand. In 1931, the World folded, and that same year, Simon & Schuster published a collection of The Timid Soul reprints. Webster then went back to the Tribune (now known as the New York Herald Tribune), where he launched a Timid Soul Sunday strip. He alternated his various features throughout the week: Caspar Milquetoast was seen on both Sunday and Monday. The character was featured in books, film, radio programs and vaudeville acts. Webster continued to produce this syndicated panel until his death in 1952, after which his assistant Herb Roth carried it on for another year.

The Timid Soul also appeared in the Oakland Tribune. Strips by Webster had been appearing in the Tribune since June 1922 with The Man in the Brown Derby part of the Sunday comics since 14 October 1923. The Timid Soul first appeared on 26 March 1924 but it was not until 9 June, nine strips later, that Caspar introduces himself as Mr Milquetoast. His first name, Caspar and his wife’s name, Carrie, were revealed in the third strip on 9 April.

In November 1945, Webster was featured on the cover of Time magazine. The accompanying article said, "millions of Americans know Caspar Milquetoast as well as they know Tom Sawyer and Andrew Jackson, better than they know George F. Babbitt, and any amount better than they know such world figures as Mr. Micawber and Don Quixote. They know him, in fact, almost as well as they know their own weaknesses."

== Radio ==
The comic strip was also the basis for a short-lived radio series, also titled The Timid Soul. The series featured Billy Lynn as Caspar Milquetoast, with Cecil Roy as his wife, Madge. The show ran on Mutual Radio from October 12, 1941 to March 15, 1942.

== Television adaptation ==
On June 22, 1949, the DuMont Television Network adapted The Timid Soul to television as the premiere presentation of its anthology series Program Playhouse. Caspar Milquetoast in that episode, now lost, was portrayed by Ernest Truex.

== Legacy ==
Because of the popularity of Webster's character, the term milquetoast came into general usage in American English to mean "weak and ineffectual". When the term is used to describe a person, it typically indicates someone of an unusually meek, bland, soft, or submissive nature, who is easily overlooked, written off, and who may also appear overly sensitive, timid, indecisive or cowardly. Milquetoast appears in most American English dictionaries, but is not in many other English dictionaries.

== See also ==
- Clark Kent
- Walter Mitty
- The Piano Has Been Drinking (Not Me) (An Evening with Pete King)
- J. Wellington Wimpy
