= Howard Huge =

Weekly cartoon series

Bunny Hoest and John Reiner's Howard Huge

Howard Huge is a cartoon series written by Bunny Hoest and illustrated by John Reiner. Created by Bill Hoest, the series had 80 million readers, since it ran in the Sunday supplement magazine, Parade from 1980 to 2007, continuing on a website.

== Characters and story ==
The single-panel cartoons feature Howard Huge, an enormous but lovable dog, his family and neighborhood kids. His name was a play on Howard Hughes. Karen L. Miller, writing in the Reading Eagle (October 9, 1983), described the dog:

Howard is a pleasant, likable Saint Bernard, who by his very size, gets in the way of the family he lives with, and sometimes, Howard even gets in his own way. He envelops the sofa just by sitting on it. He bathes guests when he only means to show his affection. He befriends animals and almost kills them. Yes. Howard is a friend to man and beast alike; the only thing is nobody knows it... Howard's humorous experiences show us family life at its funniest.

According to Bunny Hoest, the character was based on a real pet acquired when the family was looking for a Labrador Retriever as a companion to an aging black Lab. The kennel was vibrant with lively Labrador puppies, but a quiet, little animal was alone in a small cage. When they took the furry, disheveled dog out for a stretch, he tried his paws and immediately sprawled on his belly.

The kennel owner speculated that the dog had been sent to the wrong kennel (where he remained unwanted) and had been taken from his mother too soon in the breeder's haste to find a Christmas buyer. The family was appalled, and with something less than enthusiasm, they kept looking at the playful Labrador puppies. But the littlest girl held the disheveled dog on her shoulder, where he promptly fell asleep. Without being able to come to a decision, the family started to leave and told her to put the dog back. The good-natured animal kissed her face and lay quietly alone. The family was captivated.

This good-natured, placid puppy was a Saint Bernard who eventually became an enormous, loyal and lovable member of the family for the next 13 years. Howard Huge is based on that Saint Bernard.

== Books ==
The collection, Howard Huge, was published by Ballantine Books in 1982. Bunny Hoest did the character as a children's book, Howard Huge Comes to Stay, published by Random House Books for Young Readers in 1992.

== Television ==
Howard Huge was mentioned in an episode of Family Guy. It was in Season 7, Episode 11, Not All Dogs Go to Heaven.
