= Parade (magazine) =

American magazine turned website (founded 1941)

- September 6, 2009, issue
- Editor: Anne Krueger
- Frequency: Weekly (Sundays)
- Circulation: 32 million (formerly)
- Publisher: The Arena Group
- Founder: Marshall Field III
- Founded: 1941; 85 years ago
- First issue: May 31, 1941
- Final issue: November 13, 2022 (printed); December 31, 2023 (e-edition)
- Company: Parade Media
- Country: United States
- Website: parade.com
- ISSN: 1839-6569
- OCLC: 1772138

Parade is an American nationwide Sunday newspaper magazine, distributed in more than 700 newspapers nationwide in the United States until 2022. The most widely read magazine in the U.S., Parade had a circulation of 32 million and a readership of 54.1 million. Anne Krueger had been the magazine's editor since 2015.

The November 13, 2022, issue was the final edition printed and inserted in newspapers nationwide, but Parade continued as an e-magazine on newspaper websites. The December 31, 2023, edition was the final e-magazine edition. It now operates solely on their website.

== Company history ==
The magazine was founded by Marshall Field department store heir Marshall Field III in 1941, with the first issue published May 31 as Parade: The Weekly Picture Newspaper for 5 cents per copy. It sold 125,000 copies that year. In early 1946, Field recruited Arthur Harrison Motley, then-publisher of The American Magazine, to be Parade's new publisher. At the time, Parade had a print circulation of approximately 2.1 million; by October of that year, circulation had grown to over 3.6 million, and by 1960, it had reached nearly 10 million, with the magazine's gross revenue having grown from $1.8M (in 1946 dollars) to $25M (in 1960 dollars).

John Hay Whitney, publisher of the New York Herald Tribune, bought Parade in 1958, on the condition that Motley remain as publisher for at least five more years. Booth Newspapers purchased it in 1973. Booth was purchased by Advance Publications in 1976, and Parade became a separate operating unit within Advance.

In 2014, Athlon Media Group (later called AMG/Parade and now known as Parade Media) purchased it from Advance Publications. In 2022, The Arena Group (formerly The Maven), which also operates Sports Illustrated, TheStreet and numerous other brands, bought Parade from Athlon for $16 million as a mix of cash and equity.

== Publishing schedule ==
Beginning on the weekend of December 28, 2019, Parade changed its publishing schedule to skip up to six weekends a year, planning to publish combined holiday issues. The first such combined publication was a Christmas-themed issue published the weekend of December 21, 2019. The magazine published the weekend of April 4, 2020, also covered the weekend of April 11; Easter was April 12. No magazine was published on the weekend of May 2, 2020, due to the COVID-19 pandemic. The magazine published the weekend of May 16 also covered the weekend of May 23; Memorial Day was May 25. The magazine published the weekend of June 27 also covered the weekend of July 4, Independence Day. The magazine published the weekend of August 29 also covered the weekend of September 5; Labor Day was September 7. The magazine published the weekend of December 19 also covered the weekend of December 26. In 2021, the magazine was not scheduled to be published the weekends of April 3, May 29, July 3, July 31, September 4 or December 25.

In September 2022, The Arena Group announced that Parade would end print publication in November, but would continue in its online incarnation. The final printed edition, initially planned for November 6, ran November 13, 2022. The final e-edition ran December 31, 2023.

Parade now exists as a website and an emailed newsletter edition for those who sign up for it.

=== Distribution ===
Throughout 2016, Gannett Company, which had produced USA Weekend, the most direct competitor to Parade until its December 2014 discontinuation, added Parade to many of its Sunday newspapers as a replacement.

Parade Digital Partners is a distribution network that includes the website Parade.com and more than 700 of the magazine's partner newspaper websites. Parade Digital Partners has a reach of more than 30 million monthly unique visitors (comScore Q1 2014).

== Features ==
The magazine typically has one main feature article, often a smaller feature article, and a number of regular columns. There is also advertising for consumer products, sometimes in the print edition appearing with clippable coupons or tear-off business reply cards.

- "Ask Marilyn" by Marilyn vos Savant: Vos Savant answers questions from readers, from brainteasers to explanations of illogical customs, advice, or legitimate philosophical questions. Occasionally she will pose a brainteaser of her own or poll her readers.
- Cartoon Parade: Panel cartoons by various creators, including Dave Coverly, Carla Ventresca, Dan Piraro, and Gary McCoy. By 2016, due to the expense and lack of interest, these had been dropped.
- "In Step With" by James Brady: Celebrity interview column which ceased after Brady's 2009 death.
- "Intelligence Report": A guide to health, life, money, entertainment, and more
- Interviews have included such celebrities as Steve Carell, Jimmy Fallon, Katharine McPhee, Katy Perry and Noah Wyle.
- Laugh Parade: Gag cartoons by Bunny Hoest and John Reiner
- "Numbrix": Also by Marilyn vos Savant, Numbrix is a simple puzzle game in which the reader arranges the numbers 1 to 81 in a continuous path that fits into a 9×9 square grid. Numbrix was introduced in July 2008 (originally as a 7×7 puzzle). In addition to the weekly print version, vos Savant also produces daily Numbrix puzzles for Parade's Web site. Since 2014, Parade's site has also published a much more difficult variant, "Jadium" (formerly "Snakepit"), by Jeff Marchant.
- "Our Towns" is a regular feature written by journalists from Parade newspaper partners.
- "The Parade High School All-America Teams": This sports franchise honors as All-Americans the best U.S. high school athletes in boys and girls basketball, football, and boys and girls soccer. Parade began its series in 1957 with its boys basketball honors, and expanded to football six years later. Girls basketball was added in 1977, boys soccer in 1979, and girls soccer in 1993. In 2010, Parade introduced its All-America Service Team, which honors high-school students for commitment to service and volunteerism.
- "Walter Scott's Personality Parade" by Walter Scott (a pseudonym, originally used by Lloyd Shearer and now by a rotating group of edit staffers): In Q&A sessions, celebrities often discuss some project or movie which is just about to be released.
- "Views," an editorial column by various authors, including CNN political analyst David Gergen and Pulitzer Prize–winning journalist Connie Schultz.
- "Keeping Up with Youth" (1960–70s)
- "Fresh Voices": A former column where teenage readers would give their opinions on a different topic. Daria, from the MTV series of the same name, would frequently appear among them, giving a sarcastic opinion.

== Special editions ==
- "What People Earn", an annual, typically early spring
- "Where America Lives" is an ongoing thematic feature
- "What America Eats" is presented seasonally throughout the year
- "The Giving Issue" is typically in the Sunday of Thanksgiving weekend

== Publishing lag time ==
The magazine had a lag time to publication of about ten days, which occasionally caused the magazine to print statements that were out of date by the time Parade was publicly available in a weekend newspaper.

The January 6, 2008, edition cover and main article asked whether Benazir Bhutto was "America's best hope against Al-Qaeda," but on December 27, 2007, she had been assassinated. Readers and media complained the magazine had an additional week of lag time due to the holiday season.

A similar incident occurred in the February 11, 2007, issue when Walter Scott's "Personality Parade" reported that Barbaro, an American thoroughbred racehorse and winner of the 2006 Kentucky Derby, was in a stable condition. Barbaro had been euthanized thirteen days earlier, on January 29, 2007.
