= Bunny Hoest =

Comic strip writer (b. 1932)

- Born: Madeline Mezz; 1932 (age 93–94) Brooklyn, New York, U.S.
- Area: Writer
- Pseudonym: The Cartoon Lady
- Notable works: The Lockhorns; Laugh Parade; Howard Huge
- Collaborators: Bill Hoest; John Reiner
- Spouses: Ted Jungreis (m. 1951; div. 1972) Bill Hoest (m. 1973; died 1988) Dr. Walter T. Carpenter, Jr. (m. 1996; died 2008)

Bunny Hoest (born 1932), sometimes labeled The Cartoon Lady, is the writer of several comic strips, including The Lockhorns, Laugh Parade, and Howard Huge, the first of which she inherited from her late husband Bill Hoest. She is the co-creator of Bumper Snickers in 1974, Agatha Crumm in 1977, Laugh Parade in 1980, Howard Huge in 1981, What A Guy! in 1986, and Hunny Bunny's Short Tales in 1992.

== Biography ==
=== Early life and education ===
Born in Crown Heights, Brooklyn, as Madeline Mezz, she was the only child of a doctor and an opera singer. She received the nickname "Bunny" as a child, as she recalled, "My mother and father called me Bunny from day one. They said I was little and cute and had dark eyes like a little bunny." Her father, Dr. David Mezz, was a surgeon who invented the nose clip used by swimmers and divers.

After attending a magnet school as a music student for four years, she graduated in 1953 from Adelphi University, where she studied literature and creative writing, noting, “I feel that writing is a gift which should be perfected. English is a beautiful language. Why muck it up?”

=== First marriage ===
When she was 19, she married Ted Jungreis, and the couple moved to Huntington, Long Island, where she raised three children. With a master's degree in secondary education from C. W. Post, she taught English as a second language. She joined a local community theater, where she composed original scores for three musical comedies, in addition to singing, dancing, and directing the music in productions of Gypsy, Damn Yankees, Guys and Dolls, South Pacific, and other musical comedies. During this time, she also became a member of the Huntington Choral Society.

=== Comic strip career and second marriage ===
Mezz and Jungreis separated after 21 years together, and not long after that, she landed a job with cartoonist Bill Hoest, creator of The Lockhorns, who needed an assistant to help compile his cartoons into books. She recalled, "I was 40 years old. My kids were 20, 18, and 15." Hoest, who had six children, was also recently divorced.

The two married in 1973. She reflected, "Marrying Bill meant taking on a whole different kind of life, a new direction with much responsibility. He needed a working partner as well as a marriage partner. It was scary and challenging. I thought, what the hell, I'll give it a shot."

Soon she was writing captions for The Lockhorns, and eventually they worked together on the scripts for their other features. After Bill Hoest's death in 1988, she continued the cartoons and strips, working closely with illustrator John Reiner, who began as Bill Hoest's assistant in 1986. They usually work three or four months in advance of publication.

In 2001, Marcelle S. Fischer, in The New York Times, profiled Long Island's cartoonists, including Bunny Hoest:

Bunny Hoest writes the snappy one-liners for The Lockhorns, a cartoon panel about a bickering long-married couple that appears in 500 newspapers. "Be careful," Ms. Hoest said. "I'm just writing what I see. It's based on observation." Ms. Hoest's strip is drawn by John Reiner, who took over when her husband, the artist Bill Hoest, got cancer in 1986. He died in 1988. Some comics are done by teams: writers create the dialogue and storyline; illustrators sketch the panels and strips in pencil. Inkers retrace the drawing. Then the lettering is done.

According to King Features, Bunny Hoest had 200 million readers each week, a total derived from The Lockhorns (500 newspapers worldwide), Laugh Parade (80 million readers each Sunday) and the long-running Bumper Snickers for The National Enquirer (which has a circulation of more than seven million). Bumper Snickers began in 1974 and was collected in a Signet paperback two years later.

Hoest produced Hunny Bunny’s Short Tales with Adrian Sinnott and Sharon Bowers (her daughter), a feature of illustrated one-minute bedtime stories for children. Syndicated by King Features in the mid-to- late 1990s, the feature was one of the first panel cartoons delivered electronically.

Microsoft Network picked up "The Lockhorns" in 2019. They are currently being produced digitally worldwide.

== Personal life ==
Bunny Hoest has been married three times. In 1996, she met and married her third husband, Dr. Walter T. Carpenter, Jr. He died on October 23, 2008, at the age of 97.

She still lives on Long Island, sings with the Huntington Choral Society, and produces "The Lockhorns" daily and Sunday.
