= H. T. Webster =

American cartoonist (1885–1952)

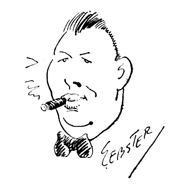
- 1919 self-portrait for The Literary Digest
- Born: Harold Tucker Webster; September 21, 1885 Parkersburg, West Virginia, U.S.
- Died: September 22, 1952 (aged 67)
- Area: Cartoonist
- Pseudonyms: Webster; Webby
- Notable works: The Timid Soul (Caspar Milquetoast)
- Spouse: Ethel Worts (m. 1916)

Harold Tucker Webster (September 21, 1885 – September 22, 1952) was an American cartoonist known for The Timid Soul, Bridge, Life's Darkest Moments and others in his syndicated series which ran from the 1920s into the 1950s. Because he disliked his given name, his readers knew him as H. T. Webster, and his signature was simply Webster. His friends, however, called him Webby.

Because of the humor and human interest in his cartoons, he was sometimes compared to Mark Twain, and his art style was quite similar to the work of Clare Briggs. During his lifetime, Webster drew more than 16,000 single-panel cartoons.

== Biography ==
Born in Parkersburg, West Virginia, in 1885, Webster grew up in the small city (pop. 3,365) of Tomahawk, Wisconsin, where his father was a druggist. He began drawing at age seven. When he was 12, he switched from cigarettes to cigars, and that same year he sold his first cartoon for $5 to the magazine Recreation.

He studied drawing from a correspondence course when he was 15, and two years later, he left high school and Tomahawk to study in Chicago at the Frank Holmes School of Illustration, where cartoonist Harry Hershfield had also studied. However, the Holmes School closed only a few weeks after Webster's arrival, bringing an end to his formal art training. With little success as a freelance artist, Webster began a salaried job with the Denver Republican, moving to the rival Denver Post when he was offered $15 a week as a sports cartoonist. Webster commented, "If they had known it, they could have got me for $1.50".

He returned to Chicago, where he spent three years drawing front-page political cartoons for the Chicago Inter Ocean, prompting one politician to introduce a bill in the state legislature forbidding unflattering cartoons. After two years with The Cincinnati Post, he had enough saved to spend a year traveling around the world. Returning from China, he joined the New York Tribune in 1912. He married Ethel Worts on August 2, 1916, two weeks after he met her.

In 1952, Webster suffered a heart attack while on a train that was just arriving in Stamford, Connecticut; he died shortly thereafter.

== Caspar Milquetoast ==
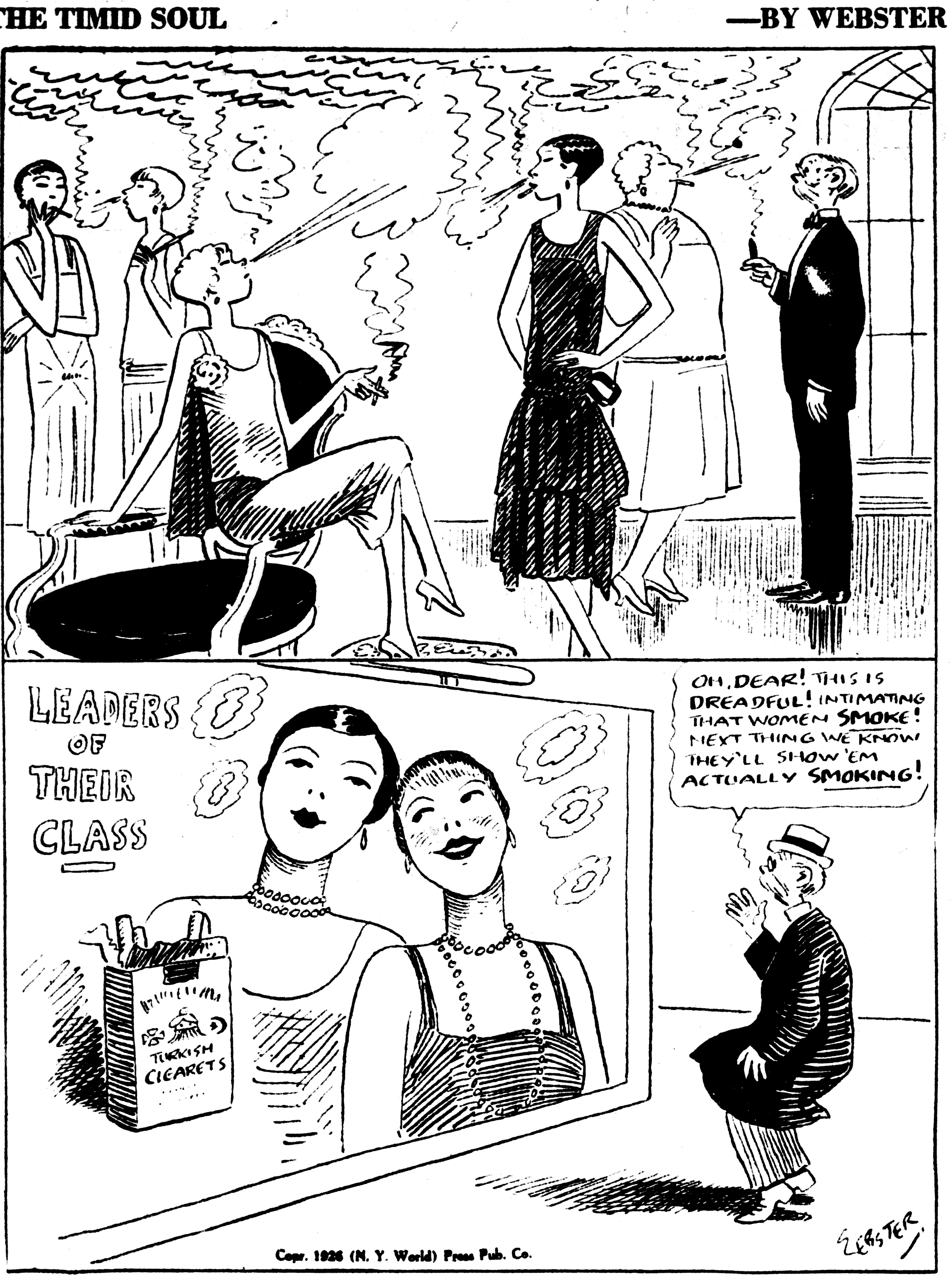
Webster's The Timid Soul from November 29, 1926

The titles of Webster's cartoons reflected the different situations, as in Our Boyhood Ambitions and Bridge. In 1924, he moved to the New York World and soon after added The Timid Soul featuring Caspar Milquetoast, a wimpy character whose name is derived from milk toast. Webster described Caspar Milquetoast as "the man who speaks softly and gets hit with a big stick". The modern dictionary definition of milquetoast (meaning a very shy or retiring person) comes from Webster's cartoons.

In 1927 Webster trained himself to draw left-handed in three months after a severe case of arthritis impaired the use of his right hand. In 1931, the World folded, and that same year, Simon & Schuster published a collection of The Timid Soul reprints. Webster then went back to the New York Tribune (now known as the New York Herald Tribune), where he then launched a Timid Soul Sunday strip. He alternated his various features throughout the week: Caspar Milquetoast was seen on both Sunday and Monday. Youth's glories (The Thrill That Comes Once in a Lifetime) and the downside (Life's Darkest Moment) appeared on Saturdays and Tuesdays. On Wednesday, The Unseen Audience offered satirical jabs at radio. How to Torture Your Husband (or Wife) was published each Thursday, and the week ended with Bridge on Fridays.

During the 1940s, Webster lived at Shippan Point in Stamford, Connecticut. His assistant, Herb Roth, took over when Webster died in 1952. When Roth died the following year, the series came to an end with the last new drawing appearing in the New York Herald Tribune on April 4, 1953.

== Cartoon automation reference ==
A cartoon published in a 1923 issue of New York World appears to depict a hypothetical machine which some suggest to be a prediction of AI-powered art generators by the year 2023.

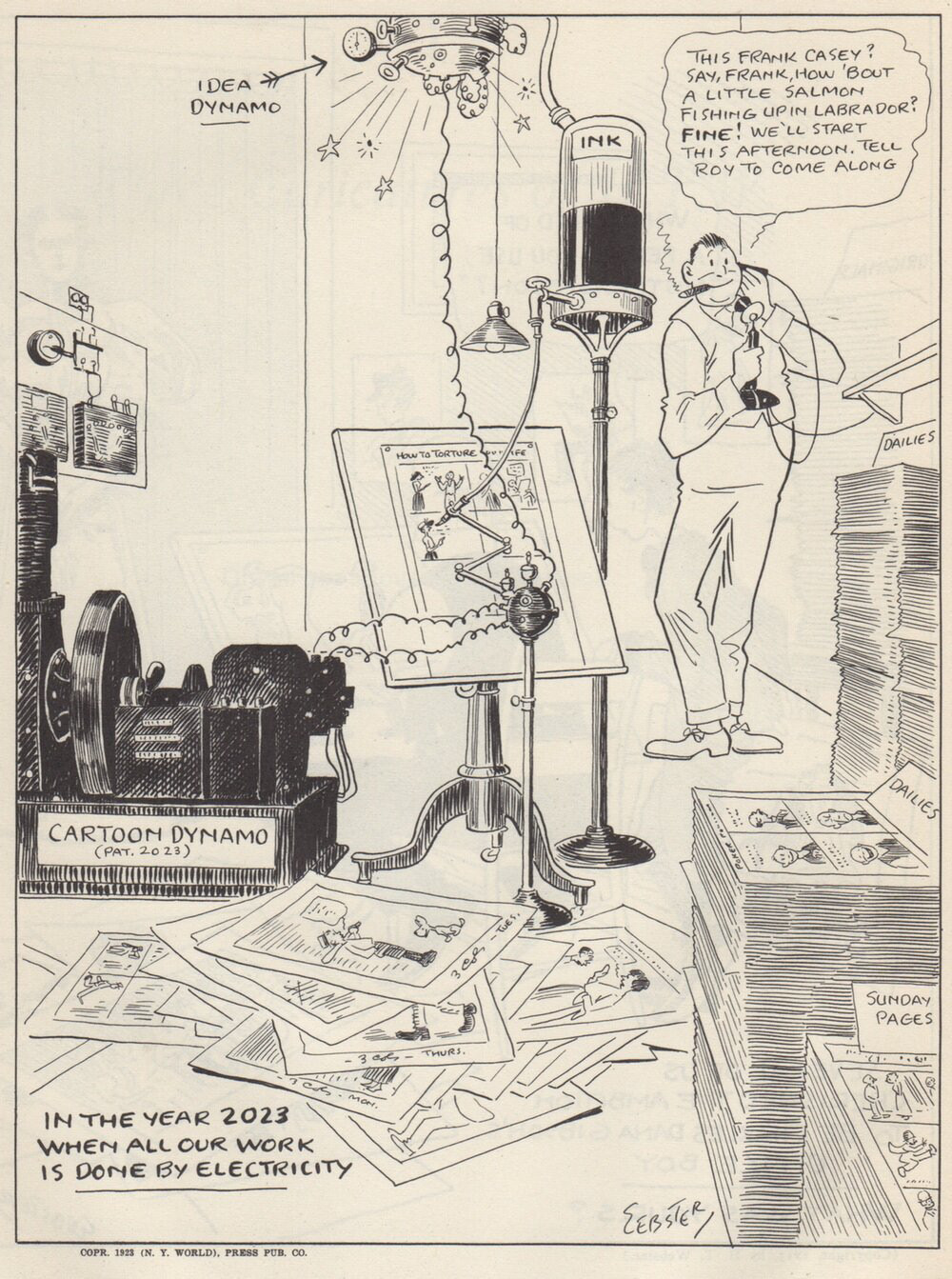
1923 cartoon by H. T. Webster, joking about 2023 when electric machines can create art so that the artist can rest

== Television ==
On June 22, 1949, the DuMont Television Network adapted The Timid Soul to television as the premiere presentation of their Program Playhouse series. Caspar Milquetoast was portrayed by Ernest Truex.

== Bibliography ==
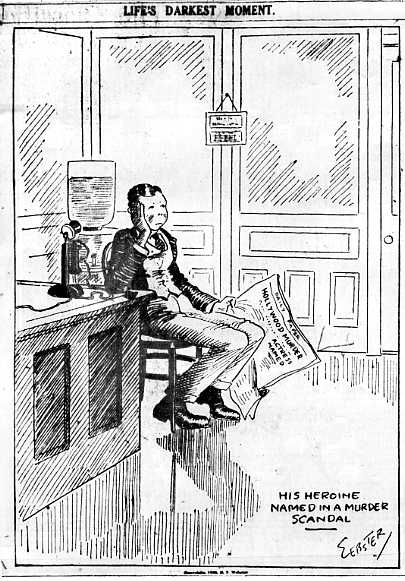
H. T. Webster drew this 1922 cartoon shortly after the William Desmond Taylor murder.

- Our Boyhood Thrills and Other Cartoons (1915)
- Boys and Folks (1917)
- Webster's Bridge with William Johnston (1924)
- Webster's Poker Book (1926)
- The Timid Soul (1931)
- The Culberston-Webster Contract System with Ely Culbertson (1932)
- Webster Unabridged (1945)
- To Hell with Fishing (1945)
- Who Dealt This Mess (1948)
- How to Torture Your Husband (1948)
- How to Torture Your Wife (1948)
- Life with Rover (1949)
- The Best of H. T. Webster, a Memorial Collection, foreword by Robert E. Sherwood (Simon & Schuster, 1953)
