= Mell Lazarus =

Syndicated cartoonist (1927–2016)

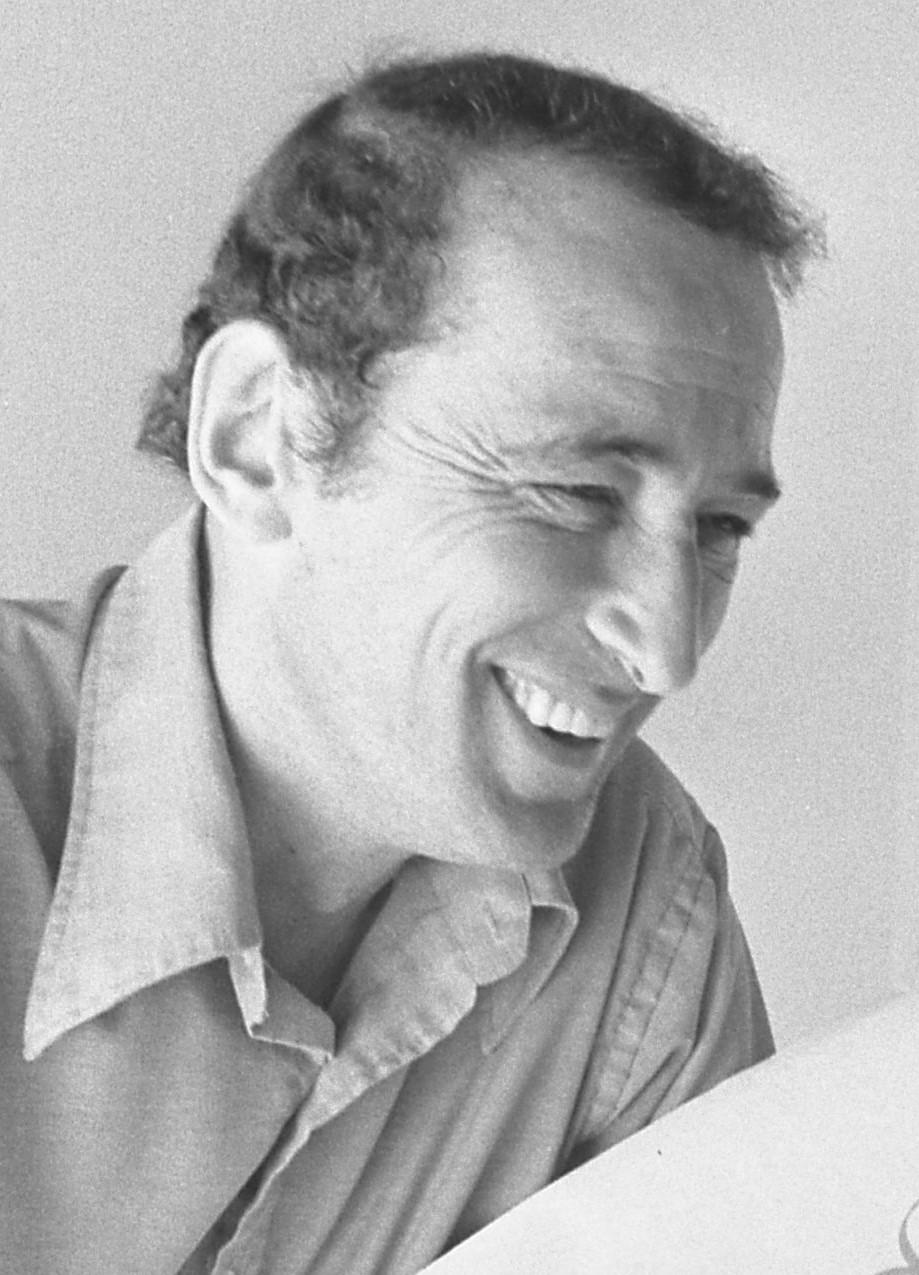
- Lazarus in 1973
- Born: Melvin Lazarus; May 3, 1927 Brooklyn, New York, U.S.
- Died: May 24, 2016 (aged 89) Los Angeles, California, U.S.
- Areas: Cartoonist, Novelist
- Pseudonym: Fulton
- Notable works: Miss Peach; Momma
- Awards: Reuben Award (1981); Inkpot Award (1976)
- Spouse: Sally Mitchell
- Children: Margie, Suesan, Cathie

Melvin Lazarus (May 3, 1927 – May 24, 2016) was an American cartoonist, best known as the creator of two comic strips, Miss Peach (1957–2002) and Momma (1970–2016). Additionally, he wrote two novels. For his comic strip Pauline McPeril (a 1966-69 collaboration with Jack Rickard), he used the pseudonym Fulton, which is also the name of a character in his first novel, The Boss Is Crazy, Too.

== Biography ==
Lazarus was born in Brooklyn, to Sydney Lazarus, a successful glass-blower, and Frances (née Mushkin) Lazarus, nicknamed Frankie. Lazarus, who dropped out of high school, published his first cartoon at 16, and later enlisted in the U.S. Navy.

During his twenties, he worked for Al Capp and his brother Elliott Caplin at the Capp family-owned Toby Press. In the mid-1950s, he created two children's syndicated comic strips for General Features, Wee Women and Li'l Ones.

Miss Peach debuted on February 4, 1957, in the New York Herald Tribune, and ended up running for nearly 50 years.

His comic strip Momma debuted on October 26, 1970. Although Lazarus based the title character on his own mother, she believed the character was based on his aunt, exclaiming, "You caught Aunt Helen to a tee!"

In 1964, Lazarus talked about his background and working methods:

I never actually graduated high school. My art teacher flunked me. I have since, however, attended many classes of one kind or another. I frequently lecture at colleges and to other groups around the country. I sold my first cartoon when I was 16. I did commercial art and edited children's magazines prior to February 4, 1957 when my comic, Miss Peach, was launched. The characters in Miss Peach are not actually modeled on real persons, with the possible exception of Lester, the skinny kid in the strip. Possibly the most loved character is Arthur, the dopey little kid. I make notes all week based on thoughts, conversational fragments, etc. I sift through all these notes on Monday mornings and select several to develop. I then write gags for them. I do six daily strips and a Sunday page.

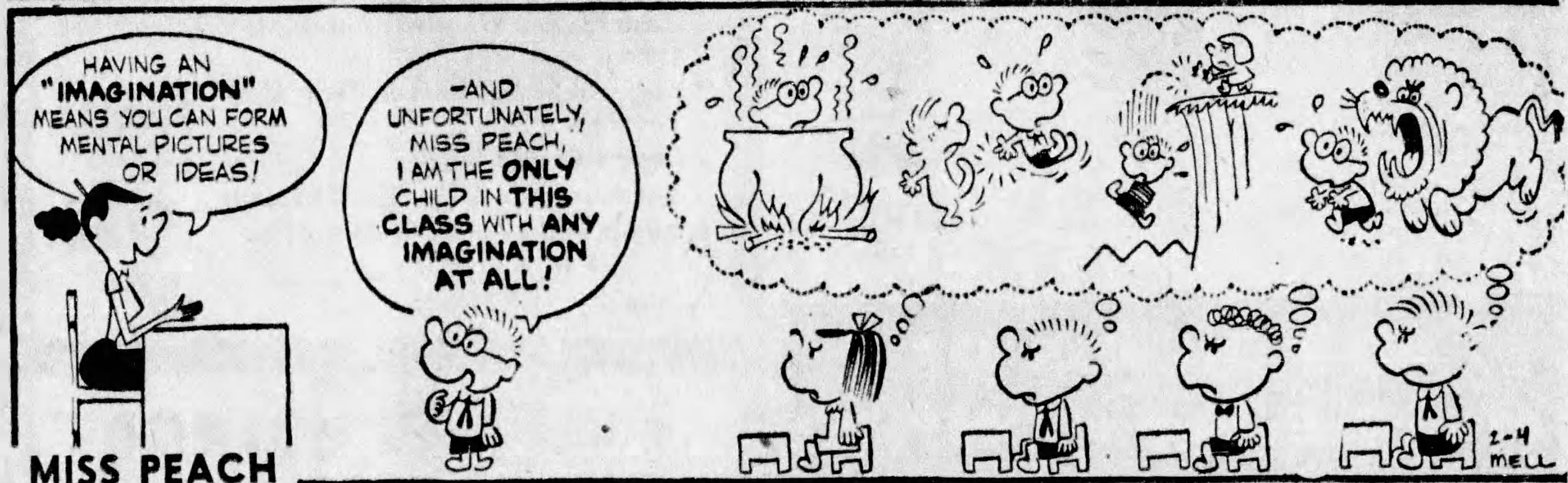
Mell Lazarus' Miss Peach on February 4, 1957

Lazarus served as president of the National Cartoonists Society for two consecutive terms, from 1989 to 1993.

== Books ==
His novel The Boss Is Crazy, Too (Dial, 1963) concerns Carson Hemple, art director of a comic-book and confession-magazine publishing company, who is told by the owner to help force the company into bankruptcy, and who responds with inventive embezzlement schemes. The book was inspired by his time at Toby Press.

The Neighborhood Watch (Doubleday, 1986) is about an impoverished Brooklyn writer who steals from his wealthy neighbors. Its protagonist, widowed father Loring Neiman, having turned to burglary when his book is rejected, discovers he has a knack for it. He prepares to give up the criminal life after becoming romantically involved with a married woman, but a criminally inclined neighbor coerces him into one purportedly final robbery. It was optioned for a movie.

== Awards ==
Lazarus won the National Cartoonists Society's award for Newspaper Strip, Humor, in 1973 and 1979, both times for Miss Peach.

He won the Reuben Award for Outstanding Cartoonist of the Year, for Miss Peach, in 1981, and the organization's Silver T-Square Award in 2000.

On January 23, 2016, Lazarus became the second recipient of the National Cartoonists Society Medal of Honor, established the year before.

== Personal life ==
Lazarus was married twice, first to Eileen Lazarus, which ended in divorce; then to Sally Mitchell, daughter of comic-strip gag writer Ed Mitchell. Lazarus lived in Los Angeles from the 1970s until his death on May 24, 2016. from complications from Alzheimer's. He had three daughters, Margie, Suesan and Cathie; six grandchildren; and one great-grandson.

== In popular culture ==
He made a cameo appearance in the 1992 Murder She Wrote episode "The Dead File."

His membership in Mensa was mentioned in the 1999 episode "They Saved Lisa's Brain" of The Simpsons.
