= The Lockhorns =

Comic strip

- The Lockhorns
- Author: Bill Hoest (1968–1988); Bunny Hoest (1988–present)
- Illustrator(s): Bill Hoest (1968–1988); John Reiner (1988–present)
- Website: The Lockhorns
- Current status/schedule: Running
- Launch date: September 9, 1968; 57 years ago
- Syndicate(s): King Features Syndicate (1968-2023); Andrews McMeel Syndication (2024-present)

The Lockhorns is a United States single-panel cartoon created September 9, 1968 by Bill Hoest and originally distributed by King Features Syndicate to 500 newspapers in 23 countries. The Lockhorns joined Andrews McMeel Syndication (AMS) January 1, 2024 and continues to appear in hundreds of newspapers worldwide and online through websites including AMS's GoComics. After Hoest's death in 1988 the comic panel was continued by his wife Bunny Hoest and cartoonist John Reiner. In 2017 Hoest donated the archives of more than 37,000 of her cartoons - including The Lockhorns, Howard Huge and others - to Adelphi University, where she obtained a Bachelor of Arts degree and an honorary doctorate.

== Premise ==
The Lockhorns presents the ups and downs of committed relationships through the lens of the married couple Loretta and Leroy Lockhorn, who constantly bicker.

The strip initially was titled The Lockhorns of Levittown, and many of the businesses and institutions depicted in the strip are real places located in or near Huntington, New York, on the North Shore of Long Island. "When we use names, we get permission," Bunny Hoest said in 2019. “Dr. [Harold] Blog was our doctor for many years. He passed away. We still use him. He stays alive in the comic." Anticipating national syndication, Bunny Hoest suggested shortening the title to The Lockhorns.

It began as a single-panel daily on September 9, 1968, with the Sunday feature launched April 9, 1972. The Sunday feature employs an unusual layout that grouped together several single-panel cartoons.

== Characters ==
Leroy works at an unspecified job, trying to make ends meet while Loretta keeps the home fires burning...literally. A notoriously bad cook, she has on more than one occasion set off smoke alarms in every part of the house. She is also a self-confessed shopaholic. Leroy's wandering eye and lazy lifestyle form part of the couple's comic conflicts too. The humor comes primarily from the exchanges between the couple themselves, with an occasional appearance by Leroy's outspoken mother-in-law and a hapless marriage counselor, Dr. Pullman.

== Books ==
Hoest has published multiple collections of The Lockhorns with Signet, Tor and Simon and Schuster's Wallaby Books. Tor has reissued expanded collections of several of these books. Hoest has published other books for other strips the studio has produced.

- What's the Garbage Doing on the Stove? Signet (1975)
- Loretta, the Meatloaf is Moving Signet (1976)
- Who Made the Caesar Salad, Brutus? Signet (1977)
- Is This the Steak or the Charcoal? Signet (1979)
- I See You Burned the Cold Cuts Again Signet (1981)
- Of Course I Love You - What Do I Know? Signet (1981)
- You Name It... I'm Guilty Signet (1982)
- Let's Go For a Walk and Bring your Wallet Signet (1982)
- I Could Live without These Meatballs-Probably Longer Signet (1982)
- This is Our Twenty-Fifth Anniversary. Don't You Think That's Enough? Simon and Schuster's Wallaby Books (1982)
- What Do You Mean You Weren't Listening? I Didn't Say Anything Tor (1983)
- Leroy is Very Proud of That Trophy and Wouldn't You Know it, He got it from Running Backwards Tor (1984)
- I'm Sticking to My Story...Whatever It Is Tor (1985)
- Dessert! We Made It into the Homestretch! Tor (1985)
- I'm Trying to Improve My Marriage, But I Can't Get her to Leave Tor (1990)
- It's a Letter Inviting Mother to Come Visit with Us I'll Mail it Myself Tor (1990)
- The Trouble With You is that You Judge Food Too Much by its Taste Barking Hollow Studios (2015)
- You Have to Spend Money to Make Money...I can Handle That Barking Hollow Studios (2024)

== Awards ==
Bill Hoest received the National Cartoonists Society's Newspaper Panel Cartoon Award for the strip for 1975 and 1980.

John Reiner won the National Cartoonists Society Award for Best Gag Cartoons in 1994. In 2013, Bunny Hoest and John Reiner were honored with The Golden Key Award and incited into the National Cartoonists Society Hall of Fame.

== Origin and location ==
Bill Hoest was a prolific gag cartoonist, submitting work to nearly every publication in the 1960s. He noticed that many of his submissions were on the subject of marriage and decided to create a comic strip with that theme. King Features liked the strip samples but suggested it would work better as a single panel, ironically having Hoest return the work into its original single-panel form.

The Lockhorns began syndication later that year. Originally titled The Lockhorns of Levittown, a reference to the new post-war Long Island suburban community, the single-panel cartoon appeared as a daily feature on September 9, 1968 until April 9, 1972, when its growing popularity brought about the addition of a Sunday cartoon, which incorporated a number of individual, stand-alone panels. Due to its widening appeal, the feature shortened its name to simply The Lockhorns.

The panel's humorous and universal take on a couple's life together resonated with readers around the world, appearing in many different countries, for more than 50 years. They appear in Spanish as Los Melaza, in French as La Famille Chicane, as well as in Chinese, German, Finnish, Hebrew, and more.

== Sources ==
- Strickler, Dave. Syndicated Comic Strips and Artists, 1924–1995: The Complete Index. Cambria, California: Comics Access, 1995. ISBN 0-9700077-0-1

== See also ==
- Andy Capp
