= Jasso =

Jasso may refer to:

== People ==
- Antonio Jasso (1935–2013), Mexican footballer
- Aracely Escalante Jasso, (born 1943), Mexican politician
- David Jasso (born 1961), Spanish writer, Disforia
- Guillermina Jasso, American sociologist
- Ignacia Jasso (1901–1982), Mexican drug dealer
- José Jasso (1911–1968), a Mexican character actor
- Julio César Jasso Ramírez, Mexican perpetrator of the 2026 Teotihuacan shooting
- María Leticia Jasso (born 1948), Mexican politician
- Ralph Jasso, U.S. musician, former member of The Mars Volta

== Other uses ==
- Jasso, Hidalgo, a town in the Mexican state of Hidalgo; see Cruz Azul Hidalgo
- A vernacular name for Payazzo (or pajatso), the traditional Finnish gambling arcade game
- An abbreviation for Japan Students Services Organization; see Japan and East Asia Studies Program

== See also ==
- Jasso-kissa (Jasso the cat), the Finnish comic book character by Jii Roikonen
