= Kreigh Collins =

Kreigh Collins may refer to:

- Kreigh Collins (tennis)
- Kreigh Collins (cartoonist)
