= Steketee =

Steketee is a surname. Notable people include:

- Frank Steketee (1900–1951), All American football player
- Mark Steketee (born 1994), Australian cricketer
- Sallie Steketee (1882–?), American painter
- Scott Steketee (born 1947), American rower at the 1968 Summer Olympics
