= Clyde Lamb =

American painter and cartoonist

- Clyde Lamb in Miami in 1956.
- Born: Clyde William Lamb; 11 March 1913 Sidney, Montana, U.S.
- Died: 8 July 1966 (aged 53) Dublin, Ireland
- Area: Cartoonist
- Notable works: Herman
- Spouses: Gladys (m. 1934; div. 1937) Gladys (m. 1947)

Clyde Lamb's painting for a calendar

Clyde William Lamb (March 11, 1913 – July 8, 1966) was an American artist and cartoonist whose gag cartoons were published in leading magazines of the 1940s and 1950s. He also drew a syndicated comic strip during the 1950s and 1960s.

== Biography ==
Born in Sidney, Montana, Lamb was drawing while he was in the Montana Industrial School for Boys at age 17.

=== Prison years (1932–1947) ===
At age 19, in Memphis, Tennessee, in 1932, he was convicted of armed robbery and given a five-year sentence. After escaping 18 months later, he made his way to Hammond, Indiana. While working there as a self-taught sign painter, he met and married Gladys Lamb on August 4, 1934. Ten days after his marriage, he was again arrested for armed robbery and sentenced to two 25-year terms in the Indiana State Penitentiary in Michigan City, Indiana.

On August 31, 1934, when Gladys was living in Calumet City, Illinois, she inserted a dozen broken hacksaw blades into pears and traveled to Gary, Indiana, to visit her husband in the Lake County jail. As she passed the pears to her husband, Chief deputy sheriff Carroll Holley became suspicious and intervened. (Carroll Holley was the nephew of Sheriff Lillian Holley, whose car was stolen by John Dillinger when he used a wooden gun to escape from that same jail earlier that summer.)

In April 1935, Lamb was escorted to Chicago to visit Gladys after their son James William Lamb, born March 26, 1935, had died on April 10, 1935. Clyde escaped from a guard at the train station by running in front of a moving train. Shot by a police officer when he was captured July 1935, he was returned to prison. Gladys Lamb filed for a divorce at Clyde's insistence, which was granted on November 1, 1937. She remarried and after Clyde was released June 24, 1947, Lamb left for Glendive, Montana, to visit relatives.

Gladys and Clyde Lamb remarried in Glendive, Montana, on October 14, 1947.

=== Art career ===
Clyde Lamb's Herman (January 12, 1964)

During the 1940s, Lamb began drawing while in prison and he was mentored by the prison crafts director on techniques. At first Clyde Lamb painted oil landscapes of his beloved Montana and a self portrait then he started to draw comics. He was urged to sell his cartoons by the prison arts and crafts Director. While Clyde was in prison he successfully marketed his cartoons to The Saturday Evening Post, Collier's, The American Magazine and other publications. During the last year while incarcerated he made $11,000.

His success and the surrounding publicity led directly to his release. Granted a new trial, he was convicted, but Judge William J. Murray at Crown Point gave him a ten-year suspended sentence. He was still wanted in Tennessee as an escaped convict, but Tennessee Governor Jim Nance McCord commuted his sentence and ordered him paroled to Indiana authorities.

The couple traveled extensively through California, Louisiana, Mississippi, Oregon, Washington, Europe, Africa, and Mexico from 1947 until his death.

On November 14, 1949, Lamb launched his pantomime newspaper comic strip, Herman, as a daily, with a Sunday strip added November 2, 1952. Distributed by Iowa's Register and Tribune Syndicate, Lamb's strip was carried during the 1950s in 55 newspapers in the United States, India and Africa, lasting until 1966. (It had no connection to the strip Herman by Jim Unger.)

On March 2, 1955, Lamb was surprised on live television to learn that Ralph Edwards had made him the subject of that week's This Is Your Life episode. The episode is available at the UCLA Film and Television Archive.

In 1957, Lamb began Open Season, a newspaper gag cartoon panel about hunting and fishing. Lamb also created oil paintings of landscapes mainly oil on canvas of the upper northwest and Montana areas. Clyde also produced a cartoon strip about an elephant named Milicent. Many other cartoons appeared in detective magazines and men's sporting publications. He produced many cartoons for calendars while under contract with Brown & Bigelow.

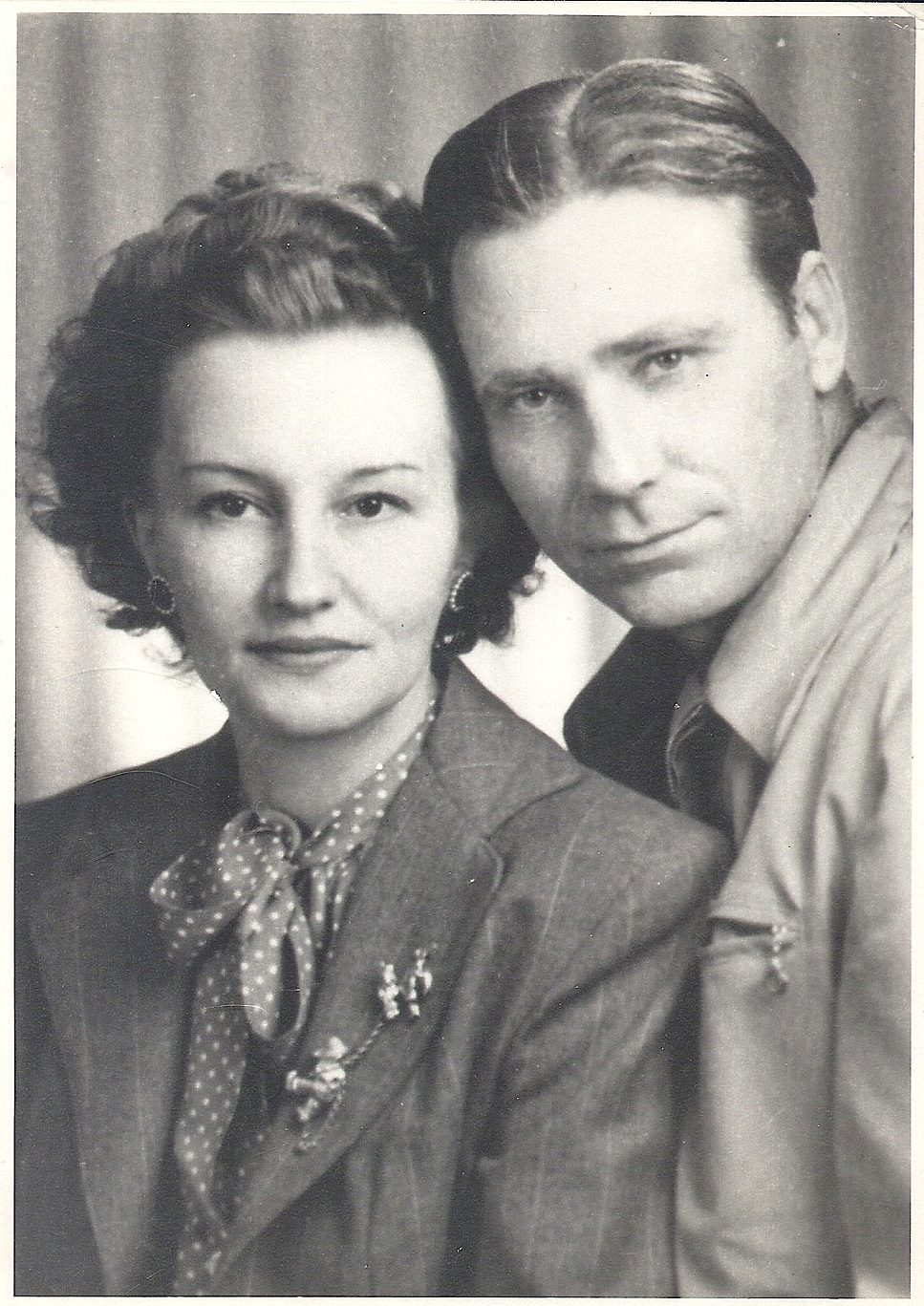
Gladys and Clyde

In November 1956, Clyde and Gladys were vacationing in Miami with plans to extend their vacation to Havana. His last address in the United States was 22839 Saticoy Street in Canoga Park in Los Angeles.

=== Death ===
At the age of 53, he died of pancreatic disease in Dublin, Ireland, on July 8, 1966, and was cremated at the Belfast Crematorium in Northern Ireland on August 12, 1966. His ashes were scattered by his family in Makoshika State Park in Montana.

== Bibliography ==
- Best Cartoons Crest Books 114 (1955)
- Best Cartoons Crest Books 390 (July 1960)
- Best Cartoons Crest Books K714 (May 1964)
- The Best Cartoons from Argosy Zenith Books ZB5 (October 1958)
- Cartoon Fun Gold Medal 383 (March 1954)
- Cartoon Fun Gold Medal 904 (1959)
- Cartoon Fun Gold Medal S1209 c (January 1962)
- Cartoon Fun Gold Medal S1498 (1964)
- A Cartoon Guide to the Kinsey Report Avon Books 559 (1954)
- Cartoon Treasury Bantam Books F1558 (January 1957)
- Forever Funny Dell First Edition 93 (1956)
- Funny Side Up Dell Books 607 (1952)
- How to Improve Your Reading by Paul Andrew Witty. Science Research Associates (1963)
- Indiana's Laughmakers: The Story of Over 400 Hoosiers: Actors, Cartoonists, Writers and Others by Ray Banta. PennUltimate Press (1990)
- Jokes and More Jokes Scholastic Book Services T-32
- Laughing on the Inside Dell Books 754 (1953)
- Nervous in the Service Dell First Edition 6298 (December 1962)
- Office Laffs Crest Books 159 (February 1957)
- The Other Woman Dell First Edition A178 (April 1959)
- The Saturday Evening Post Cartoons by John Bailey Dutton (1950)
- Sex Rears Its Lovely Head Bantam Books 1523 (October 1956)
- Still Too Funny for Words Dell Books 8286 (April 1964)
- Too Funny for Words: A Book For People Who Can’t Read Dell First Edition 39 (1954)
- Too Humorous to Mention Pocket Books 1200 (October 1958)
