= Mathias J. Alten House and Studio =

- U.S. National Register of Historic Places
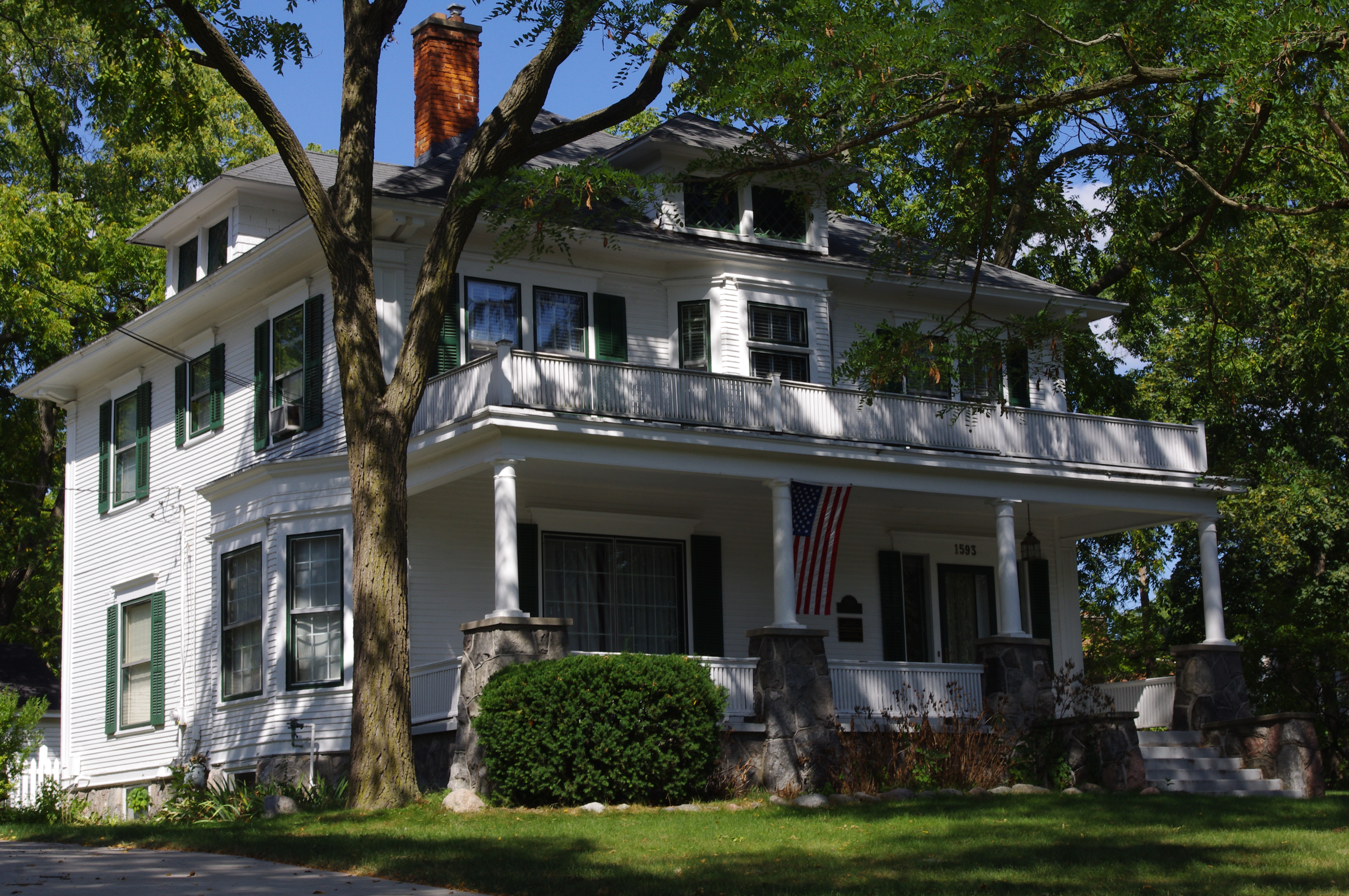
- Interactive map
- Location: 1593 E. Fulton St., Grand Rapids, Michigan
- Coordinates: 42°57′46″N 85°37′48″W
- Area: less than one acre
- Built: 1907
- Architectural style: Colonial Revival
- NRHP reference No.: 08001102
- Added to NRHP: June 23, 2009

The Mathias J. Alten House and Studio is a single-family home located at 1593 East Fulton Street in Grand Rapids, Michigan. It was owned and lived in by Mathias Alten, a German-American impressionist painter, from 1914 until his death in 1938. The house was listed on the National Register of Historic Places in 2009.

== History ==
Mathias J. Alten was born in 1871 in what is now the Hunsrück in Germany. There, he served a three-year apprenticeship as a muralist before emigrating with his parents and family to Grand Rapids in 1888. He continued to paint, making a living by sign lettering, scenery painting, furniture decoration, and painting murals and frescoes. In 1895 he married Bertha Schwind and began working for her cabinet-maker family. He also continued painting, which proved popular, and in 1898, with the help of generous patrons, he attended art schools in Paris for a year. On his return to Grand Rapids, his family moved into rented quarters and Alten began painting full-time, using a series of downtown studios. By 1905 he was being invited to show at major institutions across the United States. In 1906, the Altens moved into a new Dutch Colonial house on Hope Street in Grand Rapids. However, by 1914, they were looking for a new place to live.

The land where the Alten House now stands was previously a working farm, first established in 1835. In the 1860s, the 40-acre section where this house now stands was purchased by W.H. Wood. It passed through multiple owners, and in 1904 it was purchased by Albert and Emily Stacey. Farming activity on the land eventually ceased, and in 1907 the Staceys built a new foursquare house on the property. The Staceys sold the property in 1914, and later that year Mathias Alten purchased it on a land contract. Mathias, Bertha, and their three daughters moved to the house, along with Bertha's mother.

After moving in, the Altens tore down the original farmhouse. A barn on the property was left standing until the 1920s. Alten also constructed a garage, and later a small honeymoon cottage for his daughters as they married. The land contract was paid off in 1927, after which the Altens platted the farm acreage and began slowly selling lots. When the Great Depression began, Alten gave up his rented studio space downtown, and remodeled part of his house into a painting studio. He remained both living and painting in the house until his death in 1938.

After Mathias Alten's death, the last of the platted lots was sold, with Bertha Alten retaining three of them, including the one this house sits on. In the early 1940s, she went to live with her daughter, and rented out the foursquare Alten house. She later sold it; the house passed through a series of owners before being purchased by Alten's granddaughter in 2002.

== Description ==
The Mathias J. Alten House and Studio is a two-story foursquare house with a low pitched hip roof having three wide hipped dormers. It sits on an uncoursed granite foundation. A single-story kitchen wing with a gable roof is at the rear. The front facade has a massive full-width porch, also sitting on a granite foundation, with wood railings and spindles. Granite piers topped with concrete support tapered cylindrical wooden Tuscan columns. Concrete steps lead up to a front entry with a wooden door flanked by sidelights. Most windows on the house are wood-framed, double-hung single-glazed units.
