= Sallie Steketee =

Sallie Hall Steketee (Mrs. Paul Frederick Steketee) (born September 11, 1882) was an American painter. She was the daughter of William Campbell and Julia (Jackson) hall of Brazil, Indiana. On January 28, 1908 she married Paul Fredrick Steketee of Grand Rapids, Michigan. They had two sons, Paul, Fredrick, Jr. and Campbell Hall Steketee.

She studied at the Art Academy of Cincinnati and she specialized in still lifes. She was a member of the National Association of Women Painters, and exhibited in Chicago and at the Hoosier Salon in the 1920s-30s.

Steketee's sister-in-law, Helen Steketee, was also a well-known artist from Grand Rapids, Michigan artist who exhibited around Detroit in the 1930s. She studied with Mathias Alten and Breckenridge.
