= 2026 Teotihuacan shooting =

Mass shooting in State of Mexico, Mexico

2026 Teotihuacan pyramids shooting
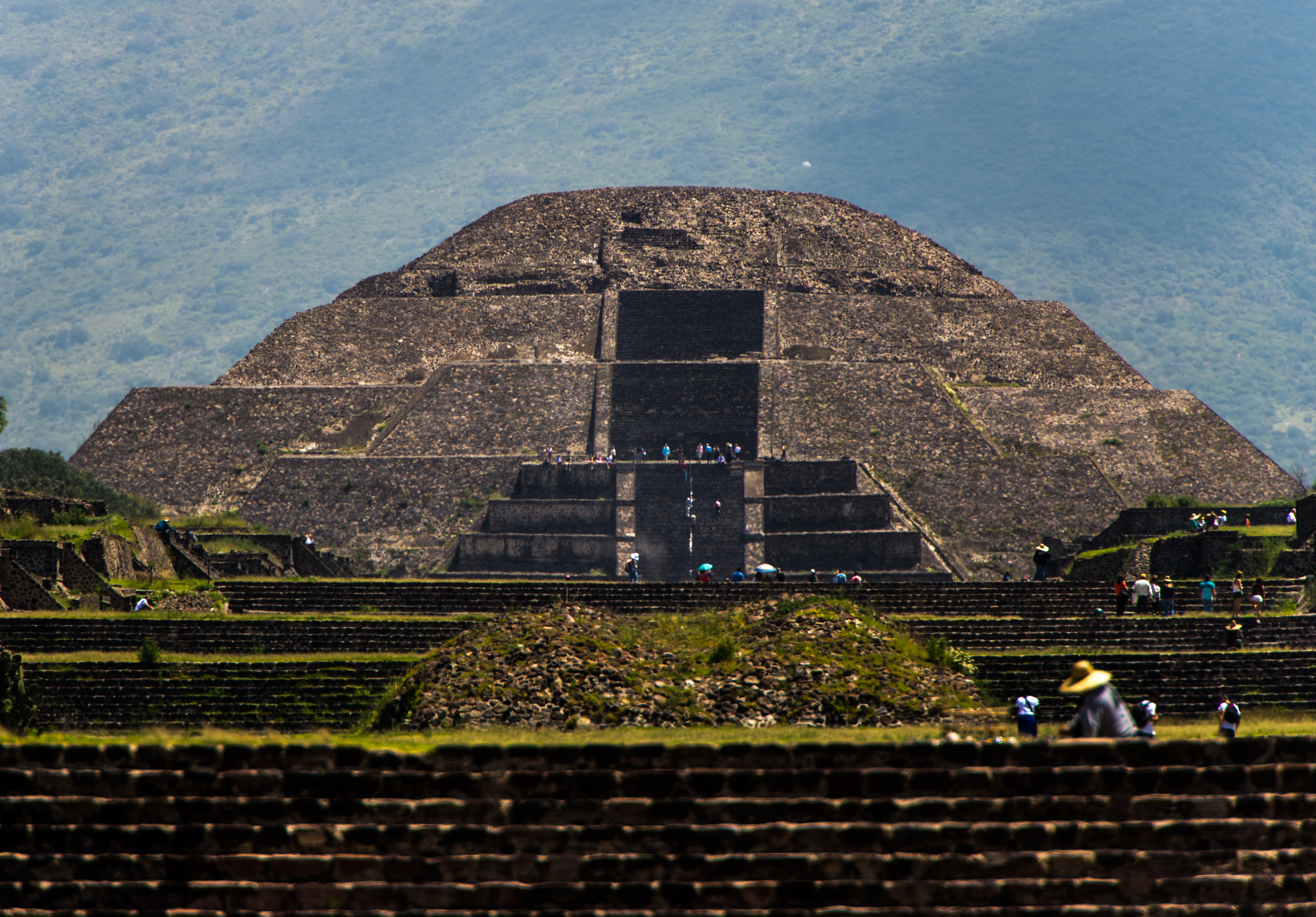
- The Pyramid of the Moon, where the perpetrator shot his victims.
- Location: 19.69928°N 98.84412°W; Pyramid of the Moon, Teotihuacan, Mexico
- Date: 20 April 2026 c.11:20 a.m. (Zona Centro; UTC-06:00)
- Attack type: Mass shooting, hostage-taking, shootout, murder–suicide, Columbine High School massacre copycat
- Weapons: .38-caliber Smith & Wesson Model 10 snub-nosed revolver; Knife (unused)
- Deaths: 2 (including the perpetrator)
- Injuries: 13 (7 by gunfire)
- Perpetrator: Julio César Jasso Ramírez
- Motive: Under investigation

On 20 April 2026, a mass shooting occurred at the Teotihuacan archaeological site in the State of Mexico, Mexico. Julio César Jasso Ramírez, 27, opened fire from atop the Pyramid of the Moon, killing a Canadian woman and injuring 13 other tourists before committing suicide.

== Background ==
Teotihuacan is one of the largest and most visited pre-Columbian archaeological sites in Mexico and is a major international tourist destination and UNESCO World Heritage Site. It is located in the State of Mexico, approximately 48 km (30 mi) northeast of Mexico City.

== Shooting ==
At approximately 11:20 a.m. (UTC−06:00), the gunman had an argument with several people before opening fire from the top of the Pyramid of the Moon. A tour guide working at the site reported first hearing gunfire at that time. A witness said they heard more than 20 shots. Mexican media described the suspect as a man aged between 25 and 30 who was wearing tactical-style pants and boots.

A group of visitors was unable to escape; the attacker allegedly ordered them to lie on the ground before walking to another spot, reloading, and returning to continue shooting. Video footage recorded by bystanders showed the perpetrator walking across the pyramid after firing approximately 20 to 30 shots, moving away from a group of victims on the ground while bystanders took cover. While he was holding a group of tourists at gunpoint, in videos of the incident he can be heard saying he was going to "sacrifice" them in reference to human sacrifice in pre-Columbian cultures; he also falsely claimed to have already killed two Koreans. He can be heard speaking with a fake Peninsular Spanish accent, apparently telling some tourists from Europe that they would not be returning.

Ten minutes later, security forces arrived at the site. The gunman freed some hostages. Subsequently, a confrontation began in which the attacker was wounded in the leg. At 11:45 a.m., the perpetrator turned the gun on himself and died by suicide at the scene. A 60-year-old .38 Special revolver, a tactical knife, and more than 50 rounds of ammunition were recovered.

== Victims ==
One woman, a 29-year-old Canadian tourist, was killed, and 13 other tourists were injured: six Americans, three Colombians, two Brazilians, one Russian, and another Canadian. Six of the 13 were injured indirectly while fleeing the scene. According to the authorities, seven people were treated for gunshot wounds, while six suffered fall injuries. One person was treated for an anxiety attack related to the incident. Among the injured were a six-year-old, a 13-year-old, and one person who was left in critical condition. All were transported to Axapusco General Hospital for treatment.

== Perpetrator ==
The Attorney General's Office of the State of Mexico identified the perpetrator as 27-year-old Julio César Jasso Ramírez (Note: In this Mexican name, the surname is Jasso and the second or maternal family name is Ramírez.) (9 September 1998 – 20 April 2026), a native of Tlapa, Guerrero; his voter credential, with an address in Mexico City's northern borough of Gustavo A. Madero, was found in his bag.

According to police sources, he expressed admiration for Adolf Hitler and generated an AI photo of himself with Eric Harris and Dylan Klebold, the perpetrators of the 1999 Columbine High School massacre. The attack also occurred on the 27th anniversary of the Columbine shooting and on Hitler's 137th birthday. Below his shirt, he wore a T-shirt bearing the phrase "Disconnect and Self-Destruct", associated with the Columbine massacre, and in his backpack were books about Columbine. In handwritten notes also found in his backpack, he had written that he was guided by an "inspiration from beyond" and that he "followed orders from supernatural entities". According to the authorities, Jasso fit the profile of a copycat, an imitator who replicates symbolic crimes.

Some newspapers, including Milenio and El Universal, speculated about ties to the True Crime Community internet phenomenon.

== Aftermath ==
Following the shooting, state security forces and the National Guard were deployed to the site. The Mexican police opened a formal investigation into the incident. The attack occurred just weeks before the World Cup, which Mexico hosted with the United States and Canada. While investigations progress, President Claudia Sheinbaum called for stricter controls in tourist areas. Two days later, Mexico reopened Teotihuacan under heavy scrutiny and strict security measures, but tourist numbers were significantly lower than usual. Access to the pyramid, however, remained restricted even after the site was reopened.

== Reactions ==
President Claudia Sheinbaum expressed solidarity with the victims, stating, "What happened today in Teotihuacán deeply hurts us. I express my most sincere solidarity with the people affected and their families. We are in contact with the Canadian Embassy." She said she was closely monitoring the situation.

Canada's foreign ministry confirmed that one of its citizens was killed and another was wounded. In a statement, it expressed condolences to the victims' families and thanked the Mexican government for its response.

A week after the shooting, the National Institute of Anthropology and History (INAH) installed metal detectors at Teotihuacan and at some of the nation's other leading pre-Columbian sites: Chichen Itza in Yucatán, Monte Albán in Oaxaca, Palenque in Chiapas, and Tulum in Quintana Roo.

== See also ==
- 2026 Lázaro Cárdenas school shooting – a shooting in the state of Michoacán that occurred approximately one month prior
- Columbine effect
