= Bob Artley =

American cartoonist (1917–2011)

- Born: George Robert Artley; July 1, 1917; Franklin County, Iowa
- Died: October 21, 2011 (aged 94)
- Occupation: Cartoonist

George Robert Artley (July 1, 1917 – October 21, 2011) was a professional illustrator, commercial artist, cartoonist, and writer. He was probably best known for his editorial cartoons which ran in the Des Moines Tribune, and the Daily Globe of Worthington, Minnesota , and AgriNews (based in Rochester, Minnesota and for his feature panel "Memories of a Former Kid", many of which still appear in publication. Artley also wrote or illustrated many books, most of which recount his memories of growing up on his parents' Northern Iowa farm during the first half of the 20th century.

== Early life ==
Artley, the first born of George Denison Artley and Elsie Louise (Crow) Artley, was born on the family farm (established by his grandfather in 1877) five miles west of Hampton and three miles east of Latimer, Iowa. Artley attended grade school at a country school within a two-mile walking distance of his parents’ farm and after passing his eighth grade exams, went on to Hampton High School where he graduated in 1935. While growing up, Artley took an interest in drawing and art, an interest which was nurtured by friends and family. During High School, Artley started focusing on editorial cartooning, partly at the behest of Miss Dunn, Artley's English teacher, and was featured at the high school and in local stores and publications. This exposure led to his being mentored by Artley's idol, the Des Moines Tribune's J.N. "Ding" Darling, who critiqued his work, supplied him with drawing supplies, and suggested he start drawing from life about subjects close to him – thus Artley's lifelong stock in trade of drawing scenes from the farm. Although he drew all aspects of the farm, many of his first live subjects were pigs since their pen was most available. Many of his earliest sketches can be seen in his 2003 book Living With Pigs. His love for drawing was matched with his love for farm life:

"I like everything about a farm," he said in a 2003 interview with the Worthington Globe Gazette. “There was a downside, of course, like everything else. It was hard work – discouraging at times – but you’re outside. I liked the outside. I liked the animals. I just liked the whole farm atmosphere.”

After high school, he attended Grinnell College while helping his father on the farm. In the fall of 1941, just before starting what would be his senior year at Grinnell, Artley volunteered for the U.S. Army. After first being assigned to the Army Corps of Engineers, he was later transferred to the Medical Corps where he was a Medic and then a Laboratory Technician drawing slides. Although his wartime service was all stateside, he was being trained to be part of the U.S. force for the Operation Downfall invasion of the Japanese Homelands when the atomic bombs ended the war. While in the Army in 1943, he met and married fellow lab technician and Women's Army Auxiliary Corps enlistee Virginia E. (Ginny) Moore, of South Fork, PA while they were both stationed at Fort Leonard Wood in central Missouri. Artley returned to civilian life in 1946 where he continued farming with his father. In 1950, he returned to college on the G.I. Bill of Rights, attending the University of Iowa, and completed his Bachelor of Fine Arts in 1951.

== Drawing career ==
While at the University of Iowa, he drew editorial cartoons for the school's paper, the Daily Iowan, and his work caught the attention of the Des Moines Tribune. He was hired by the newspaper and worked there from 1952 to 1957. Artley went on to work for Nelson Advertising Agency for a year and then was art director for Plain Talk Publishing (both in Des Moines) for nine years. During these years, he was active in the area arts communities as a member of the Des Moines Art Center, through teaching art classes, conducting numerous "chalk talks" at various schools and civic functions, and mentoring local aspiring artists. In 1967, the Artley's moved to Adrian, Minnesota where the couple published the small town newspaper, The Nobles County Review. Shortly after, they purchased a building in Adrian and began a commercial printing company, The Print Shop.

In 1971, he began doing some commercial and cartoon work for the Worthington Daily Globe, which eventually led to exclusive cartoon work and his editorial cartoons were routinely among the best in the country. During his time at The Globe, he started a periodic and popular cartoon of life on the farm during his childhood called, "Memories of a Former Kid." This led in 1978 to Artley self-publishing the book by the same name. Due to its popularity, Artley couldn't keep up with the demand and sold the rights to Iowa State University Press. On June 8, 1982, the day the “Memories of a Former Kid” cartoon began appearing in the Mason City, Iowa Globe Gazette, Artley described what he was trying to achieve in depicting Iowa farm life in the 1920s and 30s:

“I wanted to show how things used to be done,” he said, “the mood of the times, the poetry of living then. I wanted to give proper perspective to a life that was good and can still be good."

In 1982, his wife was diagnosed with Alzheimer's disease which required constant care. After five years of home care, her condition worsened and she was moved to hospice at the Iowa Veterans Home where she stayed until shortly before her death in 1991 at the age of 74. Artley's book Ginny, a Love Remembered, about his wife's struggles and death, was endorsed by the Alzheimer's Association and contained a foreword by Princess Yasmin Aga Khan, daughter of 1940's starlett Rita Hayworth, who was active in Alzheimer's disease awareness due to her mother's struggles with the disease. Artley retired from full-time work in 1986.

== Retirement ==
After his retirement, he continued drawing feature panels that were syndicated by Extra Newspaper Features Syndicate based at the Rochester (MN) Post-Bulletin. He also began writing his other books, including Christmas on the Farm, Living With Cows, and Country School Days – all richly illustrated with his drawings of rural and farm life. His books netted a substantial fan base in farming communities throughout the U.S. and Canada. His works were popular among rural regions of Europe as they were a study in life on the farm in the first years of the previous century regardless of country or geographical region. Through the 1990s, Artley made appearances on local talk shows, including Minneapolis' popular "Boone & Erickson Show" broadcast by WCCO-AM radio, to spin his stories of farm life. In 2007, many of Artley's cartoons were donated to Minnesota West Community and Technical College.

With wife Ginny, he had four children: Jeannie, Robert, Steven, and Joan (Artley) Sterner. Daughter Jeannie died at the age of 54 after a battle with breast cancer. After his wife's death, Artley's book about their life together led to meeting his second wife Margaret (Hawes). Margaret, whose spouse had also died from Alzheimers, contacted Artley and they corresponded for a time. The couple was married in 1995 and resettled to Akron, Ohio.

All three of Artley's surviving children collaborated on his last book, Memories of A Farm Kitchen, after Artley suffered a series of strokes while putting the book together. Rob, a retired school administrator, who has a monthly opinion column in his hometown Rochester Post-Bulletin, helped in final composing and received co-author credit. Steve, who followed in his father's footsteps as an editorial cartoonist, and Joan, an illustrator, helped their father with the book's artwork. Artley died a little over a year after publication, at the age of 94, and his inurnment was near his boyhood home in the Hampton Cemetery. He was survived by his three children, five step-children, 11 grandchildren, 13 great-grandchildren, 10 step-grandchildren, and 12 step-great-grandchildren.

== Bibliography ==
=== Books authored/co-authored ===
1. Artley, Bob. Issues and Closeups: A Selection of Editorial Cartoons from the Years 1971–1973. The Print Shop (1973).
2. Artley, Bob. Issues and Closeups II: Including Watergate, Washington, and Memories Of A Former Kid. Worthington Daily Globe (1974). ASIN B0006XJQRO
3. Artley, Bob. Memories Of A Former Kid. Iowa State University Press (1978). 96 pages. ASIN B0038AW2Z0
4. Artley, Bob. Ginny: A Love Remembered. Wiley-Blackwell, 1st edition (January 16, 1991). 258 pages. ISBN 0-8138-2104-5
5. Artley, Bob. A Book Of Chores: As Remembered By A Former Kid. The Printers (1986) 100 pages. ASIN B0006EOL4G
6. Artley, Bob. Cartoons: From The Newspaper Series Memories of A Former Kid. Iowa State University Press (December 1988). 184 pages. ISBN 0-8138-1068-X
7. Artley, Bob. A Country School: Marion No. 7. Iowa State University Press, 1st edition (December 1989). 94 pages. ISBN 0-8138-1077-9
8. Artley, Bob. Cartoons II. Iowa State Press; 1st edition (December 1989). 181 pages. ISBN 0-8138-1067-1
9. Artley, Bob. Country Christmas. Iowa State Press, 1st edition (September 1994). 40 pages. ISBN 0-8138-2778-7
10. Artley, Bob. Living With Cows. Iowa State University Press (September 1996). 95 pages. ISBN 0-8138-2648-9
11. Artley, Bob. Country Things. Iowa State University Press (September 1994). 128 pages. ISBN 0-8138-2650-0
12. Artley, Bob. More Country Things. Iowa State University Press (August 1995), 144 pages. ISBN 0-8138-2451-6
13. Artley, Bob. Once Upon A Farm. Pelican Publishing (August 7, 2000). 128 pages. ISBN 1-56554-753-5
14. Artley, Bob. Living With Pigs. Pelican Publishing (April 30, 2003). 96 pages. ISBN 1-58980-104-0
15. Artley, Bob. Christmas On The Farm. Pelican Publishing (September 30, 2003). 96 pages. ISBN 1-58980-108-3
16. Artley, Bob. Seasons on the Farm. Voyageur Press (October 30, 2003). 192 pages. ISBN 0-89658-609-X
17. Artley, Bob. Book Of Farm Chores. Voyageur Press (December 14, 2003). 96 pages. ISBN 0-89658-434-8
18. Artley, Bob. Memories of a Former Kid: Once Upon a Time on the Family Farm. Voyageur Press (December 14, 2003). 96 pages. ISBN 0-89658-493-3
19. Artley, Bob. Country School Days. Voyageur Press (March 10, 2006). 104 pages. ISBN 0-7603-2462-X
20. Artley, Bob. Country Christmas Remembered. Voyageur Press, 1st edition (September 15, 2006). 40 pages. ISBN 0-7603-2652-5
21. Artley, Bob and Artley, Rob. Memories Of A Farm Kitchen. Pelican Publishing (September 2, 2010). 96 pages. ISBN 1-58980-150-4

=== Books contributed to/illustrated ===
1. Pelton, Beulah Meier and Artley, Bob (illustrator). We Belong to the Land: Memories of a Midwesterner. Iowa State University Press, 1st edition (October 30, 1984). ISBN 0-8138-1143-0
2. Piper, Ralph. Point of No Return: An Aviator's Story. Iowa State University Press, 1 edition (January 1990). 206 pages. ISBN 0-8138-0158-3
3. Shoemaker, Verl and Artley, Bob (illustrator). Tales Out of School (Iowa Heritage Collection). Iowa State Press; 1st edition (August 1995). 68 pages. ISBN 0-8138-2244-0
4. Dregni, Michael. Minnesota Days. Voyageur Press (October 10, 1999). Minnesota Days. 160 pages. ISBN 0-89658-421-6
5. Welsch, Roger; Sale, Charles; and Artley, Bob. Ode to the Outhouse: A Tribute to a Vanishing American Icon. Voyageur Press (March 2002). 108 pages. ISBN 0-89658-598-0
6. Townsend, Una Belle and Artley, Bob (illustrator). Grady's In The Silo. Pelican Publishing (January 31, 2003). ISBN 1-58980-098-2
7. Rost-Holtz, Amy. A Farm Country Christmas. Voyageur Press (November 9, 2003). 160 pages. ISBN 0-89658-440-2
8. Hahn, Cathy and Artley, Bob (illustrator). Step Up! A Mackinac Island Tale. Pelican Publishing (February 8, 2005). 28 pages. ISBN 1-58980-214-4
9. Aldrich, Margret. This Old Quilt: A Heartwarming Celebration of Quilts And Quilting Memories Voyageur Press (November 6, 2005). 160 pages. ISBN 0-89658-748-7
10. Dean, Thomas; Artley, Bob; Vinz, Mark; Martinelli, Louis; Holm, Bill, et al. Grace of Grass and Water: Writing in Honor of Paul Gruchow. Ice Cube Press (November 1, 2007). 149 pages. ISBN 978-1-888160-28-4
11. Perry, Michael, Artley, Bob, Welsch, Roger, et al. My First Tractor: Stories of Farmers and Their First Love. Voyageur Press, (August 8, 2010).
