= Mister Boffo =

American comic strip by Joe Martin

- Author: Joe Martin
- Current status/schedule: Running
- Launch date: June 9, 1986
- Syndicate(s): Neatly Chiseled Features (current); Tribune Media Syndicate (previous)
- Genre: Humor

Mister Boffo is an American comic strip created by Joe Martin. The strip has been in syndication since June 9, 1986, originally distributed by Tribune Media Services and now distributed by Martin's own Neatly Chiseled Features.

The strip's main character is a balding, big-nosed man named Earl who is usually shown as married to a pretty blonde named Nadine and as the owner of a small white "wonder dog" named Weederman. However, there is no particular continuity in the strip from day to day; the characters may turn up in prehistoric times or in a futuristic spaceship, or in heaven or hell. Even in the strips set in contemporary times, Earl is depicted variously as a corporate executive, a working-class person, a prisoner, or a homeless beggar. Strips often illustrate recurring themes, such as "A Time to Worry" and "People Unclear on the Concept".

"Mister Boffo" strips have been collected in the books Mister Boffo: Unclear on the Concept (1989) (ISBN 0-316-54859-6), Mister Boffo: Shrink Wrapped (1995) (ISBN 0-8362-1777-2), Mister Boffo: The First Decade (1996) (ISBN 0836214420), and Boffo (2008) (ISBN 0974596752).

Many of the cartoons have also been reprinted in the newspaper strip On The Edge which Martin does in partnership with psychologist Dr. Jon Carlson and which uses them as an opening visualization to personal counseling advice.

The character's strangest appearance, however, was in the truly bizarre self-published single issue comic book Boffo In Hell (1995). In this issue, co-drawn by the cartoonist's teenage son and future music video director Jay Martin, lovable loser Earl Boffo is transformed into a realistically drawn Image Comics-style scarlet-suited satanic superhero, and his little dog Weederman into a huge humanoid werewolf, after a powerful giant alien wedding ring falls to Earth and jams itself onto Earl's skull like a metal headband. The powered-up pair then battle an escaped trio of overly-muscled genetically altered mutant psychopaths who they accidentally dispatch to the title netherworld where the dead villains promptly kill all the devil guards and take over, setting up the storyline for future issues that never saw print.
