= Little Farmer =

American comic strip by Kern Pederson

Little Farmer was a weekly American comic strip drawn by Kern Pederson, which was in syndication from 1953 to 1988. The strip featured a short, chubby, moustached farmer, who never spoke, and usually his dog. As with the strips The Little King and Henry, the humor was conveyed via pantomime.
