= Hoxwinder Hall =

American comic strip by Dan Boris

- Hoxwinder Hall
- Author(s): Dan Boris
- Website: hoxwinderhall.com
- Current status/schedule: Running
- Syndicate(s): Ink Bottle Syndicate
- Genre(s): Humor

Hoxwinder Hall is an American comic strip by Daniel Boris, who started the strip while in art school in the 1980s at Art Institute of Pittsburgh.

== Characters and Story ==
Byron Hoxwinder gets much more than he bargains for when he secretly brings a baby alligator home from a family vacation in Florida. Hoxwinder Hall is about two brothers, an unlikely pet alligator named Dozi, and the law of unintended consequences.

The comic strip's main characters:

- Byron Hoxwinder, 10-year-old boy.
- Dozi, the lovable little alligator.
- Rowdy Hoxwinder, Byron's older brother.

== Contests and Syndication ==
Hoxwinder Hall first gained attention when it was selected as a Top 10 finalist in the Washington Post's 2010 "America's Next Great Cartoonist" contest. The contest judges included Stan Lee, Richard Thompson, and Gene Weingarten. The strip was then voted a Top 5 finalist by the public.

In early 2011, the comic strip was the runner-up in the Cartoonist Studio's "So You Wanna Be A Cartoonist" competition. As a result of this contest, Boris was awarded a mentorship with syndicated cartoonist Rick Kirkman, co-creator of the very successful syndicated Baby Blues comic strip.

In December 2011, Hoxwinder Hall was signed to a syndication agreement with Ink Bottle Syndicate to print and distribute the comic throughout the U.S. through a weekly newspaper called "Funnies Extra!".
