= Malcolm Hancock =

American comics artist and cartoonist

Malcolm "Mal" Hancock (May 20, 1936 – February 16, 1993) was an American comics artist and cartoonist, most notable for his work in National Review.

== Biography ==
Hancock's work was also seen regularly in such publications as Playboy, The Saturday Evening Post, Motive magazine, and the Washington Post. He drew many comic strips, including 'Nibbles' (1960–63), 'Humphrey Hush' (1963),'Patrick' (1965–69), 'The Fantastic Foster Fenwick' (1968–72), Polly (1972–73), 'Fenwick' (1977-1979), 'The Lumpits' (1970–78) 'Pig Newton' (1983),'Willie' (1983–85) 'Malfunction Junction' (1990–93), and 'Hi and Jinx' (1991–93). The Citadel Press, Inc. (NYC) published a book of his earliest cartoons in 1968: 'How Can You Stand It Out There!" His work was notable for its sharp satire.

Hancock was paralyzed from the waist down and used a wheelchair after a fall he suffered as a teen. He was vacationing with his family in Wisconsin. He and his dad decided to play a round of golf. Mal was looking for a lost ball and did not realize he was so close to the unmarked edge of a limestone cliff. He slid about 15 feet and then free fell the additional 35 feet. He credits his handicap for realizing his potential. He said, "You have to play with the hand you are dealt. Everyone has a handicap--with some it is physical; with others, it is psychological, mental or whatever. Sometimes a handicap is an advantage because it focuses your attention on your talent. I was lucky because I had a particular talent that could be focused--and it wasn't tied to my legs." At the age of 56, he died of cancer.
