= Mathias Alten =

American painter

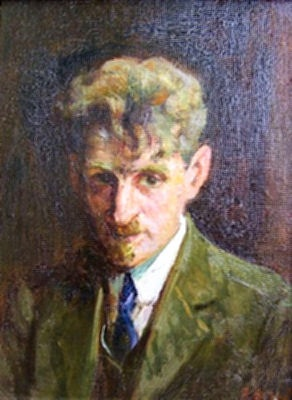
Alten self-portrait

Mathias Joseph Alten (February 13, 1871 – March 8, 1938) was a German-American impressionist painter active in Grand Rapids, Michigan.

== Career ==
Born in Gusenburg, Germany, Alten worked as an artist between 1890 and 1938. Although best known for his land- and seascapes he was also an accomplished portrait, floral, and animal painter. William H. Gerdts, a pre-eminent authority on American regional painting, describes Alten's style as that of a "second-generation Impressionist." Alten studied at the acclaimed Académie Julian and at the Académie Colarossi where he won a gold medal for the best figure drawing. As early in his career as 1905, Alten was being invited to show his paintings in museum exhibits. During his lifetime, his work was exhibited at the National Academy in New York, the Art Institute of Chicago, the Corcoran Gallery in Washington, D.C., the Pennsylvania Academy of the Fine Arts, the Detroit Institute of Art and other smaller venues.

According to Gerdts, "By 1898 Alten appears to have felt the need for greater professional training and exposure … to more cosmopolitan experience in artistic craftsmanship and association." He made a number of voyages to Europe; first to study his craft in Paris (with the help of wealthy patrons) in 1899. Then, attracted to the Hague School of Dutch artists, he spent 1910-11 working in the Netherlands. Later, Alten fell under the influence of the work of Spanish painter Joaquín Sorolla. Several working trips to Spain followed, the first being in 1912.

An exhibit of Alten's sun-drenched canvasses from the 1920s was held at the Holt Galleries in New York City. The Literary Digest for October 12, 1929, featured the showing with an article and a reproduction of one of the Spanish marine scenes on its front cover. This was perhaps the high point of Alten's national recognition.

Alten's career entailed an astounding amount of travel, especially given the conditions at the time – sea voyages, less than luxurious trains, horse-drawn carriages. He frequently visited noted art colonies such as Étaples in France; Old Lyme, Connecticut; Taos, New Mexico; Laguna Beach, California and Tarpon Springs, Florida. He was considered to be a mentor to fellow Michigan artist Kreigh Collins. But, although Alten painted alongside several artists, he never became a resident member of any artists' colony. Nor did he formally, by designation or choice, become a follower of specific "schools" such as the Fauves in France or the Ashcan School of the Depression era.

Alten continued his working trips within the US well into the 1930s, traveling to both coasts, Florida, Taos and always within his beloved West Michigan. His subject matter was notably diverse; landscapes, still life objects, seascapes, animals and portraits – often of judges throughout Michigan, as well as other notables as far afield as California and Oregon.

His style evolved in accordance with both the tastes of the times and his own preferences. He never felt pressure to veer into the overtly "modernist" style which artists of the generation after his frequently embraced.

Over the years, various local (West Michigan) arts-affiliated organizations named Alten as an honorary member. Regional and national organizations sought his membership as well. By 1904, he had joined the pioneering Society of Western Artists, one of the era's most influential art organizations. And, in 1916, he was invited to become a member of the National Arts Club in New York. In addition, Alten was a longtime member of Detroit's prestigious Scarab Club, in which he was awarded a gold medal for his art in 1920.

According to James A. Straub, the compiler of his Catalogue Raisonne, Alten is often referred to as the "dean of Michigan painters." Alten lived at 1593 East Fulton Street in Grand Rapids, Michigan. That home is now listed on the National Register of Historic Places.

== Death ==
In 1937, Alten was diagnosed with mitral stenosis, a narrowing of the heart valve. The same year, he painted his last known self-portrait, "elf Portrait, Myself at 66, in which he is depicted standing jauntily with his paint palette and smoking a cigar. He died, on March 8, 1938, of a heart attack caused by a blood clot (coronary thrombosis) at his home in Grand Rapids, Michigan. He was 67.
