= Lucky Cow =

American comic strip by Mark Pett

- Author(s): Mark Pett
- Website: www.gocomics.com/luckycow
- Current status/schedule: Concluded daily strip
- Launch date: April 21, 2003
- End date: February 2, 2008
- Syndicate(s): Universal Press Syndicate
- Genre(s): Humor, Satire
- Preceded by: Mr. Lowe

Lucky Cow was a syndicated comic strip created by Mark Pett and distributed by Universal Press Syndicate. It focuses around the fictional fast food chain Lucky Cow and its workers. In the strip, the restaurant's advertisements advocate obesity and unhealthy eating habits.

== Publication history ==
The strip began on April 21, 2003, and the last strip ran on February 2, 2008. The strip appeared in about 50 papers.

Pett previously created the comic strip Mr. Lowe, which was distributed through Creators Syndicate from 2000 to 2001. Characters from Mr. Lowe make occasional cameos in Lucky Cow.

A Lucky Cow strip earned a place in Guinness World Records as the World's Largest Comic Strip, after students at Gentry High School in Indianola, Mississippi assembled a strip that was 135 feet (41 m) wide and almost 48 feet (15 m) high.

In January 2008, Universal Press Syndicate confirmed reports that Pett had decided to end Lucky Cow. According to the Daily Cartoonist, Pett had been thinking about the decision for a while, and he ultimately ended it when the timing felt just right and the strip seemed to have run its course. He was also planning to explore other creative opportunities, some of which will be related to cartooning.

Lucky Cow ended in a dramatic fashion with its final series, in which the employees of the franchise are getting ready to welcome Javier, a Mexican exchange student who will be working there, to the United States. To make him feel at home, Gary hangs a Mexican flag in front of the restaurant, launching a controversy when photographs turn up on the internet with the caption, "United States of Mexico? When did Lucky Cow start hating America?!" Picketers, including Clare, line up outside the restaurant demanding a nationwide boycott of Lucky Cow franchises. Lucky Cow corporate responds to the damage the flag incident has caused by closing the franchise and selling the premises to another business—Cash Cow, which lends title loans. The final strip ran on February 2, 2008.

== Story and characters ==
All of the main characters are employees of the same Lucky Cow fast food restaurant.

- Gary is the manager of this Lucky Cow franchise. He is a single father raising two children. He likes to imagine that he is bringing the world a little bit closer together through fast food; he loves customer service, unlike his daughter.
- Clare, arguably the main character, is Gary's teenaged daughter. She resents being forced to work at her father's restaurant for spending money. She is lazy, greedy, and provides very poor customer service.
- Neil, initially a minor character, quickly became very popular and almost the main character of the strip. Another teenaged employee, he is timid and acne-ridden. He isn't exactly the brightest person around, either; however, he is gentle and good-hearted. In strips set outside the restaurant, Neil is sometimes seen being bullied in high school by the shorter but "tougher" Kenny. The popularity of the character may have arisen from the fact that Clare was simply a typical, sarcastic teenager while Neil was more of a sympathetic character.
- Leticia is Clare's friend and coworker. Her role in the comic is the moral compass and the voice of reason, as she is much kinder and wiser than Clare. She works at Lucky Cow to make money for college. She is an avowed vegetarian.
- Jorge, usually referred to as "Elvin", is the assistant manager at Lucky Cow. He is generally a tyrant due to his bitterness from a dotcom layoff and worthless stock options. As a result, he injects his cynicism into conversations with both employees and with customers. Still, he is kind on occasion and has a passionate hobby of knitting.

== Collections ==
- Lucky Cow (2005); ISBN 0-7407-5007-0
