= Mr. Jack =

1903-1935 American comic strip

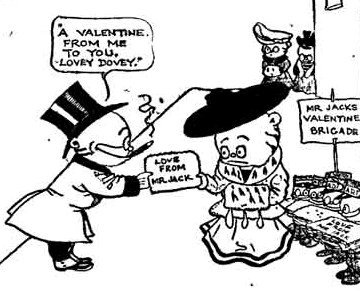
- Jimmy Swinnerton's Mr. Jack (February 12, 1905)
- Author: Jimmy Swinnerton
- Current status/schedule: Concluded weekly strip (daily 1912–c. 1919)
- Launch date: c. August 30, 1903
- End date: 1935
- Alternate name: The Escapades of Mr. Jack
- Syndicate(s): King Features Syndicate (c. 1914–1935)
- Genre: Humor

Mr. Jack is an American comic strip by Jimmy Swinnerton which ran in William Randolph Hearst newspapers from August 30, 1903, until 1935. Mr. Jack, a philandering playboy tiger, may be the first developed cartoon animal character, a type that has since become a staple in the comics medium.

The character emerged in Swinnerton's Hearst feature, The Little Tigers, which began on February 20, 1898. Mr. Jack first appeared on May 17, 1903, and took over the strip; soon, the title of the feature changed to Mr. Jack.

== History ==
Jimmy Swinnerton began his career in 1892 as a young illustrator for the San Francisco Examiner, one of William Randolph Hearst's newspapers. Starting in 1893, he drew illustrations of a cute bear cub for the paper, originally to accompany the paper's coverage of the San Francisco Mid-Winter Exposition of 1894. After the fair, Swinnerton continued to draw bear cartoons to appear with the weather forecast. The bears became popular enough that Swinnerton created a regular feature, The Little Bears, that began on June 2, 1895 and continued through June 7, 1897. This feature is apparently the first American comic strip with recurring characters.

Swinnerton's talents drew attention in the Hearst chain, and in 1898 he moved to New York City to draw cartoons for the New York Journal. Apparently at Hearst's request, he shifted his characters from bears to tigers, the emblem of Tammany Hall, creating The Little Tigers. The Tigers strip debuted on February 20, 1898.

At first fairly generic, over time individual characters began to emerge, the most popular being the womanizing playboy "Mr. Jack", who first appeared on May 17, 1903. The first use of Mr. Jack as the title of the strip was on August 30, and that title was used consistently starting with the October 4, 1903 strip.

While previous animal characters in art and fiction were often given some human features, such as clothing and speech, Swinnerton went a step further with Mr. Jack by giving him an essentially human body below his tiger head, complete with hands rather than paws and an upright stance. As such, comics historian Don Markstein wrote that he was probably "the first fully-realized funny animal", a character type that would soon become very well established in comics and other media.

Jack's rakish ways made him a target of protests that he was a bad example for children, and after 1904 his strip was moved to the sports section, seen as a more adult and male area of the paper. It also ran less frequently, as Swinnerton focused on his new strip, the more popular Little Jimmy. After a hiatus, Mr. Jack returned to the Sunday pages in January 1905, and then occasionally until January 21, 1906.

Mr. Jack was revived as a weekday strip starting October 3, 1907, although it appeared sporadically during some periods (particularly in 1912 and 1915). From March to September 1916, it appeared as The Escapades of Mr. Jack. Returning to the Mr. Jack title, the strip continued until at least 1919. The latter date is given in some sources for Swinnerton's work, though Markstein notes that some later strips depicting Jack surreptitiously drinking alcohol behind the backs of police officers appear to date them to the Prohibition era of the 1920s.

Starting January 24, 1926, Mr. Jack's strip became a topper above the Little Jimmy Sunday page and was toned down. It ran until 1935, when it was discontinued, replaced by Li'l Ole Orvie. Swinnerton continued to draw Little Jimmy until 1958, and died in 1974.

== Characters and story ==
The central character is Mr. Jack, a married but philandering tiger who would flirt with any nearby lady. His long-suffering spouse, "Wifey", often has to beg forgiveness for her husband's misbehavior, only to beat him senseless afterward. Though his shameless behavior is usually punished, generally by his wife or the boyfriends of his victims, he generally concludes that it was all worth it. On the whole, he is a popular figure among the less conservative characters in his universe: he is often seen as the jovial life of the party, charming to women and admired by men.

== Influence ==
Mr. Jack, while never as popular as Little Jimmy, still had a considerable influence. One clear derivative was Mr. George by Harold Knerr, the second author of the Katzenjammer Kids.

== Sources ==
- Barnacle Press: Mr. Jack
