= Mitzi McCoy =

American comic strip

Mitzi McCoy was the first syndicated comic strip of Kreigh Collins, the creator of Kevin the Bold. Collins was 40 years old when he created (script and art) the Sunday comic strip Mitzi McCoy, in close collaboration with Ernest Lynn, editor of the syndicate NEA, who was happy to contribute with developing views.

Mitzi McCoy made its debut on November 7, 1948, and was published in Sunday comic sections in newspapers until September 24, 1950. The comic strip was then reinvented as Kevin the Bold.

The title character in Mitzi McCoy was a young society woman, daughter of a local tycoon in the small picturesque town of Freedom. Visually she was inspired by the then popular movie star Rita Hayworth.

After the introductory episode with Mitzi McCoy in focus, the comic strip had various characters in the town, taking turns being at the center of the action. The strip was filled with various exciting action-packed episodes with more humorous interludes.
