= Lee W. Stanley =

American cartoonist

- Born: May 2, 1885 Topeka, Kansas, U.S.
- Died: February 11, 1970 (aged 84) Cleveland, Ohio
- Area: Cartoonist
- Notable works: The Old Home Town
- Spouses: Constance Louise Hamilton (m. 1907; div. 1919) Harriet H. Fisher (m. 1920)

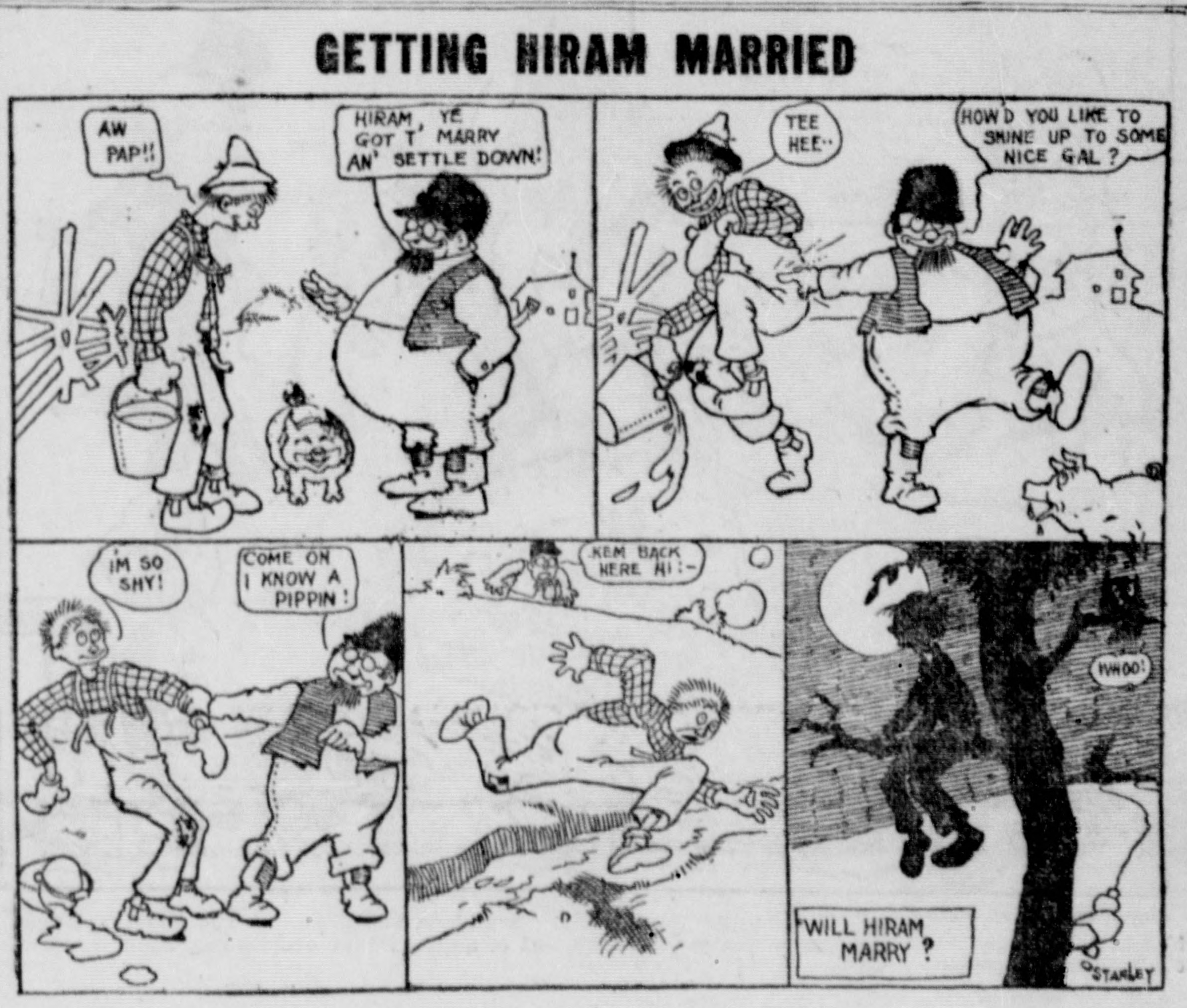
Strip for January 18, 1908

Lee Wright Stanley (May 2, 1885, in Topeka – February 11, 1970, in Cleveland) was an American cartoonist. He is best known for his long-running syndicated gag panel The Old Home Town, featuring small-town and hillbilly-type characters, which he drew for more than thirty years with his wife Harriet.

Stanley started out as an editorial cartoonist, beginning in 1903.

The Old Home Town, originally syndicated by the Central Press Association (and later by King Features Syndicate), ran from January 3, 1923, until Stanley's retirement in 1966.
