= Jimmy Swinnerton =

American cartoonist (1875–1974)

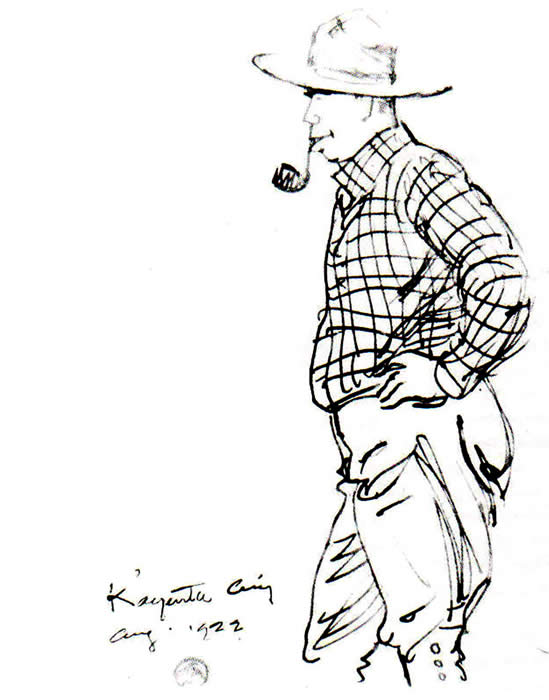
- Sketch by Maynard Dixon, 1922
- Born: November 13, 1875 Eureka, San Jose, Stockton or San Francisco, California, U.S.
- Died: September 5, 1974 (aged 98) Palm Springs, California, U.S.
- Areas: Cartooning and oil paintings
- Notable works: The Little Bears, Mr. Jack, Little Jimmy
- Spouse: Gretchen Swinnerton

James Guilford Swinnerton (November 13, 1875 – September 5, 1974) was an American cartoonist and a landscape painter of the Southwest deserts. He was known as Jimmy to some and Swinny to others. He signed some of his early cartoons Swin, and on one ephemeral comic strip he used Guilford as his signature. Experimenting with narrative continuity, he played a key role in developing the comic strip at the end of the 19th century.

== Cartoons ==
Jimmy Swinnerton's birthplace is a matter of dispute, with one gallery-owner giving Eureka, California, and another writing,

"Swinnerton has been reputed over the years to have been born [in California] in either San Francisco, Stockton, San Jose or Eureka. Because no certificate exists to provide documentation, the true location of his arrival in this world is not known. His biographer, Harold Davidson, states that 'presumptive evidence' points to Eureka. His listed date of birth November 13, 1875 was, according to Swinnerton himself, without dispute."

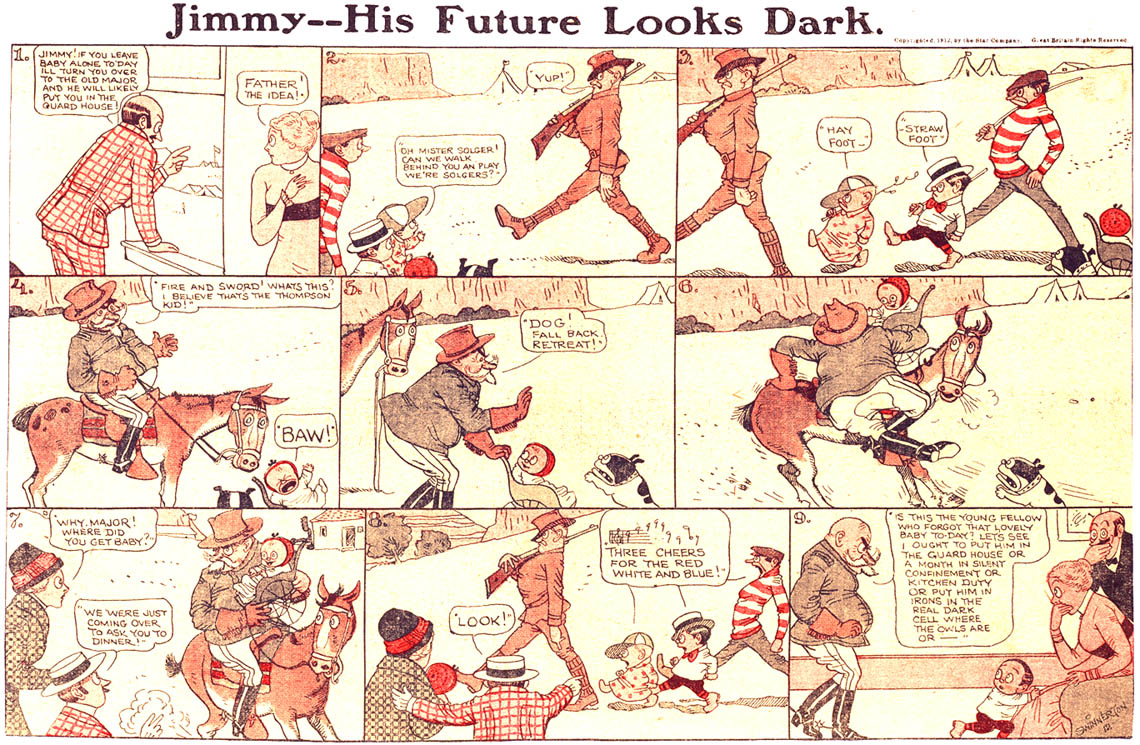
Jimmy Swinnerton's Little Jimmy (1912)

The son of Judge J. W. Swinnerton, in his early teens Jimmy provided cartoon advertisements in the windows of local businesses. He was 14 when he entered the San Francisco School of Design, where the painter Emil Carlsen was one of his instructors. He was still a teenager when he became a staff cartoonist for Hearst's San Francisco Examiner in 1892. One of his first assignments was to produce for the children's section of the newspaper a weekly cartoon, successively titled California Bears, The Little Bears and Little Bears and Tykes. Comic art historians like Robert Greenberger have called the Little Bears the first comic strip, preceding The Yellow Kid by three years. This assertion is debatable, depending on the definition of comic strip, but Swinnerton was certainly drawing multi-panel stories with speech balloons by 1900.

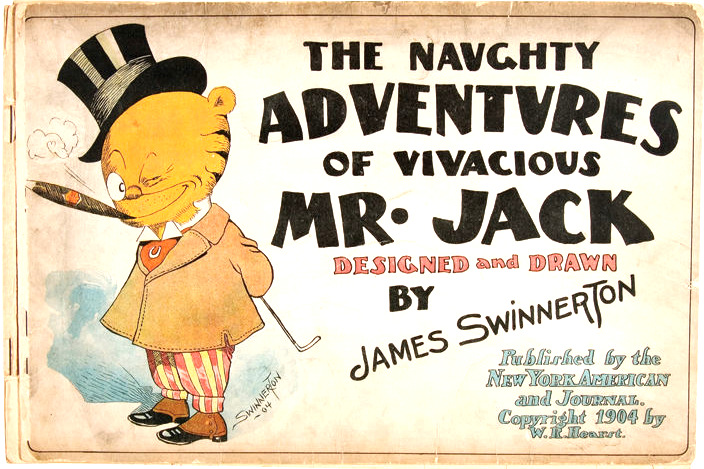
The Naughty Adventures of Vivacious Mr. Jack (1904)

In 1896, he moved to New York by invitation to produce comic strips for the Journal-American, another Hearst paper. He drew a few more Little Bears for the paper, followed by some strips with a Noah's Ark setting, referred to as Mount Ararat. He hit upon a durable theme with a series of strips featuring anthropomorphic tigers, which soon took the title Mr. Jack. As the character developed, Mr. Jack was an inveterate philanderer, to his wife's distress. Some of his misdeeds were considered unsuitable for juvenile readers. The strip had its last appearance in the Sunday comics color supplement in 1904. In a later revival (1912–19), it appeared in the editorial pages. Meanwhile, Swinnerton continued to fill his Sunday space with a new character, a scatterbrained boy named Jimmy. He drew Jimmy in various formats, eventually under the title Little Jimmy, until 1958 (with a hiatus from 1941 to 1945, during which he wrote and drew the King Features Syndicate Western strip Rocky Mason, Government Marshal, which premiered on Sunday, August 24, 1941). A peculiarity of Swinnerton's comic strips is that the dialogue appears in quotes within the speech balloons.

=== Arizona and the desert ===
About 1906, a doctor told Swinnerton that he was suffering from tuberculosis and had two weeks to live. Determined to defeat the prognosis, Swinnerton was put on a train to Colton, California, by William Randolph Hearst, who considered Swinnerton one of his favorite employees. Swinnerton recovered and stayed there. He alternated between residences in Arizona and California for most of his life. In 1941, he was living at 1261 North Laurel Avenue in Los Angeles.

The spectacular Arizona desert landscape began to influence Swinnerton's artistic output. From 1922 to 1941, he produced a series of picture stories titled Canyon Kiddies for Hearst's Good Housekeeping. The Canyon Kiddies stories usually consisted of several lush color illustrations with captions in verse.

Swinnerton joined the Bohemian Club, rose through the ranks, and was elected president in 1929. He was also a member of the California Art Club and the Academy of Western Painters. In 1940, he painted 50 backgrounds for Warner Bros. and Leon Schlesinger Productions for a Chuck Jones Merrie Melodies cartoon featuring the Canyon Kiddies, titled Mighty Hunters.

== Landscape paintings ==
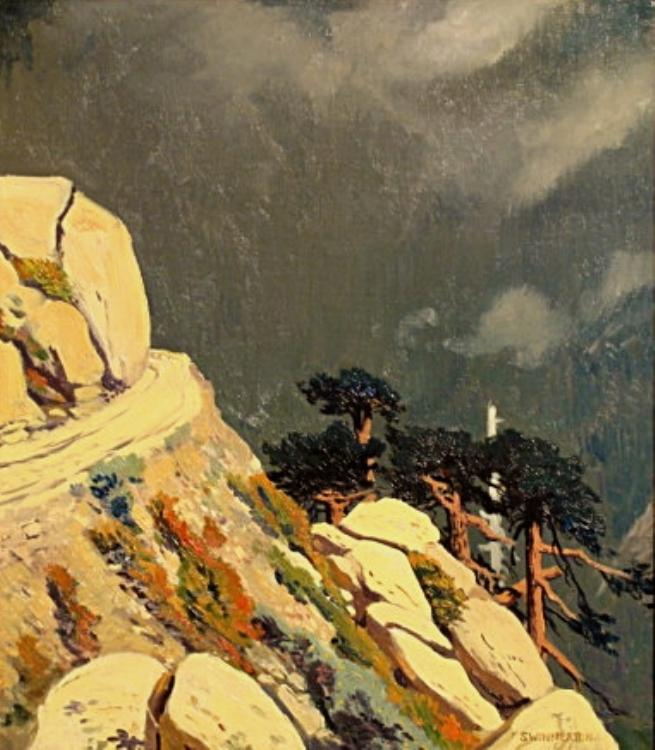
Mountain Road c.1915

Art appraiser and curator Alissa J. Anderson described Swinnerton's work as a painter after he moved to the Southwest:

During this time, he began to explore unfamiliar regions of deserts of New Mexico, Arizona, and Utah. It was here where he first became entranced by the beauty of the desert. Like many artists, the sweeping and mysterious qualities of a dry wasteland became alluring to the young artist. Soon, the magnificence of monumental desert bluffs, dramatic shadows and sweeping desert skies became the primary subject matter of his painting. Swinnerton's early paintings were highly realist, detailed depictions of an endless landscape. His subjects often focused on the exotic contradictions of the desert, a place where the parched land coexisted with thriving beauty. Many of Swinnerton's later paintings took on more minimalist qualities with a monochromatic palette of earthen tones. Often consisting of a single tree, or unadorned sand and brush, he captured the lonely, arid landscape in all its splendor.

He painted desert scenes as a fine artist from about 1920 to 1965. In later years he had a studio in the Coachella Valley near Palm Springs, and the locally published Desert Magazine expanded his renown. He also maintained a home in Palo Alto, California.

== Death and legacy ==
Jimmy Swinnerton died in Palm Springs, California, at the age of 98.

A natural arch in Monument Valley, Arizona, was named "Swinnerton Arch" in his honor.

In 2026, Swinnerton was selected for inclusion in the Eisner Hall of Fame.

== See also ==
- Carl Eytel
- Edmund C. Jaeger
