= Mark Tonra =

American cartoonist

Mark Tonra (born 1966) is an American cartoonist. He is the creator of the syndicated comic strips Jack & Tyler (1995–96), Top of the World (1998-2000), and James (2000–04). In addition to newspapers, his work has also appeared in Barron's, The National Law Journal, Omni, Health, Good Housekeeping, The Saturday Evening Post, and elsewhere. He received the National Cartoonist Society Gag Cartoon Award for 1997. Mark Tonra's celebrated characters have been published in books, magazines and newspapers in over 15 countries around the world, including Mexico, Canada, Australia, Italy, Singapore, Sweden, India, Korea, Portugal, Japan, Denmark and the United States.
