= Nate Creekmore =

American cartoonist

Nate Creekmore (born October 14, 1982, in Omaha, Nebraska) is an American cartoonist. Nate is a two-time winner of the Scripps College College Cartoonist of the Year award and an Associated Press award for achievement in college cartooning for Nate's strip Maintaining which appeared in the newspaper The Babbler at Lipscomb University in Nashville.

In May 2007, Maintaining became nationally syndicated with Universal Press Syndicate. Universal Press Syndicate offered Creekmore a stipend to spend the next year developing his comic strip which led to its spread across the United States. The strip was dropped from syndication in August 2009.

== Career ==
Creekmore embraced the way people would deal with his racial background: he found it to be funny and almost amusing.

== Maintaining ==
Creekmore created his entertaining comic strip, "Maintaining" because it shows what it means to be

"biracial in a society that prefers its people be uniracial".

Creekmore wants his comic to give a different perspective on mixed-race people. Marcus, the main character in Maintaining, is biracial and goes by the term Halfrican-American and the comic is mostly based on Creekmore's own personal experiences.
