= Joe Martin (cartoonist) =

American cartoonist

- Born: 1945 or 1946 (age 79–80); Chicago, Illinois
- Occupations: cartoonist, comic artist
- Years active: 1970s–present
- Notable work: Mister Boffo
- Spouse: Marie (m. 1972–present)
- Children: 5
- Website: www.mrboffo.com

Joe Martin (born 1945 or 1946) (Note: He was 69 in January 2015.) is an American cartoonist.

== Biography ==
Joe Martin was born in the mid 1940s on the south side of Chicago, Illinois. When he was 16 years old, he was married. By the time he was 20 years old, he had four children, but he also got a divorce. He then met his current wife, Marie, and they have been married for 43 years as of 2015. He also had two cats named Fluffy and Snuggles. Martin formerly lived in Lake Geneva, Wisconsin with his wife and five children, then moved to the Cape Fear area of North Carolina.

One of his children is illustrator and music video director Jay Martin, who also made the short-lived newspaper comic strip series "Tommy", storyboarded for numerous film projects, including the video for Michael Jackson's "You Rock My World", and wrote/illustrated the graphic novels Lost Boy and Yellow.

== Career ==
In 1976 (or 1979), (Note: Disputed date) Martin debuted his first comic strip, named Tucker, although it would only last for two years. Tucker emulated Martin's own beginning of his career by making it about a man who runs an employment agency. Martin has been able to accumulate about 1300 jokes yearly, and he has over 33,000 published since 1978. In 1998, it was common to find Martin's comic strip, Mr. Boffo, appear in the Washington Post.

== Cartoons ==
Martin is the creator of comic strips "Mister Boffo", "Porterfield", "Willy 'N Ethel", "Cats With Hands", and 25 other comic series. He is also the author of How to Hang a Spoon. Willy 'N Ethel, Martin's longest running strip, was able to celebrate its twentieth anniversary in March 2001, in addition to his cartooning career, Martin wrote for the comedy TV series, E/R.

In 2000, he was featured in the Guinness Book of World Records as the "World's Most Prolific Cartoonist."

== Exhibitions ==
In Joe Martin's first exhibition of his paintings, there was not one single person ready to buy one of his paintings. He was confident that by the end of his exhibition, there would not be one left on the wall. The prices of the art ranged from $12,000 to $28,000. The exhibit included ten various oil and acrylic paintings. His art often depicts the absurd and mocks the social norms of life.
