= The Little Bears =

American comic strip by Jimmy Swinnerton

The Little Bears (1892)

The Little Bears is an American comic strip created by Jimmy Swinnerton, one of the first American comic strips featuring talking animals and one of the first with recurring characters – the titular bears. The feature emerged from a series of spot illustrations of a bear cub that began appearing in The San Francisco Examiner starting October 14, 1893. The strip was launched as a regular feature on the children's page starting June 2, 1895, and ran through June 7, 1897.

== History ==
Jimmy Swinnerton started his career in 1892 as a young illustrator for the San Francisco Examiner, one of William Randolph Hearst's newspapers. His chief task was to provide drawings for news stories in the days before photoengraving, however, he also drew editorial cartoons and other illustrations for the paper.

In 1893, the Examiner used an illustration by Frank "Cozy" Noble of a bear as the paper's mascot for the San Francisco Mid-Winter Exposition of 1894. Following this, Swinnerton was asked to provide a bear illustration every day to accompany the paper's coverage of the fair. Swinnerton's first bear illustration appeared on October 14, 1893, and rapidly evolved into a cute little bear cub. When the fair closed, the Little Bear disappeared from the paper, but he returned on September 10, 1894, and started accompanying the weather report from October 2, 1894 until May 1895.

Starting June 2, 1895, The Little Bears became a regular feature on the children's page; each strip consisted of multiple illustrations of the bears, connected by a theme for the day. Human children were introduced to the strip on January 26, 1896, and the title changed to Little Bears & Tykes.

The Little Bears strip continued until June 7, 1897, when Swinnerton moved to New York City to draw cartoons for another Hearst paper, the New York Journal. In the Journal, Swinnerton's feature switched from bears to tigers as he launched The Little Tigers on February 20, 1898. The change of animals apparently took place at the request of Hearst. Gradually a defined, philandering character emerged from the strip, and on October 4, 1903, the Sunday feature was retitled Mr. Jack.

After Swinnerton ended the regular Little Bears strip, he continued to draw sporadic strips for the Examiner. The Little Bear continued to appear in spot cartoons and with the weather forecast for several years, drawn by other artists including Grant Wallace, Ralph Yardley and Bob Edgren.
