= Kevin the Bold =

American comic strip by Kreigh Collins

Kevin the Bold was an American comic strip that premiered on October 1, 1950, with script and art work by Kreigh Collins. In the 1960s he received script assistance from Jay Heavilin (1961) and Russell R. Winterbotham (1964-68). The Sunday only comic strip was published almost twenty years, telling the story about an Irish agent under King Henry VIII of England in the 16th century.

Kevin the Bold ran from 1950 until 1968. The main character originally appeared as a supporting character in the comic strip Mitzi McCoy, another creation of Collins, which began as a Sunday comic strip on November 7, 1948, launched by the Newspaper Enterprise Association (NEA). After less than two years into the strip, on September 24, 1950, one of the characters tells the story of Kevin, a shepherd who saves a medieval ancestor to Mitzi, Moya McCoy. The story begins in 1497, with the landing of Moorish pirates on the Irish coast, in search of slaves. The following week the comic strip changed its title to Kevin the Bold, and the supporting character Kevin became the main character in a historical adventure comic strip.

Kevin, a young Irishman, started out as a simple shepherd. He came in contact with King Henry VIII of England and performed odd missions as an agent of the king, usually accompanied by the young squire Brett (first appeared on January 20, 1952) and comrade Pedro (who debuted on August 31, 1958, and continued through to the final KTB episode).

Kevin periodically traveled beyond Europe. He journeyed to North Africa (Morocco) in 1951 and 1967, and Egypt in 1955; he made several trips to the New World—Hispaniola, 1962 and 1964, Roanoke Colony in Virginia (1965). In 1966, Kevin trekked from Montreal to California. He made brief stops in Asia—he once washed ashore in Japan (1963), spent time in Istanbul on his way back west from Japan, and one of the final KTB chapters found him in the Philippines.

The Sunday comic strip was created with a redundant comic panel in the half page, not necessary for the story, which could be removed when editing to the full page tabloid. The strip was also available in third page format.
