= Little Jimmy =

American comic strip by Jimmy Swinnerton

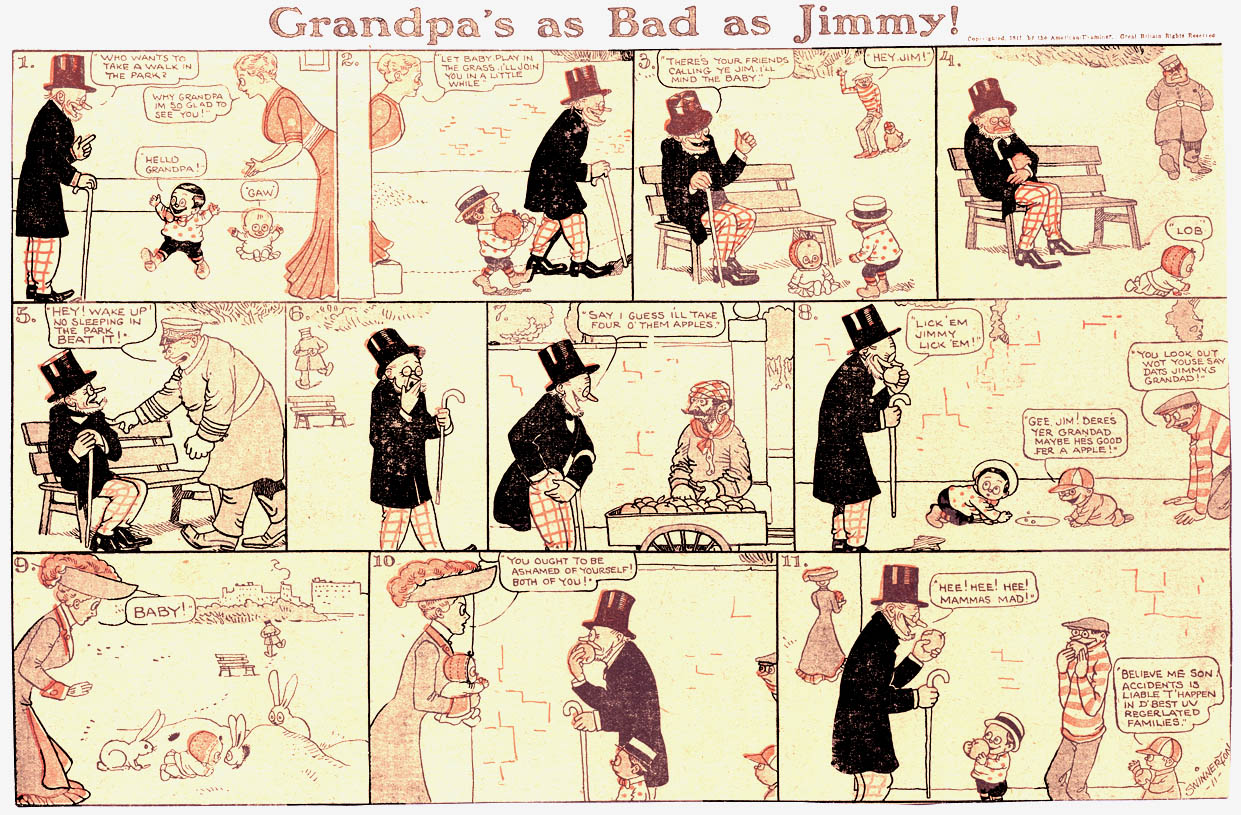
- Jimmy Swinnerton's Little Jimmy (1911)
- Author: Jimmy Swinnerton
- Current status/schedule: Concluded daily & Sunday strip
- Launch date: 14 February 1904
- End date: April 27, 1958
- Alternate name: Jimmy
- Syndicate(s): King Features Syndicate (1915–1958)
- Genre: Humor

Little Jimmy, originally titled Jimmy, is a newspaper comic strip created by Jimmy Swinnerton. With a publication history from February 14, 1904, to April 27, 1958, it was one of the first continuing features and one of the longest running.

== Characters and story ==
The title character was a little boy who was constantly forgetting what he was supposed to do and ended up getting into trouble. As comics historian Don Markstein described:

Jimmy was a wide-eyed innocent, but easy prey to the foibles of little boys. He'd constantly forget what task he was about and wander off to do boyish things, to the great consternation of the adults in his life. He also had a considerable propensity for being in the wrong place at the wrong time, which often triggered outlandishly action-packed consequences. His constant companions were his even smaller friend, Pinkey, and his dog, Beans. A supporting character added a few years later was Li'l Ol' Bear, strongly reminiscent of the cartoonist's first feature, The Little Bears.

The strip first appeared sporadically in The New York Journal. It soon became a regular in the Sunday comics section and was picked up as a feature in other newspapers owned by William Randolph Hearst. When King Features Syndicate was created in 1915, Little Jimmy went into nationwide syndication. In 1920, a daily strip was added and ran until the late 1930s. The Sunday strip continued until Swinnerton retired in 1958.

Markstein noted that Swinnerton "drew his strip in a clear, open style, unlike most cartoonists of his time. In this, he anticipated dominant styles of the 20th century, less crowded and more easily read — quite appropriate for newsprint production, where the printing isn't always as clear as it should be."

The Sunday page included several toppers over the course of the strip: Mr. Jack, a revival of a previous Swinnerton strip (January 24, 1926 - 1935), Li'l Ole Orvie and Oh, Yeah? (both 1935–1937), and Funny Films (November 1943 - 1944).

== Animation ==
Little Jimmy appeared in the 1936 Betty Boop film Betty Boop and Little Jimmy.

== Legacy ==
Little Jimmy Camp in the Angeles National Forest, near Los Angeles, California, is named after the comic strip in honor of Swinnerton, who often stayed there during the summers of 1908 and 1909. As a child, author Margaret Mitchell, best known for her seminal work Gone with the Wind, was nicknamed “Jimmy” after Little Jimmy’s main character, since she wore boy’s clothing.
