= Ad Carter =

American cartoonist (1895–1957)

Hannah and Ad Carter's Mush Stebbins and His Sister (May 24, 1953). In 1950, the title of Just Kids changed to Mush Stebbins and His Sister.

August Daniel Carter (1895–1957) was an American comic strip cartoonist who created the long-running Just Kids strip. He was known as Ad Carter, the signature he used on his strips.

Born in Baltimore, Maryland, Carter was 11 years old when he witnessed his mother's death. She was hit by a streetcar and killed as they crossed the street, a situation which impacted him deeply and ultimately led him into the work force as a youth. Later in life, he would start the Just Kids Safety Club, which encouraged looking both ways before crossing the street, in response to his mother's tragic death. While employed as a Brooklyn Eagle reporter, he met the cartoonist Clare Briggs, who encouraged him to submit a comic strip to a syndicate. In 1916, Carter drew Our Friend Mush, a strip about a gang of kids.

== Just Kids ==
In 1922, Carter was hired by William Randolph Hearst to create similar kid characters for a new strip, Just Kids. It was launched as a daily July 23, 1923, with the Sunday strip following during the next month. Later that decade, Carter began another strip, Nicodemus O'Malley, which also featured kids as the main characters. In 1950, the title of Just Kids changed to Mush Stebbins and His Sister. Comics historian Don Markstein described the Just Kids gang:

Mush Stebbins continued as part of an ensemble cast... Other regulars included Mush's pals, Fatso Dolan and Pat Chan, the latter adding a touch of racial diversity back before diversity was cool. The group functioned as a kid gang operating in and around a small town called Barnsville, sort of like the later Archie and his pals, but younger, did in Riverdale... His specific source of inspiration was Reg'lar Fellers, by Gene Byrnes, of which Just Kids was a blatant copy. This was part of the same trend as Tillie Jones's similarity to Winnie Winkle and Annie Rooney's to that other Annie. When a comic proved popular for another syndicate, Hearst usually wanted his own version of it. Just Kids even looked like Reg'lar Fellers, as Carter imitated Byrnes' art style as well as his character set-up, especially in the early days. But while the imitation was never as popular as the original, it still carved out its own place in the public consciousness. In addition to pins, dolls, games and other merchandised products, it was the subject of a coloring book in 1928 and a 16-page comic book reprint in 1932. Starting in 1934, it was the subject of at least a half-dozen Big Little Books. In the late '30s, as modern-style comic books rose to prominence, Dell Comics put it in the back pages of several of its comic strip reprints.

== Books ==
The Adventures of Just Kids was published by Saalfield in 1934. Just Kids and Deep-Sea Dan was a 1940 Big Little Book published by Whitman.

An offshoot of the National Safety Council, the Just Kids Safety Club had 413,743 boys and girls as members.

Carter was married three times. With his first wife Kathleen, he had two children, a daughter Eileen and a son Wallace. With his second wife, Florence, a daughter, Hope. His third wife, Hannah Carter, worked with him on his later strips in the 1950s. Carter died in New York in 1957.
