= Maintaining =

American comic strip by Nate Creekmore

- Author: Nate Creekmore
- Current status/schedule: Concluded daily strip
- Launch date: May 7, 2007
- End date: August 1, 2009
- Syndicate(s): Universal Press Syndicate
- Genre: Humor

Maintaining was a 2007-2009 comic strip by cartoonist Nate Creekmore.

Creekmore is a two-time winner of the Scripps College College Cartoonist of the Year award and an Associated Press award for achievement in college cartooning. Creekmore's strip first appeared in the newspaper at Lipscomb University in Nashville. Maintaining was later picked up for syndication through Universal Press Syndicate. It was launched on May 7, 2007, and canceled in August 2009 for poor sales. The last daily strip was August 1, 2009.
