= Herman (comic strip) =

Comic strip by Jim Unger

- Jim Unger's Herman (August 15, 2004)
- Author: Jim Unger
- Current status/schedule: Concluded daily & Sunday strip
- Launch date: 1975
- End date: 1992, for regularly scheduled new panels Occasional new panels from 1997-2012
- Syndicate(s): United Feature Syndicate
- Genre(s): Humor, gag-a-day, satire, adults

Herman is a comic strip written and drawn by Jim Unger. While the daily ran as a single panel with a typeset caption, it expanded every Sunday as a full multi-panel strip with balloons.

== Publication history ==
Unger's brother Bob was a major influence on the Herman comic. Herman was syndicated from 1975 to 1992, when Unger retired, running for 18 years in 600 newspapers in 25 countries.

In 1990, Herman became the first newspaper cartoon syndicated in East Germany. Shortly afterward, Unger produced a new book, Herman: Over the Wall. He joked, "Six months later the (Berlin) Wall came down; I think that's what did it."

On 2 June 1997, Herman returned to syndication with a mix of classic strip reprints and occasional new material under the United Media umbrella. "It gives me the opportunity to bring them up to date and to introduce Herman to a new generation," Unger said in the 31 May 1997, edition of the Detroit News. He did not expect to return to full-time cartooning but planned to add new material.

Unger died in 2012; reruns of Herman continue to run on Andrews McMeel Syndication's GoComics website, via the Newspaper Enterprise Association.

== Characters and story ==
The eponymous Herman is actually anybody within the confines of the strip—a man, a woman, a child, any animal or even an extraterrestrial. All characters are rendered in Unger's unique style as hulking, beetle-browed figures with pronounced noses and jaws, and often sport comically understated facial expressions.

An earlier strip, Herman, created by Clyde Lamb, published from 1949 through 1966, had no relation to Unger's strip.

== Awards ==
Unger received the National Cartoonists Society's Newspaper Panel Cartoon Award for 1982 and 1987 for his work on the strip.

== Sources ==
- Strickler, Dave. Syndicated Comic Strips and Artists, 1924-1995: The Complete Index. Cambria, California: Comics Access, 1995. ISBN 0-9700077-0-1
