= Kamala luonto =

Finnish comic strip

Kamala luonto (Finnish for "The awful nature") is a Finnish comic strip written by Jarkko Vehniäinen and Marja Lappalainen and drawn by Vehniäinen. The strip started in 2001, and in 2002 Vehniäinen submitted it to the Nordic comic strip contest in Kemi, where it made the finals but did not win. The name of the series parodies a well known Finnish nature documentary series, Avara luonto ("The ample nature"). Nowadays Kamala luonto is published in about 20 magazines and is one of the most popular comics in Finland. It is also published in Sweden, Norway and Denmark.

== Setting ==
Kamala luonto is a humorous comic strip about nature, starring various wild and tame animals. The animals' behaviour is more like that of real-world animals than is usually associated with humorous comic strips, the animals are noticeably less anthropomorphic. As an example of this, the two main characters, a weasel and a lynx, are predatory animals who enjoy hunting, and various strips show them eating their prey after they have killed it. The strips also involve some toilet humour, word play, breaking the fourth wall and popular culture references, such as to Alien and Garfield.

Some of the characters, particularly the rabbits, often speak of going to "Iloinen Leskenlehti" (Finnish for "The Happy Coltsfoot") "for a few ones". The establishment is never shown, and what the characters actually consume there is left unmentioned.

== Characters ==
- The weasel and the lynx are the main characters. They are good friends with each other, and share a passionate hobby: hunting, killing, and eating prey. They also like to joke with each other, and particularly enjoy flatulence jokes.
- The fox is crazy but sympathetic. He isn't always so bright.
- The bear is the king of the forest. He always gets his way because of his sheer size and strength.
- The beaver is a loner and an introvert and becomes emotionally moved very easily.
- The moose is, despite his bad luck, an eternal optimist. He is always desperately trying to find love.
- The pig and the sheep are tame animals, who live in a human farm. They are unaware that they are only raised to be eaten, which causes constant amusement to the main characters.
- The owl is a wise character, who acts as an advisor and counselor to the main characters.
- Rabbits appear as stock prey characters, often shown already dead. But when alive, they are the philosophers of the forest.
- Humans are rarely shown and are sometimes alluded to with their former possessions, such as rusting car wrecks or rotting carcasses of dogs. Their behaviour also is sometimes mentioned and commented, mostly being considered strange by the animals.
