= Japan and East Asia Studies Program =

Japan and East Asia Studies Program (JASEP) is an inter-departmental academic program of Japan and East Asia Studies for international students at Kwansei Gakuin University in Nishinomiya, Japan. The program is administrated through Center for International Education and Cooperation though it is sponsored by the School of Business Administration of the university.

The program offer exchange students the study programs that best suits their needs, either concentrating mainly on Japan and its language, culture and society; or widening their perspective to embrace the language and society of China or Korea.

The program begins with the Fall Semester (mid-September to mid-January), followed by the Winter Intensive Program (February to March), and ends with the Spring Semester (April to July). The JEASP has three main academic components: Japanese Language Courses (JLC), Japan Studies Courses (JSC), and China and Korea Studies Courses (CKSC); except JLC, the program courses are conducted in English. Introductory courses in the Chinese and Korean languages are also offered.

There are two student status for the program: Exchange Student and Part-time (Non-Matriculated) Student.

Exchange Student: Students enrolled in North American institutions may apply for the JEASP through the SMU-in-Japan Program, while students enrolled in other institutions, which have agreements on exchange students with KG, can apply through their home institutions. Exchange students are granted academic credits, and they receive many of the benefits, such as student discounts for train passes and concert/movie tickets.

Part-time (Non-Matriculated) Student: A limited number of international students may be accepted as part-time students. Credits are granted and an official transcript will be issued. Part-time students are allowed to take up to five courses in each of the Fall and Spring Semesters (JLC and/or JLC electives plus 4 JSC and/or CKSC.) The Winter Intensive Program, except JLC, is not available to part-time students.

The scholarship offered by the Japan Students Services Organization (JASSO) for incoming exchange students, who study in Japan for between six months and one year, is available in JEASP. This scholarship includes a monthly stipend of JP¥80,000, international travel expenses (between the home country and Osaka) and a settling-in allowance of JP¥25,000.
