= Jim Unger =

British-Canadian cartoonist (1937–2012)

- Born: James Frederick Unger; 21 January 1937 London, England
- Died: 26 May 2012 (aged 75) Saanich, British Columbia, Canada
- Area: Cartoonist
- Notable works: Herman
- Awards: National Cartoonists Society Newspaper Panel Cartoon Award (1982, 1987)

James Frederick Unger (21 January 1937 – 26 May 2012) was a British-born Canadian cartoonist, best known for his syndicated comic strip Herman which ran for 18 years in 600 newspapers in 25 countries.

== Early life ==
Unger was born in London, England, to Lillian Maud and James Unger. Unger served in the British Army, was enrolled as a London bobby, and worked as an insurance clerk and a repo man before emigrating to Canada in 1968 at the suggestion of one of his sisters. In Mississauga, Ontario he began his career as a cartoonist at the Mississauga Times newspaper. In 1974, as Herman became popular, Unger moved from Mississauga to Ottawa, Ontario, bringing his parents and brother from Britain.

== Retirement and return ==
Unger moved to the Bahamas in 1984 and retired as a cartoonist in 1992. Unger's friends encouraged him to give up retirement. He said he would not have suggested it himself, but he liked the idea. On 2 June 1997, Herman made a comeback under the United Media umbrella. "It gives me the opportunity to bring them up to date and to introduce Herman to a new generation," he said in the 31 May 1997, edition of the Detroit News. He did not expect to return to full-time cartooning but planned to add new material. Unger signed a long-term contract to bring ten years of classic Herman back to newspapers. He returned to Canada in his last years, settling in Saanich, British Columbia.

== Intraca ==
Unger was a co-founder of Intraca with David Waisglass, creator of Farcus. Intraca uses the humour of popular cartoons and motivational quotes to inform and boost employees with "positive daily business messages" on their computers. Herman characters are also found on workplace posters promoting safety and improved production.

== Books ==
In 1990, Herman became the first newspaper cartoon syndicated in East Germany. Shortly afterward, Unger produced a new book, Herman: Over the Wall. He joked, "Six months later the (Berlin) Wall came down; I think that's what did it."

== Awards ==
Unger received the National Cartoonists Society's Newspaper Panel Cartoon Award twice (1982, 1987).

== Death ==
Unger died in his sleep at his residence in Saanich, British Columbia after a period of ill health. He was predeceased by his brother Bob, who was a major influence for the Herman comic. Unger was survived by his two daughters, Karen Gooda and Jenny Hopkins, and four grandchildren as well as two sisters, Deborah and Shirley who were living in Canada, and brother Steve who was living in the UK.
