= Jasso-kissa =

Finnish comic book character by Jii Roikonen

Jasso-kissa (Finnish for "Jasso the cat") is a Finnish comic strip drawn by Jii Roikonen.

Jasso-kissa is a comical strip about an anthropomorphic cat who lives on his own more or less like a human (although he does, from time to time, have a human flatmate who used to be a circus clown). The cat, called Jasso, has a tail that acts as a separate character who has its own mind and is capable of speech. Jasso is the only named character in the entire strip.

The strip is based largely on absurd humour which deals with everyday life and on playing around with language. For example, the details of background objects often inexplicably change between panels. Texts written on background objects typically also go through several different spellings, and some small objects such as doorknobs or trashcans may change their shape to a different design.

Jasso and his tail usually speak by changing the unvoiced consonants of the Finnish language (k, p and t) to their voiced versions (g, b and d). The dialog also tends to be full of puns.
