= Kreigh Collins (cartoonist) =

American cartoonist

Kreigh Taylor Collins (January 1, 1908 – January 8, 1974), born in Davenport, Iowa, was an American cartoonist best known for the comic strip Kevin the Bold.

As a young man, Kreigh Collins was encouraged by his parents to draw. He studied art at the Cincinnati Art Academy (1924–25), but left school to pursue a career as an artist. He traveled to Paris, France with his mentor Mathias Alten in the late 1920s, where he engaged in painting. When he returned to the United States in 1931, the Great Depression made it difficult to make money, but he worked as an illustrator, salesman, illustrator in advertising and landscape painter. Collins also made a name for himself as a magazine illustrator in the 1930s.

In the 1930s, he also drew the Do You Know? panel, from September 2, 1935, to January 26, 1937. Do You Know? was similar to Ripley's Believe It or Not!, and was written by Willis Atwell and distributed by Booth Newspapers. A collection of the panels was published as a book in 1937.

Collins had a break-through in 1945 when the Methodist Publishing House asked him to draw Bible-based comics for publication in Church magazines. He drew stories about Paul, Moses, Jesus, Joseph and others, and the strip became popular not only in the United States but also in Australia and South America.

In the late 1940s, he signed for the NEA syndicate and created his first syndicated comic strip, Mitzi McCoy, launched by NEA as a Sunday comic strip November 7, 1948. Mitzi McCoy was a comic strip about a young society woman, daughter of a local tycoon in the small picturesque town of Freedom. In appearance, she was inspired by the then popular movie star Rita Hayworth.

After two years, in 1950, Mitzi McCoy underwent a sudden transformation into a medieval adventure comic strip, Kevin the Bold. Kevin was an Irish shepherd who in 1497 saved a medieval ancestor of Mitzi, Moya McCoy. Later Kevin became an Irish agent for King Henry VIII of England.

The Kevin the Bold comic strip premiered on October 1, 1950, written and drawn by Collins. In the 1960s, however, he received help with scripting from Jay Heavilin (1961) and Russell R. Winterbotham (1964-68). This comic strip was published in Sunday newspapers for almost twenty years.

In 1968, Collins began working on the comic strip Up Anchor, a story in modern setting about sailing, loosely based on his own experiences of sailing. Up Anchor was published as a Sunday comic strip until 1972.

Besides working as a cartoonist and magazine illustrator, Collins also illustrated and wrote books. In the early 60s, he wrote and illustrated two books for children (Christopher Columbus and David Livingstone), and much earlier he wrote an illustrated a book called Tricks, Toys, and Tim.

Kreigh Collins was also active creating paintings and portraits throughout his life. He painted the official portrait of Michigan Supreme Court Justice John McDonald in 1941.

Collins lived in Ada, Michigan for most of his life. He married Theresa VanderLaan in 1929 and had four sons. The Grand Rapids Public Museum holds a collection of Collins's paintings, and one of his murals is displayed in Wealthy Elementary School.
