= Bela Zaboly =

Popeye Cartoonist 1939–1959

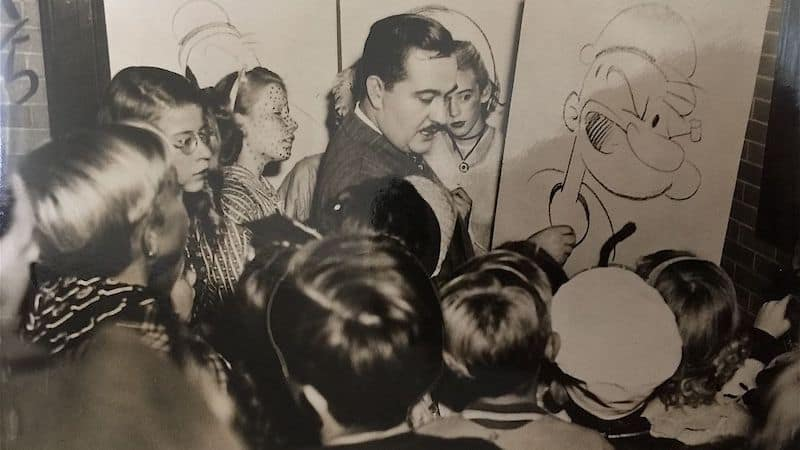
- Zaboly teaching students to draw Popeye in March 1950
- Born: Bela Pal Zaboly; May 4, 1910 Cleveland, Ohio, U.S.
- Died: April 11, 1985 (aged 74) Chagrin Falls, Ohio, U.S.
- Area: Cartoonist
- Pseudonym: Bill Zaboly
- Notable works: Popeye, Thimble Theatre, Major Hoople, Wash Tubbs, Our Boarding House, Otto Honk, and Sappo
- Spouse: Irene Elizabeth Chandas
- Children: Alwyn Zaboly, Irene Z. Church, and Marianne Z. Dodds

Signature
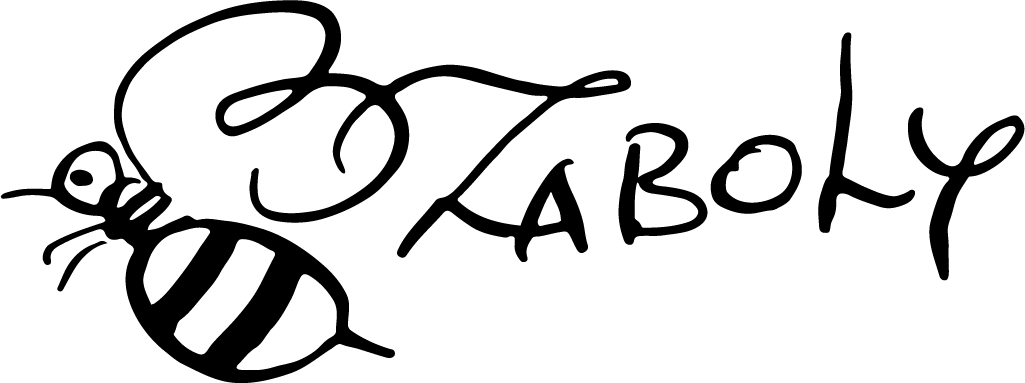

Bela Pal Zaboly (4 May 1910 – 11 April 1985), a.k.a. Bill Zaboly, was a first-generation Hungarian-American cartoonist best known for his work as the sole illustrator for the daily and weekly strips of Thimble Theatre’s Popeye from 1939 to 1959. He worked with two writers over this two-decade run leading the strip (Tom Sims & Ralph Stein). Zaboly's well-known and distinctively illustrated signature used the initials BZ with the "B" formed by the wings of a bumblebee. In headings for Thimble Theatre, his typeset credit line often used his Americanized name, Bill, rather than his Hungarian given name, Bela.

== Biography ==
Born in Cleveland, Ohio, to Hungarian immigrants, his father was a cabinet maker. Zaboly drew for his school paper in high school. He was quoted by his school newspaper as saying he “fully expects to become a professional artist one day.” He followed that dream — and after graduation, he was employed in the art department of the Cleveland-based syndicate, Newspaper Enterprise Association (NEA), where he started as an office boy and eventually became a staff cartoonist. Meanwhile, he also studied at the world-renowned Cleveland Institute of Art.

=== Early strips ===
As an illustrator, printmaker (with works in Washington D.C.’s Smithsonian) and painter, he exhibited in Cleveland and Chicago during the early 1930s, also creating the Sunday strip Otto Honk about moon-faced, dim-bulb Otto, who was variously employed as a private eye, movie stunt man and football player. Zaboly discontinued this strip in 1936. He was an assistant to Roy Crane on Wash Tubbs, and from 1936 to 1938 he drew Our Boarding House after Gene Ahern left NEA to do Room and Board for King Features Syndicate. Zaboly, his wife Irene, son, and two daughters lived in various places throughout his storied career, spending most of their time in either Connecticut (to be close to the publishers in New York), a historic mansion on North Park Blvd. in Shaker Heights, Ohio, or the family farm in Chagrin Falls, Ohio.

=== Popeye ===
After Popeye creator E. C. Segar died in 1938, Thimble Theatre was scripted by Tom Sims. Doc Winner (1884–1956), who worked in the King Features bullpen, illustrated the strip for a year until Zaboly was asked to begin illustrating the daily and Sunday strips in 1939. Zaboly and Sims produced the daily strip until 1954, and they worked on the Sunday strip until 1959. Ralph Stein began writing the daily in December 1954, alongside Zaboly as artist. Upon Zaboly’s retirement from Popeye, Bud Sagendorf was given the opportunity to draw both the daily and Sunday strips in 1958. However, his work was not published until August (daily) and September (Sunday) of 1959, after Zaboly’s backlog of final strips ran. Zaboly also continued Segar's Sappo topper strip.

Zaboly made certain changes in the strip, including the addition of new characters. However, most notably he replaced Swee'pea's nightgown with a small sailor suit, by the request of King Features. This change allowed Swee'pea to walk during the years 1957 to 1959. This was considered controversial to many fans, yet exciting for many others. However, Sagendorf later returned the character to his original appearance.

Zaboly's art was featured in many licensed Popeye items from the late 1950s through 1964, including many coloring books during this period. These items included Popeye's Presto Paints (Kenner, 1961) and Popeye's Color and Re-Color Book (Jack Built-Toys, 1957), and many others, which used all of Zaboly's art.

The last Thimble Theatre daily by Zaboly was published August 8, 1959, with his Sunday strips continuing for a few months after that. With his Thimble Theater run ending, Zaboly returned to Chagrin Falls, Ohio (a suburb of Cleveland), where he spent time working for NEA. As a hobby, he even sold art for the Alan Junkins Studio in Cleveland's Caxton building. He later attempted to launch his own syndicate, "New Features Syndicate", but was beginning to suffer from a series of mini-strokes, which forced him to retire altogether.

=== Death ===
Zaboly passed from heart disease in 1985 in Chagrin Falls, Ohio at the age of 75.

== Reprints ==
Much of Zaboly's work was reprinted in Four Color, Magic Comics, "Dagwood" and King Comics.
