= Our Boarding House =

1921–1984 American comic strip

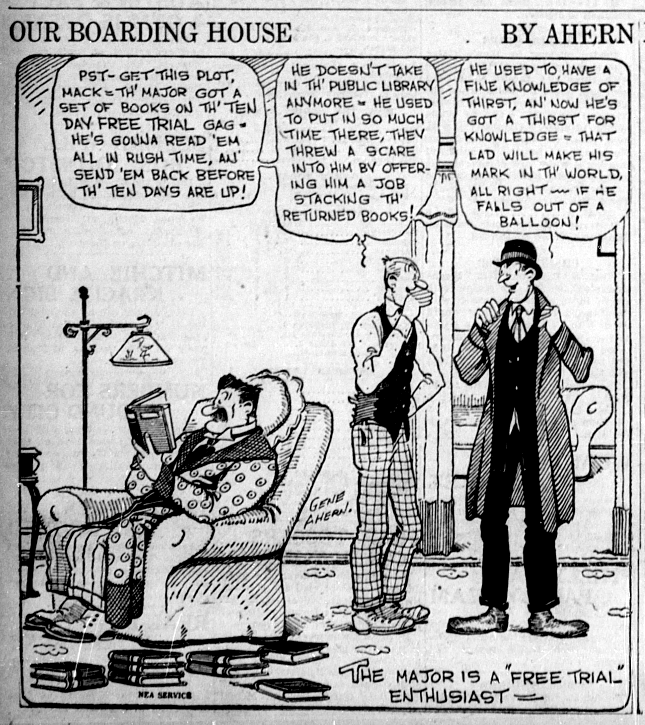
- Sample of the strip from 1923
- Author(s): Gene Ahern (1921–1936); Bill Braucher (1939–1958); Tom McCormick (1959–1984); Phil Pastoret (1977–1984; Sundays only)
- Illustrator(s): Gene Ahern (1921–1936); Bill Freyse (1939–1969); Les Carroll (1971–1984)
- Current status/schedule: Concluded daily & Sunday strip
- Launch date: October 3, 1921
- End date: December 22, 1984
- Syndicate(s): Newspaper Enterprise Association
- Genre: Humor

Our Boarding House is an American single-panel cartoon and comic strip created by Gene Ahern on October 3, 1921 and syndicated by Newspaper Enterprise Association. Set in a boarding house run by the sensible Mrs. Hoople, it drew humor from the interactions of her grandiose, tall-tale-telling husband, the self-styled Major Hoople, with the rooming-house denizens and his various friends and cronies.

After Ahern left NEA in March 1936 to create a similar feature at a rival syndicate, he was succeeded by a number of artists and writers, including Wood Cowan and Bela Zaboly, before Bill Freyse took over as Our Boarding House artist from 1939 to 1969. Others who worked on the strip included Jim Branagan and Tom McCormick. The Sunday color strip ended on March 29, 1981; the weekday panel continued until December 22, 1984.

== Publication history ==
In 1921, Gene Ahern created the comic strip Crazy Quilt, starring the Nut Brothers, Ches and Wal. That same year, NEA General Manager Frank Rostock suggested to Ahern that he use a boarding house for a setting. Ahern initially used his own experiences as a boarder while a Chicago, Illinois, art student as grist for his comic mill, and featured the picaresque peccadilloes and bickering of its residents, presided over by the no-nonsense Martha Hoople. Our Boarding House began September 16, 1921, scoring success with readers after the January 1922 arrival of the fustian, blustery Major Amos B. Hoople, Martha's husband, who'd returned after some long sojourn. "Hoople has been compared to the type created on-screen by W. C. Fields, but was probably closer to Falstaff," writes comics historian Maurice Horn. "A retired military man of dubious achievement like Shakespeare's [comic figure], he boasted of soldierly exploits that were perhaps not all invented, and his buffoonery sometimes concealed real pathos." That character depth diminished as the comic became more popular, with Major Hoople becoming "the one-dimensional figure of fun most people remember" of the strip. The primary boarders were the cynical Clyde and Mack, and the only somewhat more trusting Buster.

According to comics historian Allan Holtz, a multi-panel Sunday strip was added on December 31, 1922. This Sunday page had a series of topper strips, beginning with Boots and Her Buddies, which ran from September 12, 1926 to October 18, 1931. The next week, Ahern's The Nut Bros began, featuring loony siblings Ches and Wal in pun-filled, vaudevillian bits of business. This ran until June 6, 1965.

For some of The Nut Bros' run, there was an extra panel filled by a series of different titles running in tandem, including: Comic Scrap Book (1932), Silly Snapshots (1932–1933), One in a Million (1934–1945), Mister Blotto (1935–1946), Major Hoople - Jobs I Would Like (1936–1937), Rummy Riddles (1936–1937), Brainwavy (1938–1939), Honks from Otto Auto (1938–1939), Postcard Pests (1938–1940s), Screwy Scenarios (1943), Looney Letters (1943–1944) and Scientific Corner (1946). The panel cartoons mostly disappeared after 1946, although Mister Blotto did return sporadically until 1957.

Ahern left NEA in March 1936 to create the similar Room and Board for King Features Syndicate. Our Boarding House "passed into the hands of a bewildering array of artists and writers" including Bela "Bill" Zaboly at The Comic Strip Project, before Bill Freyse (the father of the American actress Lynn Borden) took over the art for Our Boarding House from 1939 until his death in 1969. Writer Bill Braucher scripted from 1939 to 1958, followed by Tom McCormick on the daily from 1959 on. Freyse's 1960s assistant, Jim Branagan, drew the strip from 1969 to 1971, succeeded then by Les Carroll.

The Sunday strip came to an end on March 29, 1981, and the comic continued as a daily feature until December 22, 1984, when Carroll and writer Tom McCormick retired. Others who worked on the strip included writers Wood Cowan in 1946, Tom Peoples on the Sunday strip circa 1968, and Phil Pastoret on the Sunday strip from 1977 on. The finale had Hoople finally striking it rich: a multimillion-dollar project needed a minor patent that he had obtained many years ago. In the last strip, Hoople and Martha embarked upon their new lives of wealth.

Ahern once revealed the origin of Major Hoople:

Major Hoople was based on an old fellow I knew quite well when I was growing up. He had been in the Civil War and to hear his tall stories you'd think he had advised Grant and Sherman on every move of the war, telling them exactly what to do every morning. He even insisted he had fired the first shot. He was quite a character and everyone knew him very well. He called himself "General" in spite of the fact that he had only been a top sergeant in the Army. The General was one of those men who always put up a $10 front with a dime in their pockets — a natural subject for cartooning.

== Reprints ==
Saalfield Publishing's Our Boarding House Jumbo Book (1940)

There were comic book reprints in Whitman's Crackajack Funnies and a single issue of Standard Comics' Major Hoople Comics (1943).

In 2005, Leonard G. Lee's Algrove Publishing reprinted Ahern's cartoons in Our Boarding House, 1927 as part of its Classic Reprint Series.

== In other media ==
=== Radio ===
The Major Hoople radio series began on NBC's Blue Network on June 22, 1942. With Arthur Q. Bryan in the title role, the 30-minute program aired on Mondays at 4:05 p.m. on the American West Coast and 7:05 p.m. on the East Coast. The series was written by Jerry Cady (1903–1948). Patsy Moran had the role of Hoople's wife, Martha. Conrad Binyon and Frank Bresee portrayed Hoople's "precocious little nephew", Little Alvin. Mel Blanc played the star boarder, Tiffany Twiggs. The radio series ended April 26, 1943. No recordings of the Major Hoople radio program are known to exist. (Coincidentally, Arthur Q. Bryan was the actor who first voiced the role of Elmer Fudd in the Warner Bros. cartoons, opposite Blanc's Bugs Bunny.)

=== Books ===
The Saalfield Publishing Company, the maker of Little Big Books, published Major Hoople and His Horse under the ancillary imprint Jumbo Books (listed as #SS41 1190), in 1940. The 400-page hardcover book was written and drawn by the panel's successor cartoonist Bill Freyse.

=== Music ===
In 1975, the Kitchener, Ontario, pop band known as Major Hoople's Boarding House charted a top-30 Canadian radio hit with the song "I'm Running After You". Their songs "You Girl" reached #80 in 1976, and "Someone" was #89 in 1980.

== Cultural legacy ==
Gene Ahern's Our Boarding House (December 31, 1931)

The first recording of the term "hooplehead" appears in 1980, in Dennis Smith's Glitter and Ash ("The old man said, 'Speakin' of Maureen, you know she's been acting like a real hooplehead lately, like a kid they let out of Creedmoor [Psychiatric Center] by mistake.'").

"Hooplehead", as used by the character Al Swearengen on the HBO Old West television series Deadwood, is an anachronism as it was "probably derive[d]" from Major Hoople. One etymologist, without giving citation, said, "The producer and head of the scriptwriting team, David Milch, has been reported as saying in essence that he picked something out of the air to serve as a suitable insult without great concern for its etymology. It seems he must have heard it somewhere and it came conveniently back to mind while writing the scripts.

The name "Martha Hoople" was the basis of the title Mott the Hoople, a novel by Willard Manus, and Manus's novel's title in turn inspired the name of the British rock band Mott The Hoople.

== See also ==
- Out Our Way
- H. T. Webster
