= Connie (comic strip) =

American comic strip by Frank Godwin

- Frank Godwin's Connie (1934)
- Author: Frank Godwin
- Current status/schedule: Daily and Sunday; concluded
- Launch date: April 28, 1929
- End date: February 15, 1941
- Syndicate(s): Ledger Syndicate
- Publisher: Eastern Color Printing
- Genre: Adventure
- Followed by: Rusty Riley

Connie is an American adventure comic strip created by the cartoonist Frank Godwin, who introduced a book illustration style to the comics page. The strip ran from 1929 to 1941 for the Ledger Syndicate. While most sources claim Connie debuted as a Sunday page on November 13, 1927, that is not the case. A search through newspapers.com under "Connie" and "Frank Godwin" produces no CONNIE Sundays prior to April 28, 1929. The strip was syndicated in France as Cora in the weekly paper Le Journal de Mickey.

Some sources do, however, indicate 1929 as the start date for Connie. Similarly, Maurice Horn's World Encyclopedia of Comics says that the strip lasted until 1944, but Allan Holtz's American Newspaper Comics: An Encyclopedic Reference Guide says that it "was probably just available in reprints that long."

== Characters and story ==
The strip evolved as Connie Kurridge went through various situations and occupations, including aviator, stunt pilot, charity worker, reporter and detective. Villains were fooled by her beauty and underestimated her agility and resourcefulness. Comics historian Don Markstein commented:

When Connie's daily strip began, on March 11, 1929, she became "flighty" in a different sense. There, she was played as an adventuring aviator, and the strips her series fit right in with included Tailspin Tommy, Skyroads and the early Brick Bradford—except, of course, for her gender. Connie was the first female adventure hero in American comics, the precursor to Brenda Starr, Reporter, Deathless Deer, Modesty Blaise and all the rest. Connie (last name Kurridge—sounds like "courage", get it?) was deceptively pretty, tho as a product of the flapper era, rather flat-chested compared to modern comics women. Neither villains nor readers back then expected to find an agile and resourceful brain beneath her lovely blonde curls. And she was capable of spectacular feats of derring-do, such as flying great distances cross-country in an unfamiliar plane, at night, with neither navigational equipment nor lights; or performing stunt flights in a plane she knew had recently been sabotaged.

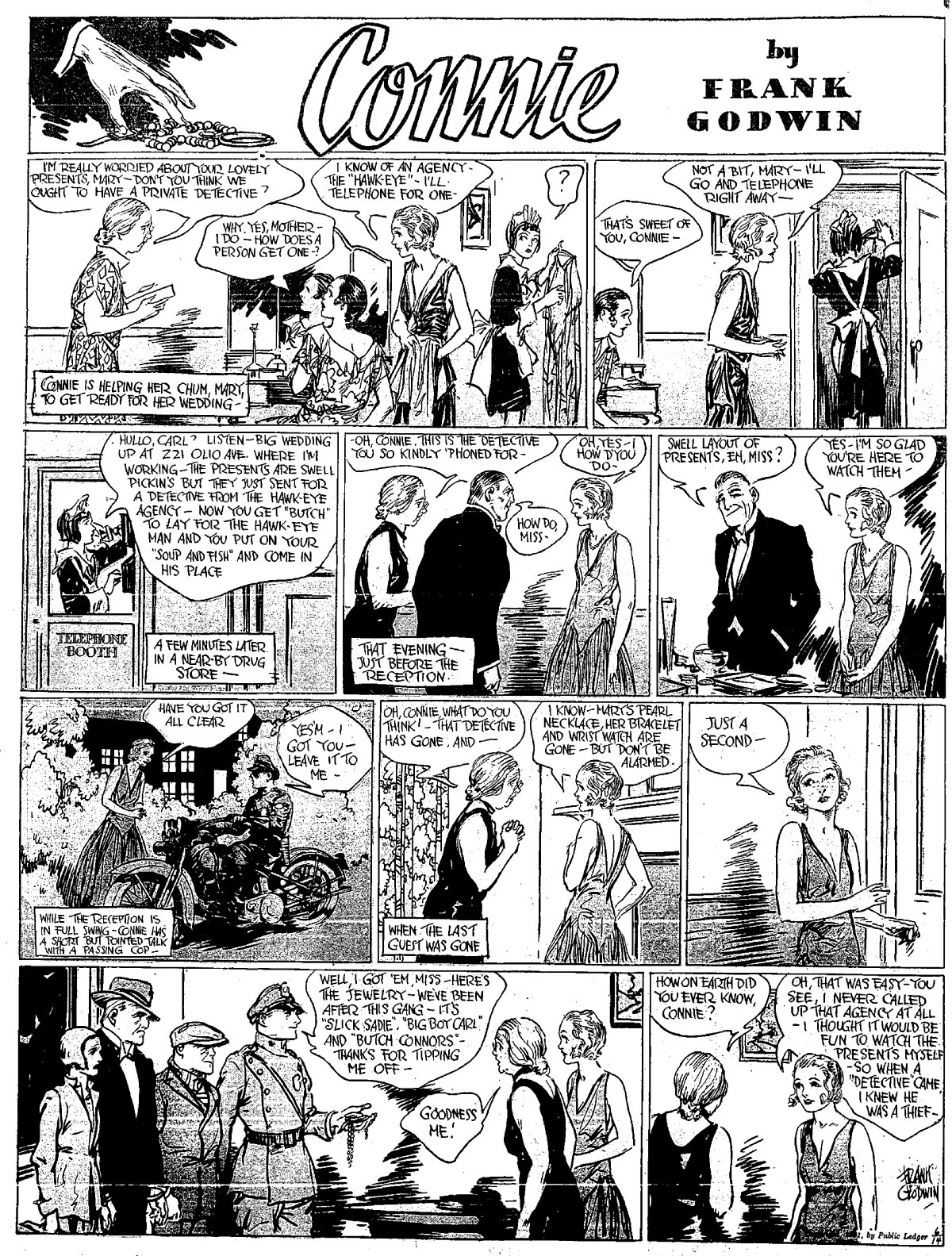
Frank Godwin's Connie (June 14, 1931).

In The World Encyclopedia of Comics, Maurice Horn wrote:

Then came the Depression and Connie turned out to be a girl with a social conscience; she helped her mother with her charity work and often visited the men on the bread lines (one of the very few instances where the Depression was graphically depicted in a comic strip)... In 1934 Connie went to work, first as a reporter, then as the operator of a detective agency (a kind of female Sam Spade)... Connie is a liberated woman: intelligent, self-reliant, at ease in all situations. Holding her own against any man, she would certainly have made a better representative for the women's movement than... Wonder Woman.

The Sunday page included two toppers during the strip's run: The Wet Blanket (November 1, 1931 - December 13, 1936) and Wonder-Land (December 20, 1936 - 1940).

== Reprints ==
The first year of the daily strips were reprinted in Connie: A Complete Compilation: 1929-1930 (1977) by Hyperion Press. The strips were reprinted in Famous Funnies, published by Eastern Color Printing. They were later collected by Pacific Comics Club in 2009–2010.
