= Le Journal de Mickey =

French Disney comics magazine

- Editor: Paul Winkler
- Categories: Comics magazine
- Frequency: Weekly
- Circulation: 150,000 (as of 2019)
- Publisher: Unique Heritage Media
- Founder: Paul Winkler
- First issue: October 21, 1934
- Country: France
- Language: French

Le Journal de Mickey is a weekly French comics magazine established in 1934, featuring Disney comics from France and around the world. The magazine is currently published by Unique Heritage Media. It is centered on the adventures of Mickey Mouse and other Disney characters but also contains other comics. Le Journal de Mickey is credited with "the birth of the modern bande dessinée". It is now the most popular French weekly magazine for children between 8 and 13 years old.

== Origins ==
Paul Winkler, owner of the Opera Mundi syndicate, distributed comic strips from King Features Syndicate in France since 1928, including the American Mickey Mouse comic strip which was published in Le Petit Parisien as Les Aventures de Mickey since October 7, 1930. In 1931, Opera Mundi began a collaboration with publisher Librarie Hachette, who published books of French bandes dessinées (comic strips). Working with Opera Mundi, Hachette published reprint collections of the Mickey Mouse comic, with prose captions instead of speech balloons, as was customary in French BD. Their two Mickey Mouse books published in 1931 were a great success, selling more than 500,000 copies.

In 1933, Winkler got the idea to create a children's newspaper. At the time, the only children's publications on the market were des Illustrés, magazines for young children with big print. Winkler was convinced that there was a youth market that wanted "a cheerful and entertaining newspaper" (un journal gai et distrayant). Winkler later said:

Mickey appeared to me designed to be the leader of a newspaper that would apply this formula because his presence on the screens started to attract an audience of all ages who had a common mind: the spirit of youth.

Winkler proposed the creation of a Mickey Mouse newspaper to various periodical publishers, who all turned him down. Finally, Robert Meunier du Houssoy of Librarie Hachette agreed to publish the paper, as long as Winkler would become the editor-in-chief. Le Journal de Mickey would be the second weekly Mickey Mouse magazine produced in the world; the first, Italy's Topolino, preceded it by two years.

== Launch ==
Le Journal de Mickey was first published on October 21, 1934. When it began, the front page of the paper was a Sunday strip of the American Mickey Mouse strip by Floyd Gottfredson, complete with its usual topper strip, Silly Symphony. In the first issue, the series launched with the March 11, 1934 Sunday page, which began the "Mickey contre l'Ogre Grognedur" ("Rumplewatt the Giant") story in Mickey Mouse, and "La Famille Vole-Au-Vent" ("Birds of a Feather") in Symphonie Folâtre (Silly Symphony). In the original Silly Symphony comic strip, the dialogue was written in rhyming couplets; Winkler considered this too childish, so the French translation was written in prose.

Initially, the magazine had eight pages, with four in color. Besides the Disney strips, the other three color pages were taken by: Pére Lacloche (Pete the Tramp) topped with Toffou (Pete's Pup), both by Clarence D. Russell; Jacques Beaunez, Policier (Needlenose Noonan) topped with Tout est bien qui finit bien (Discontinued Stories), both by Walter Hoban; and Les Malheurs d'Annie (Little Annie Rooney) topped with Si rip le dormeour revenait (Fablettes) by Brandon Walsh and Darrell McClure. The black-and-white pages featured two more half-page comics: Jim-la-Jungle (Jungle Jim) by Alex Raymond, and Qu'en Dites-Vous?, a collection of strange facts similar to the Ripley's Believe It or Not! feature.

The first issue also contained two serialized novels -- "Le Secret du Templier" ("The Templar's Secret") by Clade DaViére, and "La Main Qui Frappe" ("The Striking Hand") by Karl May—as well as a crafts column ("Le Petit Bricoleur"), collections of jokes and puns, puzzles, and a brief interview with Mickey Mouse. An international column, "Dans le Monde Entier" ("In the Whole World"), reported on new technologies around the globe, with much interest in planes, trains and cars.

The paper was an immediate success, with the first issue selling 300,000 copies; that figure would grow over the next several years. Hachette recouped their initial investment within four months. After the first issue was published, Winkler traveled to Hollywood to deliver it to Walt Disney personally.

Winkler's main innovation in children's magazine publishing was framing the imported American comic strips within a French context, with playful text material that used French puns, idioms and literary references. As a result of Le Journal de Mickey's success, older children's publications seemed out-of-date and tired, and many were either cancelled or changed to new formats between 1936 and 1939, including La Jeunesse Moderne, Le Petit Illustré, L'Intrépide, Cri-Cri and L'Épatant. Laurence Grove writes, "Publications such as L'Aventureux and L'As could attract readers with the sophisticated artwork and risqué exoticism, but they generally provided strips and only strips, and as such were unlikely to create a following, a feeling of attachment and involvement, in short a French cultural phenomenon in the way that Winckler [sic] had done through the context he had given his imports."

== Pre-war newspaper ==
Major differences with earlier French youth magazines with comics were, apart from printing American comics instead of local productions, the size of the magazine, with Mickey two to three times larger (27 by 40 cm), and the use of speech balloons instead of text captions. These comics were coupled with French stories and with reader interaction through letters, contests, and the Club Mickey.

Starting with issue #4 (November 1934), the column "Le Club Mickey" was signed by "Onc' Léon", the nom de plume for Léon Sée, a former boxing manager who had approached Winkler for a series of articles on boxing for Opera Mundi. Winkler bought Sée's series, and Sée became Winkler's partner in the early development of Le Journal de Mickey. The "Club Mickey" letters column became an irreplaceable link between the magazine and its readers, and Onc' Léon became a wise dispenser of advice. The "Club" also offered discounts on Mickey Mouse books, games and clothes.

The magazine revolutionised the French children's publications market and introduced the American comic strips on a much larger scale. A number of copycat magazines soon followed, including some launched by Winkler himself. In April 1936, Winkler published Robinson (périodique), a 16-page weekly filled with American adventure comics, and he followed this in December 1937 with Hop-là!, "L'hebdomadaire de la jeunesse moderne" (the weekly for the modern child). This period was later called the Golden Age of the BD.

Over the course of 1935, the Mickey Mouse comic strip introduced Mickey's cast of characters to the French audience, sometimes with new names. Horace Horsecollar was dubbed Chrysostome, and Clarabelle Cow was known as Yvette. Goofy was originally called Quenotte, but this was subsequently changed to Piloche, Achille Nigaudot and Goofy; the name finally came to rest as Dingo, which is the name that French audiences know today. Peg-Leg Pete debuted as Pierrot Jambe-de-Bois, and became Pat Hibulaire. Mickey, Minnie, Pluto and Donald Duck were known by their original English names.

By 1938, Mickey had a circulation of 400,000, the same as Robinson. The most successful competing magazines only had circulations of 200,000 or less, while the most successful magazines before the start of Mickey only sold about 40,000 copies a week. One of the things that set Le Journal de Mickey apart from its competitors was its production, with quality paper and ink and better printing resulting in brighter colours.

In the pre-war era, the comic strips reprinted in Le Journal de Mickey included Les Durondib et leur chien Adolphe (Dinglehoofer und His Dog Adolph) by Harold Knerr, Les Jumeaux (The Tucker Twins) and P'tit Jules (Snorky) by Clarence D. Russell, Pim-Pam-Poum! (The Captain and the Kids) by Rudolph Dirke, Luc Bradefer (Brick Bradford) by William Ritt and Clarence Gray, Richard le Téméraire (Tim Tyler's Luck) by Lyman Young, Les Petites Fables by Nicolas Anofsky, Cora (Connie) by Frank Godwin, Bernard Tempête (Don Winslow of the Navy) by Frank Victor Martinek and Leon Beroth, Marc Luron (Curley Harper at Lakespur) by Lyman Young, and Prince Vaillant (Prince Valiant) by Hal Foster.

The paper also reprinted two serialized adaptations of Disney animated films from the Silly Symphony strip: Blanche Neige et les Sept Nains (Snow White and the Seven Dwarfs) in 1938, and Pinocchio in 1940. In addition to the regular 8-page weekly, there were occasional 16-page holiday specials for Christmas, Easter and school holidays; these cost 75 centimes instead of the regular 30. For the covers, the specials reprinted the colorful Mickey Mouse Weekly covers from the UK.

World War II broke out in 1939, and France was invaded by German and Italian forces in May and June 1940. As a result, Le Journal de Mickey ceased publication on June 16, 1940 with issue #296, and relocated to Marseille in the unoccupied zone of France. Starting September 22, 1940, two of Winkler's comics magazines -- Le Journal de Mickey and Hop-là!—reappeared as the combined title Le Journal de Mickey et Hop-là Reunis. Winkler, who had published anti-Nazi editorials that attracted the attention of Reich Minister of Propaganda Joseph Goebbels, fled to the United States with his children. Winkler's wife Betty stayed in the unoccupied zone and managed the newspaper in his absence.

Circulation dropped by 86 percent, and the magazine was printed on much lower quality paper and with very limited colours. Paper shortages meant that by the end of 1941, the magazine was reduced to 4 pages of only half the original size, appearing only twice a month. As of issue #389 (July 5, 1942), American comics were dropped from the paper, including all of the Disney material, and the speech balloon comics were replaced with traditional comics with text captions. The final issue of the first run of Le Journal de Mickey appeared on July 2, 1944.

== Revival ==
After the war, Winkler returned to liberated France and continued publishing comics magazines, beginning with Hardi Présente Donald, which ran for 313 issues from March 23, 1947 to March 22, 1953. This was a large-format weekly that was similar to the pre-war Journal de Mickey -- Donald Duck comic strips took up half of the front page, and the rest of the paper was made up of King Features adventure strips, including Jim of the Jungle, Flash Gordon, Tarzan and Mandrake the Magician. Unlike the previous paper, Donald was not a big success, and was seen as old-fashioned in the post-war market. Hachette also produced a 32-page comic book, Les Belles Histoires Walt Disney for 61 issues, from May 1948 to January 1954. These printed stories from the US comic books, sometimes retraced to fit the page layout.

In 1949, France passed the "Law of 16 July 1949 on the Publications Intended for Children" (Loi du 16 juillet 1949 sur les publications destinées à la jeunesse), which discouraged the publication of American comics, partly to break the domination of American material over the French comics industry, and also to counter the perceived violence and immorality of the American strips. The Disney comics material was not affected by the law, but the other American strips printed in Donald were eventually removed, contributing to the decline of the paper.

Meanwhile, in Belgium, Armand Bigle began publishing Mickey Magazine in 1950, with great success. The weekly magazine published in Flemish and French was printed in the style of American comic books. Mickey published translated stories from the American Disney comics, as well as some original stories by Belgian creators, led by Louis Santels, known by his pen name Ténas. Based on the success of Mickey Magazine, Bigle persuaded Winkler to adopt some of his new editorial and graphic concepts, and launch a new French periodical.

== Post-war magazine ==
Le Journal de Mickey was revived in 1952 and reached the height of its success later in the same decade, with a circulation of 633,000 by 1957. This dropped in the following decades to the current 150,000, which still makes it the leading French weekly magazine for 8- to 13-years-old.

At launch, the magazine was smaller than the pre-war newspaper, with half of the pages in color, and half printed in black and red. The cover and first story were French originals, by Ténas.

As of 2019, the magazine is 60 pages long, with 30 pages of both Disney and non-Disney comics. The rest of the pages are filled with games, riddles, animal facts and other editorial content. In 2019, Hachette sold Disney Hachette Presse to Unique Heritage Media.

== Other French Disney comics ==
As of 2019, Unique Heritage Media publishes six ongoing Disney comics in addition to Le Journal de Mickey.

Mickey Junior (1985-on) is a monthly magazine aimed at kindergarten age children. It was first published as Winnie in October 1985, featuring stories about Winnie the Pooh, and was renamed Winnie et ses amis from 2012 to 2016. Starting with issue #376 in January 2017, it became Mickey Junior. The magazine features games and activities, editorial pages about animals, and stories about Mickey and his friends.

Mon Premier Journal de Mickey (2018-on) is a bimonthly magazine aimed at children just starting school, which began in April 2018. The magazine is 50 pages long, with 10 pages of comics; the rest of the content is illustrated stories, puzzles and animal facts. Some of the pages are in English, to encourage bilingual education.

Picsou Magazine (1978-on) is a bimonthly magazine primarily aimed at children 8–14 years old; it also includes features about Disney comics history of interest to fans and collectors of all ages. The magazine began in March 1972, with 116 pages. Named for Balthazar Picsou (the French name for Scrooge McDuck), the publication focuses on Duck comics. Starting in August 1978 (issue #78), the comic grew to 132 pages, and later to 148 pages. Starting with issue #542 in April 2019, the comic doubled its size, growing to 304 pages. The magazine begins with an editorial section about teen interests, including movies, video games, social networks, musicians, Japanese manga and some non-Disney comic pages; the rest of the magazine is devoted to Disney comics. Since #542, the Disney comics section is split into chapters, with the first "volume" devoted to comics by "Le maître de l'univers" (The Master of the Universe), Carl Barks. The other volumes include one "Panorama d'Auteur" section per issue spotlighting the work of another Disney creator, and the rest are grouped by theme. Each section includes several pages on Disney comics history related to the featured creator or theme, and lists the first appearance of each story in its native country and in France.

Super Picsou Géant (1983-on) is a 196-page bimonthly magazine aimed at children 8–14 years old. Started in May 1983 as a larger "géant" version of Picsou, as of 2019, it's dwarfed by Picsou's new "maxi" size. The magazine is primarily made up of Disney comics from Italy and Scandinavia, with some brief sections of puzzles and Picsou-style articles about teen fads.
