= Panel (comics) =

Individual frame of a comic

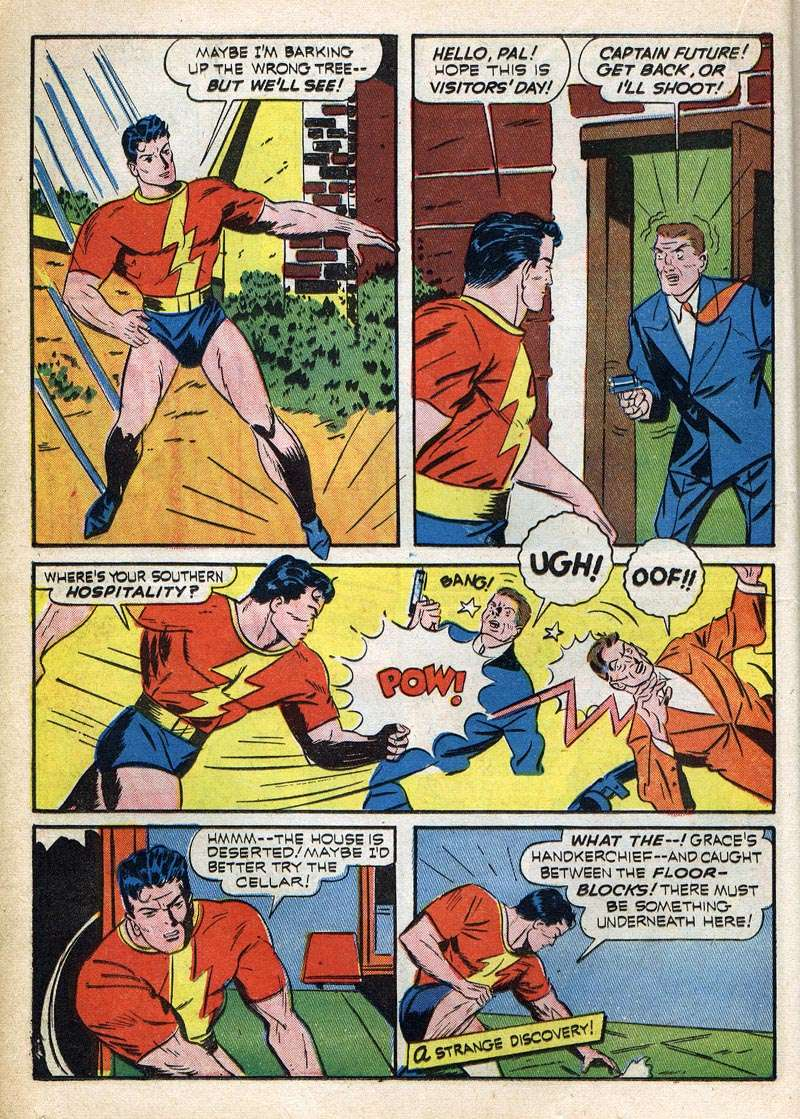
A five-panel page from a Captain Future superhero comic

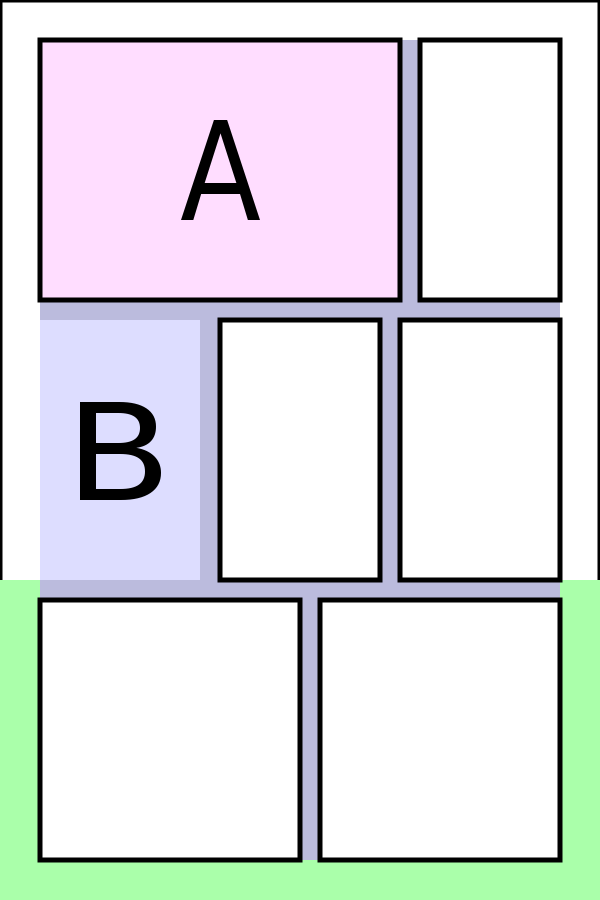
A typical comics page layout. A is a panel B is a borderless panel are the gutters is a tier

A panel is an individual frame, or single drawing, in the multiple-panel sequence of a comic strip or comic book, as well as a graphic novel. A panel consists of a single drawing depicting a frozen moment. When multiple panels are present, they are often, though not always, separated by a short amount of space called a gutter.

Newspaper daily strips typically consist of either four panels (Doonesbury, For Better or For Worse) or three panels (Garfield, Dilbert). These panels may all be of the same size, but many skilled cartoonists, such as Bill Watterson, can vary the size and number of panels in each daily strip. The horizontal newspaper strip can also employ only a single panel, as sometimes seen in Wiley Miller's Non Sequitur.

In Asia, a vertical four-panel arrangement (yonkoma) is common in newspapers, such as with Azumanga Daioh. In a comic book or graphic novel, the shapes of panels and the number of panels on a page may vary widely.

The word "panel" may also refer to a cartoon consisting of a single drawing; the usage is a shortened form of "single-panel comic". In contrast to multi-panel strips, which may involve extended dialogue in speech balloons, a typical panel comic has only one spoken line, printed in a caption beneath the panel itself. Many panel comics are syndicated and published daily, on a newspaper page with other syndicated cartoons that are collectively known as comic strips. Major comic strips in panel format include The Far Side, Dennis the Menace, The Family Circus, Ziggy, Herman and Ripley's Believe It or Not. In this context, panels are contrasted with the more common comic strip format, which consists of an actual "strip" of multiple drawings that tell a story in sequence.

== Form ==
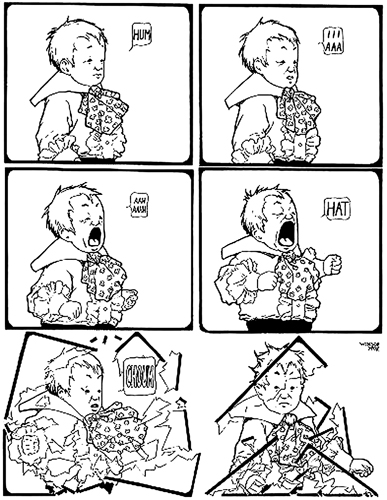
A play with panels in Winsor McCay's Little Sammy Sneeze strip.

There are two major styles used in newspaper comics, single panels and strips. Single panels are usually not broken up (though this is not always the case), and thus lack continuity. Comics such as Dennis the Menace, The Far Side, and The Family Circus are all single panels. Strips, on the other hand, are generally longer and shaped into a rectangle. Examples of strips include Calvin and Hobbes, Peanuts, and Garfield. J. R. Williams' long-run Out Our Way continued as a daily panel even after it expanded into a Sunday strip, Out Our Way with the Willets. Jimmy Hatlo's They'll Do It Every Time was often displayed in a two-panel format with the first panel showing some deceptive, pretentious, unwitting or scheming human behavior and the second panel revealing the truth of the situation.

Early daily strips were large, often running the entire width of the newspaper, and were sometimes three or more inches high. Initially, a newspaper page included only a single daily strip, usually either at the top or the bottom of the page. By the 1920s, many newspapers had a comics page on which many strips were collected together. Over decades, the size of daily strips became smaller and smaller; until by the year 2000, four standard daily strips could fit in an area once occupied by a single daily strip.

NEA Syndicate experimented briefly with a two-tier daily strip, Star Hawks, but after a few years, Star Hawks dropped down to a single tier.

In Flanders, Belgium, the two-tier strip is the standard publication style of most daily strips like Spike and Suzy and Nero. They appear Monday through Saturday; until 2003 there were no Sunday papers in Flanders. In the last decades, they have been switched from black-and-white to color.

== Usage ==
Panels in comics, are used in sequence to represent action over time. The gutter, represents the time between the panels. While panels are usually rectangular, they are not limited to one shape or size. Varying panel shapes can be used to denote, time, intensity, mood, etc. The drawings within the panels aren't constrained to the borders of the panel either. Breaking the boarders can be used for a variety of effects.

== See also ==
- Kishotenketsu
