= Bill Freyse =

American cartoonist

- Bill Freyse in an undated photo
- Born: June 12, 1898 Detroit, Michigan
- Died: March 3, 1969 (aged 70) Tucson, Arizona
- Area: Artist
- Notable works: Our Boarding House
- Spouse: Evelyn S. Freyse

William Henry Freyse (June 12, 1898 – March 3, 1969) was an American cartoonist notable for his three decades of work on Our Boarding House, syndicated by Newspaper Enterprise Association.

After Freyse graduated from the Central High School of Detroit, he began as an editorial cartoonist for the Detroit Journal. As a staff artist for the Detroit Times, he did theatrical caricature. His commercial artwork included billboards, theatre advertising and cartoons for Ford Motors.

In 1939, he took over Gene Ahern's Our Boarding House from Bela Zaboly and continued to draw it until his death in 1969. Over a 20-year period, Our Boarding House was written by William M. Braucher (1896–1958).

Others who worked on the strip included Jim Branagan and Tom McCormick. The Sunday color strip ended on March 29, 1981; the weekday panel continued until December 22, 1984.

Freyse and his wife, Evelyn S. Freyse (1908–2003), had two children, a son, Steve, and a daughter, the actress Lynn Borden. The family moved to Cleveland, Ohio, and later to Tucson, Arizona, due to Evelyn Freyse's health needs. In Tucson, Bill Freyse became a Blue Ribbon flower grower.

Freyse occasionally drew elephants into his cartoons, and his hobby was collecting elephants, as noted by Ken Hall in his column, "The Celebrity Collector":

Borden's father, the noted cartoonist Bill Freyse, was himself a lover of elephants and drew them for his (and Lynn's) amusement when she was a child.

Freyse drew the daily and Sunday panels for Our Boarding House with Major Hoople from the 1930s through the 1960s. The strips were syndicated to hundreds of newspapers nationwide. He also created the cartoon version of The Lone Ranger and co-created The Green Hornet. Artistry was his life's work, but elephants intrigued him. "My father instilled in me a great sense of wonder and respect for the elephant", Lynn said. "Elephants are great, majestic creatures, very gentle by nature, and it's true they never do forget!" The first pieces in her collection were left to her by her father, including a bronze elephant, about eight inches tall, and a pair of bronze elephants sitting back to back, their legs in the air.

== Archives ==
The Bill Freyse Cartoons collection at the Syracuse University Library has 491 original daily cartoons and 90 original Sunday cartoons from a two-year period of Our Boarding House (1966–67). The daily cartoons are in blue pencil, pen and ink on illustration board, 11 ½ x 13 ½ inches. The Sunday strips are in blue pencil, pen and ink on illustration board, 18 x 26 inches.
