= Frank Godwin =

American cartoonist (1889–1959)

- Born: October 20, 1889 Washington, D.C., U.S.
- Died: August 5, 1959 (aged 69) Paterson, New Jersey, U.S.
- Areas: Illustrator, comic strip artist
- Pseudonym: Frank
- Notable works: Connie; Rusty Riley
- Spouses: Grace Congelton (1909), Sylvia Calista Doutney
- Children: 5 total: 4 with his first wife, 1 with his second

Frank Godwin's Connie (September 1, 1935)

Francis Godwin (October 20, 1889 – August 5, 1959) was an American illustrator and comic strip artist, notable for his strip Connie and his book illustrations for Treasure Island, Kidnapped, Robinson Crusoe, Robin Hood and King Arthur. He also was a prolific editorial and advertising illustrator.

== Biography ==
Born in Washington, D.C., Godwin was the son of Harry Godwin, The Washington Star's city editor, and in 1905, at age 16, he began as an apprentice on his father's paper. Studying in New York at the Art Students League, Godwin became friends with James Montgomery Flagg and two shared a studio together. Godwin was influenced by Flagg and Charles Dana Gibson, and reflections of both can be seen in Godwin's work. Illustration historian and critic Jim Vadeboncoeur gave Godwin the highest ranking:

While obviously influenced by Flagg (and Charles Dana Gibson), Godwin managed to create a style that was recognizably his and that stood out from both his idols and the mass of clones that were cropping up everywhere. His ability to create tones, especially facial characteristics, with his pen and brush were equal to and in some ways better than Gibson and, I think, obviously superior to Flagg. His use of pen and brush in the same illustration demonstrated an understanding of the medium that set his work apart from his contemporaries. It, combined with his tonal skills, gave his work a depth and weight that was seldom equaled. Walt and Roger Reed in The Illustrator in America, 1880-1980 credit some of this realism to his modeling of busts in clay for reference. They don't say when he adopted this practice, but it's unlikely that he was doing this so early in his career.

In 1952, Godwin said, "I am a frustrated engineer." In the wood and metal shop on the ground floor of his Bucks County, Pennsylvania, studio, he built a live-steam working model locomotive measuring four feet long. He also built a six-inch telescope with an electrical device which enabled him to follow the paths of stars.

A Society of Illustrators vice-president, Godwin was a member of the National Press Club and the Dutch Treat and Salmagundi clubs.

== Comic strips ==
Godwin's two major strips, seen over three decades, were Connie (Ledger Syndicate, 1927–1944) and Rusty Riley (King Features Syndicate, 1948–1959). Most of Godwin's comic strips over the years were for the Ledger Syndicate, including Vignettes of Life (1924–1927); Connie (1927–1944); Babe Bunting (1930–1939); The Wet Blanket (c. 1933–c. 1941); War on Crime (1936–1938); and Roy Powers, Eagle Scout (1938–1940). Godwin stepped in to replace illustrator Kemp Starrett on writer Paul Powell's daily strip Roy Powers, Eagle Scout ("the official strip of the Boy Scouts of America"), continuing until 1942.

Hal Foster, Milton Caniff and Alex Raymond continue to be reprinted with regularity, while Godwin's strips are difficult to find. He receives more attention in Europe, specifically France (where Connie is usually called Cora), though even there it is quite sparse.

Godwin's working method is shown in this unfinished Rusty Riley daily.

Godwin also illustrated comic books throughout the 1940s, mostly for Lev Gleason Publications. He drew issues of Wonder Woman in 1943.

== Bibliography ==
- In Service of the Law
- Vignettes of Life (Ledger Syndicate, 1924–1927) — later continued by J. Norman Lynd until 1939
- Follies of Passing Show (1920–1926)
- self-portrait, Photoplay, July 1926, p. 66.
- Connie (Ledger Syndicate, 1927–1944)
- Babe Bunting (Ledger Syndicate, 1930–1939)
- War on Crime (Ledger Syndicate, 1936–1938)
- Roy Powers, Eagle Scout (Ledger Syndicate, 1938–1942)
- Rusty Riley (King Features, 1948–1959)
- Wonder Woman (DC Comics, 1943) – as guest-artist on Comic Cavalcade #2, Sensation Comics #16-19, and #21.
