= Clarence Russell =

Clarence Russell may refer to:

- Clarence W. Russell (died 1919), American football, basketball, and baseball coach
- Clarence D. Russell (1895–1963), American cartoonist
