= Mott the Hoople (novel) =

1966 novel by Willard Manus

- Author: Willard Manus
- Language: English
- Genre: Novel
- Published: 1966 McGraw-Hill
- Publication place: United States
- Media type: Print (Hardback & Paperback)
- Pages: 251 p. (hardcover edition)
- OCLC: 1311612

Mott the Hoople is a 1966 novel by Willard Manus and is best remembered as providing the name for a British rock group of the 1970s.

== Overview ==
The book's title is a modification of "Martha Hoople", the name of a character from the comic strip Our Boarding House, which was widely syndicated in American newspapers from 1921 to 1984. In the context of the book, the author uses the word "Hoople" to refer to squares, conventional people – those who "make the whole game possible, Christmas Clubs especially, politics, advertising agencies, pay toilets, even popes and mystery novels"."

Protagonist Norman Mott is not a Hoople, and has various adventures in the comic novel, which is a contemporary commentary on religion, war and peace, the South, race, and so forth.

== Plot ==
Norman Mott, a young man and not a Hoople, has a number of picaresque adventures.

Facing a prison sentence for refusing to be drafted into the Vietnam War, he takes a job (despite his abhorrence of regular employment) as a ticket taker for a traveling amusement fair. He moves into a boarding house where his friend Frank Pappas and two girls, midget Dolly and German immigrant Ulla, live. He has an affair with Dolly (despite already having a girlfriend, Sandra) and rejects Ulla.

He cures Sandra of her fear of sex, then spends the next year and a half in prison, which he describes as comparable to working for a major corporation, except that "here they don’t let you out at night."

After release from prison, Mott, now addicted to tranquilizer pills, returns to New York. He wanders around the city, and visits Pappas, who now works for quack evangelist Reverend Smiley Harley Gurrey. Ulla is also present, and after sleeping with Reverend Gurrey (which Pappas surreptitiously photographs) she unsuccessfully tries to induce Mott to murder her.

Mott then accompanies an African-American friend on a road trip through the southern US, where they experience racist harassment. Mott then joins Sandra and her parents (Ethel and Spencer) in Florida, Ethel being a follower of Reverend Gurrey. Mott reluctantly accepts a job at Spencer's department store; he dulls his unhappiness with the work and with becoming a Hoople using alcohol and tranquilizers. He asks Sandra to marry him.

Mott is invited to dinner with Sandra, Ethel, and Reverend Gurrey, where the latter two attempt to convert him to Christianity. Mott then facetiously attempts to convert them to Judaism, and, finally angered as Gurrey begins to say grace, begins to recite a Hebrew prayer, realizing that "I had arrived as an atheist, but they had made me a Jew."

When Ethel goes on a hunger strike to pressure Mott to convert, he goes to reason with her and ends up having sex with her. Visiting Spencer late one night, Mott inadvertently learns that he is a transvestite.

Overwhelmed, Mott returns to work, injures himself in a manner that suggests stigmata, goes on a rampage, trashes the store, and tears off his clothes. He grabs those of the nearest mannequin, which happens to be a woman's dress. Arriving home in the dress, he is met by Sandra and Ethel. Ethel, assuming he is also a crossdresser, leaves in horror and takes Sandra with her.

The next day, Mott learns that Sandra is being made to accompany Ethel to a rally Reverend Gurrey is holding in Tulsa. Mott flies to Tulsa with his disabled brother Paulie to rescue Sandra. There, Mott runs into Dolly and Ulla. He leaves Paulie with Dolly, but leaves Ulla in a terrified, near-catatonic state as the revival meeting is giving her flashbacks of Nazi rallies.

Mott, armed with stolen photos of Reverend Gurrey and Ulla having sex, storms into the revival tent and tries to leave with Sandra. As they flee the tent, Reverend Gurrey proclaims Mott to be a demon and orders the crowd to stop him. When Dolly and Paulie show up, the crowd mistakes Paulie for Mott, and Mott, unable to stop their frenzied attack, is separated from Sandra but makes his escape in one of Reverend Gurrey's hot air balloons.

== Reception ==
Josh Greenfeld wrote that the literary work "is a very winning novel, one of the funniest I've read in years, on its own poster-color, comic terms" in the 4 November 1966 issue of LIFE. He added that it "is a perfect example of the kind of novel best first examined without benefit of critical filters" and "should be approached like a trip to an amusement park: one goes to have fun, and the rides and the freaks, the cotton candy and the hot dogs are all there now for one's ready pleasure."
