= Paul Winkler (publisher) =

Paul Winkler (7 July 1898 in Budapest – 23 September 1982 in Melun) was a French writer, journalist and publisher of Jewish-Hungarian ancestry. Before being the head of Press Alliance, Winkler operated Europe's largest feature syndicate, Opera Mundi, in France.

Specializing in the distribution of bandes dessinées (French comics), Winkler founded several popular magazines. Le Journal de Mickey, first published as an 8-page weekly in October 1934, began a tradition of French Disney comics publishing that continues until the present day. Le Journal de Mickey is now a weekly 60-page magazine, with sister publications Picsou Magazine, Mickey Parade Géant, Super Picsou Géant and Mon Premier Journal de Mickey printing Disney comics in French from around the world. In honor of his dedication to publishing Disney comics, Winkler was given a posthumous Disney Legends award in 1997.

In April 1936, Winkler also published Robinson (périodique), a 16-page weekly filled with American adventure comics, and he followed this in December 1937 with Hop-là!, "L'hebdomadaire de la jeunesse moderne" (the weekly for the modern child).
