= Ralph Stein =

American cartoonist

Ralph Stein (November 13, 1909–November 27, 1994) was a writer, cartoonist and illustrator.

Ralph Stein was born in New York City on November 13, 1909, the eldest of two sons of Sarah and Jacob Stein. His parents were Russian-Jewish immigrants and their first language was Yiddish. His father was a tailor and his younger brother, Arthur Stein, was a magazine promoter. He married his wife Muriel Stein, with whom he had three children: David Stein, Jonathan "Jon" Stein, and Elizabeth "Betsy" Turco (Stein).

He began his career as a photographer and illustrator at The World-Telegram. During World War II, he was the staff cartoon editor for the U.S. Army magazine "Yank". During that time, he was co-author, with Harry Brown, of "It's a Cinch, Private Finch," a humorous book about Army life, and many of his cartoons from "Yank" were compiled into a book called "What Am I Laughing At?". On May 23, 1950, his fifteen Travelers Safety Service single-panel comics titled "Maim Street" began appearing in newspapers and were reprinted until 1961.

From 1953 to 1959, he helped draw and write the "Popeye" comic strip and illustrated "Here's How" for King Features. Stein's first daily "Popeye" strip was published December 6, 1954 and his last in August 1959. Stein's stories used very little of Popeye's supporting players, and instead took the sailor all over the world. He also returned Bluto to the daily strip beginning in 1957. Later Stein created Bluto's beard-less 'twin brother", Burlo.

Stein was the author of several books about cars, including Sports Cars of the World (1952), Treasury of the Automobile (1961), The American Automobile (1978) and The Great Cars (1967).

Other books by Ralph Stein include The Pinup From 1852 to Now and The Great Inventions.

Stein died on November 27, 1994 at the Saybrook Convalescent Hospital in Old Saybrook, Conn at age 85 after a long illness. He had lived in Connecticut for many years.
