= Topper (comic strip) =

Smaller comic strip published above or below another strip

Billy DeBeck's Barney Google (October 7, 1934), a page featuring two toppers: Bunky and the single-panel Knee-Hi-Knoodles.

A topper in comic strip parlance is a small secondary strip seen along with a larger Sunday strip. In the 1920s and 1930s, leading cartoonists were given full pages in the Sunday comics sections, allowing them to add smaller strips and single-panel cartoons to their page.

Toppers usually were drawn by the same artist as the larger strip. These strips usually were positioned at the top of the page (hence their name), but they sometimes ran beneath the main strip.

== History ==
Toppers were introduced by King Features Syndicate during the 1920s, enabling newspaper editors to claim more comic strips without adding more pages. The practice allowed newspapers to drop the topper and place another strip or an additional advertisement into the Sunday comics section. They also made it possible to reformat a strip from full-page size to tabloid size.

In 1904, Frederick Opper drew his And Her Name Was Maud, about the kicking mule Maud, into comic strips, books and animation, but on May 23, 1926, Opper positioned And Her Name Was Maud as the topper to his Happy Hooligan, and it ran along with Happy Hooligan until both strips came to a conclusion on October 14, 1932. On May 16, 1926, Harold Knerr began Dinglehoofer und His Dog, a topper to The Katzenjammer Kids, which ran until two years after his death. By 1936, to avoid any association with Hitler, the dog's name was changed from Adolph to Schnappsy (a.k.a. Schnapps). Knerr's strip was reformatted for reprints in Magic Comics in the early 1940s.

Billy DeBeck's topper for Barney Google was Parlor Bedroom and Sink, which evolved into Parlor Bedroom and Sink Starring Bunky and eventually was titled simply Bunky. In the mid-1930s, DeBeck added alongside Bunky a single-panel topper, Knee-Hi-Knoodles, depictions of kids' funny remarks (contributed by readers). Bunky spawned the catchphrase, "Youse is a viper, Fagin." A big fan of Bunky was pulp author Robert E. Howard, who liked to quote from the strip, as noted by his friend Tevis Clyde Smith:

His affection for Bunker Hill – "Youse is a viper, Fagin." Kept up with the strip, and retold it in a charming way. Liked to talk Brooklynese, and once entered a local dry goods store, and asked to see a shoitel.

== Spinoffs ==
Characters in toppers sometimes turned up in the main strip, such as Herby appearing in Smitty, and Kitty Higgins joining the cast of Moon Mullins. In a few cases, the topper introduced characters later developed into a successful Sunday page, as happened when Krazy Kat became a spin-off from The Family Upstairs and Roy Crane's Wash Tubbs appeared over J. R. Williams' Out Our Way with the Willets Sunday strip. The Wash Tubbs Sunday strip ran in that format from 1927 until 1933, when Crane launched Captain Easy as a Sunday page (featuring Wash Tubbs as a secondary character).

Gene Ahern's topper The Squirrel Cage, which ran above his Room and Board, is notable because of the repetitive use of the nonsensical question, "Nov shmoz ka pop?", which was never translated yet became a national catchphrase. As a consequence, The Squirrel Cage is today better remembered than Room and Board, despite its 17-year run.

On at least one occasion, a character exited the topper and dropped down into the main strip. This happened on April 17, 1938, when an absent-minded character in the Rosie's Beau topper realized he was in the wrong place and climbed down into the first panel of Bringing Up Father, arriving in the living room of Maggie and Jiggs. During the 1940s, Snookums ran as the topper above Bringing Up Father. In the final episode of HBO's The Pacific (2010), Robert Leckie (James Badge Dale) is seen reading Snookums.

During its long run, Pete the Tramp had several topper strips, as detailed by comic strip historian Allan Holtz:

C. D. Russell's wonderful Pete the Tramp went through a trio of topper strips on its Sunday pages. The first, Pete's Pup, was a dog strip, sort of a canine counterpart to the Mutt and Jeff topper, Cicero's Cat. The next was The Topper Twins, my favorite because the name is an in-joke to the industry term "topper". For some reason, Russell alternatively called this strip The Tucker Twins. The last topper was Snorky... It started in 1935 and is believed to have run as late as 1939. Getting an end date on these later toppers can be a Herculean task, because fewer and fewer papers printed the toppers as the decade of the 1930s wore on. In fact, I have no examples of Snorky later than 1937 in my collection; the 1939 date is based on the strip's listing in the Editor & Publisher yearbooks.

== Toppers bottom out ==
In half-page format comics, toppers at times appeared at the bottom; if removed, the remaining comic fit in a third page. Some toppers consisted of only a single panel, an example being those that accompanied Joe Palooka in the mid-1940s. Holtz notes:

It is a popular assumption in newspaper strip fan circles that World War II is what killed the toppers. I'll grant you that it was the coup de grace, but toppers were on the wane well before then. 1935 seems to be the last year when toppers are truly ubiquitous, and thereafter many papers started dropping them in favor of half-page versions of the A-list strips. Toppers become decidedly rare as of about 1940, though many cartoonists kept producing them long thereafter. Some later toppers are so rare as to make one wonder if they ever actually ran in any newspaper—the only evidence I've found of some is on original art.

And further:

You'll hear historians say that the topper strip was a victim of World War II paper shortages. Don't believe a word of it—it's the ads that killed full-page strips, and that killed the topper. World War II only exacerbated an already bad situation.

Some strips continued to supply toppers into the 1960s, and in a few cases even the 1970s. Maw Green in Little Orphan Annie was the last Sunday strip topper, except for the brief use of the topper parodies Sawdust and The Invisible Tribe in Dick Tracy. Many newspapers in the late 1980s ran Jim Davis' U.S. Acres alongside Davis' own Garfield (also the most popular comic at the time). However, both were stand-alone strips and sold separately (also, unlike most toppers, U.S. Acres also had a daily strip until very late in its run).

Some underground and alternative comic artists have used toppers in their work, though not in the context of a Sunday strip. The strip Fat Freddy's Cat appeared as a topper in the underground comic book The Fabulous Furry Freak Brothers. Tony Millionaire's weekly comic strip Maakies is perhaps the only contemporary syndicated strip to run a topper (which appears at the bottom of the main strip and lacks a consistent title). Toppers have also been used in some comics by Chris Ware and Daniel Clowes to mimic the format of a Sunday comics page. A variant of the topper, "throwaway" panels containing a "throwaway gag" (inessential to the thrust of the strip) remain common as of 2010, and allow different formats depending on available space.

== Notable toppers ==
- Alley Oop – Dinny's Family Album (1934-1937)
- Barney Google – Bughouse Fables (1926), Bunky (originally Parlor Bedroom and Sink, 1926-1948), Knee-Hi-Knoodles (single panel, 1934-1935)
- Blondie – The Family Foursome (1930-1935), Colonel Potterby and the Duchess (1935-1958, running as a stand-alone strip until 1963)
- Boob McNutt – Bertha the Siberian Cheesehound (1926, started as a topper but soon became a supporting character with Boob)
- Boots and Her Buddies – Babe 'n' Horace (1939-1968)
- Bringing Up Father – Rosie's Beau (1926-1944), Snookums (1944-1956)
- The Bungle Family – Little Brother (1926-1937), Short Stories (1937-1938)
- The Captain and the Kids – Hawkshaw the Detective (drawn by Gus Mager, 1931-1952)
- Connie – The Wet Blanket (1931-1936)
- Count Screwloose – Banana Oil, Babbling Brooks, Otto and Blotto
- Dick Tracy – Crimestopper's Textbook (1949-present, now running as a throwaway panel)
- Ella Cinders – Chris Crusty (1931-1941)
- The Family Upstairs – Krazy Kat (bottom, first Krazy Kat appearance)
- The Fabulous Furry Freak Brothers – Fat Freddy's Cat (bottom, underground imitation of vintage strip format)
- Felix the Cat – Laura (1926-1935), Bobby Dazzler (1935-1940)
- Flash Gordon – Jungle Jim (1934-1954, sometimes published as separate strip)
- Freckles and His Friends – Hector (1944-1973)
- Gasoline Alley – That Phoney Nickel (1930-1933, bottom), Little Brother Hugo (1944-1973)
- The Gumps – Cousin Juniper (1944-1955)
- Happy Hooligan – And Her Name Was Maud (1926-1932)
- Harold Teen – Josie (1935 – early 40s)
- Hollywood Johnnie – Movie Struck (1946-1948)
- Joe Palooka – Fisher's Looney Legends (1932-1933), Fisher's History of Boxing (1933-1937), Joe Palooka's Album (1938-1943), War Time Anecdotes (1943-1945)
- The Katzenjammer Kids – Dinglehoofer und His Dog (1926-1951)
- Li'l Abner – Washable Jones (1935), Advice fo' Chillun (1935-1943), Small Change (1942-1944)
- Little Annie Rooney – Ming Foo (1935-1943)
- Little Jimmy – Mr. Jack (1926–1935)
- Little Joe – Ze Gen'ral (1943-1960s)
- Little Orphan Annie – Maw Green (1933-1973) – ran along the bottom, last Sunday comics topper
- Mickey Finn – Nippie: He's Often Wrong! (1936-1946)
- Mickey Mouse – Silly Symphony (1932-1945)
- Moon Mullins – Kitty Higgins (1930-1973)
- Mutt and Jeff – Cicero's Cat (1933-1972)
- Our Boarding House – The Nut Bros: Ches and Wal (1931-1965)
- Out Our Way with the Willets – Wash Tubbs (1927-1933)
- Pete the Tramp – Pete's Pup (1932-1935), The Topper Twins (1935), Snorky (1935-1939)
- Polly and Her Pals – Dot and Dash (1926-1928, originally Damon and Pythias), Belles and Wedding Bells (1930-1943, originally Sweethearts and Wives)
- Prince Valiant – The Medieval Castle (1944-1945)
- Red Ryder – Little Beaver (1938-1946)
- Reg'lar Fellers – Daisybelle (1934-1940), Zoolie (1944-1949)
- Room and Board – The Squirrel Cage (1936-1947)
- Skippy – Always Belittlin (1926-1940)
- Smitty – Herby (1931-1974)
- Smokey Stover – Spooky (1935-1972)
- Superman – Lois Lane Girl Reporter.
- Sweeney & Son – Jinglet (1933-1960)
- Texas Slim and Dirty Dalton – Buzzy (1943-1953)
- They'll Do It Every Time – Little Iodine (spinoff, 1943-1983), Hatlo's Inferno (1953-1958)
- Thimble Theatre – Sappo (1926-1947, originally The 5:15), Popeye's Cartoon Club (1934-1935), Wimpy's Zoo's Who (1938-1940)
- Tillie the Toiler – The Van Swaggers Starring Aunt Min (1926-1943)
- Tim Tyler's Luck – Curley Harper (1935-1945)
- Toots and Casper – It's Poppa Who Pays! (1926-1956)
- Up Anchor – Water Lore (1968-1972)
- Winnie Winkle – Looie (1931-1962)
