= Comic strip =

Short serialized comics

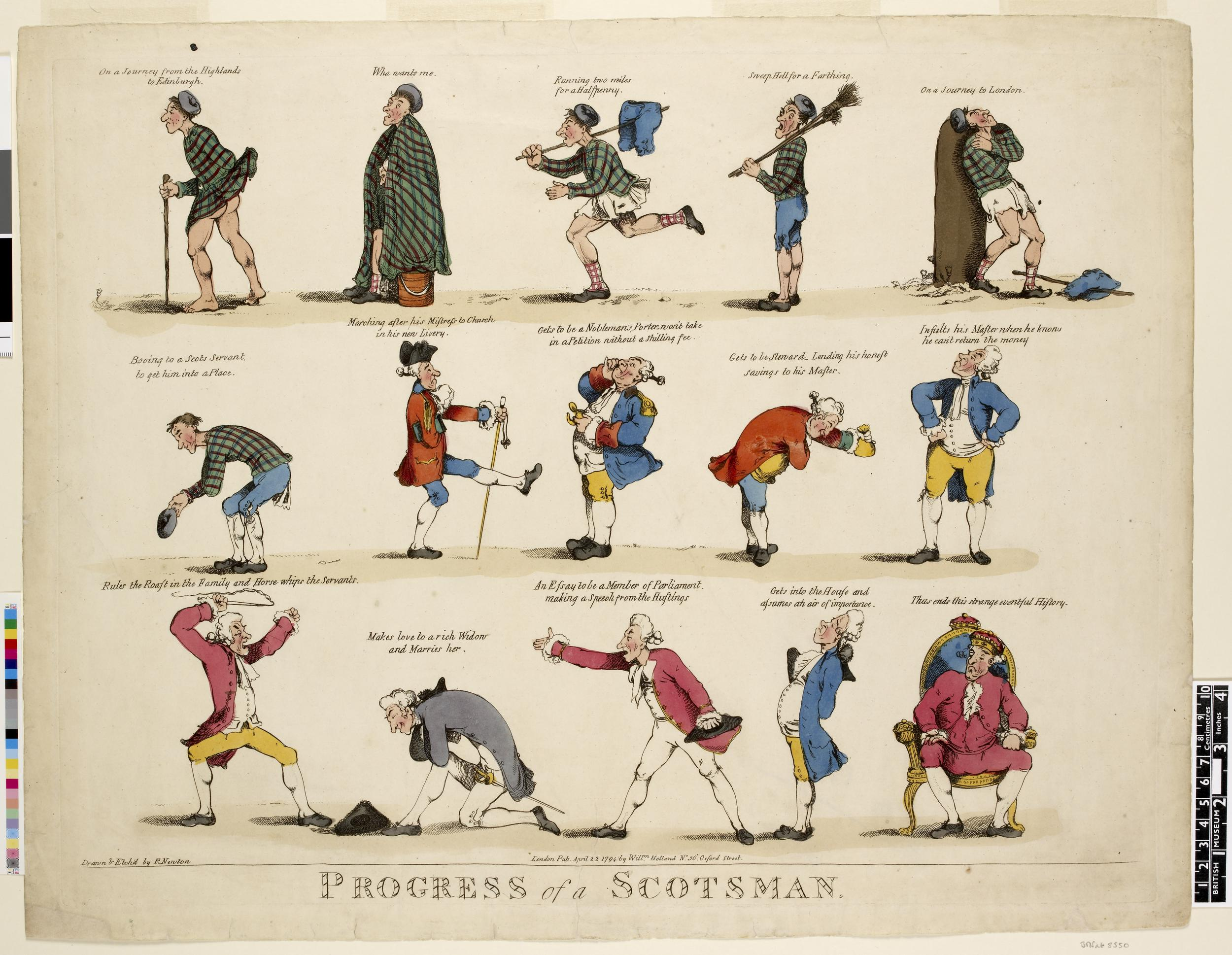
Richard Newton Progress of a Scotsman 1794 (British Museum)

A comic strip (also known as a strip cartoon) is a sequence of cartoons, arranged in interrelated panels to display brief humor or form a narrative, often serialized, with text in balloons and captions. Traditionally, throughout the 20th and into the 21st century, these have been published in newspapers and magazines, with daily horizontal strips printed in black-and-white in newspapers, while Sunday papers offered longer sequences in special color comics sections. With the advent of the internet, online comic strips began to appear as webcomics.

Most strips are written and drawn by a comics artist, known as a cartoonist. As the word "comic" implies, strips are frequently humorous but may also be dramatic or instructional. Examples of gag-a-day strips are Blondie, Bringing Up Father, Marmaduke, and Pearls Before Swine. In the late 1920s, comic strips expanded from their mirthful origins to feature adventure stories, as seen in Popeye, Captain Easy, Buck Rogers, Tarzan, and Terry and the Pirates. In the 1940s, soap-opera-continuity strips such as Judge Parker and Mary Worth gained popularity. Because "comic" strips are not always funny, cartoonist Will Eisner has suggested that sequential art would be a better genre-neutral name.

Comic strips have appeared inside American magazines such as Liberty and Boys' Life, but also on the front covers, such as the Flossy Frills series on The American Weekly Sunday newspaper supplement. In the UK and the rest of Europe, comic strips are also serialized in comic book magazines, with a strip's story sometimes continuing over three pages.

== History ==
Storytelling using a sequence of pictures has existed through history. An earthenware bowl from Iran has a sort of storyboard or comic strip, as it is decorated with one image after another showing a goat jumping towards a tree and then arriving and eating its leaves. Similar uses of sequential pictures are commonly found in medieval Islamic Persia.

A medieval European example in textile form is the Bayeux Tapestry. Printed examples emerged in 19th-century Germany and in mid 18th-century England, where some of the first satirical or humorous sequential narrative drawings were produced. William Hogarth's 18th-century English caricature include both narrative sequences, such as A Rake's Progress, and single panels.

The Biblia pauperum ("Paupers' Bible"), a tradition of picture Bibles beginning in the Late Middle Ages, sometimes depicted Biblical events with words spoken by the figures in the miniatures written on scrolls coming out of their mouths—which makes them to some extent ancestors of the modern cartoon strips.

In China, with its traditions of block printing and of the incorporation of text with image, experiments with what became lianhuanhua date back to 1884.

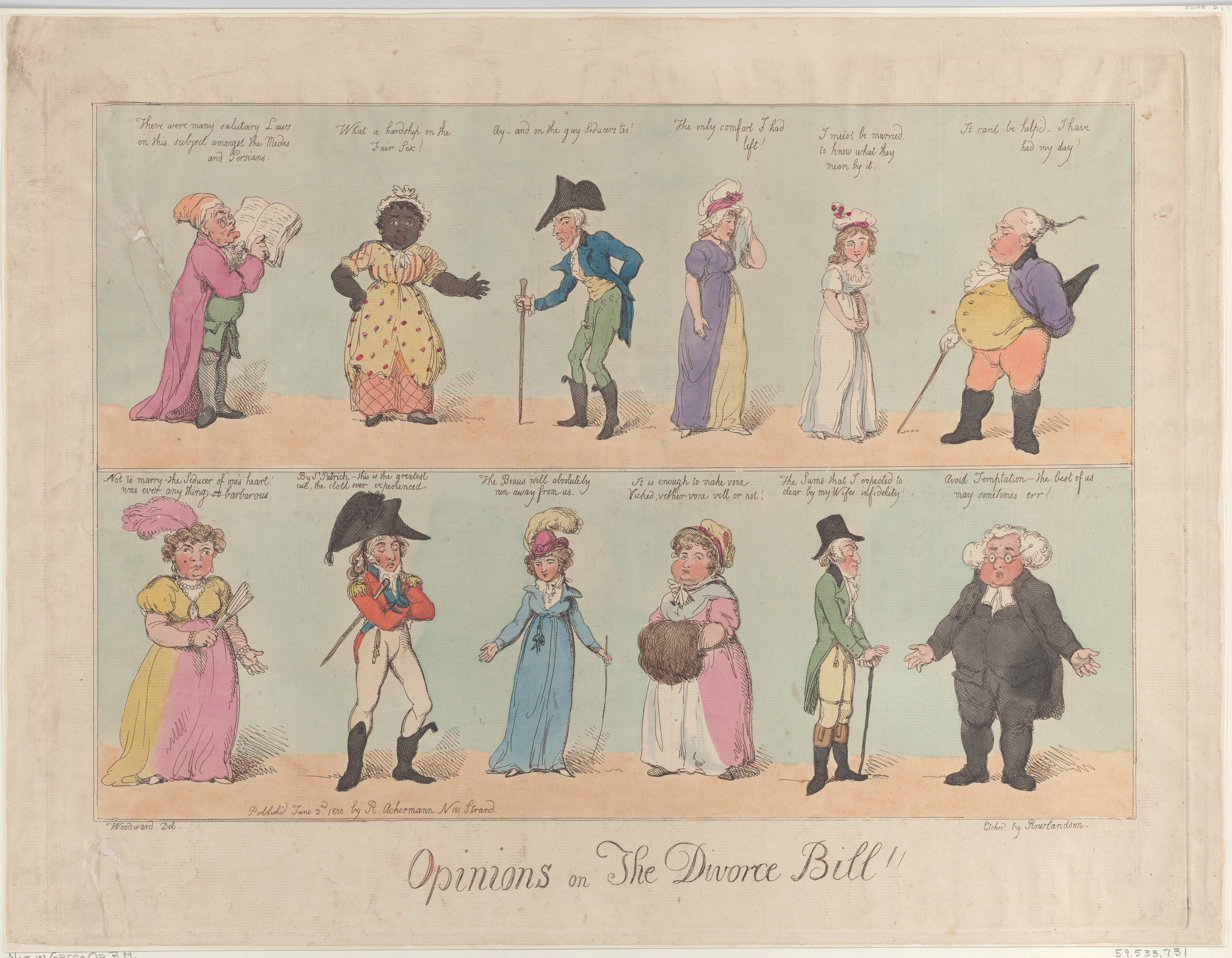
Thomas Rowlandson after G.M.Woodward. Opinions on the Divorce Bill 1800 (Metropolitan Museum, New York)

The origin of the modern English language comic strip can be traced to the efflorescence of caricature in late 18th century London. English caricaturists such as Richard Newton and George Woodward developed sophisticated caricature styles using strips of expressive comic figures with captions that could be read left to right to cumulative effect, as well as business models for advertising and selling cheap comic illustration on regular subscription.

Other leading British caricaturists produced strips as well; For example James Gillray in Democracy;-or-a Sketch of the Life of Buonaparte. His contemporary Thomas Rowlandson used strips as early as 1784 for example in The Loves of the Fox and the Badger. Rowlandson may also be credited with inventing the first internationally recognized comic strip character: Doctor Syntax whose picaresque journeys through England were told through a series of comic etchings, accompanied by verse. Originally published in parts between 1809 and 1811 in Rudolf Ackermann's Poetical Magazine, in book form The Tour of Doctor Syntax in search of the picturesque ran to 9 editions between 1812 and 1819, spun off two sequels, a prequel, numerous pirate imitations and copies including French, German, Danish and translations. His image was available on pottery, textiles wallpaper and other merchandise.

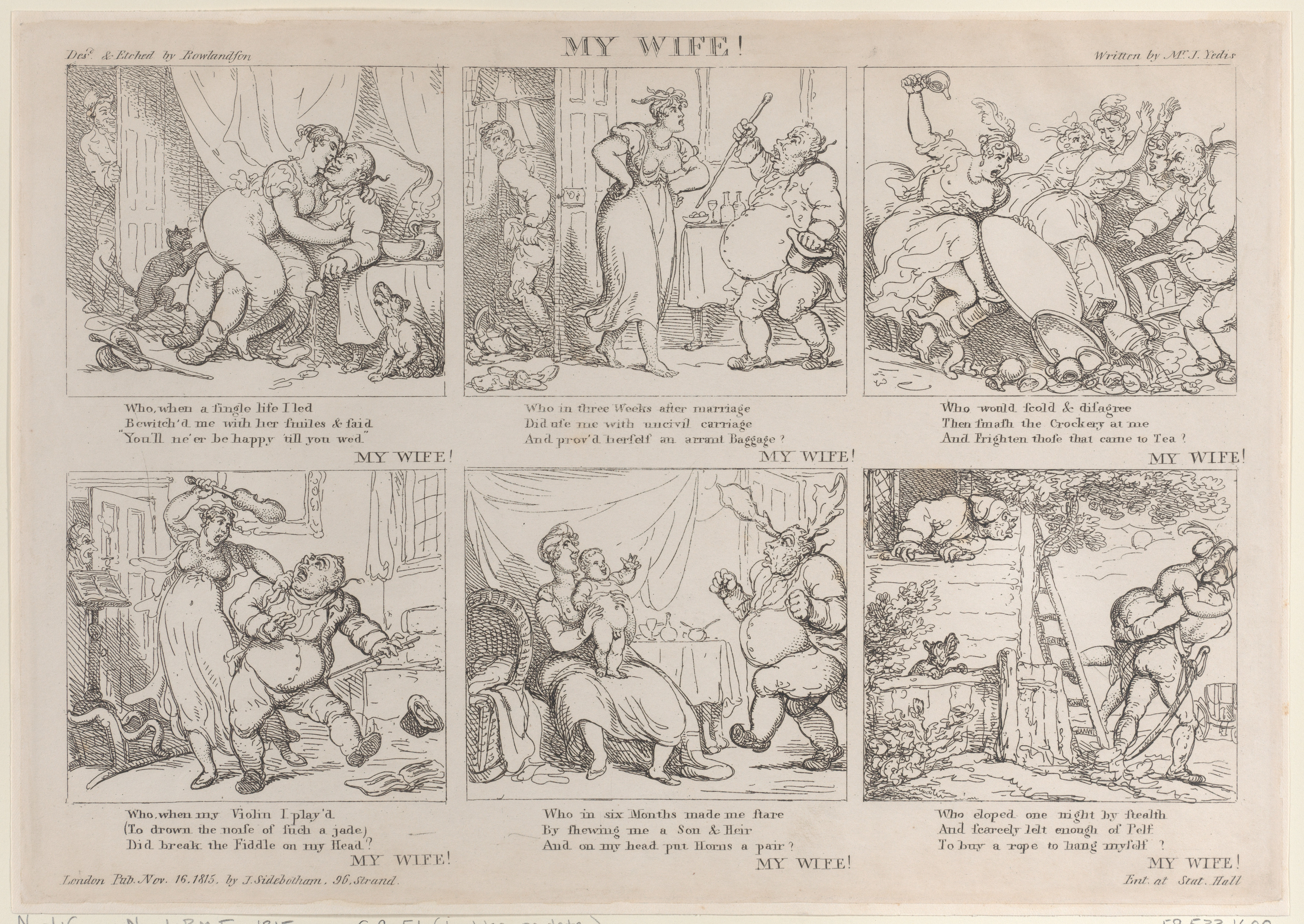
Thomas Rowlandson My Wife 1815 (Metropolitan Museum New York)

The Caricature Magazine or Hudibrastic Mirror, an influential English comic series published in London between 1807 and 1819 by Thomas Tegg included some satirical stories in comic strip format such as The Adventures of Johnny Newcome.

== Newspapers ==
The first newspaper comic strips appeared in North America in the late 19th century. The Yellow Kid is usually credited as one of the first newspaper strips. However, the art form combining words and pictures developed gradually and there are many examples which led up to the comic strip.

The Glasgow Looking Glass was the first mass-produced publication to tell stories using illustrations and is regarded as the world's first comic strip. It satirised the political and social life of Scotland in the 1820s. It was conceived and illustrated by William Heath.

Swiss author and caricature artist Rodolphe Töpffer (Geneva, 1799–1846) is considered the father of the modern comic strips. His illustrated stories such as Histoire de Mr. Vieux Bois (1827), first published in the US in 1842 as The Adventures of Obadiah Oldbuck or Histoire de Monsieur Jabot (1831), inspired subsequent generations of German and American comic artists. In 1865, German painter, author, and caricaturist Wilhelm Busch created the strip Max and Moritz, about two trouble-making boys, which had a direct influence on the American comic strip. Max and Moritz was a series of seven severely moralistic tales in the vein of German children's stories such as Struwwelpeter ("Shockheaded Peter"). In the story's final act, the boys, after perpetrating some mischief, are tossed into a sack of grain, run through a mill, and consumed by a flock of geese (without anybody mourning their demise). Max and Moritz provided an inspiration for German immigrant Rudolph Dirks, who created the Katzenjammer Kids in 1897—a strip starring two German-American boys visually modelled on Max and Moritz. Familiar comic-strip iconography such as stars for pain, sawing logs for snoring, speech balloons, and thought balloons originated in Dirks' strip.

The hugely popular Katzenjammer Kids occasioned one of the first comic-strip copyright ownership suits in the history of the medium. When Dirks left William Randolph Hearst for the promise of a better salary under Joseph Pulitzer, it was an unusual move, since cartoonists regularly deserted Pulitzer for Hearst. In a highly unusual court decision, Hearst retained the rights to the name "Katzenjammer Kids", while creator Dirks retained the rights to the characters. Hearst promptly hired Harold Knerr to draw his own version of the strip. Dirks renamed his version Hans and Fritz (later, The Captain and the Kids). Thus, two versions distributed by rival syndicates graced the comics pages for decades. Dirks' version, eventually distributed by United Feature Syndicate, ran until 1979.

In the United States, the great popularity of comics sprang from the newspaper war (1887 onwards) between Pulitzer and Hearst. The Little Bears (1893–1896) was the first American comic strip with recurring characters, while the first color comic supplement was published by the Chicago Inter-Ocean sometime in the latter half of 1892, followed by the New York Journal's first color Sunday comic pages in 1897. On January 31, 1912, Hearst introduced the nation's first full daily comic page in his New York Evening Journal. The history of this newspaper rivalry and the rapid appearance of comic strips in most major American newspapers is discussed by Ian Gordon. Numerous events in newspaper comic strips have reverberated throughout society at large, though few of these events occurred in recent years, owing mainly to the declining use of continuous storylines on newspaper comic strips, which since the 1970s had been waning as an entertainment form. From 1903 to 1905 Gustave Verbeek, wrote his comic series "The UpsideDowns of Old Man Muffaroo and Little Lady Lovekins". These comics were made in such a way that one could read the 6 panel comic, flip the book and keep reading. He made 64 such comics in total.

The longest-running American comic strips are:

#	Title	Years	Time	Ref.
1	The Katzenjammer Kids	1897–2006	109 years	
2	Gasoline Alley	1918–present	108 years	
3	Ripley's Believe It or Not!	1918–present	108 years	
4	Barney Google and Snuffy Smith	1919–present	107 years	
5	Thimble Theater / Popeye	1919–present	107 years	
6	Fritzi Ritz / Nancy	1922–present	104 years	
7	Blondie	1930–present	96 years	
8	Dick Tracy	1931–present	95 years	
9	Alley Oop	1932–present	94 years	
10	The Phantom	1936–present	90 years	
11	Prince Valiant	1937–present	89 years	
12	Mary Worth	1938–present	88 years	
13	Bringing Up Father	1913–2000	87 years	
14	Little Orphan Annie	1924–2010	86 years	
15	Henry	1934–2018	84 years	

Most newspaper comic strips are syndicated; a syndicate hires people to write and draw a strip and then distributes it to many newspapers for a fee. Some newspaper strips begin or remain exclusive to one newspaper. For example, the Pogo comic strip by Walt Kelly originally appeared only in the New York Star in 1948 and was not picked up for syndication until the following year.

Newspaper comic strips come in two different types: daily strips and Sunday strips. In the United States, a daily strip appears in newspapers on weekdays, Monday through Saturday, as contrasted with a Sunday strip, which typically only appears on Sundays. Daily strips usually are printed in black and white, and Sunday strips are usually in color. However, a few newspapers have published daily strips in color, and some newspapers have published Sunday strips in black and white.

== Popularity ==
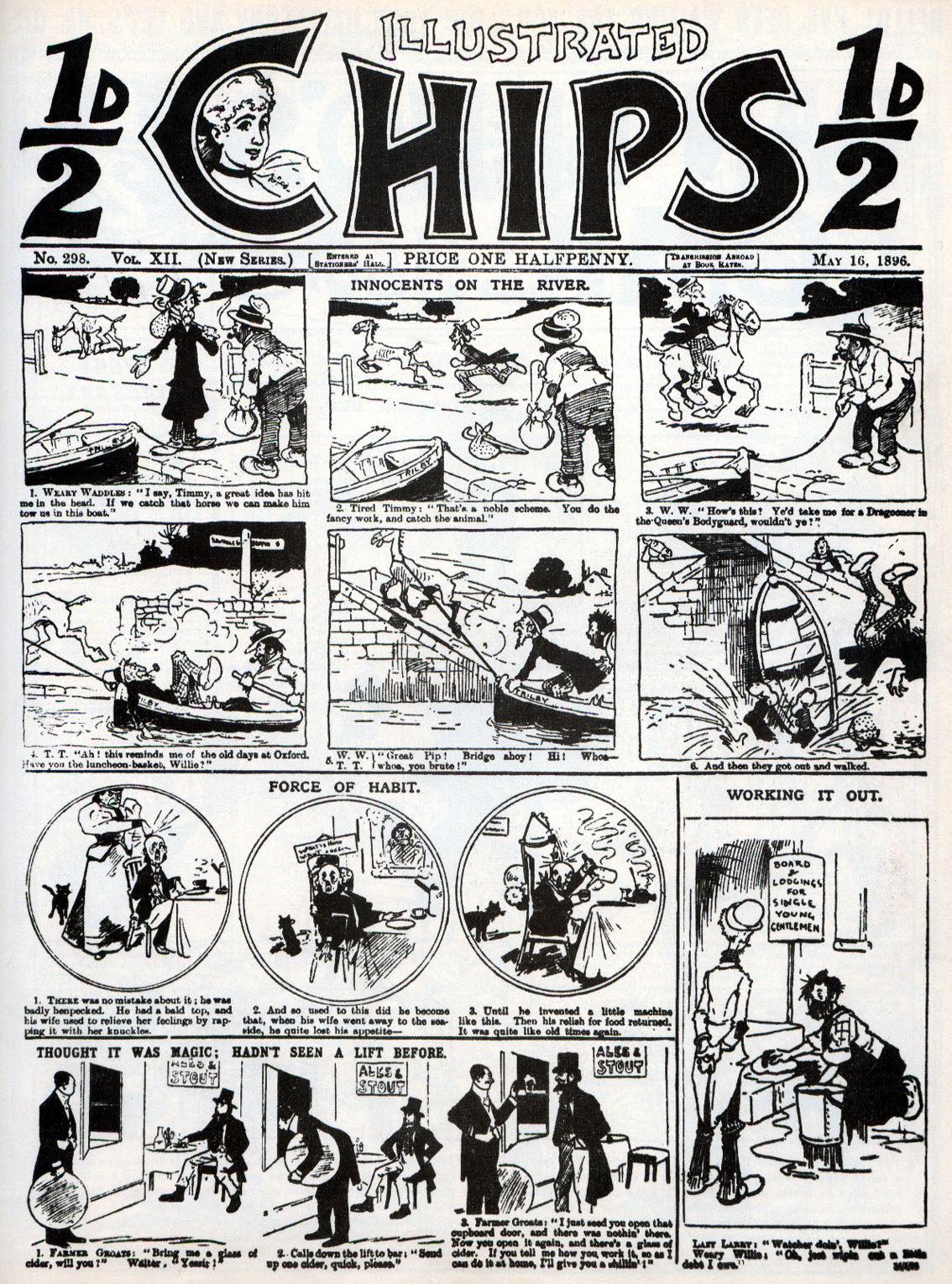
Illustrated Chips (1896). Harmsworth titles enjoyed a monopoly of comics in the UK until the emergence of DC Thomson comics in the 1930s.

Making his first appearance in the British magazine Judy by writer and fledgling artist Charles H. Ross in 1867, Ally Sloper is one of the earliest comic strip characters and he is regarded as the first recurring character in comics. The highly popular character was spun off into his own comic, Ally Sloper's Half Holiday, in 1884.

While in the early 20th century comic strips were a frequent target for detractors of "yellow journalism", by the 1920s the medium became wildly popular. While radio, and later, television surpassed newspapers as a means of entertainment, most comic strip characters were widely recognizable until the 1980s, and the "funny pages" were often arranged in a way they appeared at the front of Sunday editions. In 1931, George Gallup's first poll had the comic section as the most important part of the newspaper, with additional surveys pointing out that the comic strips were the second most popular feature after the picture page. During the 1930s, many comic sections had between 12 and 16 pages, although in some cases, these had up to 24 pages.

The popularity and accessibility of strips meant they were often clipped and saved; authors including John Updike and Ray Bradbury have written about their childhood collections of clipped strips. Often posted on bulletin boards, clipped strips had an ancillary form of distribution when they were faxed, photocopied or mailed. The Baltimore Sun's Linda White recalled, "I followed the adventures of Winnie Winkle, Moon Mullins and Dondi, and waited each fall to see how Lucy would manage to trick Charlie Brown into trying to kick that football. (After I left for college, my father would clip out that strip each year and send it to me just to make sure I didn't miss it.)"

== Production and format ==
The two conventional formats for newspaper comics are strips and single gag panels. The strips are usually displayed horizontally, wider than they are tall. Single panels are square, circular or taller than they are wide. Strips usually, but not always, are broken up into several smaller panels with continuity from panel to panel. A horizontal strip can also be used for a single panel with a single gag, as seen occasionally in Mike Peters' Mother Goose and Grimm.

Early daily strips were large, often running the entire width of the newspaper, and were sometimes three or more inches high. Initially, a newspaper page included only a single daily strip, usually either at the top or the bottom of the page. By the 1920s, many newspapers had a comics page on which many strips were collected together. During the 1930s, the original art for a daily strip could be drawn as large as 25 inches wide by six inches high. Over decades, the daily strips became smaller and smaller, until by 2000, four standard daily strips could fit in an area once occupied by a single daily strip. As strips have become smaller, the number of panels have been reduced.

Proof sheets were the means by which syndicates provided newspapers with black-and-white line art for the reproduction of strips (which they arranged to have colored in the case of Sunday strips). Michigan State University Comic Art Collection librarian Randy Scott describes these as "large sheets of paper on which newspaper comics have traditionally been distributed to subscribing newspapers. Typically each sheet will have either six daily strips of a given title or one Sunday strip. Thus, a week of Beetle Bailey would arrive at the Lansing State Journal in two sheets, printed much larger than the final version and ready to be cut apart and fitted into the local comics page." Comic strip historian Allan Holtz described how strips were provided as mats (the plastic or cardboard trays in which molten metal is poured to make plates) or even plates ready to be put directly on the printing press. He also notes that with electronic means of distribution becoming more prevalent printed sheets "are definitely on their way out."

NEA Syndicate experimented briefly with a two-tier daily strip, Star Hawks, but after a few years, Star Hawks dropped down to a single tier.

In Flanders, the two-tier strip is the standard publication style of most daily strips like Spike and Suzy and Nero. They appear Monday through Saturday; until 2003 there were no Sunday papers in Flanders. In the last decades, they have switched from black and white to color.

=== Cartoon panels ===
Jimmy Hatlo's They'll Do It Every Time was often drawn in the two-panel format as seen in this 1943 example.

Single panels usually, but not always, are not broken up and lack continuity. The daily Peanuts is a strip, and the daily Dennis the Menace is a single panel. J. R. Williams' long-run Out Our Way continued as a daily panel even after it expanded into a Sunday strip, Out Our Way with the Willets. Jimmy Hatlo's They'll Do It Every Time was often displayed in a two-panel format with the first panel showing some deceptive, pretentious, unwitting or scheming human behavior and the second panel revealing the truth of the situation.

== Sunday comics ==
Gene Ahern's The Squirrel Cage (January 3, 1937), an example of a topper strip which is better remembered than the strip it accompanied, Ahern's Room and Board.

Russell Patterson and Carolyn Wells' New Adventures of Flossy Frills (January 26, 1941), an example of comic strips on Sunday magazines.

Sunday newspapers traditionally included a special color section. Early Sunday strips (known colloquially as "the funny pages/papers", shortened to "the funnies"), such as Thimble Theatre and Little Orphan Annie, filled an entire newspaper page, a format known to collectors as full page. Sunday pages during the 1930s and into the 1940s often carried a secondary strip by the same artist as the main strip. No matter whether it appeared above or below a main strip, the extra strip was known as the topper, such as The Squirrel Cage which ran along with Room and Board, both drawn by Gene Ahern.

During the 1930s, the original art for a Sunday strip was usually drawn quite large. For example, in 1930, Russ Westover drew his Tillie the Toiler Sunday page at a size of 17" × 37". In 1937, the cartoonist Dudley Fisher launched the innovative Right Around Home, drawn as a huge single panel filling an entire Sunday page.

Full-page strips were eventually replaced by strips half that size. Strips such as The Phantom and Terry and the Pirates began appearing in a format of two strips to a page in full-size newspapers, such as the New Orleans Times Picayune, or with one strip on a tabloid page, as in the Chicago Sun-Times. When Sunday strips began to appear in more than one format, it became necessary for the cartoonist to allow for rearranged, cropped or dropped panels. During World War II, because of paper shortages, the size of Sunday strips began to shrink. After the war, strips continued to get smaller and smaller because of increased paper and printing costs. The last full-page comic strip was the Prince Valiant strip for 11 April 1971.

Comic strips have also been published in Sunday newspaper magazines. Russell Patterson and Carolyn Wells' New Adventures of Flossy Frills was a continuing strip series seen on Sunday magazine covers. Beginning January 26, 1941, it ran on the front covers of Hearst's American Weekly newspaper magazine supplement, continuing until March 30 of that year. Between 1939 and 1943, four different stories featuring Flossy appeared on American Weekly covers.

Sunday comics sections employed offset color printing with multiple print runs imitating a wide range of colors. Printing plates were created with four or more colors—traditionally, the CMYK color model: cyan, magenta, yellow and "K" for black. With a screen of tiny dots on each printing plate, the dots allowed an image to be printed in a halftone that appears to the eye in different gradations. The semi-opaque property of ink allows halftone dots of different colors to create an optical effect of full-color imagery.

== Underground comic strips ==
The decade of the 1960s saw the rise of underground newspapers, which often carried comic strips, such as Fritz the Cat and The Fabulous Furry Freak Brothers. Zippy the Pinhead initially appeared in underground publications in the 1970s before being syndicated. Bloom County and Doonesbury began as strips in college newspapers under different titles, and later moved to national syndication. Underground comic strips covered subjects that are usually taboo in newspaper strips, such as sex and drugs. Many underground artists, notably Vaughn Bode, Dan O'Neill, Gilbert Shelton, and Art Spiegelman went on to draw comic strips for magazines such as Playboy, National Lampoon, and Pete Millar's CARtoons. Jay Lynch graduated from undergrounds to alternative weekly newspapers to Mad and children's books.

== Webcomics ==
Webcomics, also known as online comics and internet comics, are comics that are available to read on the Internet. Many are exclusively published online, but the majority of traditional newspaper comic strips have some Internet presence. King Features Syndicate and other syndicates often provide archives of recent strips on their websites. Some, such as Scott Adams, creator of Dilbert, include an email address in each strip.

== Conventions and genres ==
Most comic strip characters do not age throughout the strip's life, but in some strips, like Lynn Johnston's award-winning For Better or For Worse, the characters age as the years pass. The first strip to feature aging characters was Gasoline Alley.

The history of comic strips also includes series that are not humorous, but tell an ongoing dramatic story. Examples include The Phantom, Prince Valiant, Dick Tracy, Mary Worth, Modesty Blaise, Little Orphan Annie, Flash Gordon, and Tarzan. Sometimes these are spin-offs from comic books, for example Superman, Batman, and The Amazing Spider-Man.

A number of strips have featured animals as main characters. Some are non-verbal (Marmaduke, The Angriest Dog in the World), some have verbal thoughts but are not understood by humans, (Garfield, Snoopy in Peanuts), and some can converse with humans (Bloom County, Calvin and Hobbes, Mutts, Citizen Dog, Buckles, Get Fuzzy, Pearls Before Swine, and Pooch Cafe). Other strips are centered entirely on animals, as in Pogo and Donald Duck. Gary Larson's The Far Side was unusual, as there were no central characters. Instead The Far Side used a wide variety of characters including humans, monsters, aliens, chickens, cows, worms, amoebas, and more. John McPherson's Close to Home also uses this theme, though the characters are mostly restricted to humans and real-life situations. Wiley Miller not only mixes human, animal, and fantasy characters, but also does several different comic strip continuities under one umbrella title, Non Sequitur. Bob Thaves's Frank & Ernest began in 1972 and paved the way for some of these strips, as its human characters were manifest in diverse forms—as animals, vegetables, and minerals.

== Social and political influence ==
The comics have long held a distorted mirror to contemporary society, and almost from the beginning have been used for political or social commentary. This ranged from the conservative slant of Harold Gray's Little Orphan Annie to the unabashed liberalism of Garry Trudeau's Doonesbury. Al Capp's Li'l Abner espoused liberal opinions for most of its run, but by the late 1960s, it became a mouthpiece for Capp's repudiation of the counterculture of the 1960s.

Pogo used animals to particularly devastating effect, caricaturing many prominent politicians of the day as animal denizens of Pogo's Okeefenokee Swamp. In a fearless move, Pogo's creator Walt Kelly took on Joseph McCarthy in the 1950s, caricaturing him as a bobcat named Simple J. Malarkey, a megalomaniac who was bent on taking over the characters' birdwatching club and rooting out all undesirables. Kelly also defended the medium against possible government regulation in the McCarthy era. At a time when comic books were coming under fire for supposed sexual, violent, and subversive content, Kelly feared the same would happen to comic strips. Going before the Congressional subcommittee, he proceeded to charm the members with his drawings and the force of his personality. The comic strip was safe for satire.

During the early 20th century, comic strips were widely associated with publisher William Randolph Hearst, whose papers had the largest circulation of strips in the United States. Hearst was notorious for his practice of yellow journalism, and he was frowned on by readers of The New York Times and other newspapers which featured few or no comic strips. Hearst's critics often assumed that all the strips in his papers were fronts for his own political and social views. Hearst did occasionally work with or pitch ideas to cartoonists, most notably his continued support of George Herriman's Krazy Kat. An inspiration for Bill Watterson and other cartoonists, Krazy Kat gained a considerable following among intellectuals during the 1920s and 1930s.

Some comic strips, such as Doonesbury and Mallard Fillmore, may be printed on the editorial or op-ed page rather than the comics page because of their regular political commentary. For example, the August 12, 1974 Doonesbury strip was awarded a 1975 Pulitzer Prize for its depiction of the Watergate scandal. Dilbert is sometimes found in the business section of a newspaper instead of the comics page because of the strip's commentary about office politics, and Tank McNamara often appears on the sports page because of its subject matter. Lynn Johnston's For Better or For Worse created an uproar when Lawrence, one of the strip's supporting characters, came out of the closet.

== Publicity and recognition ==
The world's longest comic strip is 88.9-metre (292 ft) long and on display at Trafalgar Square as part of the London Comedy Festival. The London Cartoon Strip was created by 15 of Britain's best known cartoonists and depicts the history of London.

The Reuben, named for cartoonist Rube Goldberg, is the most prestigious award for U.S. comic strip artists. Reuben awards are presented annually by the National Cartoonists Society (NCS).

In 1995, the United States Postal Service issued a series of commemorative stamps, Comic Strip Classics, marking the comic-strip centennial.

Today's strip artists, with the help of the NCS, enthusiastically promote the medium, which since the 1970s (and particularly the 1990s) has been considered to be in decline due to numerous factors such as changing tastes in humor and entertainment, the waning relevance of newspapers in general and the loss of most foreign markets outside English-speaking countries. One particularly humorous example of such promotional efforts is the Great Comic Strip Switcheroonie, held in 1997 on April Fool's Day, an event in which dozens of prominent artists took over each other's strips. Garfield's Jim Davis, for example, switched with Blondie's Stan Drake, while Scott Adams (Dilbert) traded strips with Bil Keane (The Family Circus).

While the 1997 Switcheroonie was a one-time publicity stunt, an artist taking over a feature from its originator is an old tradition in newspaper cartooning (as it is in the comic book industry). In fact, the practice has made possible the longevity of the genre's more popular strips. Examples include Little Orphan Annie (drawn and plotted by Harold Gray from 1924 to 1944 and thereafter by a succession of artists including Leonard Starr and Andrew Pepoy), and Terry and the Pirates, started by Milton Caniff in 1934 and picked up by George Wunder.

A business-driven variation has sometimes led to the same feature continuing under a different name. In one case, in the early 1940s, Don Flowers' Modest Maidens was so admired by William Randolph Hearst that he lured Flowers away from the Associated Press and to King Features Syndicate by doubling the cartoonist's salary, and renamed the feature Glamor Girls to avoid legal action by the AP. The latter continued to publish Modest Maidens, drawn by Jay Allen in Flowers' style.

== Issues in U.S. newspaper comic strips ==
As newspapers have declined, the changes have affected comic strips. Jeff Reece, lifestyle editor of The Florida Times-Union, wrote, "Comics are sort of the 'third rail' of the newspaper."

=== Size ===
In the early decades of the 20th century, all Sunday comics received a full page, and daily strips were generally the width of the page. The competition between papers for having more cartoons than the rest from the mid-1920s, the growth of large-scale newspaper advertising during most of the thirties, paper rationing during World War II, the decline on news readership (as television newscasts began to be more common) and inflation (which has caused higher printing costs) beginning during the fifties and sixties led to Sunday strips being published on smaller and more diverse formats. As newspapers have reduced the page count of Sunday comic sections since the late 1990s (by the 2010s, most sections have only four pages, with the back page not always being destined for comics) has also led to further downsizes.

Daily strips have suffered as well. Before the mid-1910s, there was not a "standard" size", with strips running the entire width of a page or having more than one tier. By the 1920s, strips often covered six of the eight columns occupied by a traditional broadsheet paper. During the 1940s, strips were reduced to four columns wide (with a "transition" width of five columns). As newspapers became narrower beginning in the 1970s, strips have gotten even smaller, often being just three columns wide, a similar width to the one most daily panels occupied before the 1940s.

In an issue related to size limitations, Sunday comics are often bound to rigid formats that allow their panels to be rearranged in several different ways while remaining readable. Such formats usually include throwaway panels at the beginning, which some newspapers will omit for space. As a result, cartoonists have less incentive to put great efforts into these panels. Garfield and Mutts were known during the mid-to-late 80s and 1990s respectively for their throwaways on their Sunday strips, however both strips now run "generic" title panels.

Some cartoonists have complained about this, with Walt Kelly, creator of Pogo, openly voicing his discontent about being forced to draw his Sunday strips in such rigid formats from the beginning. Kelly's heirs opted to end the strip in 1975 as a form of protest against the practice. Since then, Calvin and Hobbes creator Bill Watterson has written extensively on the issue, arguing that size reduction and dropped panels reduce both the potential and freedom of a cartoonist. After a lengthy battle with his syndicate, Watterson won the privilege of making half page-sized Sunday strips where he could arrange the panels any way he liked. Many newspaper publishers and a few cartoonists objected to this, and some papers continued to print Calvin and Hobbes at small sizes. Opus won that same privilege years after Calvin and Hobbes ended, while Wiley Miller circumvented further downsizes by making his Non Sequitur Sunday strip available only in a vertical arrangement. Most strips created since 1990, however, are drawn in the unbroken "third-page" format. Few newspapers still run half-page strips, as with Prince Valiant and Hägar the Horrible in the front page of the Reading Eagle Sunday comics section until the mid-2010s.

=== Format ===
With the success of The Gumps during the 1920s, it became commonplace for strips (comedy- and adventure-laden alike) to have lengthy stories spanning weeks or months. The "Monarch of Medioka" story in Floyd Gottfredson's Mickey Mouse comic strip ran from September 8, 1937, to May 2, 1938. Between the 1960s and the late 1980s, as television news relegated newspaper reading to an occasional basis rather than daily, syndicators were abandoning long stories and urging cartoonists to switch to simple daily gags, or week-long "storylines" (with six consecutive (mostly unrelated) strips following a same subject), with longer storylines being used mainly on adventure-based and dramatic strips. Strips begun during the mid-1980s or after (such as Get Fuzzy, Over the Hedge, Monty, and others) are known for their heavy use of storylines, lasting between one and three weeks in most cases.

The writing style of comic strips changed as well after World War II. With an increase in the number of college-educated readers, there was a shift away from slapstick comedy and towards more cerebral humor. Slapstick and visual gags became more confined to Sunday strips, because as Garfield creator Jim Davis put it, "Children are more likely to read Sunday strips than dailies."

=== Second author ===
Many older strips are no longer drawn by the original cartoonist, who has either died or retired. Such strips are known as "zombie strips". A cartoonist, paid by the syndicate or sometimes a relative of the original cartoonist, continues writing the strip, a tradition that became commonplace in the early half of the 20th century. Hägar the Horrible and Frank and Ernest are both drawn by the sons of the creators. Some strips which are still in affiliation with the original creator are produced by small teams or entire companies, such as Jim Davis' Garfield, however there is some debate if these strips fall in this category.

This act is commonly criticized by modern cartoonists including Watterson and Pearls Before Swine's Stephan Pastis. The issue was addressed in six consecutive Pearls strips in 2005. Charles Schulz, of Peanuts fame, requested that his strip not be continued by another cartoonist after his death. He also rejected the idea of hiring an inker or letterer, comparing it to a golfer hiring a man to make his putts. Schulz's family has honored his wishes and refused numerous proposals by syndicators to continue Peanuts with a new author.

==== Assistants ====
Since the consolidation of newspaper comics by the first quarter of the 20th century, most cartoonists have used a group of assistants (with usually one of them credited). However, quite a few cartoonists (e.g.: George Herriman and Charles Schulz, among others) have done their strips almost completely by themselves; often criticizing the use of assistants for the same reasons most have about their editors hiring anyone else to continue their work after their retirement.

=== Rights to the strips ===
Historically, syndicates owned the creators' work, enabling them to continue publishing the strip after the original creator retired, left the strip, or died. This practice led to the term "legacy strips", or more pejoratively "zombie strips". Most syndicates signed creators to 10- or even 20-year contracts. (There have been exceptions, however, such as Bud Fisher's Mutt and Jeff being an early—if not the earliest—case in which the creator retained ownership of his work.) Both these practices began to change with the 1970 debut of Universal Press Syndicate, as the company gave cartoonists a 50-percent ownership share of their work. Creators Syndicate, founded in 1987, granted artists full rights to the strips, something that Universal Press did in 1990, followed by King Features in 1995. By 1999 both Tribune Media Services and United Feature had begun granting ownership rights to creators (limited to new and/or hugely popular strips).

=== Censorship ===
Starting in the late 1940s, the national syndicates which distributed newspaper comic strips subjected them to very strict censorship. Li'l Abner was censored in September 1947 and was pulled from the Pittsburgh Press by Scripps-Howard. The controversy, as reported in Time, centered on Capp's portrayal of the U.S. Senate. Said Edward Leech of Scripps, "We don't think it is good editing or sound citizenship to picture the Senate as an assemblage of freaks and crooks... boobs and undesirables."

As comics are easier for children to access compared to other types of media, they have a significantly more rigid censorship code than other media. Stephan Pastis has lamented that the "unwritten" censorship code is still "stuck somewhere in the 1950s". Generally, comics are not allowed to include such words as "damn", "sucks", "screwed", and "hell", although there have been exceptions such as the September 22, 2010 Mother Goose and Grimm in which an elderly man says, "This nursing home food sucks," and a pair of Pearls Before Swine comics from January 11, 2011, with a character named Ned using the word "crappy". Naked backsides and shooting guns cannot be shown, according to Dilbert cartoonist Scott Adams. Such comic strip taboos were detailed in Dave Breger's book But That's Unprintable (Bantam, 1955).

Many issues such as sex, narcotics, and terrorism cannot or can very rarely be openly discussed in strips, although there are exceptions, usually for satire, as in Bloom County. This led some cartoonists to resort to double entendre or dialogue children do not understand, as in Greg Evans' Luann. Another example of wordplay to get around censorship is a July 27, 2016 Pearls Before Swine strip that features Pig talking to his sister, and says the phrase "I SIS!" repeatedly after correcting his sister's grammar. The strip then cuts to a scene of a NSA wiretap agent, following a scene of Pig being arrested by the FBI saying "Never correct your sister's grammar", implying that the CIA mistook the phrase "I SIS" with "ISIS". Younger cartoonists have claimed commonplace words, images, and issues should be allowed in the comics, considering that the pressure on "clean" humor has been a chief factor for the declining popularity of comic strips since the 1990s (Aaron McGruder, creator of The Boondocks, decided to end his strip partly because of censorship issues, while the Popeye daily comic strip ended in 1994 after newspapers objected to a storyline they considered to be a satire on abortion). Some of the taboo words and topics are mentioned daily on television and other forms of visual media. Webcomics and comics distributed primarily to college newspapers are much freer in this respect.

== See also ==
- Biblia pauperum
- Billy Ireland Cartoon Library & Museum
- Comic book
- Comic strip syndication
- Comics studies
- History of American comics
- List of British comic strips
- List of cartoonists
- List of newspaper comic strips
- Military humor comic strips
