= Rusty Riley =

American comic strip by Frank Godwin and Rod Reed

- Rusty Riley (March 29, 1959)
- Author(s): Frank Godwin, Rod Reed
- Current status/schedule: Daily and Sunday; concluded
- Launch date: January 26, 1948
- End date: November 1, 1959
- Syndicate(s): King Features Syndicate
- Genre: Adventure

Rusty Riley is an American adventure comic strip which ran from 1948 to 1959. It was created and drawn by Frank Godwin for King Features.

== Characters and story ==
With art by Godwin and scripts by Rod Reed, the first Rusty Riley daily appeared on January 26, 1948. The storyline follows the adventures of a redheaded orphan youth, Rusty Riley, who flees the orphanage with his faithful fox terrier, Flip. In the Bluegrass region of Kentucky, he is hired as a stable boy by wealthy racehorse owner Mr. Miles, owner of Milestone Farm. Encountering crooks and corruption as he grows up in the world of horse racing and horse breeders, Rusty's goal is to establish himself as a jockey. Rusty's girlfriend is Patty Miles, the daughter of his boss.

Godwin made research trips to Lexington, Kentucky, when he began drawing the strip, but complaints about the appearance of horses and farms led to a return visit, as described by comics historian Dave Karlen:

Instead of ignoring these complaints, as some cartoonists might have done, Godwin made another trip to Lexington to visit his critics. For more than a week, he toured the central Kentucky horse farms, took pictures and made numerous sketches of the horses, fences, gates, barns, farm homes, horse cemeteries, country lanes, trees, and other references necessary to make his strip correct. He talked with the thoroughbred horsemen, standard-bred horsemen, saddle horsemen, racetrack officials and newspapermen to get all the information he needed. He also took many pictures in and around the Keeneland and Lexington Trotting Tracks, which were a couple of the sites he later used frequently in his comic strip. Godwin was now ready to make his strip better than ever.

== Sunday strip ==
Frank Godwin's Rusty Riley (December 1, 1959)

The Sunday strip began five months later, on June 27, with Godwin illustrating scripts written either by Reed's brother Harold, or Godwin's brother Harold.

The strip was running in approximately 150 newspapers when Godwin died in 1959 at his home in New Hope, Pennsylvania.

Bob Lubbers was an uncredited ghost artist on the strip at some unspecified point.

== Reprints ==
Dell Comics reprinted Rusty Riley stories in the comic-book series Four Color, in issues #418 (cover-dated Aug. 1952), #451 (Feb. 1953), #486 (Aug. 1953), and #554 (April 1954).

In 2013, Classic Comics Press started a hardcover reprint series, with a reprint of dailies from 1948-49.

== Foreign editions ==
In Chile, it was published in weekly installments, composed of dailies arranged as comic book pages, translated as Pepe Rubio in the magazine El peneca, between 1957-58.
