= Willard Manus =

American writer (1930–2023)

Willard M. Manus (September 28, 1930 – January 19, 2023) was an American novelist, playwright, and journalist based in Greece and Los Angeles. His best known book is Mott the Hoople (1966), the novel from which the British 1970s Mott the Hoople derived their name.

== Biography ==
Willard M. Manus was born in New York on September 28, 1930. He was the author of This Way to Paradise: Dancing on the Tables, a memoir of life in Lindos, Rhodes, Greece, from the 1960s to the 1990s. Additionally he had a dozen other books published, including a young adult novel, A Dog Called Leka, which deals with a young lad sailing the Aegean islands in the company of an exceptional dog. More than two dozen of his plays have been produced in Los Angeles, regionally and in Europe. Manus became a member of Los Angeles Film Critics Association in 1981. He died in Los Angeles County on January 19, 2023, at the age of 92.

== Journalism ==
- Columns

Southern California Correspondent for Playbill On-Line (1995-2000).
Monthly columnist (theatre, opera, books, movies, jazz & blues) What's Up Magazine &, Lively-Arts.com., Total Theater, The Outlook, Daily News, North-East Newspapers, Pasadena Star News, and many others

== Books ==
- Novels

Love Under Aegean Skies
Mott the Hoople, McGraw-Hill Co & Pinnacle Books

- Fiction

The Fighting Men, Panjandrum Books
The Fixers, Ace Books
Connubial Bliss, Panjandrum Books
The Pigskin Rabbi, Breakaway Books

- Children's

The Island Kids, Anglo-Hellenic Publishing Co (Picture Book)

- Young adult

The Proud Rebel, Ridge Press/Teenage Book Club
Sea Treasure, Doubleday
Mystery of the Flooded Mine, Doubleday
A Dog Called Leka, Viveca Smith Publishing Co

- Non-fiction

This Way to Paradise--Dancing on the Tables, Lycabettus Press

== Plays (premiered) ==
Actual Productions: Bon Appetit (Los Angeles, 1984, director Bert Rosario)

Diamonds (Los Angeles, 1985, director Richmond Shepard)
Hemingway--On the Edge (Los Angeles, 1993, director Lonny Chapman)
In My Father's House (Los Angeles, 2000, director Jerome Guardino)
Junk Food (Los Angeles, 1981, director Rick Edelstein)
MM at 58 (Los Angeles, 1989, director Gary Guidinger)
The Bleachers
The Deepest Hunger (Los Angeles, 1984, director Lonny Chapman)
The Electronic Lincoln (Los Angeles, 1992, director Susan Deitz)
Their Finest Hour--Churchill and Murrow (Woodstock, director Nicola Sheara)
The Kendo Master (Los Angeles, 1981, director Sab Shimono)
The Last Laugh (Los Angeles, 1999, director John Lant)
The Love Boutique (Los Angeles, 1989, director Walter Olkiewicz)
The Penis Monologues (Los Angeles, 2002, director Louis Fantasia)
The Yard
Man in the Sun
Porkchops
The Call (Los Angeles, 2006, director Gregory Crafts)
Reap the Whirlwind (Los Angeles, 2000, director Doug Lowry)
Walt-Sweet Bird of Freedom (Los Angeles, 1984, director Lonny Chapman)
Central Avenue--The Musical (Los Angeles, 2007, director Louis Fantasia).
"In My Father's House"
"Berlin Cowboys"
"Bird Lives"
"Prez, the Lester Young Story"
Frank & Ava"
Joe & Marilyn, a Love Story"

"The Life and Loves of Marlene Dietrich:

The Wicked, Wicked, Mae West"

and other plays.....

== Television ==
Boys Will Be Boys, Fox TV.
Secrets of Midland Heights, CBS-TV.
Shannon, CBS-TV.
Too Close For Comfort, ABC-TV.

== Translations ==
Leka de hond (A dog called Leka), translated by Gerrit Brand, Uitgeverij Nobleman, 2012.
