= Pete the Tramp =

Comic strip

- C. D. Russell's Pete the Tramp (March 29, 1959)
- Author: Clarence D. Russell
- Current status/schedule: Finished
- Launch date: January 10, 1932
- End date: December 22, 1963
- Syndicate(s): King Features Syndicate

Pete the Tramp is an American comic strip by Clarence D. Russell (1895–1963) which was distributed by King Features Syndicate for more than three decades, from January 10, 1932 to December 22, 1963. Howard Eugene Wilson, in the Harvard Educational Review, described the strip's title character as "a hobo with a gentleman's instincts."

Russell studied at the Chicago Art Institute and then began working as a freelance artist. During World War I, he went overseas with the American Expeditionary Forces. When he returned to America in 1920, he worked for several New York newspapers, while also contributing to Judge.

== Characters and story ==
Russell's work for Judge included cartoons of a homeless man who was given the name Pete the Tramp when he was syndicated to newspapers beginning January 10, 1932.

Comic strip historian Don Markstein offered this description of Pete the Tramp:

Pete was like most fictional tramps of the time in that he moved around a lot, was always looking for a handout, did an occasional odd job when he couldn't avoid it, and was generally disreputable. But he didn't resemble the worst of them, i.e., wasn't violent or a sneak thief—except the latter, but not very often and never for anything of great value. Pete was often seen in the company of a small yellow dog of indeterminate breed, whom he addressed as Boy. Under the name Pete's Pup, the dog was the star of the Sunday page's topper during the first couple of years. Pete's strip was popular during the Depression and still maintained reasonable circulation after that period's end made his situation less excusable.

During its long run, Pete the Tramp had several topper strips, as detailed by comic strip historian Allan Holtz in 2006:

C.D. Russell's wonderful Pete The Tramp went through a trio of topper strips on its Sunday pages. The first, Pete's Pup, was a dog strip, sort of a canine counterpart to the Mutt and Jeff topper, Cicero's Cat. The next was The Topper Twins, my favorite because the name is an in-joke to the industry term "topper". For some reason, Russell alternatively called this strip The Tucker Twins. The last topper was Snorky... It started in 1935 and is believed to have run as late as 1939. Getting an end date on these later toppers can be a Herculean task, because fewer and fewer papers printed the toppers as the decade of the 1930s wore on. In fact, I have no examples of Snorky later than 1937 in my collection; the 1939 date is based on the strip's listing in the Editor & Publisher yearbooks.

The Further Adventures of Pete the Tramp (1944) was a live-action stag film which stole Russell's character and put him in an erotic situation. During World War II, Russell and Otto Soglow drew their characters at kids' bond rallies in Albany, New York and elsewhere. To cheer up soldiers, Russell also did Pete the Tramp drawings in hospitals during World War II.

Pete the Tramp's topper strip, Snorky (January 24, 1937)

Pete the Tramp ended December 12, 1963, following Russell's death on October 22 of that year.

== Books ==
The Adventures of Pete the Tramp was published in 1935 by Saalfield. Pete the Tramp was published by John Martin's House in 1945.
