= Clarence D. Russell =

American cartoonist (1896–1963)

- Born: August 19, 1896; Buffalo, New York
- Died: October 23, 1963 (aged 67)
- Occupation: Cartoonist
- Known for: Pete the Tramp

Clarence D. Russell's Pete the Tramp (March 5, 1950) as it was published in Barcelona.

Clarence D. Russell (August 19, 1896–October 23, 1963) was an American cartoonist best known for his syndicated comic strip Pete the Tramp.

Born in Buffalo, New York, Russell studied at the Chicago Art Institute and began working as a freelance artist. Just prior to World War I, he arrived in New York City, where he held the position of sports editor for Leatherneck Magazine.

With the outbreak of World War I, he went overseas with the American Expeditionary Force. When he returned to America in 1920, he began working for two newspapers, the New York Evening Post and the New York Evening Mail.

While contributing artwork to the weekly Judge, Russell often sat in Bryant Park on 42nd Street and watched tramps as they fed pigeons and approached people to ask for a nickel for a cup of coffee. Soon Russell's work for Judge included cartoons of homeless men, as he recalled, "I started drawing tramps for Judge, the old humorous magazine, and pretty soon Pete began to evolve. He was my escape valve. Pete did the things I always wanted to do. It would make a nice story if I told you I used to be a tramp myself, but I wasn't. Even if some people say I was."

== Comic strips ==
After Russell signed a contract with King Features Syndicate in 1930, Pete the Tramp was launched on January 10, 1932. Russell continued working for King Features for the next three decades, and during that time he created several other strips, The Tucker Twins, Snorky and Pete's Pup, which ran as topper strips alongside Pete the Tramp. He usually sat at his drawing table working eight weeks ahead of the publication dates.

During World War II, Russell and Otto Soglow drew their characters at kids' bond rallies in Albany, New York and elsewhere. Under the auspices of the American Theatre Wing, Russell and Soglow also did their chalk talks in veteran's hospitals during World War II and in the post-war years.

Pete the Tramp ended December 12, 1963, following Russell's death on October 22 of that year.
