= Room and Board (comic strip) =

Two American comic strips

- Gene Ahern's Room and Board (December 22, 1943)
- Author: Gene Ahern
- Current status/schedule: Concluded
- Syndicate(s): King Features Syndicate
- Genre: humor
- Preceded by: Our Boarding House

Gene Ahern's Room and Board (October 10, 1943)

Room and Board is the title of two American comic strips. The first, created by Sals Bostwick, debuted on May 21, 1928. He drew it until his death in 1930, after which it was continued by cartoonists Brandon Walsh, Benbee, Darrell McClure, Dow Walling and Herman Thomas before coming to an end in 1932.

In 1936, cartoonist Gene Ahern created the second strip, a continuation of a previous strip, Our Boarding House, which he drew from 1921 to 1936 for another syndicate. This second Room and Board was discontinued on November 29, 1958. Ahern's Room and Board had no connection with Bostwick's strip other than the like title.

== Revival history ==
Ahern was making an annual $35,000 doing Our Boarding House for Newspaper Enterprise Association when King Features Syndicate offered to double that figure. Leaving NEA in March 1936 for King Features, Ahern created a copycat strip, using the title of the previous King Features strip, Bostwick's Room and Board.

The new Room and Board had more than a few parallels with Our Boarding House, including a larger-than-life blowhard as the central character.

== Characters and story ==
A resident in the second Room and Board's boarding house was Judge Puffle, very similar to Major Hoople, the central character of Ahern's Our Boarding House. The mustache was slightly different, the nose was slightly smaller, and instead of a fez like that worn by Hoople, Puffle had a beret.

Some strips featured a large roomer that the landlord had rented a room to and asked various persons to evict.

Comics historian Don Markstein traced the proliferation of Puffle and other Hoople variations:

Knock-offs, such as Associated Press' Mister Gilfeather (which, by the way, was handled at various times by both Al Capp and Milton Caniff, before they hit it big with Li'l Abner and Terry and the Pirates, respectively), began to proliferate. In fact, it was a knock-off that took Ahern away from his creation. King Features launched one called Room and Board, starring the very Hoople-like Judge Puffle, in 1936, and hired Ahern himself to write and draw it. This was a reprise of a move King had made nine years earlier, hiring George Swanson (Elza Poppin) to produce a duplicate of his own NEA strip, Salesman Sam, and it had a similar result — success, but not to the extent of the original. When, in 1953, Ahern retired, Room and Board ended. Today, its memory is overshadowed by its own topper, The Squirrel Cage, where the enigmatically familiar phrase, "Nov shmoz ka pop?" was introduced.

The strip also adopted Our Boarding House's format of a single panel daily with a multi-panel Sunday page.

Gene Ahern's Room and Board (June 19, 1938)

== The Squirrel Cage ==
Ahern's topper strip, The Squirrel Cage, which ran above Room and Board from June 21, 1936, until at least 1947, is notable because of the repetitive use of the nonsensical question, '"Nov shmoz ka pop?", which was never translated yet became a national catch phrase. As a consequence, The Squirrel Cage and Our Boarding House are today both better remembered than Room and Board, despite its 17-year run.

== Reprints ==
There were several reprints in Dell Comics anthologies before the strip came to an end with Ahern's 1953 retirement.
