= Out Our Way =

American comic strip by J.R. Williams

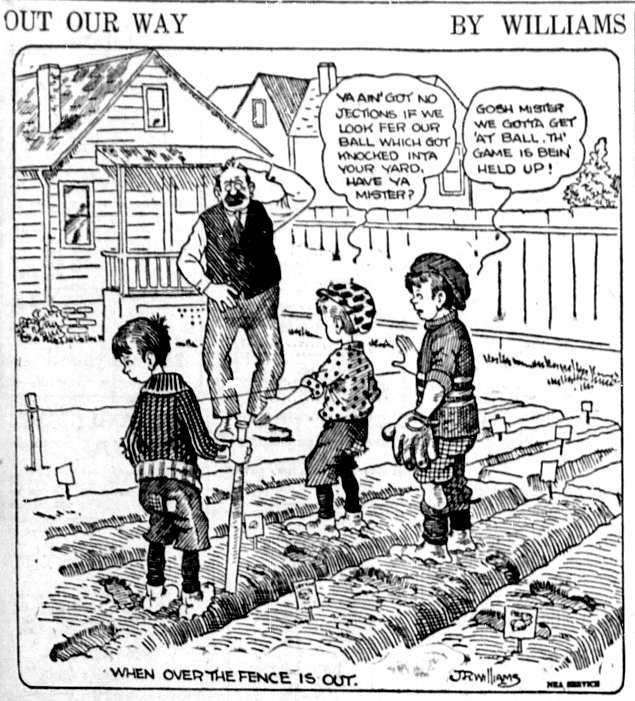
- 1923 sample of the comic
- Author: J. R. Williams (1922–1957)
- Current status/schedule: ended
- Launch date: March 20, 1922
- End date: 1977
- Alternate name(s): Born Thirty Years Too Soon, Heroes Are Made, Not Born, Bull of the Woods, Why Mothers Get Gray, The Worry Wart
- Syndicate(s): Newspaper Enterprise Association
- Genre: Humor

Out Our Way was an American single-panel comic strip series by Canadian-American comic strip artist J. R. Williams. Distributed by Newspaper Enterprise Association, the cartoon series was noted for its depiction of American rural life and the various activities and regular routines of families in small towns. The panel introduced a cast of continuing characters, including the cowboy Curly and ranch bookkeeper Wes. Out Our Way ran from 1922 to 1977, at its peak appearing in more than 700 newspapers.

== Publication history ==
Out Our Way first appeared in a half-dozen small-market newspapers on March 20, 1922.

Williams used Out Our Way as an umbrella title for several alternating series, including The Bull of the Woods, Why Mothers Get Gray, Born Thirty Years Too Soon, The Worry Wart, and Heroes Are Made - Not Born.

The success of the daily panel prompted a Sunday feature, but it was not a grouping of panels, as in the Sunday Grin and Bear It. Instead, the characters of Why Mothers Get Gray were expanded into a Sunday strip, Out Our Way with the Willits (aka The Willets). Williams' assistants on the Sunday strip were Neg Cochran and George Scarbo (whose own strip The Comic Zoo sometimes ran next to The Willets as a Sunday sidebar feature).

In 1957, Williams died at age 69. Out Our Way was continued by Neg Cochran, Walt Wetterberg, Paul Gringle, and Ed Sullivan. The daily panel ended on October 11, 1975 with Cochran's retirement. The Sunday strip, by Sullivan, ran until 1977.

== Characters and story ==
The content of Out Our Way was based on Williams' own life experiences, as noted by Michael H. Price in the Fort Worth Business Press:

Cartooning can become a higher art, if motivated by urges greater than rattling off an easy gag or beating the next deadline. Thus do any perceived barriers between Charlie Russell and J.R. Williams prove irrelevant. Williams' mass-consumption newspaper cartoons come from a font of artistry and inspiration as deep and personal as anything that drove Russell. Jim Williams' Out Our Way is the great masterpiece of cowboy cartooning, surviving in obscurity for an eventual rediscovery. The feature draws upon the writer-artist's personal background as a muleskinner (and industrial machinist, and prizefighter, and family man) in ways that make the individual episodes — each self-contained panel suggesting a larger story — as resonant today as when new ..."It was just this little knack I'd developed for drawing things," Williams told The Saturday Evening Post in 1953. "Nobody outside the bunkhouse or the machine shop had ever seemed to want my style of small-town humor, but I was too stubborn to give up." By the 1950s, Out Our Way had attracted a readership in the millions. Williams' range of experiences, coupled with a gentle sarcasm and a keen observational sense, made his work unique. He tapped into the commonplace happenings of everyday life — childhood in a small town, the earthy humor that lightens the rigors of ranch life and the factory floor — and became an entertaining chronicler of a day before the 20th Century had come of age.

== Rotating themes ==
J. R. Williams' Out Our Way (November 6, 1940)

Williams used Out Our Way as an umbrella title for several alternating series, which carried the subtitle hand-lettered within the panel border. These included The Bull of the Woods, with gags focusing on the foreman of a machine shop, and a depiction of small town family life in Why Mothers Get Gray. Don Markstein, in describing Williams' settings and themes, lists the other subtitles:

Frequently-used settings reflected Williams's experiences before he became a cartoonist, and included factory floors, mechanic shops, and cattle ranches — in fact, cowboys and other ranch denizens appeared so frequently, it could almost have edged Little Joe out as comics' first successful Western, if other settings hadn't been prominent as well. Family life and the adventures of small town boys were also common themes. Williams often used multiple large word balloons when the situation called for it, but if the picture stood on its own, didn't mind getting the words out of the way and using only a single short caption. He often re-used the same captions, such as Born Thirty Years Too Soon, Heroes Are Made, Not Born, Bull of the Woods and Why Mothers Get Gray. The Worry Wart was frequently used as a caption for panels starring a boy of about eight. Wart was one of several recurring characters, but the daily didn't have a regular star.

== Toppers ==
Starting February 27, 1927, a topper, or subsidiary strip, appeared over the Sunday page: Wash Tubbs, a gag comic strip by Roy Crane. The regular Wash Tubbs feature began as a gag-a-day strip in 1924 but quickly evolved into an action-adventure strip; the topper over Out Our Way was a return to the original concept. The topper shifted focus to become A Wash Tubbs Game from September 4, 1932 to January 29, 1933. After this, the comic strip returned for a few weeks, and then became Wash Tubbs Comical Jigsaw Puzzle from March 19 to May 7, 1933. The topper was then renamed Goofy-Ginks, and ran until September 24, 1933.

== Reprints ==
Williams' strips and cartoons were collected in several books. The Worry Wart had his own comic book in 1956. Leonard G. Lee's Algrove Publishing reprinted Williams' work in more than a dozen volumes of its Classic Reprint Series. In addition to Out Our Way Sampler: 20s, 30s & 40s (2005), their catalog includes U.S. Cavalry Cartoons, The Bull of the Woods (six volumes) and Classic Cowboy Cartoons (four volumes).

== See also ==
- Our Boarding House
