= Daily comic strip =

Type of a comic strip

A daily strip is a newspaper comic strip format, appearing on weekdays, Monday through Saturday, as contrasted with a Sunday strip, which typically only appears on Sundays. They typically are smaller, 3–4 grids compared to the full page Sunday strip and are black and white.

Bud Fisher's Mutt and Jeff is commonly regarded as the first daily comic strip, launched November 15, 1907 (under its initial title, A. Mutt) on the sports pages of the San Francisco Chronicle. The featured character had previously appeared in sports cartoons by Fisher but was unnamed. Fisher had approached his editor, John P. Young, about doing a regular strip as early as 1905 but was turned down. According to Fisher, Young told him, "It would take up too much room, and readers are used to reading down the page, and not horizontally." Other cartoonists followed the trend set by Fisher, as noted by comic strip historian R. C. Harvey:

The strip's regular appearance and its continued popularity inspired imitation, thus establishing the daily "strip" form for a certain kind of newspaper cartoon. Until Mutt and Jeff set the fashion, newspaper cartoons usually reached readers in one of two forms: on Sunday, in coloured pages of tiered panels in sequence (some like Winsor McCay's Little Nemo in Slumberland, intended chiefly for children to read): on weekdays, collections of comic drawings grouped almost haphazardly within the ruled border of a large single-frame panel (directed mostly to adult readers)... Then on that November in 1907, Fisher made history by spreading his comic drawings in sequence across the width of the sports page. And when his editor consented to this departure from the usual practice, the daily comic strip format was on its way to becoming a fixture in daily newspapers."

In the early 1900s, William Randolph Hearst's weekday morning and afternoon papers around the country featured scattered black-and-white comic strips, and on January 31, 1912, Hearst introduced the nation's first full daily comics page in his Evening Journal.

== Formats and color ==
The two conventional formats for daily newspaper comics are strips and single gag panels. The strips are usually displayed horizontally, wider than they are tall. Strips are usually, but not always, broken up into several smaller panels with continuity from panel to panel. Single panels are square, circular or taller than they are wide. One of the leading single gag panels for decades, Grin and Bear It, was created in 1932 by George Lichty and initially syndicated by United Feature Syndicate.

Throughout the 20th century, daily newspaper strips were usually presented in black and white and Sunday strips in colour, but a few newspapers have published daily strips in colour, and some newspapers, such as Grit, have published Sunday strips in black and white. On the web, daily newspaper strips are usually in colour, and conversely, some Webcomics, such as Joyce and Walky, has been created in black and white.

Traditionally, balloons and captions were hand-lettered with all upper case letters. However, there are exceptions such as a few strips which have typeset dialogue such as Barnaby. Upper and lower case lettering are used in Gasoline Alley.

== Gag-a-day ==
A distinction is made between continuity strips which have continuous storylines and gag-a-days in which the same characters appear in different humorous situations with no ongoing plot. In some cases, a gag-a-day strip might depict different characters each day. Writer-artist Jim Scancarelli attempts an overlap by inserting daily gags into his Gasoline Alley continuity storylines.

== Layout ==
Newspapers can display strips on separate pages randomly or thematically, such as placing a sports strip on the sports page. Initially, a newspaper page included only a single daily strip, usually either at the top or the bottom of the page. By the 1920s, many newspapers gathered the strips together on a single page, along with news articles, columns, puzzles and/or other illustrated features. In many newspapers, the width of the strips made possible an arrangement of the strips into two stacks displayed from the top to the bottom of the page.

Some newspapers would alter a horizontal strip to fit their page layout by placing the first two panels of a strip atop panels three and four. This then had a shape roughly similar to a gag panel and could be grouped with the gag panels.

The title of a strip was sometimes typeset and pasted into the first panel, enabling the strips to be closely stacked. This had the advantage of making space for additional strips but often resulted in a crowded, unattractive page design. More often during the 1930s and 1940s, the title was typeset (in all upper case letters) and positioned to the right in the white space area above that strip, with the byline on the right. An episode subtitle (in upper and lower case) was centred between the title and the byline. In later years, the subtitles vanished as continuity strips gave way to humour strips. In a nod toward the classic daily strips of yesteryear, the cartoonist Bill Griffith continues the tradition by always centring a hand-lettered episode subtitle above each of his Zippy strips. In rare cases, some newspapers assembled pages of stacked strips minus titles, leaving more than a few confused readers.

== Shrinkage ==
Early daily strips were large, often running the entire width of the newspaper, and were sometimes three or more inches in height. In the 1920s, an eight-column newspaper usually ran a daily strip over six columns. Over decades, the size of daily strips became smaller and smaller, until by the year 2000, four standard daily strips could fit in an area once occupied by a single daily strip. Larger sizes have returned with today's digital distribution by DailyINK and other services.

During the 1930s, the original art for a daily strip could be drawn as large as 25 inches wide by six inches high. As strips have become smaller, the number of panels has been reduced. In some cases today, the daily strip and Sunday strip dimensions are almost the same. For instance, a daily strip in The Arizona Republic measures 4 3/4" wide by 1 1/2" deep, while the three-tiered Hägar the Horrible Sunday strip in the same paper is 5" wide by 3 3/8" deep.

== Archival clippings ==
The popularity and accessibility of strips meant they were often clipped and saved or posted on bulletin boards or refrigerators. Authors John Updike and Ray Bradbury have written about their childhood collections of clipped strips. Many readers related to J. R. Williams' homespun humour and clipped his long-run daily panel, Out Our Way. As noted by Coulton Waugh in his 1947 book, The Comics, anecdotal evidence indicated that more of Williams' daily cartoons were clipped and saved than any other newspaper comic strip.

Strips had an ancillary form of distribution when they were clipped and mailed, as noted by The Baltimore Sun's Linda White: "I followed the adventures of Winnie Winkle, Moon Mullins and Dondi, and waited each fall to see how Lucy would manage to trick Charlie Brown into trying to kick that football. (After I left for college, my father would clip out that strip each year and send it to me just to make sure I didn't miss it.)"

Collections of such clipped daily strips can now be found in various archives, including Steve Cottle's online I Love Comix Archive. Comics historian Bill Blackbeard had tens of thousands of daily strips clipped and organized chronologically. Blackbeard's San Francisco Academy of Comic Art Collection, consisting of 2.5 million clippings, tearsheets and comic sections, spanning the years 1894 to 1996, has provided source material for books and articles by Blackbeard and other researchers. During the 1990s, this collection was acquired by the Billy Ireland Cartoon Library & Museum, providing the Ohio State museum with the world's most extensive collection of daily newspaper comic strip tear sheets and clippings. In 1998, six 18-wheelers transported the Blackbeard collection from California to Ohio.

== Commentary ==
A Fortune poll in 1937 ranked the ten leading strips in popularity (with number one as the most popular):

1. Little Orphan Annie
2. Popeye
3. Dick Tracy
4. Bringing Up Father
5. The Gumps
6. Blondie
7. Moon Mullins
8. Joe Palooka
9. Li'l Abner
10. Tillie the Toiler

The Comics Curmudgeon is a blog which provides an ongoing humorous and critical commentary of daily comic strips.

== See also ==
- Allan Holtz
- Graphic novel
- Fred Waring Cartoon Collection
- List of British comic strips
- List of comic strip syndicates
- List of newspaper comic strips A-F
- Michigan State University Comic Art Collection
- Sunday comics
- Slylock Fox & Comics for Kids
