= Gene Ahern =

American cartoonist (1895–1960)

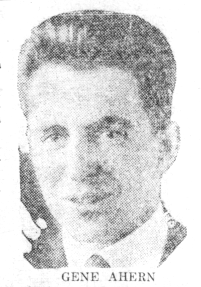
- 1921 newspaper photo of Ahern
- Born: Eugene Leslie Ahern; 16 September 1895 Chicago, Illinois
- Died: March 6, 1960 (aged 64) Los Angeles, California
- Area: Cartoonist
- Notable works: Our Boarding House
- Spouse: Jane

Eugene Leslie Ahern (September 16, 1895 – March 6, 1960) was a cartoonist best known for his bombastic Major Hoople, a pompous character who appeared in the long-run syndicated gag panel Our Boarding House. Many of Ahern's comic strips took a surreal or screwball approach, notably The Squirrel Cage with its nonsensical catchphrase "Nov shmoz ka pop?"

== Early life ==
Ahern was born and raised in Chicago, attending public schools and working as a butcher boy, as noted in a 1929 newspaper article:

Gene Ahern's path to the height of popularity in the comic world, started, strange as it may seem—in a meat market. True, he had been to art school before this, but it was his job as butcher's helper that gave real opportunity the first chance to knock. Gene spent his time making sketches on the long rolls of brown paper in which the shop's meat was wrapped. One day a man connected with a large fashion house came into the market for pork chops. Gene snipped them off and wrapped them up, using, by chance, a sheet of the paper he had previously covered with sketches. The customer eyed the package. “Who drew these?” he asked. “Oh, I did—just for the fun of it,” said Gene. Whereupon the customer suggested that it would be more fun to draw such pictures for money—and Ahern readily agreed that it would. The conversation continued and Gene told of his studies at art school and of his fondness for sketching. The stranger expressed interest and wound up by offering Gene a job in his fashion house art department. In his new job, he admits he hardly set the world on fire, but he learned a lot about drawing and that was what counted.

In his teens, he worked as a model, which he later recalled, "Daily, I slipped on cutaway coats, silk top hats and immaculate white gloves—and stood indolently in the front of a room while an artist sketched me for a catalogue."

== Comic strip career ==
Gene Ahern's Room and Board (May 2, 1952)

In 1914, after three years study at the Chicago Art Institute, Ahern went to Cleveland and worked for the Newspaper Enterprise Association (NEA) syndicate as a sportswriter and artist, initially inking comic drawings for $18 a week. He worked on such strips as Dream Dope, Fathead Fritz, Sporty Sid and his Pals, Taking Her to the Ball Game, Ain't Nature Wonderful, Squirrel Food, Balmy Benny and Otto Auto, about a man who loved driving so much that he couldn't stop. Comic strip historian Allan Holtz described the transitions of these Ahern creations:

In 1919, in his strip Squirrel Food, which was a pretty close copy of the look and humor of Rube Goldberg's strip, he introduced a new character, Otto Auto . . . Originally Otto was a sprite who inhabited the background of the strip. Otto's schtick was that he drove his car like a bat out of hell and wouldn't let anything or anyone slow him down. Despite being relegated to the background, Otto quickly became the most popular feature of the strip. On July 20 Squirrel Food was renamed Otto Auto and the mad driver became the star of the show. Ahern made a daily game out of Otto's driving exploits, inviting readers to submit ideas for how to stop Otto's car. Every day Otto would encounter readers' traps and ambushes, and every day Otto would successfully avert them. This period of the strip was, for my money, one of the funniest slapstick sequences ever committed to newsprint... Ahern knew that trying to make Otto Auto a series endlessly plying this single joke was a mistake. So it came that Otto's car was finally stopped and the strip moved to a garage where Otto and his second banana Clem traded jibes as fumbling mechanics... [On] February 6, 1921, . . . the strip was replaced by Crazy Quilt.

=== The Nut Brothers ===
In 1921 he introduced the Nut Brothers, Ches and Wal, in Crazy Quilt. That same year, NEA General Manager Frank Rostock suggested to Ahern that he use a boarding house for a setting. Our Boarding House began September 16, 1921, scoring a huge success with readers after the January 1922 arrival of the fustian Major Hoople. The Nut Bros: Ches and Wal ran as a topper strip above Our Boarding House.

=== From Hoople to Puffle ===
Ahern was making an annual $35,000 at NEA, and King Features Syndicate offered to double that figure. Leaving NEA in March 1936 for King Features, Ahern created Room and Board (1936–1953). A resident in that boarding house was Judge Puffle, very much in the Hoople tradition.

Don Markstein traced the proliferation of Puffle and other Hoople variations:

Knock-offs, such as Associated Press's Mister Gilfeather (which, by the way, was handled at various times by both Al Capp and Milton Caniff, before they hit it big with Li'l Abner and Terry and the Pirates, respectively), began to proliferate. In fact, it was a knock-off that took Ahern away from his creation. King Features launched one called Room and Board, starring the very Hoople-like Judge Puffle, in 1936, and hired Ahern himself to write and draw it. This was a reprise of a move King had made nine years earlier, hiring George Swanson (Elza Poppin) to produce a duplicate of his own NEA strip, Salesman Sam, and it had a similar result—success, but not to the extent of the original. When, in 1953, Ahern retired, Room and Board ended. Today, its memory is overshadowed by its own topper, The Squirrel Cage, where the enigmatically familiar phrase, "Nov shmoz ka pop?" was introduced.

=== Radio ===
Our Boarding House was adapted into the radio series Major Hoople (1942–43). No copies of this radio series are known to exist.

== Personal life ==
Living in California for 36 years, Ahern resided at 1280 Stone Canyon in Los Angeles during the 1940s. He was a member of the Los Angeles Art Association, the Bel-Air Country Club, the Los Angeles Philharmonic Association and the National Cartoonists Society.

When he died of a heart attack in 1960, he was survived by his wife, Jane; a daughter, Mrs. Nancy Hayward of Clemmons, North Carolina; a sister, Mrs. Donald McCurdy; and three brothers, Walter, Harold and John, all of Chicago.

== Influence ==
Ahern's The Squirrel Cage (1936–53) featured a bearded character known as The Little Hitchhiker, who became notorious for his frequent expression, "Nov shmoz ka pop?", which he uttered while thumbing for a ride. Some sources say that the phrase is Russian for "Going my way?", others say that the phrase is complete nonsense. The character was the acknowledged inspiration for Robert Crumb's Mr. Natural. The Squirrel Cage was collected into a book by publisher Ken Pierce. It was popular enough that it was used as nose art on at least two US bomber aircraft during the Second World War, a B-17G with 487th Bomb Group and a B-24 that served with the 466th, 93rd, and 446th Bomber Groups.
