= J. R. Williams =

Canadian cartoonist

- J. R. Williams and his horse Lizard
- Born: 30 March 1888 Nova Scotia, Canada
- Died: 17 June 1957 (aged 69) Pasadena, California
- Area: Cartoonist
- Notable works: Out Our Way

James Robert Williams (March 30, 1888 – June 17, 1957) was a Canadian cartoonist who signed his work J. R. Williams. He was best known for his long-run daily syndicated panel Out Our Way. As noted by Coulton Waugh in his 1947 book The Comics, anecdotal evidence indicated that more Williams' cartoons were clipped and saved than were other newspaper comics. A newspaper promotion of 1930 compared him to poets Eugene Field and James Whitcomb Riley.

== Early life ==
Williams was born in Nova Scotia, Canada. When he was young, his family moved to Detroit, and he was 15 when he dropped out of school to work as an apprentice machinist in Ohio, soon relocating to Arkansas and Oklahoma, where he drifted about, sometimes working on ranches during a six-year period. He spent three years in the U.S. Cavalry.

Returning to Ohio, he married Lida Keith and settled into a steady job with a crane manufacturing firm, where he drew covers for the company's catalog. During his spare time, he created cartoons depicting ranch life and machine shop workers. He started submitting his work to newspaper syndicates, eventually receiving an offer from Newspaper Enterprise Association.

== Out Our Way begins ==
Out Our Way first appeared in newspapers on March 20, 1922. The single-panel series introduced a variety of characters, including the cowboy Curly and ranch bookkeeper Wes, and soon led to a Sunday strip, Out Our Way with the Willets. His assistants on the strip were George Scarbo and Neg Cochran.

Williams used Out Our Way as an umbrella title for several alternating series. These had recurring characters, such as Bull of the Woods about the boss of a machine shop and the small town family life in Why Mothers Get Gray. Don Markstein, in describing Williams' settings and themes, lists the other series subtitles:

Frequently-used settings reflected Williams's experiences before he became a cartoonist, and included factory floors, mechanic shops, and cattle ranches — in fact, cowboys and other ranch denizens appeared so frequently, it could almost have edged Little Joe out as comics' first successful western, if other settings hadn't been prominent as well. Family life and the adventures of small town boys were also common themes. Williams often used multiple large word balloons when the situation called for it, but if the picture stood on its own, didn't mind getting the words out of the way and using only a single short caption. He often re-used the same captions, such as Born Thirty Years Too Soon, Heroes Are Made, Not Born, Bull of the Woods and Why Mothers Get Gray. The Worry Wart was frequently used as a caption for panels starring a boy of about eight. Wart was one of several recurring characters, but the daily didn't have a regular star.

With 40 million readers by 1930, Williams was so successful that he bought his own ranch in Prescott, Arizona, where he rode about on his horse Lizard. He later moved to Pasadena, California. His cartoons and strips continued through the next two decades, appearing in more than 700 newspapers at their peak. They were collected in several books, and some were reprinted in Popular Comics. In 1956, the Worry Wart starred in a single issue of his own comic book, a Dell Four-Color titled Out Our Way with the Worry Wart. The following year, Williams died at age 69.

Out Our Way was continued by Neg Cochran, Paul Gringle, Ed Sullivan and others until 1977.

Publisher Leonard G. Lee of Canada's Algrove Publishing has reprinted Williams' work in more than a dozen volumes of their Classic Reprint Series. In addition to Out Our Way Sampler: 20s, 30s & 40s (2005), their catalog includes U.S. Cavalry Cartoons, The Bull of the Woods (six volumes) and Classic Cowboy Cartoons (four volumes).
