= Joe Musial =

American cartoonist

Joseph Musial (January 15, 1905 – June 6, 1977) was an American cartoonist who drew The Katzenjammer Kids from 1956 to his death in 1977.

== Family ==
Musial was born and raised in Yonkers, New York. His parents were Polish immigrants.

== Career ==
Having studied at the Sorbonne University of Paris in 1929, Musial started out his cartooning career as assistant to Billy DeBeck, creator of Barney Google, in the early 1930s. He subsequently worked as ghost artist on a number of comic strips from King Features, apparently stepping in to assist various creators whenever necessary. He eventually became art director of the comic book division by the syndicate.

In 1956, following the death of cartoonist Doc Winner, King Features sought a replacement writer and artist on The Katzenjammer Kids. Musial took the job, and spent his remaining 21 years drawing the popular weekly strip. He was the fourth artist to work on the strip, following Rudolph Dirks, Harold Knerr and Winner.

== Death ==
Musial died at the North Shore Hospital in Manhasset, New York, at the age of 72. Following his death, cartoonist Mike Senich took over The Katzenjammer Kids.
