= Eqq =

eqq, EQQ, Eqq, may refer to:

- Eqq Tower Doha, Qatar; see List of tallest buildings in Doha, Qatar
- Erqi District (region code EQQ), Zhengzhou Prefecture, Henan, China; see List of administrative divisions of Henan
- equations (plural abbrev: eqq)

== See also ==
- EQ2 (disambiguation)
- EQ (disambiguation)
- EEQ
- Egg (disambiguation)
- EPP (disambiguation)
