= Lasswell =

Lasswell or Laswell is a surname. Notable people with the surname include:

- Alva Lasswell (1905–1988), American Marine Corps officer who decoded the message that led to the death of Yamamoto
- Bill Laswell (born 1955), American bassist, producer and record label owner
- Butch Laswell (1958–1996), American stunt performer
- Fred Lasswell (1916–2001), American cartoonist
- Greg Laswell (born 1974), American musician, recording engineer, and producer
- Harold Lasswell (1902–1978), American political scientist and communications theorist
- Mary Lasswell (1905–1994), American author
- Shirley Slesinger Lasswell (1923–2007), American brand marketing pioneer
