= Fred Harman =

American cartoonist (1902–1982)

- Garbed as Red Ryder, Fred Harman appeared at this 1953 event with 13-year-old Samuel Trujillo, Harman's model for Little Beaver.
- Born: Frederick Harman; February 9, 1902; St. Joseph, Missouri, U.S.
- Died: January 2, 1982 (aged 79); Phoenix, Arizona, U.S.
- Notable work: Bronc Peeler; Red Ryder
- Family: Hugh Harman (brother); Walker Harman (brother)

Frederick "Fred" Harman (February 9, 1902 – January 2, 1982) was an American cartoonist, best known for his popular Red Ryder comic strip, which he drew for 25 years, reaching 40 million readers through 750 newspapers. Harman sometimes used the pseudonym Ted Horn.

Born Leslie Fred Harman, he was two months old when his parents moved from St. Joseph, Missouri, to Pagosa Springs, Colorado, where he grew up familiar with horses and the ranching lifestyle. His father had previously homesteaded in Pagosa in 1891. Harman dropped out of school after seven years and never had any formal art training. He was self taught and developed an eye for dramatic perspective and authentic detail.

== Kansas City ==
Harman worked as a pressman's helper at The Kansas City Star, where he came in contact with the newspaper's art staff. When he was 20 years old, he was employed at the Kansas City Film Ad Company, working with Walt Disney as an animator. Harman and Disney partnered to form their own company but went broke within a year. Harman then went back to Colorado. Harman's brother, Hugh Harman, was also an animator at Disney's Kansas City studio.

In the fall of 1924, Harman got a wire from an artist friend, Sam McConnell, about an illustrating job at Artcrafts Engraving Company. He took the first train he could get to St. Joseph, home of the Pony Express. In addition to his work as a catalog illustrator for Artcrafts (for the Olathe Boot Company, among other catalogs), Harmon created promotional art, book illustrations and film costume designs commemorating the Pony Express, and bought canvas and paint to create his own paintings at home in his spare time. Artcrafts then was on the 5th floor of the Jenkins Music Building, and Fred met and married musician Lola Andrews, who worked on the first floor of the same building. The couple had a son on May 27, 1927, the day Lindbergh arrived in Paris. Harman did not have the money to pay the hospital bill for his son's birth, so his boss at Artcrafts, William Henry Guenther Sr., bought one of Harman's paintings (of a cowboy with red hair) for the exact amount needed to cover the bill. The couple later moved to St. Paul, Minnesota, where Fred was a partner in an advertising agency for several years before it failed. He was employed in Iowa for a short time before moving his wife and son to Pagosa Springs, where they built a log cabin. In 1933, he moved to Los Angeles, where he edited, illustrated and published a Western magazine that collapsed after three issues. Although the Stendahl Art Gallery staged a show of his paintings, none sold.

== Red Ryder ==
Harman self-syndicated his Bronc Peeler strip from 1934 to 1938, finding few takers as he visited various West Coast newspaper offices. Harman also syndicated Bosko comic strips drawn by Robert Allen starting from 1934, after his brother Hugh acquired the character from Warner Bros. Pictures. When he visited New York in 1938, he met publisher and licensing guru Stephen Slesinger and found success. Stephen Slesinger was looking for an exceptional artist to draw Red Ryder and Fred Harman was a perfect match. He was a genuine cowboy who had the talent and the knowledge of the authentic details Slesinger sought. Harman worked with Slesinger for a year, with other artists in Slesinger's New York Studios, before Red Ryder was ready to debut. Red Ryder was launched, with a year's full of pre-written storylines, a multi-pronged licensing campaign and a parade of appearances with Harman appearing as a real-life cowboy artist.

In March 1953, Harman embarked on a six-week USO tour, doing chalk talks at camps in England, France, Germany, Italy, Turkey and Africa.

== Cowboy Artists of America ==
Roping, oil painting by Fred Harman

Harman lived in Albuquerque, New Mexico, while also maintaining his Pagosa Springs ranch. After he retired from the strip in 1964, he turned to painting at his Albuquerque studio. The strip was continued by Bob MacLeod, Jim Gary, John Wade Hampton, and Edmond Good, the same talented artists who had helped produce the Red Ryder content in the New York Studios of Stephen Slesinger.

Harman was one of the original 1965 members of the Cowboy Artists of America, along with Joe Beeler, Charlie Dye, John Hampton, and George Phippen; and Harman's paintings were included in the first annual exhibition of the Cowboy Artists of America on September 9, 1966, at the National Cowboy Hall of Fame in Oklahoma City.

Harman died in Phoenix, Arizona on January 2, 1982 at the age of 79.

== Family ==
Fred Harman's son, Fred Harman III, once operated the Fred Harman Art Museum. It was featured on PBS series Painting and Travel with Roger and Sarah Bansemer in season 2, episode 10, Red Ryder, in a tour of the museum. This museum is now closed.

== Awards ==
Among other honors, Harman was one of only 75 white men in history to be adopted into the Navajo Nation. In 1958, he received the Sertoma Award as Colorado's Outstanding Citizen.

The Red Ryder Round-up is an annual July 4 weekend event in Pagosa Springs, home of the Fred Harman Art Museum.
