= Richard Epp =

Richard Epp may refer to:

- Richard Epp (physicist), Canadian physicist
- Richard Epp (actor), Canadian playwright and actor

== See also ==
- Richard Eppes, planter and surgeon
