= Rebecca Gertrude Affachiner =

Active figure in Jewish public service

- רבקה גרטרוד אפצ'ינר
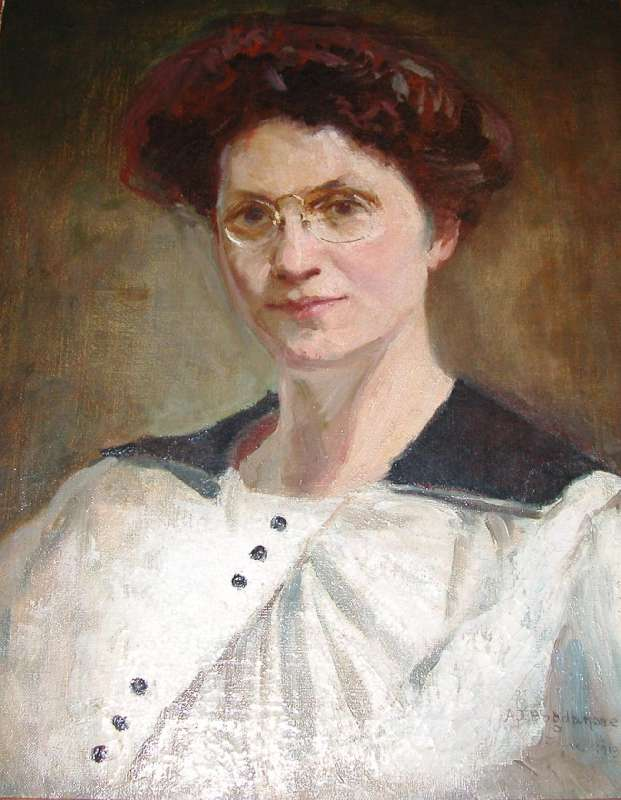
- Born: Rebecca Gertrude Affachiner; 1884; Nyasvizh, Belarus
- Died: 1966 (aged 81–82); Jerusalem, Israel
- Occupations: Jewish Zionist activist and philanthropist
- Known for: She was the first person to fly the Israeli flag over the newly created state of Israel in 1948

Rebecca Gertrude Affachiner (Hebrew: רבקה גרטרוד אפצ'ינר; 1884, Nyasvizh, Belarus – 1966, Jerusalem, Israel) was an active figure in Jewish public service in the United States until 1934 and in Israel from the time of her Aliyah to the mid-1950s.

== Biography ==
Affachiner was born in the family of Isaac and Fanny Affachiner and Fannie Affachiner Port of Nezvizh, Belarus. Isaac Affachiner emigrated to the United States and then sent for his family to join him in New York City in 1890. She attended the School of Philanthropy and Art School in New York. She was the first teacher to graduate from the Jewish Theological Seminary, New York City and took special courses at Columbia and Yale Universities and Hartford College of Law, etc. She began her career in social work in New York City as an investigator for the United Hebrew Charities, later serving as Assistant Superintendent at Beth Israel Hospital, Y.W.H.A. Superintendent Columbia Religious and Industrial School for Jewish Girls.

Affachiner was the first woman to act as chaplain in a State Institution, serving in that capacity at the New York State Training School in Hudson, New York, under the auspices of the New York Section, Council of Jewish Women.

During World War I, Affachiner was Assistant Regional Director of the American Embarkation Center in Le Mans, leaving for France with the first women's unit of the Jewish Welfare Board. Upon her return from service overseas, she conducted a survey for Child Welfare for the United Jewish Aid Society of Brooklyn, N.Y., later making a study of the problem of the Jewish blind, in the same city.

For six years, she served as Superintendent of the United Jewish Charities in Hartford and was actively interested in the Connecticut State School for the Blind. Being a pioneer in work among juvenile delinquents, she was responsible for the earliest developments of the Jewish Big Sisters Movement in New York City, and founded the Jewish Big Sister and Big Brother Organizations in Hartford shortly after coming there in 1920.

In 1926, she made a tour of Palestine, Egypt, Italy, and the Near East; upon her return to America she was appointed the first National Field Secretary of Hadassah, of which she was a charter member. From 1929 to 1934, Affachiner was Director of Jewish Social Service for Greater Norfolk in Norfolk, Virginia. Under the auspices of the Norfolk Section of the National Council of Jewish Women, she also founded and directed Council House, the first Jewish Community Center in that city.

In 1929, she was elected to represent Norfolk at the World Zionist Congress held in Zurich, Switzerland. In 1934 at the age of 50, Affachiner resigned her post in Norfolk and again sailed for Palestine, where she organized the Palestine Society for Crippled Children, which would become Israel's leading pediatric rehabilitation hospital (ALYN Hospital), acting as its Director of Social Service. In 1937, she helped organize the Romanian Settlers’ Association (Hitahdut Olei Rumania) of which she became the Director, and in whose interest she had visited Rumania and the USA 1937–38. In 1939, she was the only woman asked to serve on the Executive Vaad of the Child Placement Bureau Jerusalem – Miklat Dati.

She never returned to live in the U.S. and devoted the rest of her life to the welfare of Jews in every part of the world, especially in the state of Israel she had helped to create. On May 14, 1948, after David Ben Gurion proclaimed Israel a state, Affachiner raised a flag bearing the Magen David, a flag she had sewn herself while her home was under enemy fire. She used what was at hand, cutting up a simple bed sheet, sewing it into a flag with the six-pointed star and stripes, and coloring it with a blue crayon

She died in Jerusalem in 1966 and was buried there in the Sanhedria Cemetery.
