= Epp (surname) =

Epp is a (mostly mennonite) surname. Notable people with the surname include:

- Claas Epp Jr. (1838–1913), Russian Mennonite minister
- Dave Epp (born 1962), Canadian politician
- Elisabeth Epp (1910–2000), German actress
- Ernie Epp (born 1941), Canadian historian and former politician
- Franz Ritter von Epp (1868–1947), German officer
- Herb Epp (1934–2013), Canadian politician
- Jake Epp (1939–2025), Canadian executive and politician
- Josef Epp (1920–1989), Austrian footballer
- Ken Epp (1939–2022), Canadian politician
- Leon Epp (1905–1968) Austrian music director, theatre director and actor
- Phil Epp (born 1946), American artist
- Reuben Epp (1920–2009), Canadian author of works in Mennonite Low German
- Richard Epp (actor) (born 1948), Canadian playwright and actor
- Richard Epp (physicist), Canadian physicist
- Robert Epp (1926–2019), American translator of Japanese literature into English
- Susanna S. Epp (born 1943), American mathematician
- Theodore Epp (1907–1985), American Christian clergyman, writer and radio evangelist

== See also ==
- Epps (disambiguation)
