= John Dirks =

John Dirks may refer to:

- John Dirks (physician)
- John Dirks (cartoonist)
