= Stephen Slesinger =

American producer

William George cover painting for Zane Grey's King of the Royal Mounted 13 (1953). George, who studied with Norman Rockwell, also did covers for Zane Grey novels.

Stephen Slesinger (December 25, 1901 – December 17, 1953) was an American radio, television and film producer, and creator of comic strip characters. From 1923 to 1953, he created, produced, published, developed, licensed or represented several popular literary characters of the 1920s, 1930s and 1940s.

== Biography ==
Stephen Slesinger was born on December 25, 1901, in New York City; He was a third generation New Yorker of Jewish ancestry whose ancestors came from Hungary and Russia. His father, Anthony, was a dress manufacturer. His mother, Augusta (née Singer), was a children's social worker, the Director of the Seward Guidance Bureau, and a published researcher for The NY Dept. of Education, for 40 years. Later she became the executive secretary of Jewish Big Sisters and a noted psychoanalyst. She was also one of the founders of The New School for Social Research. Slesinger studied at the Ethical Culture Fieldston School from September 1914 until June 1919 and later attended Columbia University. His younger sister was the author and screenwriter Tess Slesinger.

== Media ==
In 1927, Slesinger set up shop in New York City as a literary agent, and went on to represent, among others, Newbery Medal-winning writers Hendrik Willem van Loon (who won the first Newbery Medal in 1922), Western authors Zane Grey and Rex Beach, Will James and journalist Andy Rooney. Slesinger acquired the rights to popularize illustrations, texts, characters and personalities in other media.

Always interested in new media, Slesinger took out patents for television presentations of comic strips, and experimented with broadcasting Winnie the Pooh as the first Sunday morning TV cartoon in the mid-1940s. An April 23, 1946 New York Times article, "'Telecomic' Films Shown: Exhibition Held in Connection with Publishers' Meeting", described Slesinger's demonstration of film versions of the Sunday comics, including Dick Tracy, Otto the King and "a synoptic version of a popular children's book". "No attempt to televise the film, which was in color, was made, but Slesinger, president of the group sponsoring the demonstration, said that experiments had been carried on through that medium successfully on the West Coast since 1944."

=== Winnie-the-Pooh ===
In 1930, Slesinger acquired sole and exclusive U.S. and Canadian merchandising, television, recording and other trade rights to Winnie-the-Pooh from A. A. Milne, and developed Winnie-the-Pooh commercializations for more than 30 years, creating the first Pooh doll, record, board game, puzzle, U.S. radio broadcast (NBC), animation, and motion picture film. In the 1950s, after Slesinger's death, his widow, Shirley Slesinger Lasswell, took over the business and launched her own nationwide licensing campaigns. In 1961 and 1983, Stephen Slesinger, Inc. licensed certain of its Pooh rights to the Walt Disney Company.

=== Premiums and products ===
In 1933, Slesinger acquired the merchandising rights to Edgar Rice Burroughs' Tarzan character and produced a series of Big Little Books, games, premiums, toys, treasure maps and other products. Slesinger's marketing and media strategy for Tarzan became the blueprint for success in character merchandising, including the campaigns Superman. Slesinger's The New Adventures of Tarzan "Pop-Up" (Blue Ribbon Press, 1935) book, which he also illustrated, was chosen by Albert Tillman as one of the 100 best pop-up books ever published and featured on the cover of Tillman's historical survey, Pop-Up! Pop-Up! (Whalestooth, 1998).

Slesinger purchased the rights to the Ozark Ike comic strip from creator Rufus A. ("Ray") Gotto. In 1936, it became his first comic strip in syndication. Other personalities and characters curated by Slesinger with innovative media and merchandise campaigns include Tom Mix, Zane Grey's King of the Royal Mounted, Alley Oop, Captain Easy, Wash Tubbs, Polly the Powers Model, Charlie Chan, Buck Rogers and Og, Son of Fire, Blondie and Dagwood (for television), as well as all Newspaper Enterprise Association comic strips. For these and many others, he produced comic books, children's books and created the art and stories for hundreds of Big Little Books distributed by Western Printing and Lithograph, from the 1930s through the 1950s.

== Original characters ==
In the late 1930s, Slesinger began developing original characters, which he then hired artists to bring to life. Most prominent among these are Red Ryder and King of the Royal Mounted, which became Slesinger's most popular characters, syndicated internationally in newspaper comic strips and also generating books, radio shows, motion pictures and numerous ancillary commercial products.

=== Red Ryder and Little Beaver ===
Working with artist Fred Harman, who came from Pagosa Springs, Colorado, Slesinger launched the comic strip Red Ryder. The strip's artistic style evolved from Harman's 1937 comic strip, Bronc Peeler. The two worked on the project for a year before Red Ryder was launched in 1938.

Between 1938 and 1967, the long-running Red Ryder comic strip was also a comic book, the subject of a 12-chapter film serial, 26 motion pictures and numerous merchandising and promotional tie-ins, including the Red Ryder Daisy Carbine Air Rifle, which holds the longest continuing license in the history of the licensing industry and was depicted in the film A Christmas Story (1983).

=== King of the Royal Mounted ===
In 1937 Slesinger licensed Zane Grey's byline and created King of the Royal Mounted, the adventures of a Canadian Mountie who always got his man. King appeared in newspaper strips, comics, Little Big Books and other ancillary items. Grey's son Romer and Slesinger collaborated on many of the stories, and the artwork was produced by Allen Dean and Charles Flanders in Slesinger's New York studio. A movie serial was produced in 1942.

== Television and films ==
In 1940 Slesinger licensed to Republic Pictures the right to produce a 12-chapter Red Ryder serial and 23 Red Ryder motion pictures from 1944 to 1947. These were followed by four Red Ryder motion pictures produced, in CineColor, by Eagle Lion, 1949 to 1950. Slesinger also produced three Red Ryder Television pilots, two of which were completed and one remained uncut at the time of Slesinger's death. In 1963, by arrangement with Red Ryder Enterprises, Inc., Gunsmoke aired an episode entitled "I Call Him Wonder." It was designed as a test for a Red Ryder and Little Beaver Television series. Red Ryder Enterprises, Inc., was created by Slesinger's wife, Shirley, shortly after Slesinger's passing. It currently holds the trademarks and copyrights in the Red Ryder character franchise, as well as original Western and Adventure archives art and story content.

In the mid-1940s through the early 1950s, Stephen Slesinger Productions began producing films and television programs, including adaptations of Winnie-the-Pooh, Red Ryder, King of the Royal Mounted and The West That Lives Forever.

He also formed Telecomics Presents, which displayed scripted comic strip segments as static images instead of animation. There were approximately 130 episodes produced, each lasting about three minutes. Each episode began with the opening of a comic book, the first page showing a silhouette of the lead character (Space Barton, Danny March or Kid Champion); the page then turned to show a full-page illustration. Telecomics is generally noted as one of the first cartoon series produced for television. In 1950, NBC optioned Telecomics' product and repackaged it as NBC Comics.

=== Blondie ===
In 1951, Slesinger acquired rights to make a Blondie television series with Arthur Lake as Dagwood Bumstead and his real-life wife Patricia Lake starring as Blondie at the request of Randolph Hearst, who cared for her as if she was his daughter. Slesinger was completing the pilot episode at the time of his death on December 17, 1953. Amid the shock and confusion of his unexpected passing, the reels of the Slesinger's Blondie pilot mysteriously disappeared.

Among Slesinger's many honors was a 1953 proclamation by the County of Los Angeles which singled him out as a "nationally known humanitarian" whose works "are read by more than 25 million youngsters and adults" and who "has devoted much of his personal time and energy toward helping underprivileged children throughout the nation" and whose "interest in underprivileged children stems from the magnificent work done by his mother, Augusta Slesinger, who served as a psychoanalyst and social worker... for 40 years". The proclamation ends with Slesinger being "complimented for continuing to help in the program of making better citizens out of the youth of the land." The 75th Anniversary of Slesinger's outdoor youth programs was celebrated in 2015.
