= EPP =

EPP or Epp may refer to:

== Organisations ==
- European People's Party, a pan-European centre-right conservative and Christian democratic political party
  - European People's Party Group, the centre-right political group formed in European parliament by members of the above party
- Engineering and Public Policy, an academic department at Carnegie Mellon University
- Equal Parenting Party, a Canadian political party
- European Public Prosecutor, a proposed EU agency
- Paraguayan People's Army (Spanish: Ejército del Pueblo Paraguayo)

== Science and technology ==
- Encrypting PIN pad, a component of an automated teller machine
- End-plate potential, a neuroscience term
- Endpoint protection platform, in computer security
- Enhanced Parallel Port, a specification of the IEEE 1284 computer peripheral communication standard
- Enhanced Performance Profiles, a PC memory specification
- Erythropoietic protoporphyria, a genetic disorder
- Expanded polypropylene, a flexible and versatile plastic foam
- Extended projection principle, a linguistic theory
- Extended Power Profile, a 15 W version of the Qi charging standard
- Extensible Provisioning Protocol, an Internet protocol for domain registration

== People ==
- Epp (given name), a feminine given name (including a list of people with the name)
- Epp (surname), a surname (including a list of people with the name)
- Epp Kaidu, pseudonym of Estonian theatre director and actress Leida Ird (1915–1976)
- Elwood Epp Sell (1897–1961), American Major League Baseball pitcher

== Arts ==
- Epp, a novel by Axel Jensen, published in 1965

== Other uses ==
- Élan Power Products, a subsidiary of Élan Motorsport Technologies
- Enrich Professional Publishing, a publishing house
- Enterprise Platform Programme, an Irish business incubator programme
- Epping railway station, Melbourne
- European Pallet Pool, for eligible pallets conforming to EUR-pallet
- Export parity price, in economics
