= Pierre Grimal =

French historian, classicist and Latinist (1912-1996)

Pierre Grimal (November 21, 1912, in Paris – November 2, 1996, in Paris) was a French historian, classicist and Latinist. Interested in the Greek and Roman civilizations, he did much to promote the cultural inheritance of the classical world, both among specialists and the general public.

== Biography ==
Admitted to the École Normale Supérieure in 1933, and received third at the "agrégation de lettres" in 1935, he was member of the École française de Rome (1935–1937) then taught Latin at a Rennes lycée. Then he was active as a professor of Roman civilization at the faculties of Caen and Bordeaux, and finally at the Sorbonne for thirty years.

He published studies on the Roman civilization, of which many volumes to the "Que sais-je?" series, and translations of Latin classical authors (Cicero, Seneca the Younger, Tacitus, Plautus, Terence). On his retirement, he also published biographies and fictionalized histories (Mémoires d’Agrippine, le procès Néron), more intended for the general public.

At the end of his life, he campaigned for the safeguarding of literary teaching.

== Works ==
All published in Paris:

- Dictionnaire de la mythologie grecque et romaine, published by PUF, 1951, fifth edition in 1976
- Romans grecs et latins, Bibliothèque de la Pléiade, 1958
- Le siècle des Scipions, Rome et l’Hellénisme au temps des guerres puniques, Aubier, second edition in 1975
- La littérature latine, PUF Que sais-je? n° 376, 1965
- La mythologie grecque, PUF Que sais-je? n° 582, ninth edition in 1978
- L’art des jardins, PUF Que sais-je? n° 618, third edition 1974
- Les villes romaines, PUF Que sais-je? n° 657, first edition 1954, seventh edition in 1990
- Le siècle d’Auguste, PUF Que sais-je? n° 676, 1965
- Dans les pas des césars, Hachette, 1955
- Horace, Editions du Seuil, 1955
- La civilisation romaine, Arthaud, fourth edition in 1970
- Italie retrouvée, PUF, 1979
- Nous partons pour Rome, PUF, third edition 1977
- L’amour à Rome, Belles Lettres, 1979
- Mythologies, Larousse, 1964
- Histoire mondiale de la femme, Nouvelle Librairie de France, 1965
- Etude de chronologie cicéronienne, Les Belles Lettres, 1977
- Essai sur l’art poétique d’Horace, Paris SEDES, 1968
- Le guide de l’étudiant latiniste, PUF, 1971
- La guerre civile de Petrone, dans ses rapports avec la Pharsale, Les Belles Lettres, 1977
- Le Lyrisme à Rome, PUF, 1978
- Sénèque, ou la conscience de l’Empire, Les Belles Lettres, 1978
- Le théâtre antique, PUF Que sais-je number 1732, 1978
- Le Quercy de Pierre Grimal, Arthaud, 1978
- Sénèque, PUF Que sais-je number 1950, 1981
- Jérôme Carcopino, un historien au service de l’humanisme (in collaboration with Cl. Carcopino and P. Oubliac), Les Belles Lettres, 1981
- Rome, les siècles et les jours, Arthaud, 1982
- Virgile ou la seconde naissance de Rome, Arthaud, 1985
- Rome, la littérature et l'histoire, École française de Rome, 1986
- Cicéron, Fayard, 1986
- Les erreurs de la liberté, Les Belles Lettres, 1989
- Tacite, Fayard, 1990
- Marc Aurèle
- Les mémoires d’Agrippine, editions De Fallois, 1992
- Le procès de Néron, editions De Fallois

=== Translations ===
==== Latin to French ====
- Frontinus, De aquae ductu Urbis Romae, Belles Lettres, 1944
- Petronius, Satyricon, in Romans grecs et latins, Bibliothèque de la Pléiade, 1958
- Apuleius, Les Métamorphoses, in Romans grecs et latins, Bibliothèque de la Pléiade, 1958
- Longus, La pastorale de Daphnis et Chloé, in Romans grecs et latins, Bibliothèque de la Pléiade, 1958
- Petronius, Satyricon, Livre de poche, 1960
- Seneca the Younger
  - De brevitate vitae, PUF, 1959
  - Phaedra, PUF, 1965
  - De vita beata, PUF, 1969
- Apuleius, Amor and Psyche, PUF, 1963
- Plautus and Terence, complete works, Paris NFR, 1971
- Tacitus, complete works, La Pléiade, 1990
- Cicero (published posthumously)
  - In Pisonem, Belles Lettres, 1967
  - Pro Plancio, Belles Lettres, 1976
- The memoirs of Pomponius Atticus, Belles Lettres, 1976

==== Greek to French ====
- Chariton, Les aventures de Chéréas et de Callirhoé, in Romans grecs et latins, Bibliothèque de la Pléiade, 1958
- Heliodorus of Emesa, Les Ethiopiques, in Romans grecs et latins, Bibliothèque de la Pléiade, 1958
- Achilles Tatius, Le roman de Leucippé et Clitophon, in Romans grecs et latins, Bibliothèque de la Pléiade, 1958
- Philostratos, Vie d'Apollonios de Tyane, in Romans grecs et latins, Bibliothèque de la Pléiade, 1958
- Lucian, Histoire véritable, in Romans grecs et latins, Bibliothèque de la Pléiade, 1958
- Lucian, La Confession de Cyprien, in Romans grecs et latins, Bibliothèque de la Pléiade, 1958

== Honours ==
Pierre Grimal was a member of:

- l' Académie des inscriptions et belles lettres, from 1978
- Comité d'honneur de l'ASSELAF (Association pour la sauvegarde et l'expansion de la langue française)
