= Henry Balink =

Dutch painter

Henry Cornelius Balink
- Born: Hendrikus Cornelius Balink; June 10, 1882; Amsterdam, Netherlands
- Died: April 3, 1963 (aged 80); Santa Fe, U.S.
- Education: Carel Dake, Antoon Derkinderen, and Nicolaas van der Waay at the Royal Netherlands Academy of Arts and Sciences

Henry Balink (June 10, 1882 – April 3, 1963) was a Dutch-born American painter, draughtsman and etcher from Amsterdam, Holland. Born in Amsterdam, he was trained at the Royal Netherlands Academy of Arts and Sciences and immigrated to the United States.

== Early life ==
Balink financed his art education at the age of eleven by ice skating, competing in bike races, and working as a stuntman for a film company. He studied under Carel Dake, Antoon Derkinderen, and Nicolaas van der Waay from 1909 to 1914.

== Biography ==
Balink first came to the United States in 1914 by immigrating to New York, It was during this period he changed his name to Henry Balink.

After briefly staying in New York, Balink traveled to Chicago where he painted murals at Our Lady of Sorrows Basilica and painted portraits.

Balink traveled to Taos, New Mexico, after seeing a poster in 1917. In 1923, he moved to Santa Fe where he built an adobe studio to live and work in.

In 1927, E.W. Marland commissioned Balink to paint portraits of Oklahoma’s Indian chiefs in Ponca City. Balink taught mural painting and applied wood sculpture at the Santa Fe Indian School in the 1930s.

Balink taught George Phippen and Dwight D. Eisenhower painting skills.

Balink’s works are in the collections of the Kansas City Art Institute and the Gilcrease Museum in Tulsa, Oklahoma.
