= Columbia Religious and Industrial School for Jewish Girls =

- New York City

Information
- Religious affiliation: Jewish
- Established: 1888
- Closed: Circa 1944
- Gender: Female

Columbia Religious and Industrial School for Jewish Girls was a Jewish school for girls located in the East Side of Manhattan in New York City. It was established in 1888 in response to the many Christian missionaries who worked on the Lower East Side of New York. The school intended to promote Jewish culture, prevent students from becoming converts to Christianity, offer Jewish education to students, prevent students from delinquency, and "raise up respectable and religious Jewish women." The school became defunct around 1944.

== Mission ==
In 1907, Mathilde Schecter, who served on the school's Board of Directors, wrote that the school's goals were to "keep sacred and alive every little flame of Jewish home life, the holiness, the reverence for authority and religion, and harmonize the old and the new elements in [the children's] lives."

== History ==
Adolph Benjamin and Adolphus Solomons established the school in 1888. It was initially located at 120 Columbia Street but relocated several times to East 3rd Street, East 5th Street, and Eldridge Street.

In 1907, the school's principal was Rebecca Affachiner. She grew up on the East Side of New York, having immigrated from Poland, and was described by the Atlanta Jewish Times as the "Betsy Ross of Israel." Rosalie Solomons Phillips, who was eminent in the Jewish-American community and a founding member and co-chair of Hadassah, served as president of the Columbia School.

In the mid-1930s and 1940s, the Columbia School struggled through "serious" financial challenges. This was due to the Great Depression and due to the view that American Jews should "keep quiet and take care of themselves without asking for outside help." A rough draft of a letter found in the school's files dated 1943 stated that the school would be forced to close on May 31, 1944 unless it acquired funds. However, in 1944, Rose Kaye, the school's president, wrote in a note, "Thank God the school will live." The school's last files were dated July 1944.

== Curriculum ==
The school consisted of a religious branch and an industrial branch. The number of students who attended industrial classes was about twice as many as the number of students who attended religious classes.

In the industrial branch, students were taught to sew by hand and machine, mend, embroider, cut, and make garments. Approximately 200–300 students studied per afternoon; there were two different sessions so that the large number of students could be accommodated. An assignment the students were assigned was to sew their graduation gowns. The goal of the Industrial branch's classes was to provide activities to fill students' time so that they would not have time to be proselytized by missionaries and so that they would learn the skills required to "run a Jewish home." Additionally, the industrial school intended to form a network of Jewish women which would serve the purpose of binding them to the Jewish community.

Students from the Jewish Theological Seminary operated the religious department of the school. About 120 students attended religious classes; they attended services on Saturday afternoons and Sunday school classes which taught Jewish doctrine, Bible history, and Hebrew.

Students of the Columbia School also took singing lessons and attended field trips in July which exposed them to nature.

== Student body and alumnae ==
The school served about 1,000 students per week in 1907. Most students were described as being "from the poorest elements of [the Lower East Side]" and of Galician and Hungarian descent. Many of the students came from the families of "poor Jewish immigrants."

After graduation, students of the Columbia School joined the Alumnae Club. The club consisted of approximately 500 women who had graduated from or taught at the school. Many students who had graduated from the school later taught there. It met regularly for "religious and educational uplift." Members also attended social events such as a Purim dance, entertainment evenings, and anniversary celebrations.
