= Petrone =

Petrone is a surname, and may refer to:

- Epp Petrone (born 1974), Estonian writer, journalist, blogger, and publisher
- Francisco Petrone (1902–1967), Argentine actor
- Pedro Petrone (1905–1964), Uruguayan footballer
- Penny Petrone (1925–2005), Canadian writer, educator, patron of the arts, and philanthropist
- Rocco Petrone (1926–2006), American engineer
- Sonia Petrone, Italian mathematical statistician
