= Mathilde Roth Schechter =

American Conservative Jew (1859–1924)

Mathilde Roth Schechter (also Matilda; December 16, 1859 – August 27, 1924) was the American founder of the U.S. National Women's League of Conservative Judaism in 1918.

== Biography ==
Schechter was born in 1857 in Breslau, Prussia (now Wrocław, Poland). She studied at a teacher's seminary and then travelled to England where she was enrolled at Queens College. While she was there she met and married Dr. Solomon Schechter, who was studying at Jews College at the time.They lived in Cambridge, England, where she opened her house as a meeting place for young Jewish intellectuals. She edited the works of local academics, including her her husband's work, and translated work from German into English, among them that of the poet Heinrich Heine.

In 1902 the family moved to New York, when her husband, a prominent scholar and rabbi, assumed the Chancellorship of the Jewish Theological Seminary of America (JTSA).

== Activism ==
She viewed herself as a helpmate for her husband, and worked to address the needs of the Seminary students, including social and cultural events as well as financial assistance. She also helped the wives of the new faculty adjust to their new surroundings. She also lobbied JTS to create housing for the students, resulting in The Student House which opened on W.117th Street in 1918. It was also used by soldiers on leave in New York. In her memory the Mathilde Schechter Residence Hall, undergraduate housing for students , built on W.122 St was named in her memory.

In addition she founded and taught at the Columbia Religious and Industrial School for Jewish Girls, on the Lower East Side.

She worked very closely with Henrietta Szold in creating Hadassah, and later served as its national chairwoman of education.

In parallel with the founding of the United Synagogue, Schechter created the Women's League of Conservative Judaism to involve women in Jewish and synagogue activities. Among their work was preparing Kiddush cards, distributing pamphlets on Jewish life written by seminary scholars, such as Shavuot, Passover, etc, social and social action activities. A bi-product of developing the Women's League was the creation of female leadership. By the time she retired as Chairman in 1919, there were 57 sisterhood branches throughout the country and 6,000 members.

She died at Mount Sinai Hospital in Manhattan on August 27, 1924, following an operation.
