= Epp (given name) =

Female given name

- Gender: Female
- Language: Estonian
- Name day: 13 October

Origin
- Region of origin: Estonia

Epp is predominantly an Estonian feminine given name. As of 1 January 2021, 671 women in Estonia have the first name Epp, making it the 248th most popular female name in the country. The name is most commonly found in Põlva County. Individuals bearing the name Epp include:

- Epp Annus (born 1969), Estonian writer and literary scholar
- Epp Eespäev (born 1961), Estonian actress
- Epp Haabsaar (born 1953), Estonian judge, politician and artist
- Epp Kaidu (1915–1976), Estonian theatre director and actress
- Epp Mäe (born 1992), Estonian freestyle, judo and sumo wrestler
- Epp Mikkal (et:Epp Mikkal) (born 1942), Estonian playwright and theatre pedagogue
- Epp Petrone (born 1974), Estonian journalist, blogger, children's writer and publisher
- Epp Tamm (et:Epp Tamm) (1940–2020), Estonian classical linguist and translator
