= Bronc Peeler =

American comic strip by Fred Harman

- Fred Harman's Bronc Peeler as seen in newspapers on November 4, 1934.
- Author: Fred Harman
- Current status/schedule: Ended
- Launch date: 1933
- End date: July 2, 1938
- Syndicate: self-syndicated
- Genre: Western

Bronc Peeler was a Western adventure cowboy comic strip created by Fred Harman in 1933, and ran until July 2, 1938. Harman is best known as the artist for the Red Ryder comic strip, which he created with Stephen Slesinger.

Harman was on a Colorado ranch when he decided to do a comic strip. He headed for Hollywood in the early 1930s, borrowed some money and began Bronc Peeler, which he syndicated himself. The Bronc Peeler Sunday strip began October 7, 1934. "Peeler" is traditional cowboy slang for a specialist in breaking horses—training them to tolerate riders. "Bronc" or "bronco" is a wild or untrained horse.

== Characters and story ==
The comics are set in the present time (the 1930s when this series was first published). Redheaded Bronc Peeler is a tough cowboy who fights bandits and rustlers with the help of his pal, Coyote Pete. Bronc Peeler introduced the Navaho youth, Little Beaver, who continued as an important supporting character in Red Ryder. Comics historian Don Markstein described the characters:

Bronc was a redheaded young man who was good in a fight, with either fists or a six-gun, and equally good on a horse. He put his skills to use against Injuns, cattle rustlers, rapacious city slickers, bandits and other villain types of the Western adventure pulps. He had a rugged Westerner's drawl, and a rugged Westerner's attraction to the ladies, to whom he was unfailingly polite. His first sidekick was an old desert rat named Coyote Pete, but Harman decided (at his wife's suggestion) to reach out to young readers by dropping Pete in favor of a kid. Bronc adopted a Navajo boy named Little Beaver following the death of the tyke's father, Chief Beaver. Little Beaver was destined to outlast Bronc.

A large, unrelated Western action scene appeared in the middle of Harman's Sunday page, with the final tier of story panels positioned beneath the large center panel. Harman also drew Western lore into an extra panel, On the Range. The strip came to an end in 1938 when Harman dropped it to do Red Ryder.

== Reprints ==
In 1937, Whitman published a Big Little Book, Bronc Peeler, the Lone Cowboy, and the strip was reprinted in Popular Comics until the early 1940s.

In 2012, publisher Russ Cochran reprinted Bronc Peeler pages at a large size in the first issue of The Sunday Funnies, a publication devoted to reprints of vintage Sunday comic strips.
