= Cowboy Artists of America =

Organization of artists

The Cowboy Artists of America (CAA) is an exclusive organization of artists that was founded in 1965. It was founded in 1965 by four prominent western artists, Joe Beeler, Charlie Dye, John Hampton and George Phippen, who have all since died. Since its inception, the exclusive organization of artists has always been dedicated to portraying the lifestyles of the cowboy and the American West, both as it was and as it endures. The CAA was founded in 1965 in Sedona, Arizona and held its first art show in 1966 at the Cowboy Hall of Fame in Oklahoma City, Oklahoma. In 1973, the annual event moved to the Phoenix Art Museum. In April 2011, the museum announced that it would no longer host the event.

In 2015, the CAA's 50th anniversary exhibition was to be held at the Scottsdale Museum of the West in Scottsdale, Arizona.

The artists' works, highly sought after by western collectors, often fetch high prices. As an example, Howard Terpning's Cooling Off the Hard Way sold for $305,000 at the 2003 Santa Fe Art Auction.

== Members ==
As of 2015, the CAA had cumulatively had 77 artists as members. Notable members have included:

- Joe Beeler
- James Boren (Note: A former president of the CAA)
- Harley Brown
- Gary Carter
- Charlie Dye
- Phil Epp
- Fred Fellows
- John Hampton
- Fred Harman
- Harvey W. Johnson
- Frank McCarthy
- William Moyers
- Gary Niblett
- Bill Owen
- George Phippen
- Clark Kelley Price
- James Reynolds
- Tom Ryan
- Gordon Snidow
- U. Grant Speed
- Howard Terpning
