= Barney Google and Snuffy Smith =

American comic strip

- Bunky and Barney Google and Snuffy Smith (July 26, 1942)
- Author(s): Billy DeBeck (1919–1942); Fred Lasswell (1942–2001); John R. Rose (2001–present)
- Current status/schedule: Running
- Launch date: June 17, 1919; 107 years ago
- Alternate name(s): Take Barney Google, F'rinstance; Barney Google; Barney Google and Spark Plug
- Syndicate: King Features Syndicate
- Publisher(s): Cupples & Leon, Hyperion Press, Kitchen Sink Press, IDW Publishing, Lulu.com
- Genre: Humor

Barney Google and Snuffy Smith, originally Take Barney Google, for Instance, (Note: By July 11, 1919, the title had changed to Take Barney Google, F'rinstance.) is an American comic strip created by cartoonist Billy DeBeck. Since its debut on June 17, 1919, the strip has gained a large international readership, appearing in 900 newspapers in 21 countries. The initial appeal of the strip led to its adaptation to film, animation, popular song, and television. It added several terms and phrases to the English language and inspired the 1923 hit tune "Barney Google (with the Goo-Goo-Googly Eyes)" with lyrics by Billy Rose, as well as the 1923 record "Come On, Spark Plug!"

Barney Google himself, once the star of the strip and a very popular character in his own right, was at one point almost entirely phased out of the feature. An increasingly peripheral player in his own strip beginning in the late 1930s, Barney was officially "written out" in 1954, although he occasionally returned for cameo appearances, often years apart. During a period between 1997 and 2012, Barney Google was not seen in the strip at all. Barney was reintroduced to the strip in 2012, and has slowly returned to being a semi-regular character.

Snuffy Smith, who was initially introduced as a supporting player in 1934, has now been the comic strip's central character for over 60 years. Nevertheless, the feature is still titled Barney Google and Snuffy Smith.

As of June 17, 2019, Barney Google has run for an entire century, making it the third-longest running and uninterrupted comics series of all time, after Rudolph Dirks' The Katzenjammer Kids and Frank O. King's Gasoline Alley. After Gasoline Alley, it is the second-longest running newspaper comic still in syndication and producing new episodes as of 2021.

== Characters and story ==
=== Barney Google ===
Barney Google and Snuffy Smith

Like Mutt and Jeff, Barney Google started out on the sports page. First appearing as a daily strip in the sports sections of the Chicago Herald and Examiner in 1919, it was originally titled Take Barney Google, for Instance. The title character, a little fellow (although he shrank in stature even more after the first year) with big "banjo" eyes, was an avid sportsman and ne'er-do-well involved in poker, horse racing, and prize fights.

The "goggle-eyed, moustached, gloved and top-hatted, bulbous-nosed, cigar-chomping shrimp" (according to comics historian Bill Blackbeard) was relentlessly henpecked by "a wife three times his size" (as the song lyric goes). The formidable Mrs. Lizzie Google, or "the sweet woman", sued Barney for divorce and thereafter virtually disappeared from the strip. By October 1919, the strip was distributed by King Features Syndicate and was published in newspapers across the country.

His name might have been an inspiration for the large number name googol, which in turn inspired the company name Google.

=== Spark Plug ===
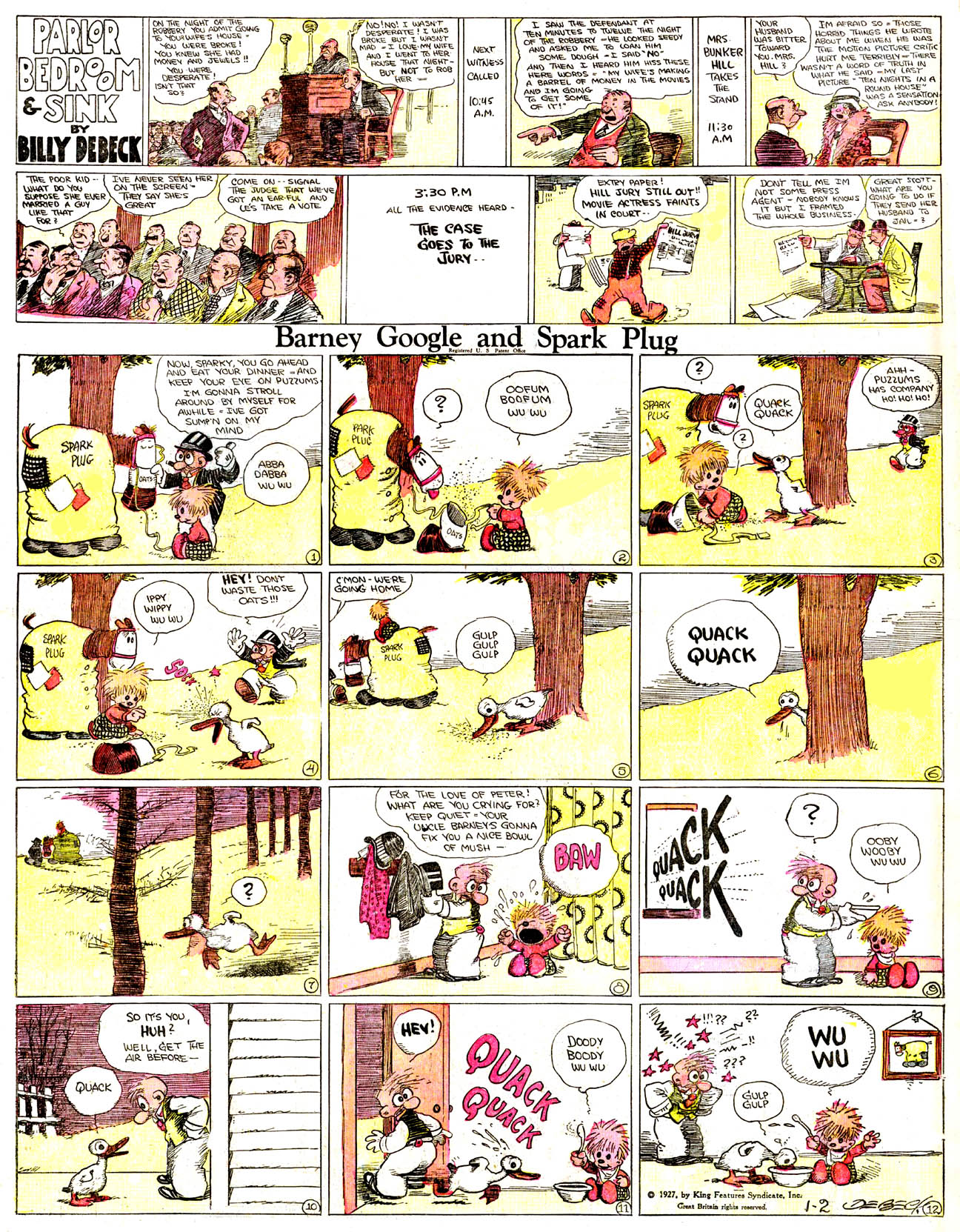
Barney Google and Spark Plug (January 2, 1927), with an accompanying topper strip on a Sunday page.

Beginning on July 17, 1922, the strip took a momentous turn in popularity with the seemingly innocuous introduction of an endearing race horse named "Spark Plug". Barney's beloved "brown-eyed baby" was a bow-legged nag that seldom raced, and was typically seen almost totally covered by his trademark patched blanket with his name scrawled on the side. Peanuts creator Charles M. Schulz was known to his friends as Sparky, a lifelong nickname given to him by his uncle as a diminutive of Barney Google's Spark Plug. Comics historian Don Markstein noted:

Sparky's first race became one of comics' first national media events, eagerly anticipated by millions of newspaper readers. So great was the public's enthusiasm that DeBeck, who had been planning to retire the plug after that one storyline, made him a permanent part of the cast. Spark Plug was such a star during the 1920s that children who enjoyed the comics were liable to get "Sparky" for a nickname—for example, Charles M. "Sparky" Schulz, who grew up to create Peanuts.

In deference to his enormous popularity during this period, the strip was retitled Barney Google and Spark Plug. DeBeck's strip hit its peak of popularity with Spark Plug at about the same time the 1923 song "Barney Google", written by Billy Rose and Con Conrad, was sweeping the country. It became one of the best known, most iconic novelty records of its era, and has been recorded by such artists as The Happiness Boys, Eddie Cantor, The Andrews Sisters, Spike Jones, and Mitch Miller:

Who's the most important man this country ever knew?
Who's the man our presidents tell all their troubles to?
No, it isn't Mr. Bryan and it isn't Mr. Hughes;
I'm mighty proud that I'm allowed a chance to introduce:

Barney Google—with the goo, goo, googly eyes,
Barney Google—bet his horse would win the prize;
When the horses ran that day,
Spark Plug ran the other way!
Barney Google—with the goo-goo-googly eyes!

Who's the greatest lover that this country ever knew?
Who's the man that Valentino takes his hat off to?
No, it isn't Douglas Fairbanks that the ladies rave about;
When he arrives, who makes the wives chase all their husbands out?

Barney Google—with the goo-goo-googly eyes,
Barney Google—had a wife three times his size;
She sued Barney for divorce,
Now he's sleeping with his horse!
Barney Google—with the goo-goo-googly eyes!

Other popular characters and concepts introduced in the strip about this time include "Sunshine", Barney's black jockey, a troublesome ostrich named "Rudy", "Sully", a monocled champion wrestler, and the mysterious hooded fraternity "The Order of the Brotherhood of Billy Goats", a parody of mystic secret societies. (There was also a "Sisterhood of Nanny Goats" for women.) Their password was "O-K-M-N-X" which, deciphered, stood for a standard breakfast order ("Okay, ham and eggs"). Barney was elected "Exalted Angora" in 1928.

Billy DeBeck's Barney Google (February 5, 1931)

=== Transition to Barney Google and Snuffy Smith ===
In 1934, an even greater change took place when Barney and his horse visited the North Carolina mountains and met a volatile, equally diminutive moonshiner named Snuffy Smith. Hillbilly humor was popular at the time (as Al Capp was proving with Li'l Abner). The strip increasingly focused on the southern Appalachian hamlet of "Hootin' Holler", with Snuffy as the main character. The mountaineer locals are suspicious of any outsiders, referred to as "flatlanders" or even worse, "revenooers" (Federal Revenue agents).

Snuffy Smith was so popular that his name was added to the strip's title in the late 1930s, while the top-billed Barney Google became an increasingly peripheral character in what once was his own comic. Eventually, Barney Google left Hootin' Holler in 1954 to return to the city, and was essentially written out of the strip except as a very occasional visitor. Barney has appeared rarely in the feature from the mid-1950s on, but returned to Hootin' Holler for a visit in a series of strips beginning on February 19, 2012. Prior to 2012, Barney had not appeared in the strip since January 5, 1997, a span of over 15 years. Nevertheless, even during Barney's long absence the strip was always officially titled Barney Google & Snuffy Smith.

Barney Google — usually with Spark Plug in tow — made occasional return trips to Hootin' Holler from 2012 to 2020, and moved back permanently to Hootin' Holler in a series of strips run in May 2021. He now appears in the strip as more of a semi-regular character.

Also appearing again on a semi-regular basis is Spark Plug, and — slightly more frequently — new cast addition "Li'l Sparky", billed as Spark Plug's grandson.

=== Snuffy Smith and the townsfolk of Hootin' Holler ===
Snuffy Smith (whose last name is pronounced "Smif" by virtually all the characters in Hootin' Holler) is an ornery little cuss, sawed-off and shiftless. He lives in a shack, mangles the English language, and has a propensity to shoot at those who displease him. He makes "corn-likker" moonshine in a homemade still and is in constant trouble with the sheriff. He wears a broad-brimmed felt hat almost as tall as he is, has a scraggly mustache and a pair of tattered, poorly patched overalls. He constantly cheats at poker and checkers. He also has some proclivity toward stealing chickens, which led to a brief but effective use of his character in a marketing campaign by the Tyson Foods corporation in the early 1980s. In 1937, he held the post of "Royal Doodle Bug" in the "Varmints" lodge; during this period, the strip heavily employed the catchphrase, "What did the Doodle-Bug say?", an apparent homage to "What did the Woggle-Bug say?" in L. Frank Baum and Walt McDougall's Queer Visitors from the Marvelous Land of Oz strip of 1904–1905.

Almost all of the characters in the strip (except the infrequently seen Barney Google and the occasional visiting "flatlander") are exaggerated hillbillies in the classic burlesque tradition: sharp-tongued gossipy women such as Snuffy's wife Loweezy; his baby Tater; his mischievous nephew Jughaid; his neighbors Elviney and Lukey (Lucas Ebenezer Hinks); the sanctimonious (but nonetheless ungrammatical) Parson; Silas, the ever-parsimonious owner of the General Store; the ostentatiously badged Sheriff Tait, and others. Vehicles are rundown jalopies of a seeming 1920s vintage, even in the 1970s and beyond. The characters are drawn so that they appear to be talking out of the sides of their mouths.

== Topper strips ==
=== Bughouse Fables ===
On December 24, 1920, DeBeck began a gag panel called Bughouse Fables, featuring his observations of ordinary people doing foolish things, which he signed "Barney Google". This daily panel ran until November 13, 1937. DeBeck added Bughouse Fables as an accompanying topper strip to run with Barney Google on Sundays, from January 17 to May 9, 1926.

=== Bunky ===
On May 16, 1926, DeBeck began another topper strip, originally called Parlor, Bedroom and Sink—but better known as Bunky. Parlor Bedroom and Sink—which evolved into Parlor Bedroom and Sink Starring Bunky, and eventually simply Bunky—is an over-the-top parody of stage melodramas and movie and radio serials that were popular at the time. The title character "Bunky" (short for Bunker Hill Jr.) was a hapless waif whose penniless parents, Bunker Hill Sr., and Bibsy, had given birth to the strangely erudite newborn with the enormous nose on November 13, 1927. The irresponsible Bunker Sr. eventually disappeared from the strip. From then on, pint-sized Bunky (still dressed in the baby bonnet and gown in which he was first seen) was the star, protector, and benefactor of the family. His vocabulary rivaled that of any educated adult.

Arch-nemesis Fagin, introduced in 1928, was as vile and despicable a villain as any Charles Dickens antagonist. He "would steal pennies from a blind man's cup and kick dogs that weren't even in his way. Robbing widows and orphans ... was routine for him", according to comics historian Don Markstein, who said the strip popularized the phrase, "Youse is a viper!"

Fantasy author and Conan the Barbarian creator Robert E. Howard, a big fan of Bunky, was fond of quoting from the strip, as noted by his friend, Tevis Clyde Smith. After DeBeck's death in 1942, Bunky continued for a time under Joe Musial (The Katzenjammer Kids) and Fred Lasswell. The series ended on July 18, 1948.

=== Other toppers ===
Other toppers featured above Barney Google included: Who's Who (1932), Youse Is a Viper (May 15, 1932 - Aug 19, 1934), I Learnt This Trick from the Prince (Aug 12-Sept 2, 1934), Knee-Hi-Knoodles (Sept 9, 1934 - June 23, 1935), Hill-Billy Ba-Looney (Sept 15-Dec 8, 1935), What Did the Doodle Bug Say? (April 11–25, 1937) and Write a Caption for This Cartoon (Sept 11-Oct 9, 1938).

== Fred Lasswell ==
When Barney Google began to lose popularity during the Great Depression, DeBeck introduced a simpler style through artist Fred Lasswell after seeing a poster by Lasswell, then in high school, at a golf tournament at Palma Ceia Country Club in Tampa, Florida. Lasswell, who drew cartoons and posters at the McCarthy Ad Agency and for the Tampa Daily Times, was brought in to create the Snuffy characters, which by 1934, surpassed Barney Google in popularity.

Lasswell took over the strip, now named Barney Google and Snuffy Smith after DeBeck died in 1942. In 1944 and 1945, Lasswell began featuring Snuffy in guest appearances in Laswell's own Sargent Hashmark comic strip that appeared in the U.S. Marines' Leatherneck Magazine. After the war, Lasswell gained steady increases in distribution, with the strip eventually appearing in more than 1,000 newspapers throughout the world.

In 1962, Lasswell received the Silver Lady Award, and two years later won the Reuben Award and the Best Humor Strip Award from the National Cartoonist's Society. In both 1984 and 1994, he won the Elzie Segar Award, being the only cartoonist who received this award more than once.

Lasswell died in 2001, 16 weeks ahead on the strip, leaving a digital archive containing 35,000 original comic panels and sketches, including over 20,000 daily and 4,000 Sunday strips and about 24,000 original gags.

== John R. Rose ==
In mid-1998, editorial cartoonist John R. Rose began as Lasswell's inking assistant, and he became the strip's cartoonist after Lasswell's death. In addition to being the artist on the strip, Rose was the editorial cartoonist from 1988 to 2020 for Byrd Newspapers of Virginia, later bought by Ogden Newspapers and he creates Kids' Home Newspaper, a weekly syndicated puzzle feature for Creators Syndicate. His books include The Bodacious Best of Snuffy Smith (2013), Balls of Fire! More Snuffy Smith Comics (2016), and Snuffy Smith In His Sunday Best (2018), Barney Google And Snuffy Smith Turn 100! The Bodacious Digital Collection (2024) Published by King Features and Up To Snuff (2026). Rose is credited with restoring Barney Google as a semiregular character beginning in 2012. In 2015, Rose was presented the Lum and Abner Memorial Award by the National Lum and Abner Society for his contributions to rural humor. In September 2017, Rose was honored with an award at Walt Disney's Hometown Toonfest in Marceline, Missouri, for his contributions to cartooning. John Rose was awarded First Place from the Tennessee Press Association in 2018 for Best Use Of Humor In An Ad for a series wildfire prevention public service newspaper ads featuring Snuffy Smith. He created these "Snuff Out Wildfires Before They Start" ads for the Knoxville News-Sentinel and the Tennessee Press Association after devastating wildfires hit eastern Tennessee. In June 2019, Rose featured Barney Google in a special 100th-birthday series that lasted several weeks. Barney got lost in the funny papers trying to find Hootin' Holler and ended up visiting Dagwood, Popeye, Beetle Bailey, and more on his way to a birthday party that featured many characters from Barney Google and Snuffy Smith who had not been seen in decades, as well as tribute panels to cartoonists Billy DeBeck and Fred Lasswell. In August 2021 Rose was awarded the Jack Davis Award for South East Cartoonist Of The Year by the South East Chapter Of The National Cartoonists Society. Rose created a special weeklong storyline in the comic strip which began on July 17, 2022 celebrating Spark Plug's 100th birthday.

== Legacy ==
DeBeck, who had a gift for coining colorful terms, is credited with introducing several Jazz Age slang words and phrases into the English language—including "sweet mama", "horsefeathers", "heebie-jeebies", "hotsy-totsy", and "Who has seen the doodle bug?" Snuffy's catchphrases "great balls o' fire" and "time's a-wastin'" remain popular to this day.

In DeBeck's memory, the National Cartoonists Society in 1946 introduced the Billy DeBeck Award. (Eight years later, the name was changed to the Reuben Award after Rube Goldberg.) In 1963, Lasswell won both the NCS Humor Comic Strip Award and Reuben Award. That same year, he won the society's plaque for Best Humor Strip. In 1984, the society gave him its Elzie Segar Award (named after the creator of Popeye) for outstanding contributions to his profession.

Snuffy Smith currently appears in 21 countries and 11 languages. In 1995, the strip was honored by the U.S. Postal Service; it was one of 20 included in the Comic Strip Classics series of commemorative USPS postage stamps.

In Mordecai Richler's 1997 novel Barney's Version, it is revealed in the last chapter that his mother called him Barney because she liked the Barney Google song.

== Licensing ==
The Barney Google song, as sung by Ernest Hare and Billy Jones.

Snuffy Smith makes a brief appearance in Clifford D. Simak's novel Out of Their Minds.

=== Toys and merchandise ===
Menu for planned Snuffy's Shanty hot dog shops

Spark Plug captured the nation's hearts and imagination during the 1920s, and became a merchandising bonanza for King Features and Billy DeBeck. "Spark Plug, I am happy to say, has caught on," wrote DeBeck in 1924. "All over the United States you find stuffed Spark Plugs and Spark Plug games and Spark Plug drums and Spark Plug balloons and Spark Plug tin pails. And there is a Spark Plug play on the road. The only thing that is lacking is a Spark Plug grand opera." (Source: Barney Google and Snuffy Smith: 75 Years of an American Legend, page 35). During the mid-1950s, the Louis Marx Toy Company sold four vinyl character figures, two-and-a-half-to-three inches tall, representing Snuffy Smith, Loweezie, Jug Haid and Sut Tattersail. (Illustrated at http://www.marxwildwest.com/cartoons%20-%20non-disney.html). In 1960, King Features made plans to have Snuffy Smith serving hot dogs and chili at Snuffy's Shantys [sic] across the country, the plan of a Columbus, Georgia, franchiser who had hoped to have 700 shanties operating by 1970.

In July 2004, Dark Horse Comics issued a limited-edition figure of Barney Google in a colorful collector tin as statue number 47 in their line of Classic Comic Character figures.

In November 2021, Comics Kingdom began selling tee shirts in their online shop featuring Spark Plug's grandson, Li'l Sparky.

In July 2022, Comics Kingdom began selling tee shirts in their online shop celebrating Spark Plug's 100th birthday.

In July 2023, Comics Kingdom began selling Snuffy Smith red, white and blue trucker caps in their online shop.

=== Sheet music ===
- "Barney Google Foxtrot" by Billy Rose and Con Conrad (1923) Jerome H. Remick & Co.
- "Come On, Spark Plug!" by Billy Rose and Con Conrad (1923) Waterson, Berlin & Snyder Co.
- "Bug House Fables" by Clarence Gaskill (1923) M. Witmark & Sons
- "So I Took the $50,000" by Jack Meskill and Al Gumble (1923) Jerome H. Remick & Co.
- "O-K-M-N-X We're Twenty Million Strong" (or "The Brotherhood of Billy Goats") by Phil Baker, J. Russel Robinson and Sid Silvers (1928) Jerome H. Remick & Co.
- "Time's a-Wastin' (The Original Yard Bird Song)" by Olsen and Johnson, Jay Levison and Ray Evans (1941) Broadcast Music, Inc.

=== Comic books ===
Barney Google and Snuffy Smith each had a spotty history in comic books, starting with the first issue of David McKay's Ace Comics (1937). They appeared in their own comics as well—three issues from Dell Comics in the 1940s, four from Toby Press in the 1950s, one from Gold Key Comics in the 1960s, and six from Charlton Comics in the 1970s. In December, 2015, Snuffy Smith returned to comic books. John Rose wrote and illustrated the comic book story "Hopalong Jughaid" for Charlton Spotlight #9.

=== Book collections and reprints ===
(All titles by Billy Debeck unless otherwise noted)

- Barney Google and His Faithful Nag Spark Plug (1923) Cupples & Leon Co.
- Barney Google and Spark Plug #2 (1924) Cupples & Leon Co.
- Barney Google and Spark Plug #3 (1925) Cupples & Leon Co.
- Barney Google and Spark Plug #4 (1926) Cupples & Leon Co.
- Barney Google (1935) Big Little Book #1083 Saalfield
- Barney Google: 1919–1920 (1977) Hyperion Press ISBN 0-88355-631-6
- The Smithsonian Collection of Newspaper Comics (1977) Smithsonian Institution Press/Harry Abrams (Bill Blackbeard, ed.)
- Barney Google and Snuffy Smith: 75 Years of an American Legend (1994) Kitchen Sink Press (Brian Walker, ed.) ISBN 0-87816-283-6
- Barney Google: Gambling, Horse Races and High-Toned Women! (2010) Yoe! Books (imprint of IDW) ISBN 1-60010-670-6
- The Bodacious Best of Snuffy Smith (2013) Lulu.com (John Rose) ISBN 978-1-300-28330-0
- Balls Of Fire! More Snuffy Smith Comics (2016) Lulu.com (John Rose) ISBN 978-1-329-51608-3
- Snuffy Smith In His Sunday Best (2018) Lulu.com (John Rose) ISBN 9781387073948
- Barney Google (2019) IDW Publishing (Library of American Comics), (Foreword by John Rose, Introduction by Brian Walker) ISBN 978-1-68405-578-4. Reprints daily strips originally published May 31, 1926 - December 7, 1926 and October 7, 1927 - April 6, 1928.
- Barney Google And Snuffy Smith Turn 100! The Bodacious Digital Collection (2024) Published by King Features (John Rose) Reprints of all Sunday comic strips and some daily comic strips originally published in 2019.
- Up To Snuff (2026) Lulu.com (John Rose) ISBN 9781105265815

== Film and television ==
=== Live-action – 1920s ===
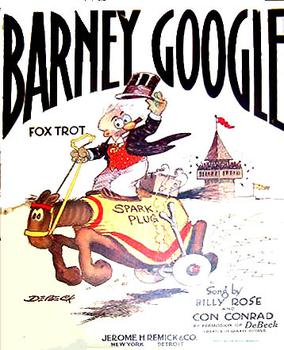
"Barney Google" sheet music (1923). This same image appears on the front cover of Craig Yoe's Barney Google book (2010).

Beginning in 1928, Barney Hellum portrayed Barney Google in a series of silent live-action short films for F.B.O. Pictures, also featuring Philip Davis as Sunshine.

- Horsefeathers (1928)
- OKMNX (1928) (or Barney Google's Welcome Home)
- T-Bone Handicap (1928)
- Money Balks (1928)
- The Beef-Steaks (1928)
- Runnin' Through the Rye (1929)
- Sunshine's Dark Moment (1929)
- Neigh, Neigh, Spark Plug (1929)
- A Horse on Barney (1929)
- Just a Stall (1929)
- The Pace That Thrills (1929)
- Slide, Sparky, Slide (1929)

=== Live-action – 1940s ===
Two low-budget, live-action B-movie features based on the strip were produced at Monogram Pictures in 1942: Private Snuffy Smith (or Snuffy Smith, Yardbird) and Hillbilly Blitzkrieg. Diminutive actor Bud Duncan portrayed Snuffy in both films, with Cliff Nazarro appearing as Barney in Hillbilly Blitzkrieg. (Both films also feature former Keystone Cop Edgar Kennedy and future Mouseketeer Jimmie Dodd in supporting roles.)

=== Animation – 1930s ===
An animated cartoon Barney Google series in the mid-1930s was produced by the Charles Mintz Screen Gems Studio. Mintz made only four Barney Google cartoons, all released theatrically through Columbia Pictures and all directed by Sid Marcus.

- Tetched in the Head (October 24, 1935)
- Patch Mah Britches (December 19, 1935)
- Spark Plug (April 12, 1936)
- Major Google (May 24, 1936)

=== Animation – 1940s ===
Spree for All (1946) is an animated Noveltoon produced by Famous Studios, distributed through Paramount Pictures. It was produced in color, but currently exists only in a black and white print.

=== Animation – 1960s ===
In 1962, King Features Syndicate released 50 six-minute Snuffy Smith cartoons for television, produced by Paramount Cartoon Studios in New York. All 50 episodes are available on the, "Advantage Collection, Cartoon Mega Pack" DVD set.

The opening credits included a catchy theme song that was specifically composed for the cartoon:

Uh-uh-oh! Great balls o' fire, I'm bodacious!
Uh-uh-oh! Great balls o' fire, I'm a fright!
Uh-uh-oh! Great balls o' fire, goodness gracious!
I'm chop-chop-chop-chop-choppin' with all o' my might—YEA!

Other King Features properties, such as Beetle Bailey and Krazy Kat, also appeared as rotating segments under the collective title: King Features Trilogy. The series was widely shown in TV syndication (although Snuffy's Song, The Hat, The Method and Maw, and Take Me to Your Gen'rul were released theatrically), with prolific voice actor Paul Frees providing the voices of both Snuffy and Barney. Ge Ge Pearson also doubled as Loweezy and Jughaid. A number of episodes feature animation by famed animator Jim Tyer.

All shorts directed by Seymour Kneitel except where indicated.

1962

- Snuffy's Song (Part 1 of a 30-minute special)
- The Hat (Part 3 of a 30-minute special)
- The Method and Maw (Part 2 of a 30-minute special)
- Take Me to Your Gen'rul

1963

- Snuffy's Turf Luck (First short produced, made in 1961) (directed by Jack Kinney)
- Pie in the Sky
- The Berkeley Squares
- The Shipwreckers
- The Master (First short with Snuffy's dog, Bullet)
- Barney Deals the Cars
- Snuffy Runs the Gamut
- The Tourist Trap
- Rip Van Snuffy (First short with Jughaid)
- Snuffy Goes to College
- Snuffy's Brush with Fame
- Give a Jail a Break
- Glove Thy Neighbor
- Snuffy's Fair Lady

1964

- Just Plain Kinfolk
- Off Their Rockers
- Snuffy Hits the Road
- My Kingdom for a Horse
- The Country Club Smiths
- Jughaid's Jumping Frog
- Turkey Shoot
- The Work Pill
- Jughaid for President
- Loweezy Makes a Match
- Fishin' Fools
- Little Red Jughaid
- Jughaid the Magician
- A Hoss Kin Dream
- It's Better to Give
- Springtime and Spark Plug
- There's No Feud Like an Old Feud
- A Hauntin' fer a House
- Feudin' and a-Fussin'
- Barney's Blarney
- Do Do That Judo
- Farm of the Future
- Gettin' Snuffy's Goat
- Barney's Winter Carnival
- Keeping Up with the Joneses
- The Big Bear Hunt (First short with Bizzy Buzz Buzz, and the last to have Jughaid)
- Ain't It the Tooth
- Bizzy Nappers
- The Buzz in Snuffy's Bonnet
- Settin' and a-Frettin' (Bizzy Buzz Buzz introduces herself to the audience, implying that this was the first produced short she appeared in)
- Beauty and the Beat (Last short with Barney Google)
- Smoke Screams (Has a cameo from Smokey the Bear)

Billy DeBeck's Barney Google (July 19, 1940)

=== Television special ===
Barney Google and Spark Plug appear in a sequence in the 1980 television special The Fantastic Funnies in which the 1923 "Barney Google" song is sung. The characters, by then largely discontinued, were featured alongside contemporary comic strip stars.
