= Harold Knerr =

American comic strip writer and artist (1882-1949)

- Born: Harold Hering Knerr; September 4, 1882 Bryn Mawr, Pennsylvania, U.S.
- Died: July 8, 1949 (aged 66) Manhattan, New York, U.S.
- Areas: Artist, writer
- Notable works: The Katzenjammer Kids

Harold Hering Knerr (September 4, 1882 – July 8, 1949), who signed his work H. H. Knerr, was an American comic strip creator. He was the writer-artist of the comic strip The Katzenjammer Kids for 35 years.

== Early life ==
Knerr was born September 4, 1882, in Bryn Mawr, Pennsylvania. His father Calvin B. Knerr, was a homeopath and colleague of Constantine Hering, a pioneer in homeopathy.

He attended the Pennsylvania Museum and School of Industrial Art.

== Career ==
Knerr worked as a newspaper illustrator. He recalled, "My first newspaper work was drawing pictures of gravestones atop the oldest graves in a local cemetery for The Philadelphia Record. These were paid for at the fee of three dollars each."

According to Knerr authority James Lowe, Knerr was extremely prolific, producing more than 1,500 Sunday comic pages between 1901 and 1914 for a half-dozen continuing features in three different Philadelphia newspapers.

He created his first comic strip, Zoo-Illogical Snapshots, for the Public Ledger. In 1902, he worked for The Philadelphia Inquirer and drew comic strips Mr. George and his Wife and Scary William. From 1903 to 1914, he drew The Fineheimer Twins, an imitation of The Katzenjammer Kids by Rudolph Dirks.

Knerr took over The Katzenjammer Kids Sunday strip in November 1914 when Dirks left the Hearst-owned New York Morning Journal after a legal dispute. During World War I, some newspapers retitled the strip as The Shenanigan Kids, and the nationality of the characters was changed to Dutch instead of German because of World War I anti-German sentiments. It changed back to its original name and contents in 1920. He continued to write and draw the strip until his death in 1949, when it was taken over by Charles H. Winner.

Knerr's continuation of The Katzenjammer Kids has been praised as "a particularly brilliant job... true to the spirit of the original, and yet stylistically his own."

On May 16, 1926, Knerr started Dinglehoofer und His Dog (sometimes titled Dinglehoofer und His Dog Adolph during the early 1930s), a topper that accompanied The Katzenjammer Kids until two years after Knerr's death. By 1936, to avoid any association with Adolf Hitler, the dog's name was changed to Schnappsy.

== Personal life ==
Knerr never married. In New York during the 1940s, he lived in the Hotel Blackstone at 50 East 58th Street. He died July 8, 1949, in Manhattan from heart disease. He was interred at West Laurel Hill Cemetery in Bala Cynwyd, Pennsylvania.

== Comic strips ==
- Zoo-Illogical Snapshots
- Mr. George and His Wife (1904–14)
- Hard Luck Bill (1903–04)
- Die Fineheimer Twins (1903–14)
- Scary William (1906–14)
- The Irresistible Rag (1913–14)
- The Katzenjammer Kids (1913–49)
- Dinglehoofer und His Dog (1926–49)

== See also ==
- List of American comics creators
