= Shirley Slesinger Lasswell =

American businessman

- Born: Shirley Ann Basso; May 27, 1923; Detroit, Michigan
- Died: July 19, 2007 (aged 84); Beverly Hills, California
- Occupations: Businessperson and performer
- Spouses: Stephen Slesinger (m. 1948; died 1953) Fred Lasswell (m. 1964; died 2001)

Shirley Slesinger Lasswell (May 27, 1923 – July 19, 2007) was an American marketer. She was the wife of comics artist Stephen Slesinger and, after his death, Fred Lasswell. She is furthermore best known for losing a lawsuit with The Walt Disney Company due to her company's judicial misconduct in a dispute over Winnie-the-Pooh royalties.

== Early and personal life ==
Lasswell was born Shirley Ann Basso in Detroit, Michigan on May 27, 1923. She was the daughter of Clara Louise Leasia and Michael Basso. She had one sister, Patricia Jane (Basso) Cornell.

Shirley Ann Basso performed in Olsen and Johnson Broadway musical comedies. She spent 30 months with the USO entertaining American troops at military bases and hospitals in Europe and the Pacific during World War II.

She met her first husband, producer Stephen Slesinger, while working on Broadway in 1947, and married him in 1948. Actress Clara Bow and her husband, actor Rex Bell, served respectively as the maid of honor and the best man at the Slesingers' wedding. The Slesingers lived in New York City and on their ranch in the Blanco Basin near Pagosa Springs, which provided the backdrop of Slesinger's Western films and summer programs for inner city youth. Their marriage lasted until Stephen Slesinger's death in 1953.

In 1964, she married Fred Lasswell, a Reuben Award-winning cartoonist and inventor, who drew the comic strip Barney Google and Snuffy Smith. Lasswell also invented the first practical citrus harvester and created creative educational programs for schools. The couple remained married until Fred Lasswell's death in 2001.

== Winnie the Pooh ==
Stephen Slesinger created brands and trademarks for literary and cartoon characters. He is credited with creating the image of Winnie-the-Pooh in his red shirt when he obtained exclusive rights from A. A. Milne, beginning in 1930. In exchange, Milne received 3% of sales and 15% to 50% of other Pooh rights Slesinger would commercialize. Slesinger's rights included exclusive rights of character and name reproduction in connection with goods and services and all media such as television, radio and any future sound, word and picture reproduction devices. The deal included the rights to Winnie-the-Pooh, as well as the other now famous characters in Milne's works, such as Christopher Robin, Eeyore, Tigger and Owl.

Stephen Slessinger died in 1953. His death left Lasswell a widow with a one-year-old daughter, Pati. Lasswell assumed leadership of her husband's company in 1956 and took over the marketing and licensing of Pooh along with Slesinger's other characters. She later said in an interview with the Los Angeles Times, "I thought, 'Now what do I do?' But it was right there for me. I decided to promote Pooh."

Lasswell initially began designing Winnie-the-Pooh related products, such as clothing, toys and dolls for sale at upscale American department stores in the 1950s under Stephen Slesinger, Inc. However, Lasswell also began to expand Winnie-the-Pooh into other markets. She was in the initial stages of developing Pooh for television when she met Walt Disney, founder and head of the Walt Disney Company. Disney wanted to create a television show featuring the Winnie-the-Pooh characters. Lasswell signed the first of two licensing agreements in 1961, which licensed the Walt Disney Company exclusive television rights and certain other rights owned by Stephen Slesinger, Inc., in exchange for royalty payments.

In 1991, Stephen Slesinger Inc. sued Disney, alleging the company had failed to pay Lasswell millions of dollars of additional Pooh royalties. The legal battle lasted 16 years, with both sides accused of misconduct, until a California state court judge threw out the main lawsuit in 2004. At the time of Lasswell's death, the decision was in the process of being appealed. In another legal action, a U.S. District Court judge dismissed a copyright lawsuit in 2007 that would have ended Disney’s obligation to pay Lasswell and her daughter merchandise royalties for Pooh.

== Death ==
Lasswell died on July 19, 2007.
