= Joe Beeler =

American illustrator, artist and sculptor (1931–2006)

Joe Neal Beeler
- Joe Beeler at work. Photo courtesy Pittsburg State University
- Born: December 25, 1931; Joplin, Missouri, US
- Died: April 26, 2006 (aged 74)
- Occupations: sculptor, illustrator, painter

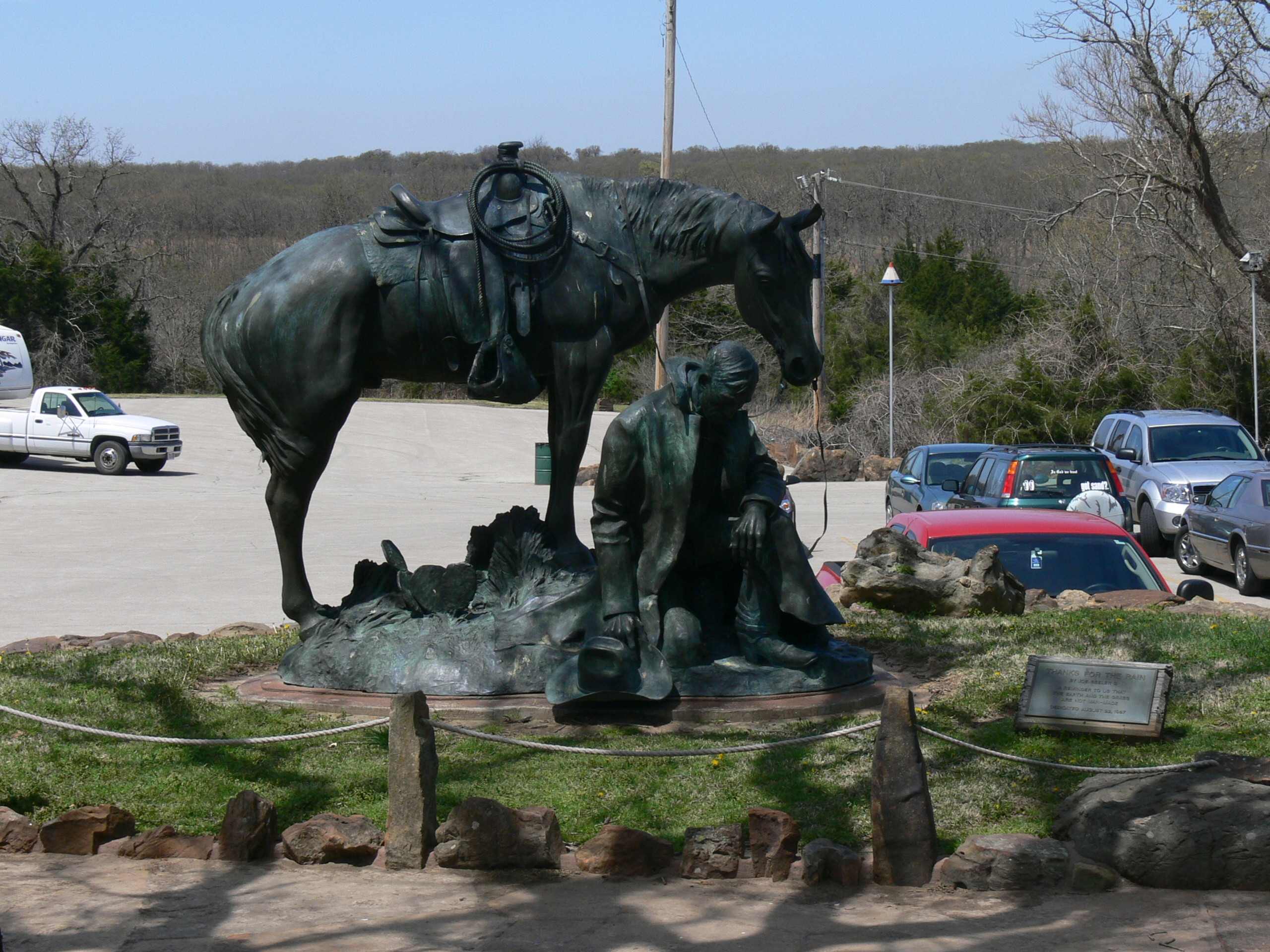
"Thanks for the rain" by Joe Beeler.

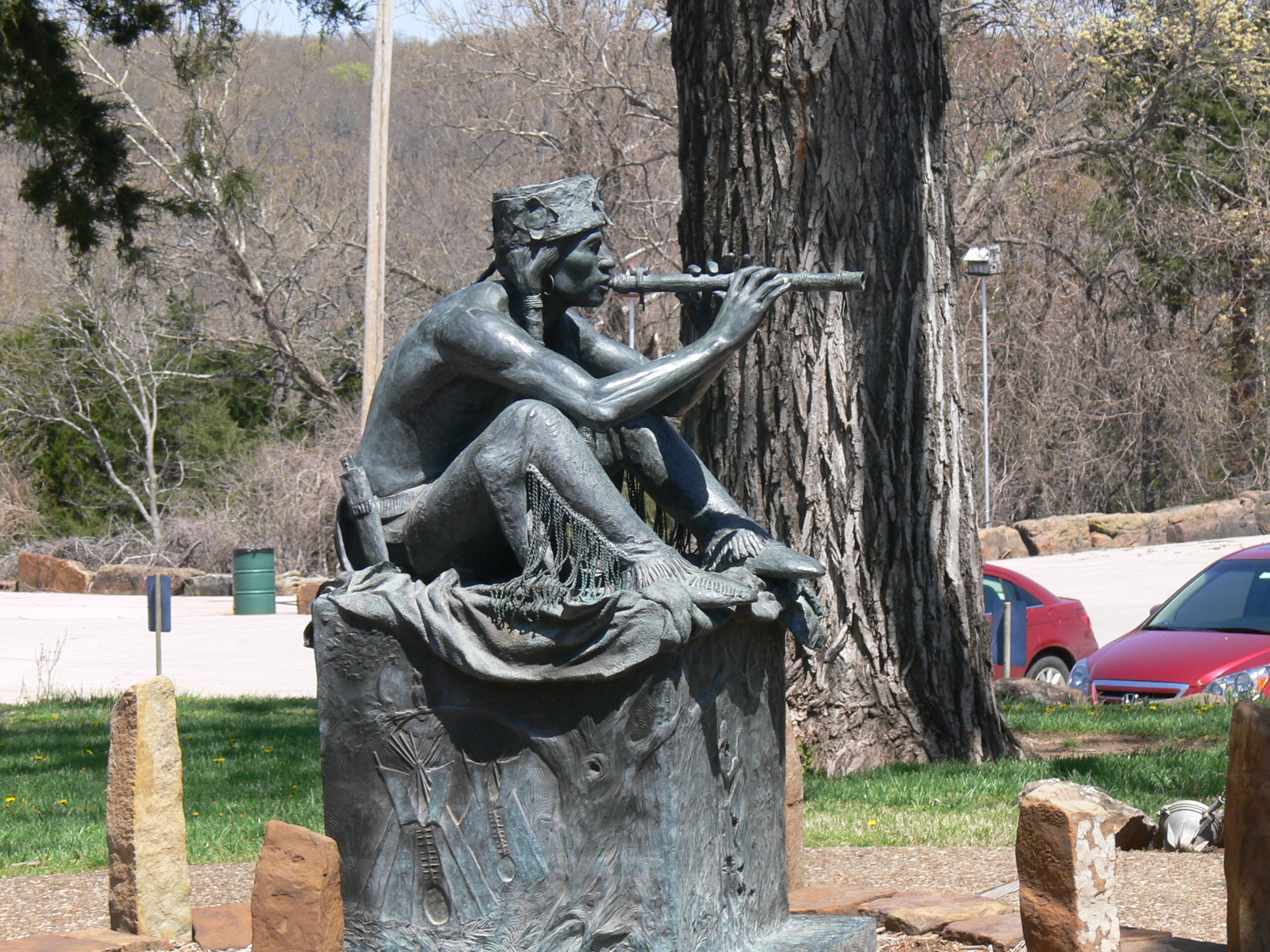
Night Song by Joe Beeler, at Woolaroc Museum

Joe Neil Beeler (1931–2006) was an American illustrator, artist, and sculptor specializing in the field of Western art. In 1965, he cofounded the Cowboy Artists of America (CAA) with Charlie Dye, John Hampton, and George Phippen.

== Personal information ==
Beeler was born on December 25, 1931, in Joplin, Missouri to Jack Beeler and Lean Setser. He self-identified as being of Cherokee descent.

At an early age, Beeler started drawing and continued throughout college at Kansas State Teachers College and later attended the Art Center of Design in Los Angeles, California. After his time in school, Beeler worked as an illustrator for the University of Oklahoma Press. Beeler's career progressed after his one-man performance at the Gilcrease Museum. In 1962, he and his family moved to Sedona, Arizona, where he died. In 1965, Beeler along with many other cowboy artists started the Cowboy Artists of America.

== Appearances ==
His works have been displayed in a number of museums including:

- Woolaroc Museum
- National Cowboy and Western Heritage Museum
- Montana Historical Society
- Charles M. Russell Museum
- Heard Museum
- Whitney Museum of American Art
- Institute of Texan Cultures

== Death ==
Joe Beeler died Wednesday April 26, 2006. He was helping neighbors and friends rope and brand calves when he succumbed to a heart attack. Joe was 74 years old.

== Sources and external links ==
- Joe Beeler on AskART
- CAA Museum – biography
- Joe Beeler obituary
- Joe Beeler's art
- The Joe Beeler Collection at Pittsburg State University
