= Comic Strip Classics =

1995 commerorative postage stamps

Commemorative Comic Strip Classics

The Comic Strip Classics series of commemorative postage stamps was issued by the United States Postal Service on October 1, 1995, to honor the centennial of the newspaper comic strip. The 20 stamps all are listed in the Scott catalogue as No. 3000 for a pane and 3000a through 3000t for the individual stamps.

Restricted to strips created before 1950, the series featured drawings of comic-strip characters with their logos. The stamps were arranged in five tiers with four stamps to a tier. The featured strips are listed here in the sequence as published:

- The Yellow Kid
- The Katzenjammer Kids
- Little Nemo in Slumberland
- Bringing Up Father
- Krazy Kat
- Rube Goldberg’s Inventions
- Toonerville Folks
- Gasoline Alley
- Barney Google
- Little Orphan Annie
- Popeye
- Blondie
- Dick Tracy
- Alley Oop
- Nancy
- Flash Gordon
- Li'l Abner
- Terry and the Pirates
- Prince Valiant
- Brenda Starr, Reporter
