= Doc Winner =

American cartoonist

Doc Winner

Charles H. Winner (December 18, 1885 – August 12, 1956), better known as Doc Winner, was an American cartoonist, notable for his comic strips Tubby and Elmer, plus his contributions to Thimble Theatre, Barney Google and other King Features strips.

Born in Perryville, Pennsylvania, Winner had seven brothers and two sisters, the children of Barbara and John Winner, a roofing contractor. His drawing skills soon led him to nearby Pittsburgh, as he recalled:

I fooled around a lot in school with art, covering the blackboard and all my books with sketches, and finally at 17, I went to art school in Pittsburgh, where I attended night classes for three years while working daily as a clerk in a tea and coffee store and later in the offices of the Pennsylvania Railroad.

== Editorial cartoons ==
He drew sports cartoons for two years at the Pittsburgh Post, succeeding Billy DeBeck, and became that newspaper's political cartoonist in 1910, relocating to the Harrisburg Patriot in 1914 and the Newark Star-Eagle in 1917. In 1923, he began his kid strip Tubby for United Feature Syndicate, as chronicled by comic strip historian Allan Holtz:

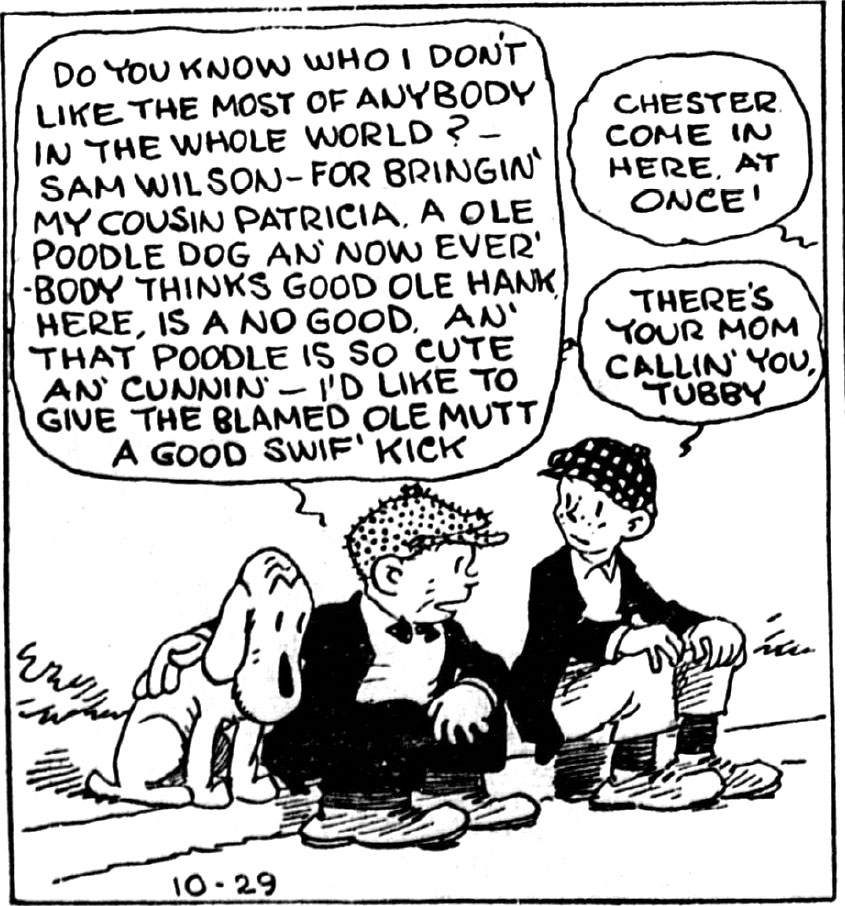
Panel from the comic strip "Tubby", October 29, 1925.

Doc Winner had a very long career in newspaper comics, the bulk of it spent picking up the pieces on strips that had lost their original creators... The strip was offered by United Feature Syndicate back in the days when they were a tiny outfit with just a few offerings. Later on, of course, United Features would take over all the Pulitzer and Metropolitan strips and become a major name in the syndication business. Tubby ran from March 19, 1923, to June 5, 1926, according to my best information, and the stock of dailies was then sold to reprint syndicates, so you'll find the strip popping up later as well. Winner's next job, starting just a few months later, was to take over Just Boy from A. C. Fera, and Winner pretty quickly turned that strip into a continuation of Tubby. Elmer, the main character of Just Boy, became all but indistinguishable from the title character of this strip.

Following the strip size of the period, Tubby was drawn five inches high and 19 inches wide. Winner's strip Elmer, which ran from 1926 to 1956, was based on the friends of his youth, as he recalled, "A great many of the stunts they do are ones we either did or tried to do when we were kids." In the late 1930s, Winner had his own Sunday page with Elmer positioned beneath Winner's Alexander Smart, Esq. and his Daffy Doodles (subtitled Dizzy Dramas from Our Readers) topper.

== King Features ==
Starting in the King Features bullpen in 1918, Winner worked with King Features for the next 38 years. At the time of E. C. Segar's illness and death, he was a ghost artist on Thimble Theatre during 1938 and 1939, continuing on some of the strip's Sunday pages in 1940. His Daffy Doodles and Elmer were reprinted in Ace Comics during the 1940s, and Elmer was seen again in Harvey's Family Funnies #6 (1951). Dell's Large Feature Comic reprinted his Thimble Theatre in 1941 and 1943. Elmer and His Dog was a 1935 Big Little Book.

In the final years of his life, Winner drew The Katzenjammer Kids (from 1947 to 1956). Winner lived with his wife, the former Agnes Reid, and two daughters in Upper Montclair, New Jersey.

== Death ==
He died of cancer in 1956, he was 71.
