= Fred Lasswell =

American cartoonist (1916–2001)

- Self-caricature of Fred Lasswell
- Born: July 25, 1916 Kennett, Missouri, U.S.
- Died: March 4, 2001 (aged 84) Tampa, Florida, U.S.
- Area: Cartoonist
- Notable works: Barney Google and Snuffy Smith
- Awards: National Cartoonists Society Humor Comic Strip Award, 1963; Reuben Award, 1963; Elzie Segar Award, 1984 & 1994
- Spouse: Shirley Slesinger Lasswell (m. 1964)

Fred D. Lasswell (July 25, 1916 – March 4, 2001) was an American cartoonist best known for his decades of work on the comic strip Barney Google and Snuffy Smith.

== Life and career ==
Though born in Kennett, Missouri, Lasswell spent most of his childhood in Gainesville, Florida, where his family moved in 1918. In Florida, Lasswell lived on a rural property with no electricity or water, an experience that is generally credited with inspiring Lasswell's portrayal of the rural setting of Barney Google and Snuffy Smith.

Lasswell began cartooning during his childhood; he was in third grade when his first comic strip, Baseball Hits, was published in the school newspaper, The Seminole Searchlight. He later began his professional career by working for Tampa Daily Times. In 1933, Lasswell drew a poster advertising the Tampa Chamber of Commerce Jamboree, which attracted the attention of Barney Google creator Billy DeBeck. Impressed with the poster, DeBeck hired Lasswell to assist him as a letterer. Only seventeen years old at the time, Lasswell dropped out of high school to take the job.

During this period, DeBeck wanted to expand the appeal of his comic strip by adding a hillbilly character to the cast. After he and Lasswell conducted a tour of the rural southern United States to research the culture of the region, the two cartoonists introduced the character Snuffy Smith to the strip in November 1934. Snuffy was immediately popular, leading to a surge in demand for the comic strip. Throughout the 1930s, DeBeck continued to mentor Lasswell, sending him to work with preeminent illustrators of the era and to study at the Art Students League of New York. After DeBeck's death in 1942, Lasswell subsequently took over as the lead cartoonist of Barney Google and Snuffy Smith.

Over the course of his career, Lasswell drew Barney Google and Snuffy Smith for 59 years, one of the longest careers in the field. He worked alongside several assistants during his career; these included Fred Rhoads, Ray Osrin, Tom Moore, Bob Weber, and Lasswell's eventual successor John R. Rose. Lasswell's longest-serving assistant was Bob Donovan, whose tenure on the strip lasted from 1957 to 1987.

=== World War II ===
During World War II, Lasswell served as a flight radio operator for Pan American Airways in North Africa. Later in the war, he joined the Marine Corps, where he created posters and illustrated military manuals.

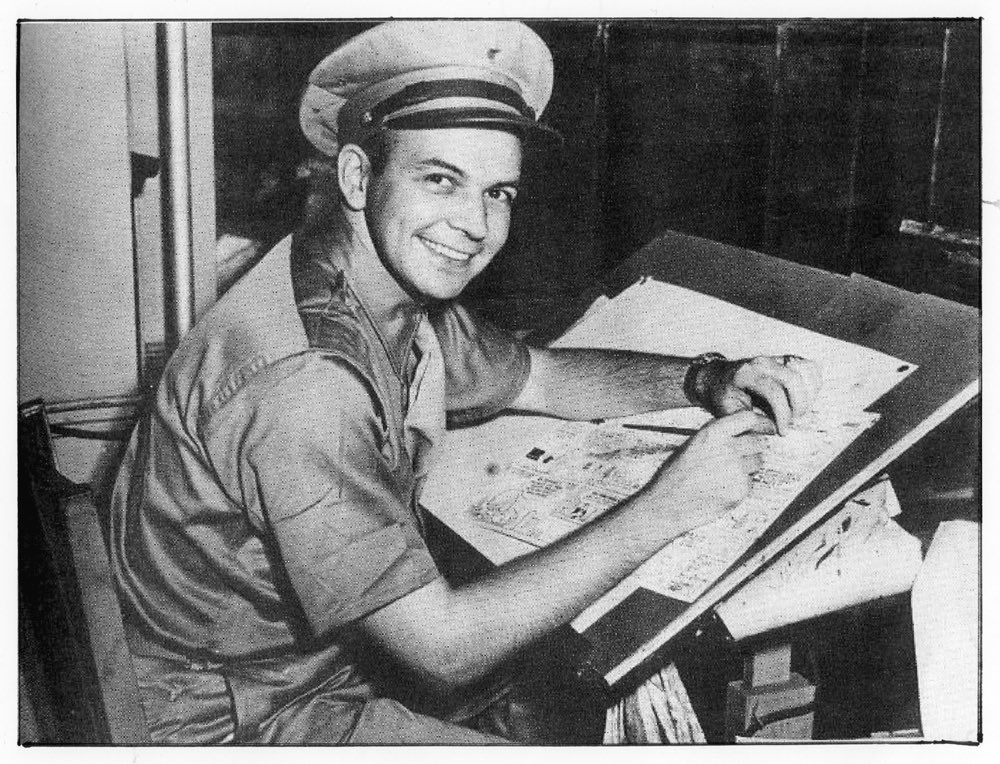
Fred Lasswell at the drawing board

Lasswell worked on all editions of Leatherneck Magazine, for which he created cover art, humorously illustrated stories, and the wartime comic strip Sgt. Hashmark.

=== Inventions and educational materials ===
Lasswell was a prolific inventor and early adopter of certain new technologies. His inventions included a Braille comic strip, as well as a mechanical citrus fruit harvester that he patented in 1962. In the 1990s, Lasswell became one of the first cartoonists to embrace computers in the production of his comic strip: he began lettering his comic digitally and submitting strips to King Features Syndicate by email. He also created a digital archive of his work, which was designed to provide reference material for future art teachers and students.

Beginning in the late 1970s, Lasswell ventured into the educational field, where he designed several educational games and books. His work was used to teach about the alphabet, fruits and vegetables, and environmental awareness. One of Lasswell's educational products, the "Uncle Fred's Draw and Color" series of videos, received the following praise from U.S. Secretary of Education Shirley Hufstedler: "Fred Lasswell has created a unique and whimsical way to bring fun and focus into our K-6 classrooms... The simplicity, low cost and genuine effectiveness of his teachers' manuals and methods, (for students at all levels of language proficiency) are a breath of fresh air for our children and their teachers." One video in the series, Draw and Color Far-Out Pets, also received a Parents Choice Award in 1987.

=== Views on cartooning ===
Fred Lasswell employed different art styles when he drew his Christmas cards each year, featuring characters from his comic strip.

In 1996, Lasswell reflected on the increase of social commentary into comic strips:

Now you have all these little messages all over the page. I feel like saying, "If they'll keep this stuff off the comics page, I promise to stay off the editorial page." I just try to do what tickles me. You can't go to school and take a course in sense of humor, and if you don't love this stuff, it gets to be just like chopping wood. It can be a real chore. I've always believed that creative talent gravitates to the marketplace. Someone told me once to always remember that there's never room at the bottom. But there's always room at the top.

== Personal life ==
Lasswell married Shirley Slesinger in 1964, and had three sons and a daughter. He died of heart failure in 2001. Upon Lasswell's death, production of Barney Google and Snuffy Smith was taken over by his assistant John R. Rose.

Lasswell was a member of the American Society of Agricultural Engineers.

== Legacy and honors ==
Fred Lasswell received several honors from the National Cartoonists Society; in 1963, he was awarded both the Reuben Award for Outstanding Cartoonist of the Year and the National Cartoonists Society Award for the Best Humor Strip. Lasswell also received the Elzie Segar Award twice, in 1984 and 1994, making him (alongside Mort Walker) one of the only two cartoonists to receive the award twice. In 2000, the University of South Florida awarded Lasswell an honorary Doctor of Humane Letters degree. Lasswell was also awarded by the Banshees Society, a New York-based association of media professionals, who gave him the Silver Lady Award in 1962.

Lucy Shelton Caswell, Professor and Curator of the Cartoon Research Library at Ohio State University, has described Lasswell as "one of the few cartoonists to inherit a successfully syndicated comic strip and transform it into his own creation". Cartoonist R.C. Harvey memorializes Lasswell as follows:

He was "Uncle Fred" to his colleagues in the National Cartoonist Society. He was an actively contributing member to the convivialities of the group for almost its entire existence, and no Reuben Weekend was complete without some shenanigan from Uncle Fred. Even the last year when he didn't attend, an unprecedented occurrence, he supplied punchlines for others standing at the microphone: all you had to do was refer to Uncle Fred—to one or another of his well-known proclivities—and you could get a laugh. Even though absent in person, he was present. His picture was on the cover of the program booklet. And one of the souvenirs of the event was a flip book featuring Uncle Fred in action.
