= John Dirks (cartoonist) =

American cartoonist and sculptor

- Born: November 2, 1917 New York City, U.S.
- Died: January 26, 2010 (aged 92) Mystic, CT
- Area: Cartoonist
- Notable works: The Captain and the Kids
- Spouse: Mary Dirks (m. 1954; died 2004)

John Dirks (November 2, 1917 – January 26, 2010) was an American cartoonist and sculptor.

== Family ==
Born in New York City, John was the second child of cartoonist Rudolph Dirks (1877–1968), original creator of The Katzenjammer Kids and The Captain and the Kids. His older sister, Barbara, was born in 1914.

John was married to Mary Dirks from 1954 to her death in 2004.

== Career ==
John Dirks studied English and fine arts at the Yale University where he took his degree in 1939. After serving in World War II, he began to assist his father on the comic strip The Captain and the Kids in the 1940s, taking over the strip around 1955. However, John would not sign the strip until after his father's death in 1968. He modernized the strip, introducing new characters and elements of science fiction in the stories. He wrote and drew the strip until it was cancelled by United Feature Syndicate in 1979. (His father's original strip, The Katzenjammer Kids, continued to be drawn by other artists until the early 2000s.)

After retiring from cartooning, John Dirks became an avid sculptor, installing numerous fountains at various places in the world.. He died in Mystic CT in 2010 of a heart attack at age 92.
