= The Katzenjammer Kids =

1897-2006 American comic strip

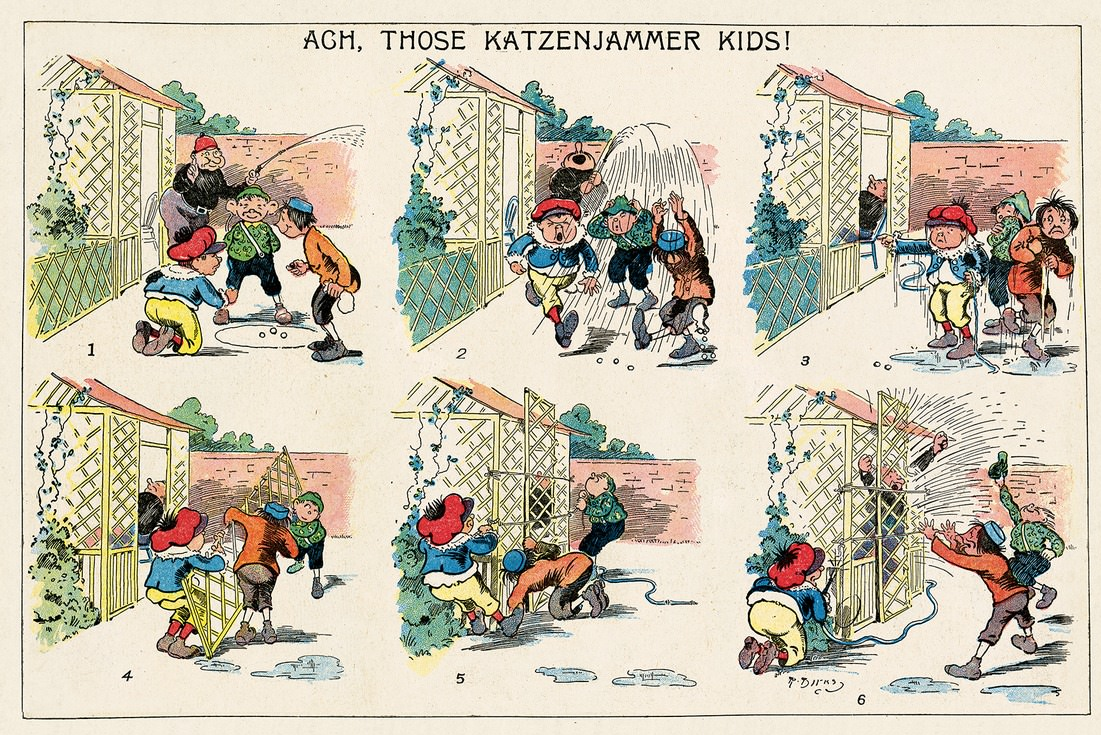
- First appearance of Rudolph Dirks' The Katzenjammer Kids (1897)
- Author(s): Rudolph Dirks (creator, 1897–1913); Harold Knerr (1914–1949); Doc Winner (1949–1956); Joe Musial (1956–1977); Mike Senich (1977–1981); Angelo DeCesare (1981–1986); Hy Eisman (1986–2006)
- Current status/schedule: Concluded; in reprints
- Launch date: December 12, 1897; 128 years ago
- End date: 2006; 20 years ago
- Alternate name: The Shenanigan Kids
- Syndicate: King Features Syndicate
- Genre: Humor

The Katzenjammer Kids is an American comic strip created by Rudolph Dirks in 1897 and later drawn by Harold Knerr for 35 years (1914 to 1949). It debuted on December 12, 1897, in the American Humorist, the Sunday supplement of William Randolph Hearst's New York Journal. The comic strip was turned into a stage play in 1903. It inspired several animated cartoons and was one of 20 strips included in the Comic Strip Classics series of American commemorative postage stamps.

After a series of legal battles between 1912 and 1914, Dirks left the Hearst organization and began a new strip, first titled Hans and Fritz and then The Captain and the Kids. It featured the same characters seen in The Katzenjammer Kids, which was continued by Knerr. The two separate versions of the strip competed with each other until 1979, when The Captain and the Kids ended its six-decade run. The Katzenjammer Kids published its last original strip in 2006, but is still distributed in reprints by King Features Syndicate, making it the oldest comic strip still in syndication and the longest-running ever.

== History ==
=== Creation and early years ===
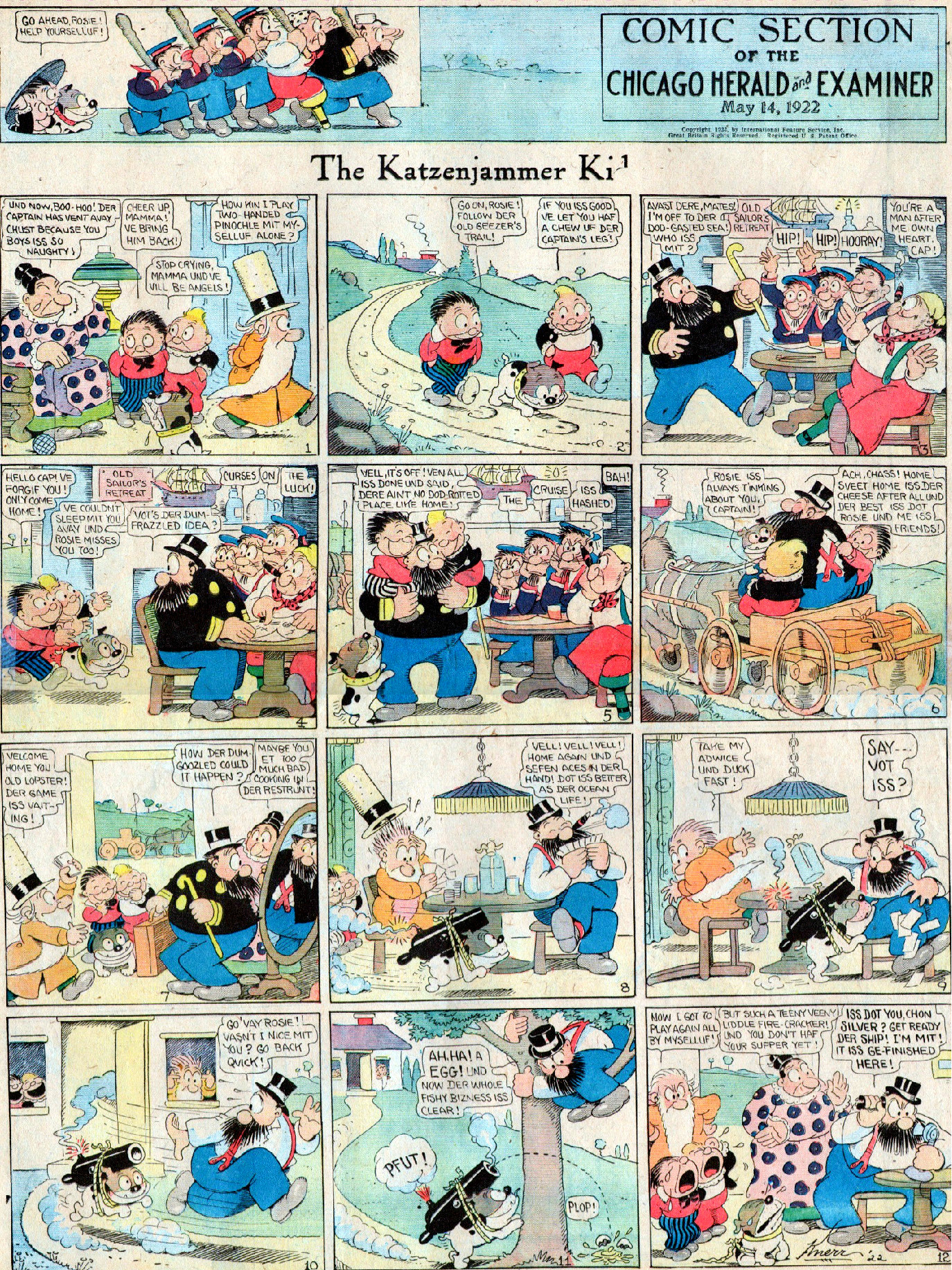
A Sunday comic strip from May 14, 1922, by Harold Knerr.

The Katzenjammer Kids was inspired by Max and Moritz, a children's story of the 1860s by German author Wilhelm Busch.

Katzenjammer translates literally as the wailing of cats - i.e. "caterwaul". However, it is also used to mean contrition after a failed endeavor or hangover in German (and, in the latter sense, in English too). Whereas Max & Moritz were grotesquely but comically put to death after seven destructive pranks, the Katzenjammer Kids and the other characters still thrive.

=== Dirks and Knerr ===
The Katzenjammer Kids was so popular that it became two competing comic strips and the subject of a lawsuit. This happened because Dirks, in 1912, wanted to take a break after drawing the strip for 15 years, but the Hearst newspaper syndicate would not allow it. Dirks left anyway, and the strip was taken over by Harold Knerr. Dirks' last strip appeared March 16, 1913. Various ghost artists then apparently did the strip for a few months. Dirks sued, and after a long legal battle, the Hearst papers were allowed to continue The Katzenjammer Kids, with Knerr as writer and artist. He took over permanently in the summer of 1914, but Dirks was allowed to create an almost identical strip of his own for the rival Pulitzer newspapers, although he had to use a different name for the strip.

=== The Captain and the Kids ===
The Captain and the Kids
- John Dirks' The Captain and the Kids (February 29, 1976)
- Author: Rudolph Dirks (1914–c. 1955); John Dirks (c. 1955–1979)
- Current status/schedule: Concluded mostly Sunday strip
- Launch date: 1914; 112 years ago
- End date: 1979; 47 years ago
- Alternate name: Hans und Fritz
- Syndicate(s): World Feature Service (1914–1931); United Feature Syndicate (1931–1979)
- Publisher: United Feature
- Genre: Humor

Initially named Hans und Fritz after the two naughty protagonist brothers, Dirks' new feature debuted on June 7, 1914. It was called The Captain and the Kids from 1918 on. The Captain and the Kids was very similar to The Katzenjammer Kids in terms of content and characters, but Dirks had a looser and more verbal style than Knerr, who on the other hand often produced stronger, more direct gags and drawings. The Captain and the Kids soon proved equal in popularity to The Katzenjammer Kids. It was later distributed by the United Feature Syndicate, while Hearst's King Features distributed The Katzenjammer Kids.

=== 1950s to the present ===
The Captain and the Kids expanded as a daily strip during the 1930s, but it had only a short run. However, the Sunday strip remained popular for decades. From 1946, Dirks' son, John Dirks, gradually began doing more of the work on The Captain and the Kids. They introduced new characters and plots during the 1950s, including a 1958 science fiction storyline about a brilliant inventor and alien invasions. Even as John Dirks took over most of the work, Rudolph Dirks signed the strip until his death in 1968. John Dirks' drawing shifted slightly towards a more square-formed line, though it maintained the original style until The Captain and the Kids ended its run in 1979.

Knerr continued drawing The Katzenjammer Kids until his death in 1949; the strip was then written and drawn by C.H. "Doc" Winner (1949–1956), with Joe Musial taking over in 1956. Musial was replaced on The Katzenjammer Kids by Mike Senich (1976–1981), Angelo DeCesare (1981–1986), and Hy Eisman (1986–2006). Now syndicated in reprint form, the strip is distributed internationally to some 50 newspapers and magazines. Eisman reused a lot of old gags and stories in later years.

While there hasn't been an original strip since 2006, characters have guest appeared in the Popeye Sunday strips, written and drawn by Randy Milholland, including a storyline where Popeye and Olive encounter Papa Katzenjammer, who had been captured by the sister of the Sea Hag along with other forgotten comic strip characters and the following storyline where they're reuniting him with his family.

== Characters and story ==
The Katzenjammer Kids (three brothers in the first strip but soon reduced to two) featured Hans and Fritz, twins who rebelled against authority, particularly in the form of their mother, Mama; der Captain, a sailor who acted as a surrogate father; and der Inspector, a long-bearded school official. Other characters included John Silver, a pirate sea captain; the Herring Brothers, John Silver's three-man crew; and King Bongo, a primitive-living but sophisticated-acting Black jungle monarch who ruled a tropical island.

As originally created, Mama's husband was Papa Katzenjammer, her brother was the bungling sailor Heinie, and der Captain–introduced in 1902—was Heinie's boss. After a short while, Papa was dropped from the strip without explanation, with der Captain taking over his function. By the 1940s, der Captain and Mama were often presented as a de facto couple.

The immediate Katzenjammer family usually spoke stereotypical German-accented English. When first introduced, der Captain and der Inspector did not, but within months adopted the accent as well. During World Wars I and II, when the United States was at war with Germany, the Katzenjammer family were temporarily presented as Dutch.

The defining theme of the strip was Hans and Fritz pranking der Captain, der Inspector, Mama, or all three, for which the boys were often spanked, but sometimes shifted the blame to others. Other stories involved der Captain taking the Katzenjammers on treasure hunts or cargo voyages, sometimes aided by or competing with John Silver. Still other stories involved King Bongo enlisting the Katzenjammers to run errands or go on missions related to his kingdom; in both strips, by the mid-1930s, the family lived on Bongo's island—usually called Squee-Jee—and were readily at hand.

Knerr's version of The Katzenjammer Kids introduced several major new characters in the 1930s. Miss Twiddle, a pompous tutor, and her brainy niece Lena came to stay permanently with the Katzenjammers in early 1936. Later in the year, Twiddle's ex-pupil, "boy prodigy" Rollo Rhubarb joined them. The ever-smug Rollo is always trying to outwit Hans and Fritz, but his cunning plans often backfire.

The Captain and the Kids also introduced some new characters. Ginga Dun is a snooty Indian trader who can outsmart almost anyone and talks only in verse. Captain Bloodshot is a pint-sized pirate rival of John Silver.

Notable features of the later strips, at both syndicates, included a more constructive relationship between the Captain and the boys, who sometimes bickered like friendly rivals rather than pranking each other outright. The King and his people, also in both strips, were now Polynesian rather than African.

== In other media ==
Policy and Pie (The Katzenjammer Kids) part 1 of 2 (1918)

Policy and Pie (The Katzenjammer Kids) part 2 of 2 (1918)

=== The Katzenjammer Kids ===
==== Live-action films ====
The Katzenjammer Kids characters initially appeared outside comics in two live-action silent films. The first film, titled The Katzenjammer Kids in School released in 1898, was made for the Biograph Company by William George Bitzer. The second film, titled The Katzenjammer Kids in Love, was released in 1900.

==== Theatrical animated shorts ====
Between December 1916 and August 1918, a total of 37 Katzenjammer Kids silent cartoon shorts were produced by William Randolph Hearst's own cartoon studio International Film Service, which adapted Hearst's well-known comic strips. The series was retired in 1918 at the height of the characters' popularity – partly because of the growing tension against titles with German associations after World War I. The comic strip was briefly renamed The Shenanigan Kids around this time, and in 1920 another five cartoons were produced under this title. All Katzenjammer Kids/Shenanigan Kids cartoons from International Film Services were directed (and most likely also animated) by Gregory La Cava. The series was transferred and continued by Bray Productions in 1920.

==== Television ====
The Katzenjammer Kids also appeared (along with other King Features comic-strip stars) in Hal Seeger's TV special Popeye Meets the Man Who Hated Laughter (1972).

=== The Captain and the Kids ===
==== Theatrical animated shorts ====
In 1938, The Captain and the Kids became the subject of Metro-Goldwyn-Mayer's first self-produced series of theatrical animated cartoons, directed by William Hanna, Robert Allen and Friz Freleng. Unlike the strip, which focused most of all on the gruesomely amusing antics of Hans and Fritz, the MGM cartoons often centered on the Captain. The series was overall unsuccessful, ending after one year and a total of 15 cartoons. Following that cancellation, Freleng returned to Warner Bros. Cartoons, where he had earlier been an animation director. The Captain was voiced by Billy Bletcher, Mama was voiced by Martha Wentworth, and John Silver was voiced by Mel Blanc.

==== Television ====
The Captain and the Kids version of the strip was also animated for television as a segment on Filmation's Archie's TV Funnies in 1971, and in the spin-off series Fabulous Funnies from 1978 to 1979.

== Cultural legacy ==
- In 1929, The Katzenjammers and The Inspector would become the first licensed characters to appear as giant balloons in the Macy's Thanksgiving Day Parade (despite claims that Felix the Cat, who appeared in 1932, was first). The balloons would return for the 1930 parade and later in the 2016 parade, being represented as puppets on a float honoring the ballon’s designer, Tony Sarg. The Inspector balloon would also be featured in the 2016 film Ghostbusters alongside other early parade balloons.
- In July 2009, a street in Heide, Germany (where Dirks was born) was named after the cartoonist.

=== The Katzenjammer Kids ===
- Mad Magazine #20 featured "The Katchandhammer Kids", a spoof by Will Elder and Harvey Kurtzman.
- The Katzenjammer Kids are still very popular in Denmark and Norway (where they are known as Knoll og Tott); in both countries, an annual comic book has been published almost every Christmas since 1911 (the only exceptions reportedly being 1913 and 1944). For the most part, Harold Knerr's version of the comic is used in these annual comic books. In Sweden, the annual Katzenjammer Kids comic book was also a tradition for many years, from 1928 to 1977.
- Art Clokey, the creator of Gumby, has claimed that The Katzenjammer Kids inspired the creation of Gumby's nemeses, The Block-heads.
- Playboy frequently featured in its late 1970s-early 1980s "Playboy Funnies" pages a spoof of The Katzenjammer Kids, called The Krautzenbummer Kids, with adult-style gags.
- French dark cabaret band Katzenjammer Kabarett is named in a homage to the strip, as is the Norwegian symphonic pop/swing group Katzenjammer.
- Deputy Barney Fife makes a reference to the Katzenjammer Kids in the third season of The Andy Griffith Show, in the episode titled "Andy and the New Mayor". It is also referenced in season 1 episode "The Inspector", and in season 3, "Andy's Rich Girfriend".
- In the film, Inglourious Basterds, Lt. Archie Hicox is interviewed by Gen. Ed Fenech. Reading his briefing notes, Gen. Fenech states, "It says here that you speak German fluently". To this, Lt. Hicox reassures the general by saying, "Like a Katzenjammer Kid".
- In the documentary film, Poto and Cabengo, narrator Jean-Pierre Gorin makes references to The Katzenjammer Kids.
- In an episode of American Dad! titled "Black Mystery Month", Steve Smith reads a Katzenjammer Kids comic in an old newspaper.
- In a season 5 episode of The Marvelous Mrs. Maisel, Joel Maisel tells Suzie Meyerson that she's not cute even though she dresses like a "Katzenjammer Kid".

=== The Captain and the Kids ===
- The Captain and the Kids has been published as an annual comic book in Norway since 1987. When no more reproducible material was available in 2001, Per Sanderhage, the editor of the Danish comic strip agency PIB, negotiated a deal where Ferd'nand cartoonist Henrik Rehr would redraw 32 pages loosely based on old magazine clippings for the annual. This arrangement continues to this day.
