= EQ2 =

EQ2 or variation, may refer to:

- EverQuest II, an MMO-RPG released in 2004
- The Equalizer 2, an action film released in 2018
- Sky-Watcher EQ2, a telescope equatorial mount
- Chery eQ2, an electric car

== See also ==
- EQ (disambiguation)
- Q2 (disambiguation)
- E2 (disambiguation)
- 2 (disambiguation)
