= Phil Epp =

American painter

Phil Epp (born August 28, 1946, in Henderson, Nebraska), is an American artist known for his paintings, murals, prints and sculpture. Much of his work takes is inspiration from the cloudscapes and landscapes of Kansas and the American Southwest. Low horizons broken by wild horses or agricultural buildings, saturated blue skies, and stylized clouds are typical of Epp's easel paintings, often rendered in acrylic. His prints—lithographs and various kinds of etching—typically feature similar landscape features as his easel paintings. Epp also has received a number of public mural and sculpture commissions. He also produces animal sculptures. He maintains an active studio near Newton, Kansas.

Epp, who was raised in the Mennonite church, enjoyed art from a young age and began formal art studies at the Mennonite-affiliated Bethel College (Kansas) in 1965 under the tutelage of Bob Regier, Paul Friesen, and Mike Almanza. After his college career was interrupted by alternative government service during the Vietnam era draft, he graduated in 1972.

Following graduation, Epp taught art in the Newton, Kansas public schools for 30 years, retiring in 20 "03.

In 1985, he received the Kansas Governor's Art award.

In 2008, his "Blue Sky Sculpture" in Newton, Kansas, was voted one of the Kansas Sampler Foundation's Eight Wonders of Kansas Art.

In 2016, Epp became a member of Cowboy Artists of America.

Epp is represented by the Reuben Saunders Gallery in Wichita, Kansas, the Alexandra Stevens Gallery in Santa Fe, New Mexico, the Leopold Gallery in Kansas City, Missouri and the Modern West Gallery in Salt Lake City, Utah.

His wife, Karen, is also an artist. The Epps have two children.

== Solo exhibitions ==
- Miles from Town: Phil Epp / Carriage Factory Gallery [Newton, Kansas] / 2014

== Public artworks ==
- The Glory of the Hills (Flint Hills Landscape) / Mural / 1998 / 110 North Main Street, Eldorado, Kansas.
- Blue Sky Sculpture / Sculpture / 2001 / Centennial Park, Newton, Kansas.
