= Epp Petrone =

Estonian writer, blogger, publisher

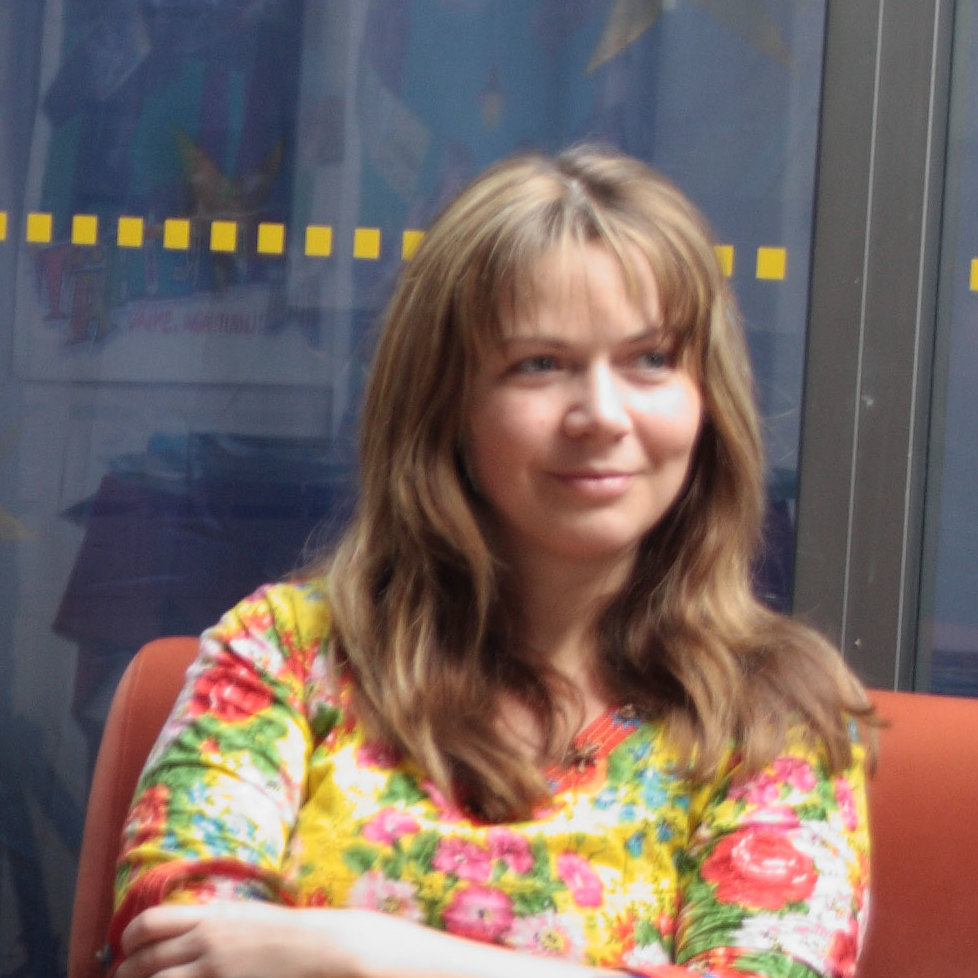
Epp Petrone (2010)

Epp Petrone (née Saluveer; from 1995 to 2003, Epp Väljaots; born 20 July 1974 in Viljandi) is an Estonian writer, journalist, blogger, and publisher.

In 2007, she founded the publishing house Petrone Print. The publishing house publishes travel-related "My-series". Each book of this series describes some place in the world. For example, in 2007 she published Minu Ameerika (My America).

2006–2010, she was a member of the party Estonian Greens.

== Works ==
- 2000s: several "My-series" books (included in 2007 "Minu Ameerika" ('My America'))
- 2008: story: "Roheliseks kasvamine" ('Growing Green')
- 2009: children's book "Marta varbad" ('Marta's Toes')
- 2010: travelogue "Kas süda on ümmargune?" ('Is the Heart Round?')
