= Rudolph Dirks =

American cartoonist (1877–1968)

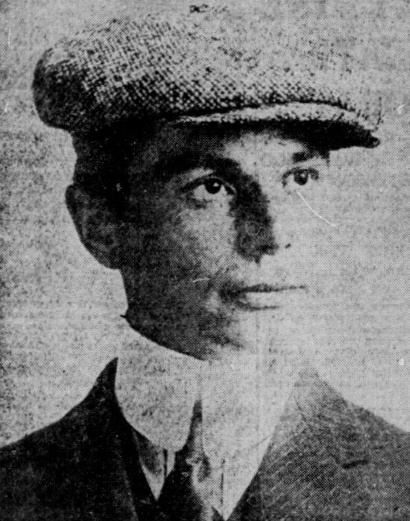
- Rudolph Dirks in 1914
- Born: February 26, 1877 Heide, Schleswig-Holstein Province, German Empire
- Died: April 20, 1968 (aged 91) New York City, U.S.
- Area: Cartoonist
- Notable works: The Katzenjammer Kids

Rudolph Dirks (February 26, 1877 – April 20, 1968) was an American cartoonist who was one of the earliest and most noted comic strip artists, well known for The Katzenjammer Kids (later known as The Captain and the Kids).

Dirks was born in Heide, Germany, to Johannes and Margaretha Dirks. When he was seven years old, his father, a woodcarver, moved the family to Chicago, Illinois. After having sold various cartoons to local magazines Rudolph moved to New York City and found work as a cartoonist. His younger brother Gus soon followed his example. He held several jobs as an illustrator, which culminated in a position with William Randolph Hearst's New York Journal.

The circulation war between the Journal and Joseph Pulitzer's New York World was raging. The World had a huge success with the full-color Sunday feature, Down in Hogan's Alley, better known as the Yellow Kid, starting in 1895. Editor Rudolph Block asked Dirks to develop a Sunday comic based on Wilhelm Busch's cautionary tale, Max and Moritz. When Dirks submitted his sketches, Block dubbed them The Katzenjammer Kids, and the first strip appeared on December 12, 1897. Gus Dirks assisted his brother with The Katzenjammer Kids during the first few years until his suicide on June 10, 1902.

== Comics competition ==
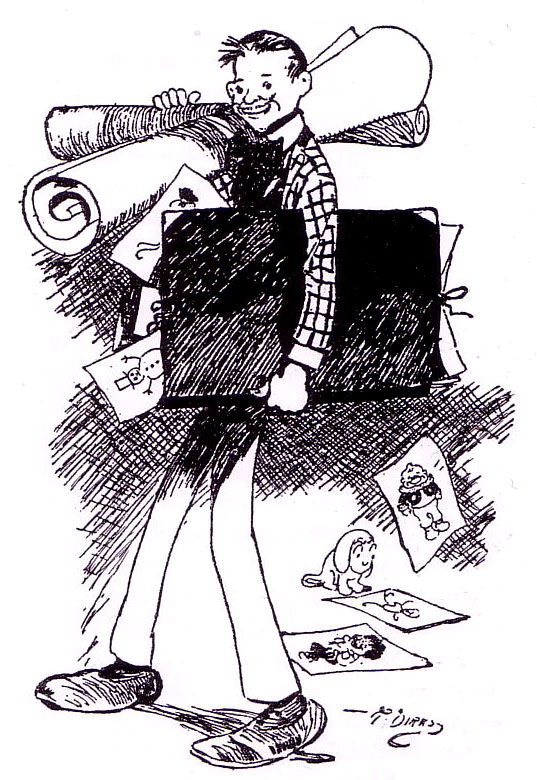
Dirks's self-caricature

Dirks took time off from his Journal work to serve his country in the Spanish–American War and on other occasions. In 1912, he requested a year's leave to tour Europe with his wife. The request led to a rupture with the Journal. After a lengthy and notorious legal battle, the federal courts ruled that Dirks had the right to continue to draw his characters for a rival newspaper chain but that the Journal retained the right to the title The Katzenjammer Kids. Dirks thereupon began drawing a comic strip titled Hans and Fritz for the World, beginning in 1914. Anti-German sentiment during World War I led to the strip being renamed The Captain and the Kids. The Journal chose H. H. Knerr to continue The Katzenjammer Kids, and he and his successors have carried it on to the present day. The Captain and the Kids was distributed by United Feature Syndicate while King Features Syndicate handled The Katzenjammer Kids.

Rudolph Dirks's The Captain and the Kids (January 21, 1945)

The success of The Katzenjammer Kids was due to more than just lucky circumstances. Dirks was a gifted cartoonist with superb timing and a colorful gallery of different characters, including Hans and Fritz, Der Captain, Der Inspector and Mama. In the mid-1950s, a romantic swindler named Fineas Flub was introduced to the strip. Characters such as Rollo never appeared in Dirks's version of the strip.

== Strip icons ==
Dirks made substantial contributions to the graphic language of comic strips. Although not the first to use sequential panels or speech balloons, he was influential in their wider adoption. He also popularized such icons as speed lines, "seeing stars" for pain, and "sawing wood" for snoring.

As a pastime, Dirks produced serious paintings associated with the Ashcan School. Like many of his cartoonist colleagues, he was an avid golfer. Dirks incrementally passed his cartooning duties on to his son John Dirks, who took over The Captain and the Kids around 1955. The elder Dirks died in New York City in 1968.
