= Jewish Big Sisters =

American communal organization

The Jewish Big Sisters was a communal organization established in 1912 to offer support to Jewish children arraigned in the Children's Courts of New York City.

== History ==
=== Founding ===
Jewish Big Sisters was an outgrowth of the Big Brothers Big Sisters movement which started its activities in New York City in 1902, seeking to provide mentorship to boys (and eventually girls) who went through the Children's Courts. As more Jewish boys and girls found their way into the court system, support materialized for the formation of organizations first for boys and then for girls with the aim of preventing delinquency.

The organization was founded in 1912 (Note: The Jewish communal register of New York City, 1917-1918 states the founding as 1913. A New York Times article from 1917 infers the organization started in 1912 but wasn't called Jewish Big Sisters until 1913.) by Mrs. Sidney C. (Madeleine) Borg, who was a volunteer in Children's Court. She lamented the lack of qualified staff to deal with growing numbers of girls she found in court, and established the organization with the initial recruitment of six volunteers to help deal with individual cases. These volunteers also became role models for the girls. In 1917, the organization had over 450 Little Sisters and 175 active Big Sisters helping girls whose fathers were fighting in World War I and mothers were often working away from home.

A Jewish Big Sisters organization was founded in Chicago in 1916 and in Cleveland in 1920.

=== Activities ===
The work of the Jewish Big Sisters involved visits to the home of the individual "little sister" in cooperation with the central office in order to work on specific cases. A professional would make preliminary visits and at the appropriate time, a big sister would be assigned to the individual. Frequent reports on progress were required. By 1917, the organization had a staff of 250.

Borg also lobbied for legislation to aid children. At a 40th anniversary celebration in 1952, she promoted concern about the designation of "delinquent," pointing out that the term implied conviction of a felony although the individuals may not have been convicted of any crime. She also noted that, when she first started, children were classified as either "good" or "bad" but that now they were called "sick".

Other North American Jewish Big Sister organizations also provided medical care and scholarships, and clothing and furnishing and outings for handicapped girls.

== See also ==
- Big Brothers Big Sisters of New York City
- Big Brothers Big Sisters of America
