= Richard Epp (physicist) =

Canadian physicist

Richard J. Epp is a physicist and lecturer currently working at the University of Waterloo.

Epp received his master's degree in electrical engineering from the University of Manitoba and also completed his PhD in theoretical physics at the same institution on quantum field theory. After finishing graduate school, he held post-doctoral research positions at international institutions including the Raman Research Institute in Bangalore, India and the University of California, Davis. Additionally, he is the Senior Manager of Educational Outreach at the Perimeter Institute for Theoretical Physics and is the founder and main lecturer during the International Summer School for Young Physicists program (ISSYP) held at the University of Waterloo and the Perimeter Institute for Theoretical Physics every year.

== Research contributions ==
Richard Epp has worked on many different areas of physics, ranging from quantum mechanics to black holes and general relativity. The following is a list of papers published according to institution:

- University of Manitoba
  - Dirac versus Reduced Quantization of the Poincare Symmetry in Scalar Electrodynamics
- University of California - Davis
  - On the interpretation of time re-parametrization-invariant quantum mechanics
  - The symplectic structure of general relativity in the double null (2+2) formalism
- Raman Research Institute
  - Angular momentum and an invariant quasilocal energy in general relativity
- University of Waterloo
  - A New Approach to Black Hole Microstates
  - A Statistical Mechanical Interpretation of Black Hole Entropy Based on an Orthonormal Frame Action
  - Rigid motion revisited: rigid quasilocal frames
