= George Phippen =

American artist (1915–1966)

George Phippen (July 11, 1915 – April 13, 1966) was an American sculptor and painter from Arizona. He was the co-founder and first president of the Cowboy Artists of America. He is the namesake of the Phippen Museum in Prescott, Arizona.

== Early life ==
Phippen was born in 1915 in Charles City, Iowa. He grew up as a cowboy in Kansas, and he received no formal art education. When he was serving in World War II, he taught himself to paint. After the war, he briefly worked with artist Henry Balink in Santa Fe, New Mexico.

== Career ==
Over the course of twenty years, Phippen did approximately 3,000 works in his brief career. He was a sculptor and painter in representational style of western genre, figures, horses and cattle. His work included the bronze sculpture Cowboy in a Storm.

Phippen was a member of the Mountain Artists Guild. He was also a co-founder of the Cowboy Artists of America, and he served as its first president.

== Personal life, death and legacy ==
Phippen married Louise Goble. They had five children, and they resided in Skull Valley near Prescott, Arizona.

Phippen died of cancer in 1966 in Skull Valley, at age 50. The Phippen Museum was established in 1975. His widow authored a book about him in 1983.
