= List of American comics creators =

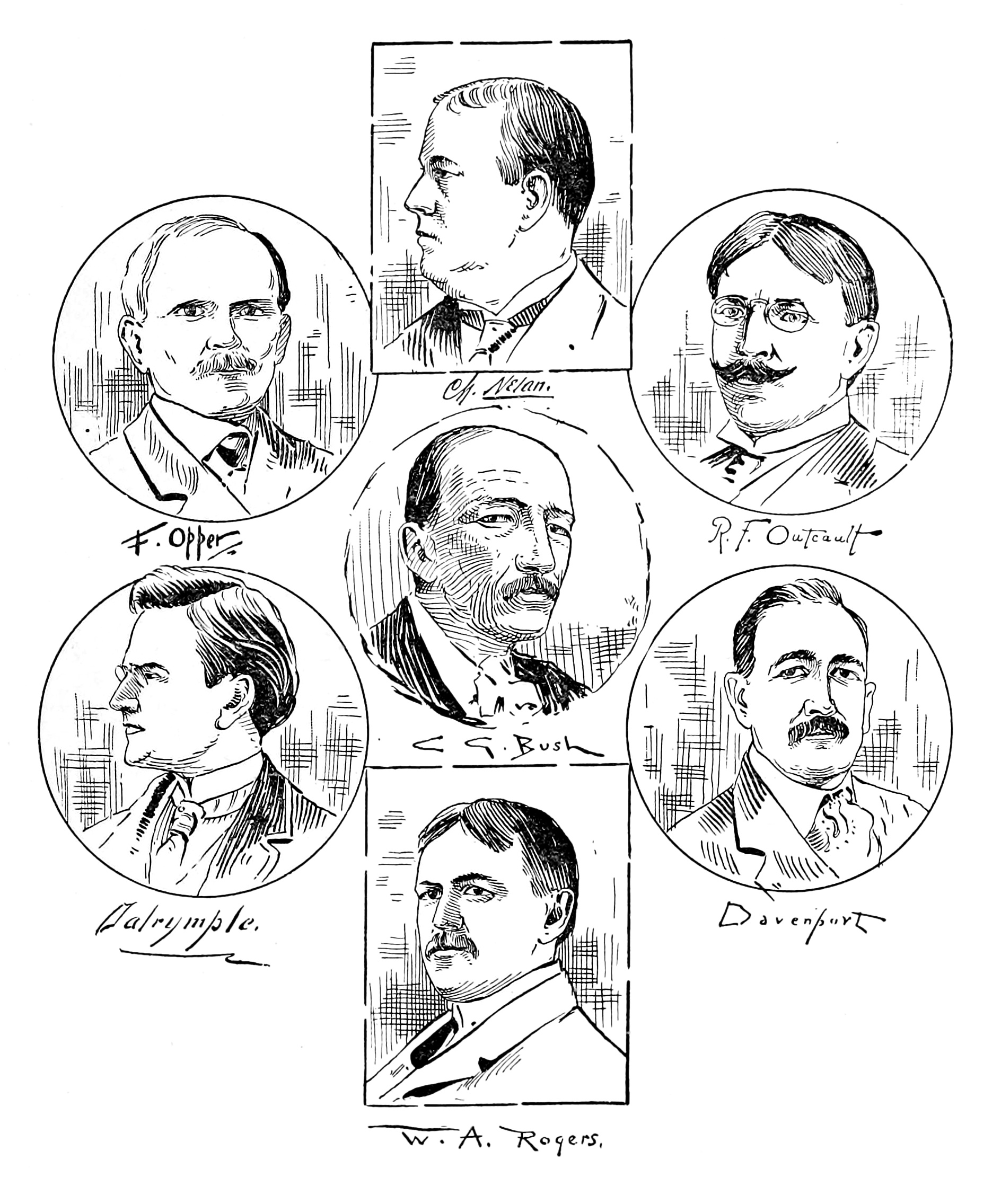
Some prominent cartoonists of the late 19th century: Charles Nelan, Frederick Opper, R. F. Outcault, C. G. Bush, Louis Dalrymple, Homer Davenport, and W. A. Rogers

This is a list of American comics creators. Although comics have different formats, this list covers creators of comic books, graphic novels and comic strips, along with early innovators. The list presents authors with the United States as their country of origin, although they may have published or now be resident in other countries. For other countries, see List of comic creators.

== A ==
- Jack Abel
- Jessica Abel
- Forrest J. Ackerman (Vampirella, editor and principal writer of the magazine Famous Monsters of Filmland)
- Art Adams
- Neal Adams (Deadman, worked on Batman)
- Scott Adams (Dilbert)
- Charles Addams (The Addams Family)
- Dan Adkins
- Gene Ahern (Our Boarding House, Room and Board, The Squirrel Cage, The Nut Bros.)
- Vince Alascia (worked for Timely Comics and Charlton Comics)
- F. O. Alexander (Hairbreadth Harry)
- Ashley Allen
- Mike Allred
- Bob Almond
- Bill Amend (FoxTrot)
- Brent Anderson
- Carl Thomas Anderson (Henry)
- Murphy Anderson
- Ross Andru (continued Wonder Woman and The Amazing Spider-Man, co-creator of the Metal Men)
- Jim Aparo (worked on Batman)
- Sergio Aragonés (Mad magazine, Groo the Wanderer)
- Robert Armstrong (Mickey Rat)
- Everett M. "Busy" Arnold (publisher for Quality Comics)
- Gus Arriola (Gordo)
- Ruth Atkinson (Millie the Model, Patsy Walker)
- Terry Austin
- Al Avison (continued Captain America)
- Vita Ayala
- Brian Azzarello

== B ==
- Derf Backderf (My Friend Dahmer)
- Mark Bagley
- George Baker (Sad Sack)
- Matt Baker (Phantom Lady)
- Carl Barks (Donald Duck, Scrooge McDuck)
- Donna Barr (Stinz, The Desert Peach)
- Lynda Barry (Ernie Pook's Comeek)
- Jen Bartel
- Richard Bassford
- Tom Batiuk (Funky Winkerbean, John Darling)
- Alison Bechdel (Dykes to Watch Out For)
- C. C. Beck (Captain Marvel)
- Gabrielle Bell
- Howard Bender
- Brian Michael Bendis
- Christian Beranek
- Dave Berg (The Lighter Side of...)
- Karen Berger (Vertigo)
- Walter Berndt (Smitty)
- D. Bruce Berry
- Jim Berry (Berry's World)
- Nick Bertozzi
- Gordon Bess (Redeye)
- Charles Biro (Steel Sterling, best known for work with publisher Lev Gleason)
- Wally Bishop (Muggs and Skeeter)
- Stephen R. Bissette
- Bud Blake (Tiger)
- Merrill Blosser (Freckles and His Friends)
- Vaughn Bodé (Cheech Wizard)
- Brett Booth
- Wayne Boring (continued Superman)
- Troy Boyle
- Martin Branner (Winnie Winkle, Perry and the Rinky-Dinks)
- Berkeley Breathed (Bloom County, Outland, Opus)
- T. Casey Brennan
- Norm Breyfogle
- E. Nelson Bridwell
- Clare Briggs (A. Piker Clerk)
- John Broome
- Jeffrey Brown (Clumsy, Unlikely, Incredible Change-Bots)
- Chris Browne (continued Hägar the Horrible)
- Dik Browne (Hi & Lois, Hägar the Horrible)
- Frank Brunner
- Rich Buckler (Deathlok)
- Bob Burden (Flaming Carrot)
- Carl Burgos (Human Torch)
- Cary Burkett
- Mildred Burleigh
- Charles Burns (El Borbah, Black Hole)
- John Buscema (Marvel Comics)
- Sal Buscema (worked on The Incredible Hulk)
- Ernie Bushmiller (Fritzi Ritz, Nancy)
- Kurt Busiek
- John Byrne (worked on X-Men, The Fantastic Four, The Man of Steel, The Sensational She-Hulk)
- Gene Byrnes (Reg'lar Fellers)

== C ==
- Dick Calkins (Buck Rogers)
- John Calnan
- Donald Clough Cameron
- Sophie Campbell (Wet Moon)
- Milton Caniff (Terry and the Pirates, Steve Canyon, Male Call)
- Max Cannon (Red Meat)
- Al Capp (Li'l Abner)
- Greg Capullo (Batman, Spawn)
- Nick Cardy (continued Aquaman and Teen Titans, co-creator of Bat Lash)
- Sergio Cariello
- Wallace Carlson (The Nebbs)
- Vic Carrabotta
- Ad Carter (Just Kids)
- Dick Cavalli (Morty Meekle, Winthrop)
- Louis Cazeneuve (continued Aquaman)
- Kody Chamberlain (30 Days of Night, Digital Webbing)
- Howard Chaykin (American Flagg!)
- Cliff Chiang (Paper Girls)
- Jack T. Chick (Chick tracts)
- Frank Cho (Liberty Meadows)
- Frank Cirocco
- Scott Clark (Martian Manhunter back-up in the 2013 Justice League of America series)
- Daniel Clowes (Eightball, Ghost World)
- Dave Cockrum (co-creator of the "new X-Men")
- Gene Colan (Daredevil, The Tomb of Dracula)
- Jack Cole (Plastic Man)
- Vince Colletta (inker noted for work on Jack Kirby's The Mighty Thor)
- Ernie Colón
- A.D. Condo (The Outbursts of Everett True; Mr. Skygack, from Mars)
- Darby Conley
- Gerry Conway
- Richard Corben (Den)
- Denys Cowan
- Johnny Craig (EC Comics, Mad magazine)
- Reed Crandall
- Roy Crane (Captain Easy, Wash Tubbs)
- Robert Crumb (Fritz the Cat, Mr. Natural, Keep on Truckin')
- Nick Cuti (E-Man, Moonchild, Captain Cosmos, Moonie)

== D ==
- Nicholas P. Dallis (Rex Morgan, M.D., Judge Parker, Apartment 3-G)
- Dame Darcy (Meatcake)
- Geof Darrow (Hard Boiled, Big Guy and Rusty the Boy Robot, Shaolin Cowboy)
- Peter David
- Jack Davis (Mad magazine)
- Jim Davis (Garfield)
- Chon Day (Brother Sebastian)
- Billy DeBeck (Barney Google and Snuffy Smith, Bunky)
- Dan DeCarlo (Archie Comics, Josie and the Pussycats)
- Kim Deitch (Waldo the Cat)
- J. M. DeMatteis
- Vince Deporter
- Stephen DeStefano
- Mike Diana (Boiled Angel)
- Tony DiGerolamo
- Dick Dillin (Justice League of America)
- Diane DiMassa (Hothead Paisan)
- Rudolph Dirks (born in Germany, later moved to the U.S.) (Katzenjammer Kids, later retitled The Captain and the Kids)
- Walt Disney (Disney comics)
- Steve Ditko (Spider-Man, Doctor Strange, Creeper, Hawk and Dove)
- Ed Dodd (Mark Trail)
- Don Dohler (ProJunior)
- Richard Dominguez
- Colleen Doran
- Tad Dorgan (For Better or Worse)
- Evan Dorkin
- Arnold Drake (Deadman, co-creator of The Guardians of the Galaxy and It Rhymes with Lust)
- Stan Drake (The Heart of Juliet Jones)
- Bill Draut
- Grace Drayton (Dolly Dimples)
- Debbie Drechsler (Daddy's Girl)
- Mike Dringenberg
- Mort Drucker (film and TV parodies in Mad magazine)
- Gaylord DuBois (Brothers of the Spear, longtime writer for Tarzan, Roy Rogers, Turok, Space Family Robinson)
- Randy DuBurke
- Edwina Dumm (Cap Stubbs and Tippie, Alec the Great)
- Clare Victor Dwiggins (School Days)

== E ==
- Kevin Eastman (co-creator of Teenage Mutant Ninja Turtles)
- Chondra Echert (The Armory Wars)
- Carl Ed (Harold Teen)
- Gus Edson (The Gumps, Dondi)
- Hy Eisman (continued Little Lulu, Popeye and The Katzenjammer Kids)
- Will Eisner (The Spirit, A Contract with God)
- Will Elder (Mad magazine, Panic, co-creator of Goodman Beaver and Little Annie Fanny)
- Grace Ellis
- Harlan Ellison
- Randy Emberlin
- Steve Englehart
- Rod Espinoza (Neotopia, The Courageous Princess)
- Mark Evanier
- George Evans
- Bill Everett (Namor the Sub-Mariner)

== F ==
- Al Fagaly (Super Duck, There Oughta Be a Law)
- Kevin Fagan (Drabble)
- Lee Falk (The Phantom, Mandrake the Magician)
- Jules Feiffer (Feiffer)
- Lyonel Feininger (The Kin-der-Kids, Wee Willie Winkie's World)
- Al Feldstein (EC Comics, Mad magazine)
- Charles Fincher (The Illustrated Daily Scribble, Thadeus & Weez)
- Lou Fine (co-creator of Black Condor)
- Bill Finger (Batman)
- Andy Fish (Adam Bomb)
- Bud Fisher (Mutt and Jeff)
- Dudley Fisher (Right Around Home)
- Hart D. Fisher (Jeffrey Dahmer: An Unauthorized Biography of a Serial Killer, publisher of Boneyard Press)
- Seth Fisher (artist best known for his work at Vertigo and Marvel Comics)
- James Montgomery Flagg (Nervy Nat)
- Anthony Flamini
- Mary Fleener
- Shary Flenniken (Trots and Bonnie)
- John Forte
- Brad W. Foster (Mechthings, co-creator of The Adventures of Olivia)
- Fontaine Fox (Toonerville Folks)
- Gardner Fox (longtime writer for Justice Society of America, Justice League of America)
- Steve Foxe
- Matt Fraction (The Invincible Iron Man, Sex Criminals)
- Frank Frazetta
- Chandra Free
- Ron Frenz
- Gary Friedrich
- Mike Friedrich
- Ralph Fuller

== G ==
- David Gallaher (Yours Truly, Johnny Dollar)
- Herb Gardner (The Nebbishes)
- George Gately (Heathcliff)
- Michael Gaydos
- Steve Gerber (Howard the Duck)
- Frank Giacoia (worked on Captain America)
- Joe Giella
- Keith Giffen
- Peter B. Gillis
- Phoebe Gloeckner (A Child's Life and Other Stories, The Diary of a Teenage Girl: An Account in Words and Pictures)
- Rube Goldberg (Boob McNutt, Mike and Ike (They Look Alike))
- Stan Goldberg
- Michael Golden
- Archie Goodwin
- Floyd Gottfredson (Mickey Mouse)
- Chester Gould (Dick Tracy)
- Billy Graham
- Brandon Graham (Prophet)
- Sam Grainger
- Vernon Grant (The Love Rangers)
- Harold Gray (Little Orphan Annie)
- Grass Green (Xal-Kor the Human Cat)
- Justin Green (Binky Brown)
- Sanford Greene (Bitter Root)
- Vernon Greene (The Shadow, continued Bringing Up Father)
- Roberta Gregory (Bitchy Bitch, Naughty Bits)
- Mike Grell
- Rick Griffin (Flying Eyeball)
- Bill Griffith (Zippy)
- Matt Groening (Life in Hell)
- Milt Gross (He Done Her Wrong, Count Screwloose)
- Rob Guillory (Mosely, Chew, Farmhand)
- Dick Guindon (The Carp Chronicles, Guindon)
- Cathy Guisewite (Cathy)
- Paul Gustavson (The Angel)

== H ==
- Harry Haenigsen (Penny)
- Jessica Hagy (Indexed)
- Larry Hama (G.I. Joe)
- V. T. Hamlin (Alley Oop)
- Cully Hamner
- Stuart Hample (Inside Woody Allen)
- Fletcher Hanks (Stardust, Fantomah, Big Red McLane, Space Smith)
- Kevin Konrad Hanna (creator of Clockwork Girl)
- Marc Hansen
- Fred Harman (Red Ryder)
- Jack C. Harris
- Tony Harris
- Sol Harrison
- Dean Haspiel
- Johnny Hart (B.C., The Wizard of Id)
- Al Hartley
- Jimmy Hatlo (They'll Do It Every Time, Little Iodine)
- Ethel Hays (Flapper Fanny Says)
- Russ Heath (war comics for EC Comics, Sgt. Rock, humor comics for Mad)
- Don Heck (co-creator of Iron Man, Black Widow)
- Erica Henderson
- Gilbert "Beto" Hernandez (co-creator of Love and Rockets)
- Jaime Hernandez (co-creator of Love and Rockets)
- Javier Hernandez (creator of El Muerto)
- Mario Hernandez (co-creator of Love and Rockets)
- George Herriman (Krazy Kat)
- Harry Hershfield (Abie the Agent)
- Sol Hess (writer of The Nebbs)
- Don Hillsman II
- Walter Hoban (Jerry on the Job)
- Rick Hoberg
- Bill Hoest (The Lockhorns)
- Syd Hoff (Tuffy, Laugh It Off)
- Burne Hogarth (continued Tarzan)
- Nicole Hollander (Sylvia)
- Bill Holman (Smokey Stover)
- Fran Hopper (Jane Martin, continued Patsy Walker)
- F. M. Howarth (The Love of Lulu and Leander, Ole Opey Dildock)
- Richard Howell
- Kin Hubbard (Abe Martin of Brown County)
- Reginald Hudlin
- James D. Hudnall
- Virginia Huget (continued Skippy)
- Steven Hughes (Lady Death, Evil Ernie)
- Tessa Hulls (Feeding Ghosts)
- Joye Hummel (scripted Wonder Woman)
- Sam Humphries

== I ==
- Jerry Iger (Sheena, Queen of the Jungle)
- Jamal Igle
- Carmine Infantino (DC Comics artist, later executive)
- Graham Ingels
- Tony Isabella

== J ==
- Al Jaffee (Mad Fold-in, Snappy Answers to Stupid Questions)
- Jimmy Janes
- Avy Jetter
- Geoff Johns
- Crockett Johnson (Barnaby)
- Jimmy Johnson (Arlo and Janis)
- Lynn Johnston (For Better or For Worse)
- Arvell Jones
- Bruce Jones
- Chuck Jones (Crawford)
- Jeffrey Catherine Jones
- Kelley Jones
- Russ Jones
- Tom Joyner
- Dan Jurgens
- Justiniano

== K ==
- C. W. Kahles (Haidbreadth Harry, Clarence the Cop)
- Michael Kaluta
- Jack Kamen
- Bob Kane (Batman)
- Gil Kane (continued Green Lantern, The Atom, The Amazing Spider-Man)
- George Kapitan (Black Widow, Archie, Human Torch, Air Man, Namor the Submariner)
- Bob Karp (wrote Donald Duck comics)
- Kaz (Kaz's Underworld)
- Bil Keane (The Family Circus)
- Jack Keller (Kid Colt)
- Dave Kellett (drive: the scifi comic, Sheldon)
- Collin Kelly
- Walt Kelly (Pogo)
- Jack Kent (King Aroo)
- Barbara Kesel
- Karl Kesel
- Hank Ketcham (Dennis the Menace)
- Sam Kieth
- Frank King (Gasoline Alley)
- Jack Kirby (Captain America, Spider-Man, The Incredible Hulk, Fantastic Four, X-Men, Sgt. Fury and his Howling Commandos, Iron Man, New Gods, Fourth World)
- Robert Kirby (Curbside)
- Robert Kirkman (The Walking Dead, Invincible)
- George Klein (Silver Age inker)
- Todd Klein
- Harold Knerr (continued The Katzenjammer Kids)
- James Kochalka (American Elf)
- Scott Kolins
- Aline Kominsky-Crumb (Dirty Laundry Comix)
- Wilhelm Heinrich Detlev Körner (Hugo Hercules)
- Bernard Krigstein (E.C. Comics, Master Race)
- Teddy Kristiansen
- Joe Kubert
- Charles Kuhn (Grandma)
- Harvey Kurtzman (Mad magazine, Goodman Beaver, Little Annie Fanny)
- Sam Kweskin

== L ==
- Peter Laird (co-creator of Teenage Mutant Ninja Turtles)
- Jackson Lanzing
- Erik Larsen
- Gary Larson (The Far Side)
- Rick Law
- David Lawrence
- John Layman
- Bob Layton
- Leon Lazarus
- Mell Lazarus (Momma)
- Mort Leav
- Jae Lee
- Jim Lee
- Stan Lee (writer of Spider-Man, The Incredible Hulk, X-Men, Silver Surfer, Fantastic Four)
- Lank Leonard (Mickey Finn)
- Bob LeRose
- Harris Levey, aka Lee Harris (DC Comics illustrator, creator of Air Wave)
- Paul Levitz
- George Lichty (Grin and Bear It)
- Larry Lieber (co-creator of Iron Man, Ant-Man, and Thor)
- Rob Liefeld (Deadpool)
- Mike Lilly
- Marty Links (Emmy Lou)
- Jason Little
- Marjorie Liu
- Vic Lockman (worked on Disney comics, made Christian comics)
- Bobby London (Dirty Duck, continued Popeye)
- Frank Lovece
- David Lynch (The Angriest Dog in the World)
- Jay Lynch (Nard 'n' Pat, Bijou Funnies)
- Stan Lynde (Rick O'Shay, Latigo)

== M ==
- David W. Mack (Kabuki, co-creator of Echo)
- Jeff MacNelly (Shoe)
- Matt Madden
- Gus Mager (Hawkshaw the Detective, Sherlocko the Monk)
- Elliot S. Maggin
- David Malki (Wondermark)
- Joe Maneely (The Black Knight, Yellow Claw, The Ringo Kid)
- Russ Manning (continued Tarzan)
- Bill Mantlo (Rocket Raccoon, Cloak and Dagger)
- Pablo Marcos
- Jerry Marcus (Trudy)
- Marge (Little Lulu)
- Jesse Marsh (continued Tarzan and John Carter of Mars)
- William Moulton Marston (Wonder Woman)
- Don Martin (Mad magazine, Captain Klutz, Fonebone)
- Edgar Martin (Boots and Her Buddies)
- Harry B. Martin (Weatherbird)
- Mark Martin
- S. Carlisle Martin (Weatherbird)
- Cal Massey (worked for Timely/Atlas Comics, St. John's Publishing)
- Fran Matera (continued Steve Roper and Mike Nomad)
- Joe Matt (Peepshow)
- Paul Mavrides (assisted on The Fabulous Furry Freak Brothers)
- Sheldon Mayer (Sugar & Spike)
- Val Mayerik (Howard the Duck)
- Clifford McBride (Napoleon and Uncle Elby)
- Winsor McCay (Little Nemo in Slumberland, Little Sammy Sneeze, Dream of the Rarebit Fiend, Hungry Henrietta)
- Scott McCloud (Zot!, Understanding Comics)
- Luke McDonnell
- Patrick McDonnell (Mutts)
- Walt McDougall (Queer Visitors from the Marvelous Land of Oz)
- Dwayne McDuffie (Rocket, Icon, Static, Hardware )
- J.P. McEvoy (Dixie Dugan)
- Don McGregor
- Aaron McGruder (The Boondocks)
- Roger Mckenzie
- Bob McLeod (co-creator of New Mutants)
- George McManus (Bringing Up Father)
- Shawn McManus
- Carla Speed McNeil (Finder)
- Nick Meglin (Mad magazine)
- Jack Mendelsohn (Jacky's Diary)
- Mort Meskin
- Otto Messmer (Felix the Cat)
- Bill Messner-Loebs (Journey: The Adventures of Wolverine MacAlistaire)
- Pop Mhan (Blank, co-creator of Spyboy)
- David Michelinie
- Mike Mignola (Rocket Raccoon, Hellboy)
- Al Milgrom
- Frank Miller (The Dark Knight Returns, Sin City, 300)
- Frank Miller (Barney Baxter in the Air)
- Wiley Miller (Non Sequitur)
- Tony Millionaire (Sock Monkey, Maakies)
- Tarpe Mills (Miss Fury)
- Takeshi Miyazawa
- Christopher Moeller
- Sheldon Moldoff
- Arthur R. "Pop" Momand (Keeping Up with the Joneses)
- Bob Montana (Archie Comics)
- Jim Mooney (Supergirl)
- Richard Moore (Far West, Boneyard)
- Terry Moore
- Dick Moores (continued Gasoline Alley)
- Rags Morales
- Pete Morisi
- Gray Morrow (Man-Thing, El Diablo)
- Wesley Morse (Bazooka Joe)
- Win Mortimer (worked on Ripley's Believe It or Not, Batman and Superman)
- Zack Mosley (The Adventures of Smilin' Jack)
- Dean Motter
- John Cullen Murphy (Big Ben Bolt, continued Prince Valiant)
- Joe Murray (Rocko's Modern Life)
- Paul Murry (worked on Disney comics)
- Joe Musial (continued The Katzenjammer Kids and Popeye)
- Russell Myers (Broom-Hilda)

== N ==
- Fred Neher (Life's Like That)
- Michael Netzer
- Josh Neufeld (A.D.: New Orleans After the Deluge, worked on American Splendor)
- Mark Newgarden
- Diane Noomin (Didi Glitz, editor of Twisted Sisters)
- Irv Novick

== O ==
- James O'Barr
- Rik Offenberger (G-Man Comics)
- Mike Okamoto
- Bob Oksner (various celebrity comics)
- Steve Oliff
- Dennis O'Neil
- Dan O'Neill (Air Pirates)
- Rose O'Neill (1909)
- Chris Onstad (Achewood)
- Frederick Burr Opper (Happy Hooligan, Alphonse and Gaston, And Her Name Was Maud)
- Jerry Ordway
- Joe Orlando (worked for Mad magazine, Creepy)
- Jackie Ormes (Torchy Brown, Patty-Jo 'n' Ginger)
- Dave Ortega
- John Ostrander
- Richard F. Outcault (The Yellow Kid, Buster Brown)
- Bruce Ozella (continued Popeye)

== P ==
- Nina Paley (Nina's Adventures, Fluff, The Hots)
- Tom Palmer
- Jimmy Palmiotti
- Gary Panter (Jimbo)
- Brant Parker (co-creator of The Wizard of Id)
- Virgil Partch (Big George, The Captain's Gig)
- Stephan Pastis (Pearls Before Swine)
- Chuck Patton
- C. M. Payne
- Bill Pearson (witzend, wrote and continued Popeye)
- Everett Peck (Duckman)
- Harvey Pekar (American Splendor)
- David Pepose
- George Pérez (New Teen Titans)
- Don Perlin
- Bill Perry (continued Gasoline Alley)
- Fred Perry (Gold Digger, Legacy)
- Harry G. Peter (Wonder Woman)
- Mike Peters (Mother Goose and Grimm)
- Irving Phillips (Scuffy, The Strange World of Mr. Mum)
- Stephanie Phillips
- Rina Piccolo (Tina's Groove)
- Wendy Pini (Elfquest)
- Dan Piraro (Bizarro)
- Ed Piskor (Wizzywig, Red Room, Hip Hop Family Tree)
- Al Plastino (worked on Superman, Batman, the Sunday pages of Nancy and continued Ferd'nand)
- Mike Ploog (Ghost Rider)
- Charles Plumb (Ella Cinders)
- Keith Pollard
- Paul Pope (THB, Battling Boy)
- Paul Peter Porges (born in Austria, later moved to the U.S.) (Mad magazine)
- Whilce Portacio
- Al Posen (Them Days Is Gone Forever, Sweeney & Son)
- Howard Post (The Dropouts)
- Greg Potter
- Carl Potts
- Hilary B. Price (Rhymes with Orange)
- Brian Pulido
- Howard Purcell
- Steve Purcell

== Q ==
- Joe Quesada (2000s editor-in-chief of Marvel Comics)

== R ==
- Janice Race
- Ted Rall (political-satirical comics)
- Albertine Randall (The Dumbunnies)
- Ron Randall
- Grace Randolph (Grace Randolph's Supurbia)
- Alex Raymond (Flash Gordon, Rip Kirby, Secret Agent X-9, Jungle Jim)
- Paul Reinman (inker for Jack Kirby)
- David Rees
- Ralph Reese
- Dianne Reum
- Robert L. Ripley (Ripley's Believe It or Not!)
- Gabby Rivera (America Chavez)
- Frank Robbins (Johnny Hazard, continued Scorchy Smith)
- Trina Robbins (Wimmen's Comix)
- Alex Robinson
- Jerry Robinson
- Spain Rodriguez (Trashman)
- Marshall Rogers
- Don Rosa (Donald Duck, Uncle Scrooge)
- Alex Ross
- Arnold Roth (Poor Arnold's Almanac)
- George Roussos, aka George Bell (Marvel Comics inker best known for early issues of Jack Kirby's The Fantastic Four)
- Leigh Rubin (Rubes)
- Greg Rucka (Whiteout)
- Christopher Rule
- Bruce Russell (Rollo Rollingstone)
- Clarence D. Russell (Pete the Tramp)
- P. Craig Russell
- Paul Ryan

== S ==
- Bud Sagendorf (continued Popeye)
- Harry Sahle (Black Widow, Fiery Mask, Human Torch, Archie, Candy)
- Stan Sakai
- Richard Sala (Peculia)
- Claudio Sanchez (writer of The Armory Wars)
- Darren Sanchez
- Jim Sasseville (worked on Peanuts, continued It's Only a Game)
- Allen Saunders
- Jim Scancarelli (continued Gasoline Alley)
- Jack Schiff
- Alex Schomburg
- Ariel Schrag (Adam: A Novel, Likewise, Potential)
- Mark Schultz (Xenozoic Tales)
- Carl E. Schultze (Foxy Grandpa)
- Charles M. Schulz (Peanuts, Li'l Folks, It's Only a Game)
- David Schwartz
- Julius Schwartz (editor for DC Comics often credited with launching the Silver Age of Comic Books)
- Dori Seda
- Tim Seeley (HACK/slash, Loaded Bible, Lovebunny & Mr. Hell)
- Elzie Segar (Thimble Theatre, Popeye, Sappo)
- Mike Sekowsky
- John Severin (Mad magazine, Cracked, Frontline Combat, Two-Fisted Tales, Sgt. Fury and his Howling Commandos, Two-Gun Kid)
- Marie Severin (EC Comics, Marvel Comics)
- Eric Shanower
- Gilbert Shelton (Fabulous Furry Freak Brothers)
- Jim Sherman
- Gary Shipman (Pakkins' Land)
- Rhoda Shipman (co-writer, Pakkins' Land)
- Jim Shooter (Marvel Comics editor-in-chief)
- Syd Shores (continued Captain America)
- Joe Shuster (Superman)
- Noel Sickles (Scorchy Smith)
- Jerry Siegel (Superman)
- Bill Sienkiewicz
- Marc Silvestri
- Joe Simon
- Gail Simone
- Louise Simonson
- Walt Simonson
- Joe Sinnott
- Stephen Slesinger (Red Ryder and King of the Royal Mounted)
- Roger Slifer
- Dan Slott
- Al Smith (continued Mutt and Jeff)
- Felipe Smith (MBQ, Ghost Rider, Peepo Choo)
- Jeff Smith (Bone)
- Mark Andrew Smith
- Paul Smith
- Sidney Smith (The Gumps)
- Mark Smylie (Artesia)
- Art Spiegelman (Maus, In the Shadow of No Towers)
- Dick Sprang (co-creator of the Riddler and long time Batman artist)
- Kyle Starks
- Jim Starlin
- Leonard Starr (Mary Perkins, On Stage, continued Little Orphan Annie)
- Richard Dean Starr
- Joe Staton (E-Man)
- Brian Stelfreeze
- Jim Steranko (Nick Fury)
- Roger Stern
- Chic Stone (Silver Age inker, best known for work with Jack Kirby)
- J. Michael Straczynski
- Jan Strnad
- Laurie S. Sutton
- Tom Sutton
- Curt Swan (continued Superman)
- Jimmy Swinnerton (The Little Bears, Mr. Jack, Little Jimmy)

== T ==
- Babs Tarr (Batgirl)
- John Tartaglione
- Frank Tashlin (Van Boring)
- Raina Telgemeier (Smile, Sisters)
- Hilda Terry (Teena)
- Bob Thaves (Frank and Ernest)
- Roy Thomas
- Bart Thompson
- Craig Thompson (Good-bye, Chunky Rice, Blankets, Carnet de Voyage, Habibi)
- Frank Thorne (Red Sonja)
- Bruce Tinsley (Mallard Fillmore)
- Tom Toles (Randolph Itch 2AM, Curious Avenue)
- Adrian Tomine (Optic Nerve)
- Tom Tomorrow (Tomorrow's World)
- Angelo Torres (film and TV parodies in Mad magazine)
- Alex Toth
- John Totleben
- Herb Trimpe (Wolverine)
- Corky Trinidad (Nguyen Charlie)
- Irving Tripp (worked on Little Lulu)
- Garry Trudeau (Doonesbury)
- Timothy Truman
- Warren Tufts (Casey Ruggles, Lance)
- Rick Tulka (Mad magazine)
- Morrie Turner (Wee Pals)
- George Tuska (Hercule, Scorchy Smith)
- Carol Tyler (Late Bloomer, You'll Never Know)

== V ==
- Andrew Vachss
- Jim Valentino
- Raeburn Van Buren (Abbie an' Slats)
- Ethan Van Sciver
- Jhonen Vasquez
- Brian K. Vaughan
- Rick Veitch
- Ivan Velez Jr.
- Gustave Verbeek
- Charles Vess
- Charles Voight

== W ==
- John Wagner
- Matt Wagner (Mage, Grendel)
- Mark Waid
- David F. Walker (Naomi McDuffie)
- Mort Walker (Beetle Bailey, Hi & Lois (writer), Boner's Ark)
- Reed Waller ("Omaha" the Cat Dancer)
- Chris Ware (The Acme Novelty Library, Jimmy Corrigan)
- Adam Warren
- Bill Watterson (Calvin and Hobbes)
- Gerard Way
- H. T. Webster (Caspar Milquetoast)
- Len Wein (Swamp Thing, Wolverine, X-Men, Human Target, Justice League)
- Mort Weisinger (Silver Age editor of Superman)
- Alan Weiss
- Morris Weiss (scripted Joe Palooka, continued Mickey Finn)
- Larry Welz (Cherry)
- Russ Westover (Tillie the Toiler)
- Ed Wheelan (Minute Movies)
- Mack White
- Ogden Whitney (Herbie Popnecker)
- George Wildman (continued Popeye)
- Signe Wilkinson
- Frank Willard (Moon Mullins)
- Erin Williams
- Al Williamson
- Skip Williamson (Snappy Sammy Smoot)
- Bill Willingham
- Mary Wilshire
- George Wilson
- Ron Wilson
- Ronald Wimberly (Prince of Cats)
- Doc Winner (Tubby, continued Popeye, Katzenjammer Kids)
- Al Wiseman (continued Dennis the Menace)
- Elmer Woggon (Steve Roper and Mike Nomad)
- Marv Wolfman
- Wally Wood (EC Comics, Mad magazine)
- Jim Woodring (Frank)
- Joshua Workman
- Gregory Wright
- Bernie Wrightson (Bernie Wrightson's Frankenstein, House of Mystery, House of Secrets, Swamp Thing)
- George Wunder (continued Terry and the Pirates)

== Y ==
- Gene Luen Yang
- Chic Young (Blondie)
- Lyman Young (Tim Tyler's Luck)
- Tommy Yune (Buster the Amazing Bear, writer/artist of Speed Racer)

== Z ==
- Bela Zaboly (continued Popeye)

== See also ==
- List of newspaper comic strips
