= Far West =

Far West may refer to:

== Places ==
- Western Canada, or the West
  - British Columbia Coast
- Western United States, or Far West
  - West Coast of the United States
- American frontier, or Far West, Old West, or Wild West
- Far West (Taixi), a term used in East Asia that refers to Europe
- Far West, Missouri
- Far West, Austin, Texas
- Far West (New South Wales)
  - Unincorporated Far West Area
- Far-Western Development Region, Nepal
- The Palatine Barony of the Far West, a branch of the Society for Creative Anachronism, encompassing East Asia and the Pacific
- al-Maghrib al-ʾAqṣā (the Farthest West)

=== See also ===
- Farr West, Utah

== In transportation ==
- Farwest Airlines (airline code: FRW), a short-lived airline owned by Max and Thelma Biegert that operated in 1994 out of Fresno, California
- Far West (River Steamboat), a steamsboat on the Missouri River and the Yellowstone River in the 1870s and '80s, sometimes associated with the Battle of the Little Bighorn

== In media ==
- Far West (comics), a comic book by Richard Moore
- Far West (video game) is a German computer game released on May 2, 2002, created by Greenwood Entertainment and edited by JoWooD Productions
- Far West (film), a 1973 Belgian film
- Far West (role-playing game), a 1993 Spanish role-playing game published by M+D Editores
- FAR-West (music conference), Folk Alliance Region West

== Other ==
- Far West Theatres, a former movie theater chain in Los Angeles, California
- Far West United, Nepalese cricket team
