= George Roussos =

American comic book artist

- Roussos at his drawing board in 1941
- Born: August 20, 1915 Washington, D.C., U.S.
- Died: February 19, 2000 (aged 84) Bay Shore, New York, U.S.
- Areas: Inker, Colourist
- Pseudonym: George Bell

George Roussos (/ˈruːsoʊs/; August 20, 1915 – February 19, 2000), also known under the pseudonym George Bell, was an American comic book artist best known as one of Jack Kirby's Silver Age inkers, including on landmark early issues of Marvel Comics' Fantastic Four. Over five decades, he created artwork for numerous publishers, including EC Comics, and he was a staff colorist for Marvel Comics.

== Biography ==
=== Early life and career ===
George Roussos was born in Washington, D.C., the son of Greek-Americans William and Helen Roussos. After he and his sisters Helen and Alice were orphaned as children, George was sent to live at the Brooklyn Orphan Asylum in New York City, and attended Public School 125 in the Woodside neighborhood of Queens. Roussos was influenced by the art of cartoonist Frank Miller in the aviation comic strip Barney Baxter in the Air. Other influences included Chester Gould, Stan Kaye, Robert Fawcett and Hal Foster. "I had no schooling [in art] except the things I learned by myself," Roussos said.

=== Comic books and comic strips ===
Roussos entered comics in 1939 as letterer of the Spanish-language version of the newspaper panel Ripley's Believe It or Not, despite not being able to read Spanish.

The following year, Bob Kane and Bill Finger hired him to assist inker Jerry Robinson on Batman stories. Roussos' duties included drawing backgrounds, inking, and lettering, starting as early as Batman #2 (Summer 1940). At the same time, he did similar duties on Target and the Targeteers. He and Robinson would eventually leave the Kane studio to work directly for National Comics (the future DC Comics) on Batman and other characters. Roussos worked on features starring the Vigilante, Johnny Quick, Superman, and Starman. His most notable DC work was as penciller, inker, colorist, and letterer of the Detective Comics backup feature "Air Wave", on which he experimented, on at least one story, with using only shades of gray for color. He also was the co-creator, along with Jerry Siegel, of Superwoman (the character first appeared in "Lois Lane -- Superwoman", Action Comics #60).

Other companies for which Roussos drew during the 1940s Golden Age of comic books included Marvel-precursor Timely Comics, as well as Avon Publications, Standard/Better/Nedor, Family, Fiction House, Hillman Periodicals, Lev Gleason Publications, and Spark. He also did 16 internationally distributed educational pamphlets for General Electric, receiving a World War II draft deferment to do so. The survey "The 20 Greatest Inkers of American Comic Books" placed Roussos at #15, saying he "was so adept with a brush in his hand that his co-workers appointed the nickname 'Inky' to him. His style was often thick, heavy with blacks, and sported nice contrasts which complimented [sic] one of his prime collaborators in the '50s, Mort Meskin."

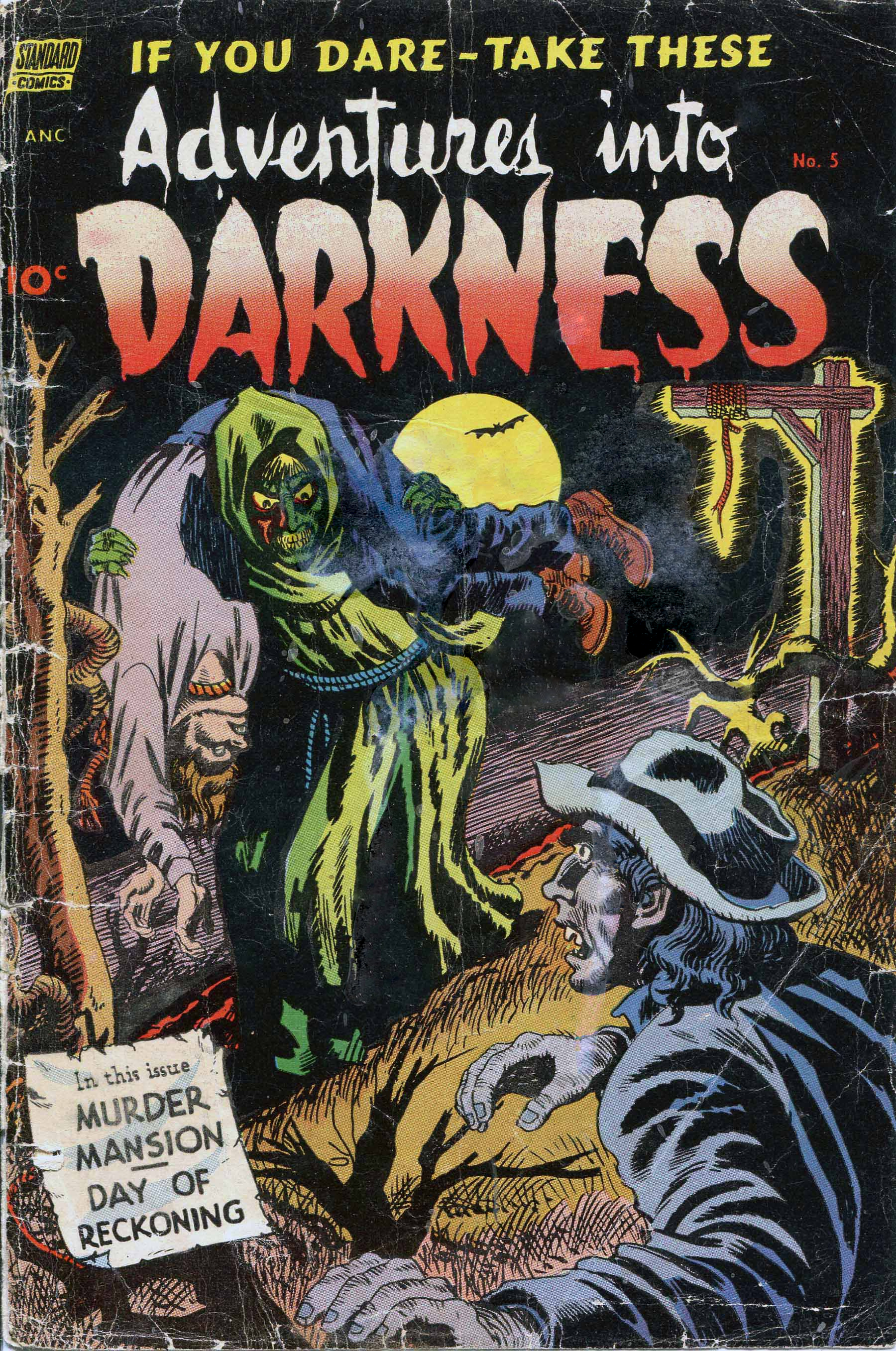
Nedor Comics' Adventures Into Darkness #5, cover art by Roussos

After a brief attempt to open an art school with colleague Mort Meskin, Roussos added comic strips to his repertoire, assisting artist Dan Barry's Flash Gordon, Charles Flanders' The Lone Ranger, Dan Heilman's Judge Parker and Sy Barry's The Phantom, and succeeding Fred Kida as artist on Judge Wright from 1947 until the strip's demise the following year. Roussos unsuccessfully pitched syndication companies his own comic strips, such as the science fiction feature 2001 A.D. in 1945, the archeology strip Azeena in 1967, and Transisto, with Batman creator Bill Finger, in the late 1960s.

Comic-book clients during the 1950s included that decade's Marvel precursor, Atlas Comics, along with Crestwood, EC Comics and St. John Publications. For EC he did stories in Crime SuspenStories, Tales from the Crypt, Weird Science and Weird Fantasy.

=== Silver Age Marvel ===
One of comics' most famous covers: The Avengers #4 (March 1964), penciled by Jack Kirby and inked by Roussos.

In the 1960s, during the period fans and historians call the Silver Age of Comic Books, Roussos gained prominence under the pseudonym "George Bell" when he became Jack Kirby's inker on landmark early issues of Marvel Comics' superhero team title Fantastic Four. These included #21–27 (Dec. 1963 – June 1964), which featured the first Hulk vs. Thing battle. As well, Roussos had inked the Kirby covers of issues #11, 13, and 18–20. Roussos also inked the return of Captain America in The Avengers #4 (March 1964) — the cover of which has become one of comics' most famous — as well as Kirby's Sgt. Fury and his Howling Commandos #3–7 (Sept. 1963 – March 1964). In addition, though Marvel Comics did not credit colorists at this time, Roussos later claimed that he always colored any comic that he inked.

=== Later life and career ===
After doing some work for Warren Publishing's black-and-white horror-comics magazines in 1970 and 1971, Roussos in 1972 succeeded Marie Severin as Marvel's full-time, in-house colorist. In the early 1980s, Roussos was Marvel's cover colorist.

Roussos was a Renaissance man whose myriad interests included architecture, astronomy, automobiles, gardening, natural medicine, philosophy and photography. He took photographs of various Long Island estates, and his photographs at the Bayard Cutting Arboretum State Park were collected in his book, The Bayard Cutting Arboretum History.

Roussos died of a heart attack. He was married twice: to Viola Fink, followed by Florence Lacey (married 17 November 1980, died 1998). Roussos had three sons (William, Robert and Louis) and a daughter (Marie).

== Books by Roussos ==
- Roussos, George. The Bayard Cutting Arboretum History: A History and Description of William Bayard Cutting and His Country House, Westbrook, Great River, L.I. Oakdale, New York: The Board of Trustees and the Long Island State Park and Recreation Commission, 1984.
