= Charles Bush =

Charles Bush may refer to:

- Charles G. Bush (1842–1909), American cartoonist
- Charles P. Bush (1809–1857), politician from the U.S. state of Michigan
- Charles V. Bush (1939–2012), first African-American page of the Supreme Court of the United States
- Charles W. Bush (1881–1955), mayor of Anchorage, Alaska
- Charles William Bush (1919–1989), Australian painter

== See also ==
- Charles F. Brush (1849–1929), American engineer, inventor, entrepreneur, and philanthropist
