= Sasseville (surname) =

Sasseville is a surname. Notable people with the surname include:

- Jake Sasseville (born 1985), American television personality
- Jim Sasseville (1927–2005), American cartoonist and graphic artist
- Lorna Sasseville (born 1960), Canadian former cross-country skier
- Marc H. Sasseville (born 1963), United States Air Force officer
