= Peepo Choo =

Japanese manga series

- First tankōbon volume cover

ピポチュー (Pipo Chū)
- Manga
- Written by: Felipe Smith
- Published by: Kodansha
- English publisher: NA: Vertical
- Magazine: Monthly Morning Two
- Original run: June 21, 2008 – February 22, 2010
- Volumes: 3
- icon

Peepo Choo (Japanese: ピポチュー, Hepburn: Pipo Chū) is a Japanese manga series written and illustrated by Felipe Smith. It was serialized in Kodansha's manga magazine Monthly Morning Two from June 21, 2008. The individual chapters were collected into three tankōbon volumes by Kodansha, released between April 24, 2009, and April 23, 2010. It is licensed in North America by Vertical, which released the three volumes between July 13, 2010, and December 14, 2010.

== Synopsis ==
Milton, who lives in downtown Chicago, is a hardcore otaku. He admires Japan for producing his favorite manga. One day, Milton wins a chance to go to his dreamland Japan. Former prisoner, Gill, is now a comic shop owner with an attitude. Morimoto "Rockstar" is a young, up-and-coming yakuza in Japan and he is addicted to American TV dramas.

== Development ==
First English volume cover, published by Vertical on July 13, 2010

Felipe Smith was given 2 days to submit 40 thumbnails of Peepo Choo by his current editor, Yukari Shiina. Smith drew the first 35 thumbnails and then drew the last five thumbnails in front of the editor in the last 24 hours without sleep. The editor accepted Smith's thumbnails. Smith stated he wanted to show the collision of American and Japanese cultures through his work, which is exemplified on the cover of the first Japanese volume where "the girl is flipping you off, and she's got American flag and a Japanese flag ring on either side of her middle finger". He uses the sex scenes and violence for character development to prevent his characters from being "two-dimensional". The characters' loneliness stems from the crowded city of Tokyo and the "need to keep your personal space", which results in "a lot of melancholy". Smith summarizes the issues addressed by the manga as "dealing with pop culture, and the general culture of the two countries and the characteristics of different age groups in those countries".

Smith comments on his output for Peepo Choo, with "In the time I put out one volume of MBQ, I've put out one and three-quarter volumes of Peepo Choo." Jason Thompson commented on the difficulty of translating the "numerous half-Japanese, half-English lines".

== Reception ==
Charles Webb from MangaLife comments on the graphic nature of the manga, citing "explicit sex and incredibly detailed violence". A review of the second volume has Webb criticizing on the "Miike-meets-Pokémon" aspect of the story. Mania.com's Matthew Warner commends Smith for "[picking] on the misconceptions that early Western otaku often fall prey to, but those of the East as well". Warner's review of the second volume applauds the book "that can have you laughing out loud at something outlandish one moment, then shock or even disgust you with its vivid depravity the next, and yet it never feels disjointed in the least". Warner criticizes the final volume of the manga for its character match-ups that "feel a bit flat". Katherine Dacey criticizes the satire stating that it is "seldom generous or polite, but it shouldn't be punitive, either, and that’s Peepo Choo's greatest shortcoming". Shaenon K. Garrity commends the "amazing, bizarre art" and the "hilarious, fearless look at otaku culture" but criticizes it for being "utterly tasteless". Joseph Luster, writing for Otaku USA, commends Smith's subjects for being "equal parts grotesque, erotic and adorable". Luster's review of the second volume commends Smith's artwork, stating "His art continues to infuse Spümcø expressions and animated movement with a more traditional manga style, just short of including his very own version of the "gross-up close-up"". Luster further commends the characters for being "much more than the stereotypes to which they cling". Ed Sizemore criticizes Smith's writing for "[having] all the subtlety of a brick to the face", comparing it to South Park and Family Guy. Sizemore further pans the manga with "there is simply too much going on. Smith has a strong central message in the manga that gets lost in the pandemonium of sex, extreme violence, and zany humor". ICv2's Steve Bennett states "Milton is naturally everyone's favorite pinata but no one escapes being pilloried; Smith seems to have equal contempt for the fans of both manga and superhero comics". Anime News Network's Lissa Pattillo commends the manga its "great cultural commentary showing the same story played out through very different eyes and circumstances; an in-your-face charisma that's never short of memorable and an overall package that definitely qualifies as unique" but criticizes it for the "different elements of story don't mesh well together and as a result the switching back and forth between leaves them both feeling neglected in the end; sheer amounts of sex and violence can be too over the top". Carlo Santos criticizes Smith for getting "maybe a bit too sentimental and nerdvangelical in the finale".
