= Darren Sanchez =

- Areas: Writer, Artist, Publisher
- Notable works: After Hours Press

Darren Sanchez is a comic book creator. He is the production director at Starlight Runner Entertainment. He is also the publisher of After Hours Press, with partner Buddy Scalera. Sanchez has created and written such titles as Impossible Tales, Foxwood Falcons, J.A.A.T., and Genie the Genius, which was co-created with former NFL quarterback Boomer Esiason. Sanchez has optioned several of his titles (Celestial Alliance & Foxwood Falcons) for films and currently develops new stories and intellectual properties for clients at After Hours Press, and at Marvel Comics.

== Biography ==
Sanchez served in the United States Army as a pilot and warrant officer, flying attack helicopters in the 1980s and early 1990s. In an interview with the comic book website Project Fanboy, Sanchez attributes his service as an Army officer as the reason he is in the position he holds today (in the comic book industry).

Sanchez has worked professionally in the comic book industry since 1991. He began his career with Valiant Comics, as production manager, where he also earned writing credits on the Armorines yearbook, Magnus 2001, and an unpublished issue of Archer & Armstrong.

His first independent comic, Celestial Alliance, was published in 2000 through After Hours Press, the company he, Buddy Scalera, and Chris Eliopoulos started. In December 2007, he was named Vice President of Production at Wizard Entertainment.

After Wizard, Sanchez worked for Starlight Runner Entertainment with CEO and transmedia guru Jeff Gomez, as well as with former Valiant Editor-in-Chief Fabian Nicieza. Projects there included transmedia consulting for clients such as Sony Pictures, Activision, James Cameron, Coca-Cola, Disney, and Pepperidge Farms.

Sanchez currently works as Editor and Manager of Custom Solutions at Marvel Comics.
