= NBM Publishing =

American graphic novel publisher

- Status: Active
- Founded: 1976; 50 years ago as Flying Buttress Publications; 1984; 42 years ago as NBM
- Founders: Terry Nantier; Chris Beall; Marc Minoustchine
- Headquarters location: New York City, U.S.
- Distribution: Independent Publishers Group (US); Turnaround Publisher Services (UK); Diamond Book Distributors (international)
- Publication types: Graphic novels; Comic books and magazines
- Imprints: ComicsLit; Eurotica; Amerotica; Flying Buttress Classics Library
- Official website: nbmpub.com

Nantier Beall Minoustchine Publishing Inc. (or NBM Publishing) is an American graphic novel publisher. Founded by Terry Nantier in 1976 as Flying Buttress Publications, NBM is one of the oldest graphic novel publishers in North America. The company publishes English adaptations and translations of popular European comics, compilations of classic comic strips, and original fiction and nonfiction graphic novels. In addition to NBM Graphic Novels, the company has several imprints including ComicsLit for literary graphic fiction, and Eurotica and Amerotica for adult comics.

According to NBM, it is "the second largest indie comics press after Fantagraphics with close to $3MM in yearly retail sales on over 200,000 graphic novels sold a year plus tens of thousands of comic books and magazines". The company says their "editorial choices [...] take [their] cue from the large and well-respected European comics scene".

== History ==
=== Flying Buttress Publications ===
Terry Nantier (born 1957) spent his teenage years living in Paris, developing an interest in European comics. Returning to the U.S., Nantier attended the Newhouse School of Communications division of Syracuse University. In 1976, while still a Newhouse student, and using his Lawrinson Hall dorm room as headquarters, he teamed with Chris Beall and Marc Minoustchine to found Flying Buttress Publications with an initial investment of $2,100. (Their tagline, referencing the architectural element of the flying buttress, was "the support of a new medium.")

Flying Buttress was among the first to introduce the concept of the European graphic novel to American audiences. Among their first titles was Racket Rumba (1977), a 50-page spoof of the noir-detective genre, written and drawn by the French artist Loro. The company followed this with Enki Bilal's The Call of the Stars (1978). In 1979, the company published Gene Day's Future Day, a collection of science fiction works reprinted from comics anthologies including Star*Reach. Flying Buttress marketed these works as "graphic albums".

In 1982, the company created the Flying Buttress Classics Library imprint to reprint classic newspaper comic strips in both hardcover and paperback, beginning with Milton Caniff's Terry and the Pirates, followed by Tarzan strips by Hal Foster and Burne Hogarth.

=== NBM Publishing ===
Nantier moved to New York City in 1983 to study at New York University, where he received his MBA in marketing in 1985. At that point NBM incorporated as Nantier, Beall, Minoustchine (NBM Publishing). Nantier was co-owner and publisher, a title he still holds.

NBM found success with such series as Vicente Segrelles's The Mercenary and Hugo Pratt's Corto Maltese. NBM also became known for its reprints of classic newspaper comic strips. Wash Tubbs and Captain Easy reprinted the entire 1924–43 run of Roy Crane’s strip in an 18-volume series with biographical and historical commentary by Bill Blackbeard. With production and design by Bhob Stewart, this series was published by NBM on a quarterly schedule from 1987 to 1992.

In 1991, NBM created the Eurotica erotic comics imprint, following that in 1995 with the Amerotica line. Leading off the Amerotica titles were Skin Tight Orbit, volumes 1 and 2, erotic science fiction anthologies written by Elaine Lee. In 1994, NBM created ComicsLit, its showcase literary imprint, which introduced ComicsLit Magazine in 1995. Rick Geary's long-running "Murder" series, A Treasury of Victorian Murder and A Treasury of XXth Century Murder, have both been published through ComicsLit.

All through the 1990s NBM published translations of Franco-Belgian comics as well as works by Geary, Ted Rall, and other American authors.

It was not until 1997 that NBM published their first actual comic books—in a magazine format—when they reprinted issues of Pratt's Corto Maltese in a seven-issue limited series.

In 2005, Nantier founded the companion publisher Papercutz, which is devoted to family-friendly comic books and graphic novels. Mad Cave Studios acquired Papercutz in 2022.

In 2020 NBM began publishing a new American translation of the Asterix series.

== Distribution ==
Early on, NBM was distributed to the direct market through outfits like Sea Gate Distributors, Bud Plant Inc., Last Gasp, and Krupp Comic Works. NBM pioneered general bookstore distribution as early as 1980, with Caroline House. In 1986, it was the first American comics publisher to get a book distributor when it signed with Publishers Group West. In 1988, NBM took over its own distribution, along the way becoming Dark Horse Comics's graphic novels distributor. In 1994, they officially joined the Association of Comic Store Suppliers.

== Selected titles ==
- Attitude: The New Subversive Cartoonists series and other works by Ted Rall (3 vols.)
- Les Aventures extraordinaires d'Adèle Blanc-Sec, five volumes translated into English (1990–92)
- Boneyard by Richard Moore
- Bayba by Roberto Baldazzini
- Cities of the Fantastic by François Schuiten and Benoît Peeters
- Click and other works by Milo Manara
- Corto Maltese by Hugo Pratt (seven issues; 1997–98)
- Cryptozoo Crew (optioned for a film in 2008)
- Dungeon and other works by Lewis Trondheim
- Fantastic Art and other books of illustration by Luis Royo
- The Forever War, by Marvano
- Guardians of the Louvre by Jiro Taniguchi
- A Jew in Communist Prague, by Vittorio Giardino
- Lone Sloane, by Philippe Druillet
- Rohan au Louvre by Hirohiko Araki
- Sizzle — erotic comics magazine (includes new Omaha the Cat Dancer)
- Skin Tight Orbit — erotic science fiction by Elaine Lee, with Michael Kaluta, Phil Winslade, Will Simpson, Ray Lago, Jim Sherman, and others (2 vols.)
- The Story of Lee, manga by Sean Michael Wilson and Chie Kutsuwada
- A Treasury of Victorian Murder, by Rick Geary
  - Jack the Ripper (1995)
  - The Borden Tragedy (1997)
  - The Fatal Bullet (1999)
  - The Mystery of Mary Rogers (2001)
  - The Beast of Chicago (2003)
  - The Murder of Abraham Lincoln (2005)
  - The Case of Madeleine Smith (2006)
  - The Saga of the Bloody Benders (2007)
- A Treasury of XXth Century Murder, by Rick Geary
  - The Lindbergh Child (2008)
  - Famous Players (2009)
  - The Terrible Axe-Man of New Orleans (2010)
  - The Lives of Sacco and Vanzetti (2011)
  - Lovers' Lane: The Hall-Mills Mystery (2012)
  - Madison Square Tragedy: The Murder of Stanford White (2013)
- Wake, by Jean-David Morvan and Philippe Buchet
