= It's Only a Game (comic strip) =

American comic strip by Charles Schulz

- Front cover of the 2004 It's Only a Game book, collecting the complete run of the comic strip
- Author: Charles M. Schulz
- Current status/schedule: Concluded four-days-a-week comic strip
- Launch date: November 3, 1957
- End date: January 11, 1959
- Syndicate(s): United Feature Syndicate
- Genre(s): Humor, Sports

It's Only a Game was a sports-and-game-oriented comics panel by Charles M. Schulz, creator of Peanuts. This panel feature ran for 14 months, from November 3, 1957, to January 11, 1959. It's Only a Game was distributed by United Feature Syndicate.

Schulz and cartoonist Jim Sasseville (who also assisted Schulz on Peanuts stories for various comic books) produced this strip which appeared in newspapers four times a week, including Sundays. Schulz created the strip and produced the first few weeks worth of strips himself; after that, while Schulz was responsible for most of the written content and rough artwork, Sasseville was brought on board to provide some of the gags and all the finished artwork, done in Schulz's style (Schulz continued to receive sole credit for the comic).

Despite the resemblance to the children in Peanuts, most of the characters in these cartoons were adults. The comic focused on games, which could range from card games and board games to classic "sporting" games, or even recreational activities. Unlike most other sports comics, the sporting activities focused on many amateur sports, like golf and ping pong.

The strip was modestly successful, although its unusual three-times-a-week publication schedule (Monday, Wednesday and Friday) may have limited its placement in many newspapers. A Sunday strip was also offered to newspapers, consisting of the three panels from earlier in the week, along with a bonus fourth panel in an elongated format.

Given the growing popularity of Peanuts (along with his work on Young Pillars) and the resulting demands on his time, Schulz canceled the strip after 63 weeks.
