= Rik Offenberger =

American comic book journalist, publicity agent, and author

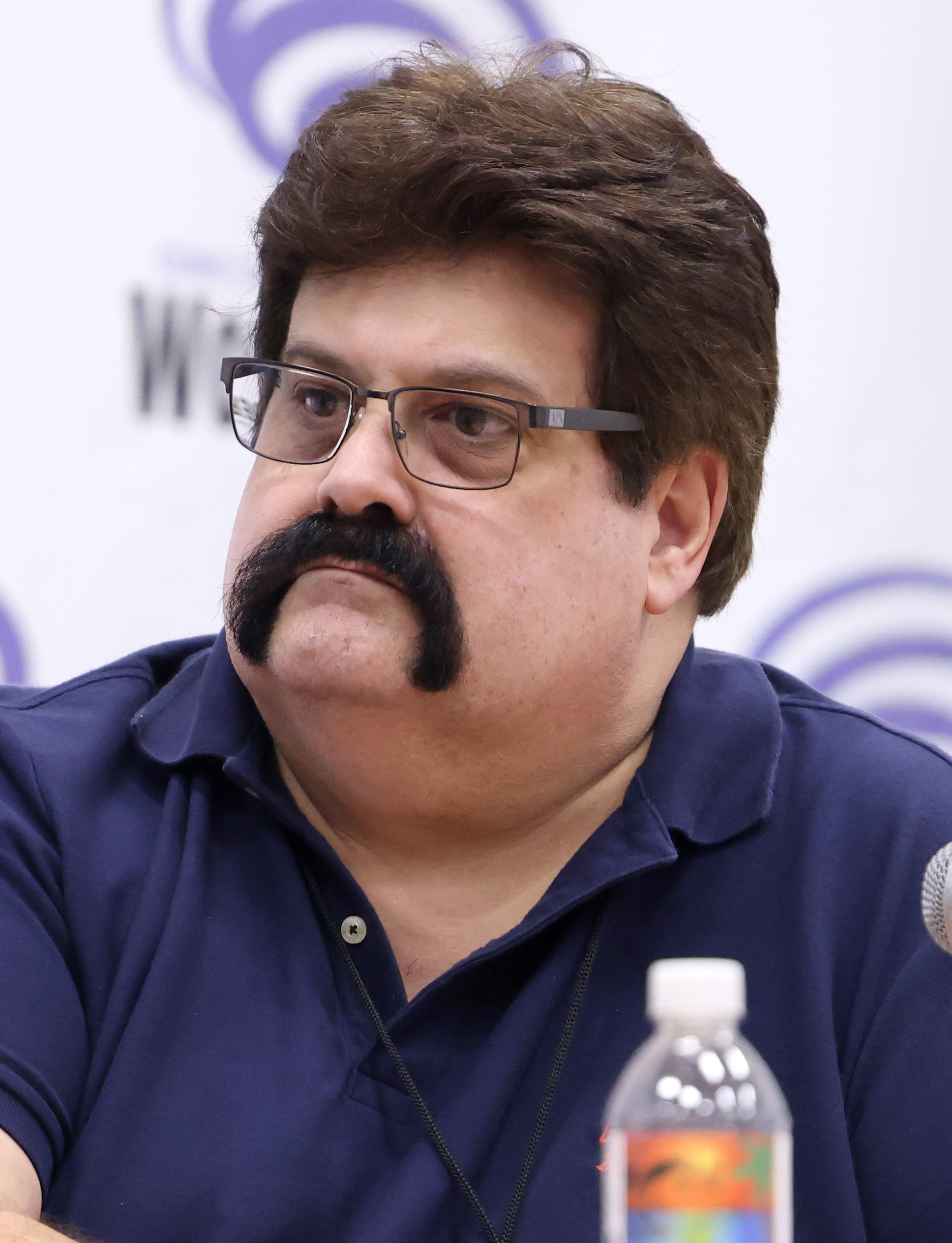
- Offenberger in 2025
- Born: January 30, 1964 (age 62) Norwalk, California
- Area: Editor
- Notable works: Archie Comics Public Relations Coordinator
- Awards: Inkwell Awards Above & Beyond Award 2023

Rik Offenberger (born January 30, 1964) is an American comic book journalist and publicity agent, an early utilizer of the Internet for distributing comics news, and the public relations coordinator of Archie Comics.

== Career ==
Offenberger started his career in comics as a retailer at Paper Hero Comics in Chino, California. He began writing for the Comics Buyer's Guide in March 1992, where he covered stories about retailers to help promote the comics shop. Following work on the Comics Buyer's Guide, he began working for the British Borderline Comics Magazine until it was discontinued. This was followed by a move to the Internet, where he worked as an interviewer and senior feature editor at Silver Bullet Comic Books (now Comics Bulletin), conducting interviews with comics professionals. In 2004 he began producing trend-oriented interviews for Newsarama and by 2005 he was writing for both Newsarama and Comic Book Resources.

In December 2005, Offenberger succeeded Alex Segura as Public Relations Coordinator of Archie Comics.

Since 2012, Offenberger has been on the Nominating Committee of the Inkwell Awards.

In 2022, Offenberger was a judge for the Will Eisner Comic Industry Awards

In 2023, he was awarded the Inkwell Awards Above & Beyond Award for his ten years on its nomination committee.

== Super Hero News ==
In October 1998, Offenberger founded Super Hero News, an Internet-based comics-news service utilizing the Yahoo! List server. While the service primarily distributes affiliate press releases, it's also been used as a vehicle for debate and contention by some of its members.

== First Comics News ==
In April, 2010, Offenberger, Phil Latter and Ric Croxton founded First Comics News, a web-based division of Super Hero News, covering comics, gaming, wrestling and related pop-culture topics. The name is derived from one of the early independent comics publishers of the 1980s, First Comics. The site logo was also fashioned after the publisher's imprint trademark. The site carries comics news, publisher solicitations, opinion columns, interviews, podcasts and reviews. Contributors include Beau Smith, Bob Almond, Holly Golightly, Ian Flynn, Michael Netzer, Mark Heike and cosplay actress Tanya Tate. The site maintains offices in Canada and Europe.

In January, 2011, First Comics News announced the winners of its first annual First Place Awards. First Comics News itself was a 2012 Eagle Award nominee.

== G-Man Comics ==
G-Man Comics, established June 22, 2019, is a guild style publisher featuring characters created by Rik Offenberger, Jim Burrows, and Eric N. Bennett, among others. Although each creator owns exclusive rights to their creation, they occupy a shared universe. The comic features traditional style superheroes.
