= Far West (comics) =

Comic book series

Publication information
- Publisher: Antarctic Press
- Schedule: monthly
- Format: standard
- Genre: Fantasy Western
- Publication date: Nov. 1998 – May 1999; Feb. 2000–Apr. 2000; 2008
- No. of issues: (1998–1999) 4 (2000) 2 (2008) 1
- Main character(s): Ra'Meghan Val'Norium (Meg); Phil

Creative team
- Created by: Richard Moore

Collected editions
- Far West: ISBN 978-1561632978
- Far West Pocket Manga Vol. 1: ISBN 978-0980125542

Far West is a comic book limited series created by Richard Moore and published by Antarctic Press. The setting is an industrial age Western-style secondary world full of creatures such as elves, dwarfs, centaurs and other fantasy creatures.

== Plot ==
Meg, a half-elf gunslinger, works alongside her partner Phil, a talking grizzly bear. As bounty hunters, they are hired to capture an outlaw who uses a fire-breathing dragon to rob trains. They later come into conflict with a gang of ogres led by the notorious Moonshine Kid. In their latest adventure, they pursue a fugitive into the haunted Badlands and have to fight against an evil spirit called Kodiki who can transform himself into the physical manifestations of their worst fears.

== Publication history ==
The Far West storyline consisted of four issues published in Nov. 1998 – May 1999; a second volume consisting of two issues, published in Feb.–Apr. 2000; and a full-color one-shot published in 2008.

=== Collected editions ===
- Far West (NBM Publishing, 2001) ISBN 978-1561632978 — includes "Dragon Train" parts 1–4, "Hole in the Head Gang" parts 1 and 2, and a bonus story — "Pookah Party"
- Far West Pocket Manga Vol. 1 (Antarctic Press, 2008) ISBN 978-0980125542
- Far West: Badder Mojo (Antarctic Press, 2009) — includes "Bad Mojo" and "Badder Mojo". It was the first book of the series to be published in color.

== Cast ==
=== Main characters ===
- Ra'Meghan Val'Norium – Half-elf half-Native American gunfighter who usually wears a breech cloth, assless chaps, and a bowler hat. Tiny but curvaceous, Meg has long, dark hair, which she sometimes wears in braids, and bifurcate pointed ears. Her most prominent facial feature is her large nose, which in no way detracts from her beauty. Other distinguishing physical features include cheetah-like spots on her wrists, shins, the small of her back, and her pubic area. Meg is tough, foul-mouthed, and short-tempered, but has a good heart and is loyal to her sidekick and the memory of her beloved father.
- Phil – A large talking grizzly bear, Meg's sidekick who is a crackshot with a winchester rifle. Unlike the wild Meg who loves gambling, getting drunk and starting fights, Phil is more calm and restrained.

=== Villains ===
- Darian Voss – Elf train-robber who lives in Troll country and is recognisable for his muttonchop sideburns and handlebar moustache.
- Moonshine Kid – A bandit trapped in a child's body after drinking the elixir of life.
  - Hole-in-the Head Gang – The Kid's dim-witted ogre henchmen
- High-Top – A snake oil salesman who tries to kill Meg after losing a game of poker. Meg kills him by poisoning his beer with a flesh-eating water demon.
- Bellboy – A lecherous dwarf bribed by High-Top to put a water demon in Meg's bath.
- Phooka – A goat-faced goblin capable of changing his shape.
- Sheetfire – A goblin who sold the dragon to Darian Voss.

=== Others ===
- Senerick Val'Norium - Meg's late father, an elf and a farmer whose untimely death set the course for Meg's adult life. She misses him terribly and keeps a locket with a tintype of the two of them inside it.
- Cyrus Shaldak – A detective who leads the Blackhawk Posse.
- Blackhawk Posse – A rival gang of bounty hunters who take the credit by bringing in Voss's body.
- Blind Man – An insane hermit who tries to warn Meg about the dragons
- Trolls – The equivalent of cowboys who wrangle fire-breathing dragons.
