= Felipe Smith =

American comic book writer

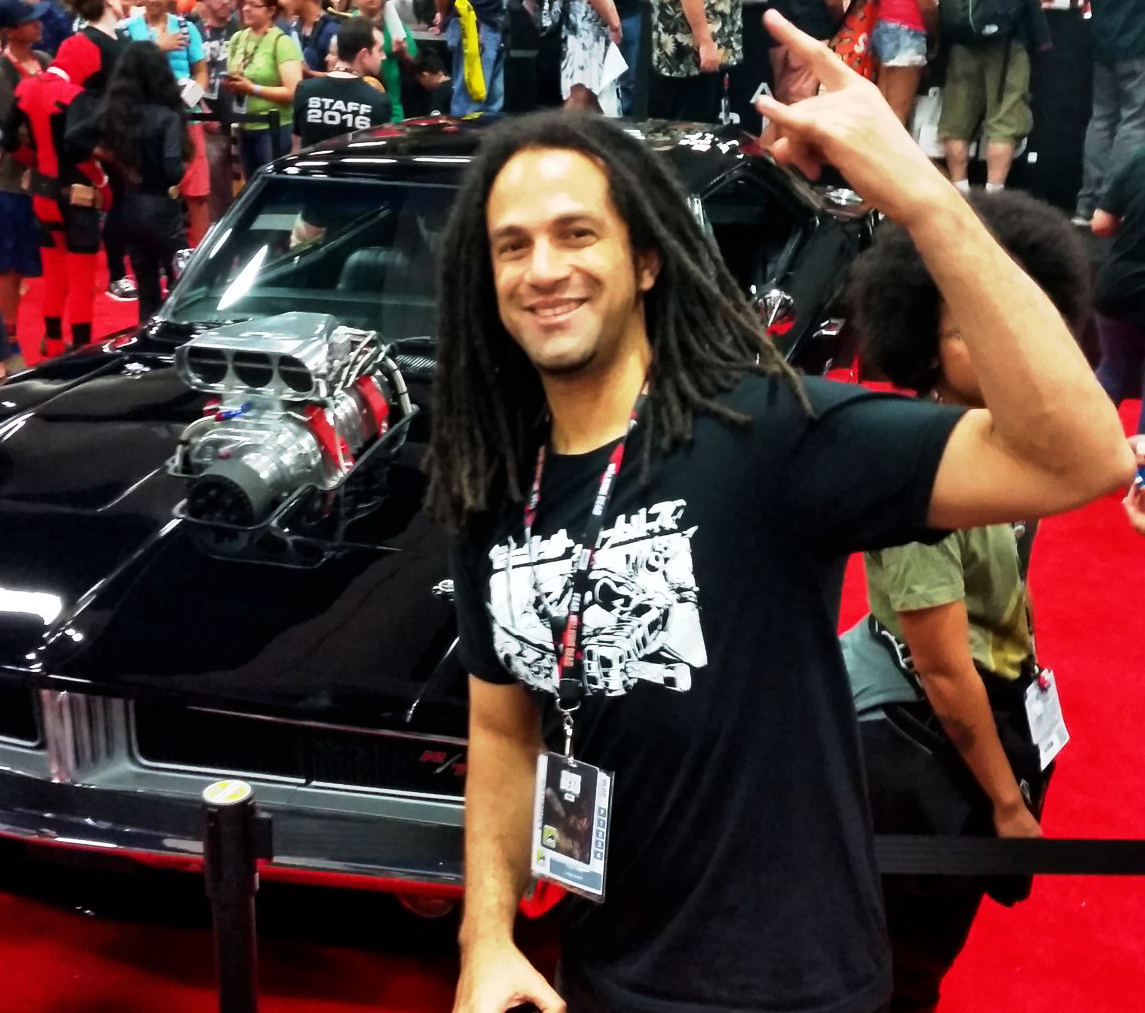
- Smith at San Diego Comic-Con in July 2016
- Born: 1978 (age 47–48); Akron, Ohio, U.S.
- Education: School of the Art Institute of Chicago
- Occupations: Writer; Artist
- Writing career
- Language: English, Spanish, Japanese
- Period: 2005–present
- Notable works: MBQ; Peepo Choo; All-New Ghost Rider
- Website: felipesmith.com

Felipe Smith (born 1978) is an American comic book writer and artist of Jamaican and Argentine descent. He is the creator, co-designer, and writer of Robbie Reyes Ghost Rider, and the author of Peepo Choo, a manga series debuting in 2008 in Kodansha's Morning Two monthly magazine. It was one of the first manga titles created and serialized in Japan by a Western creator before being licensed for an English-language release.

== Early life and education ==
Smith was born on June 17, 1978 to a Jamaican father and Argentine mother. When Smith was five years old, he moved with his family to Buenos Aires, Argentina, where he studied at an international school, Asociación Escuelas Lincoln. Smith's artistic ambitions were sparked at an early age; as he grew up, he became known for his talent in art, and the attention surrounding his work motivated him to keep it up. Smith's parents never bought him comic books as a child, so Smith started reading comics pretty late around the age of 13, with one of them being Ghost Rider, and the ones he enjoyed the most were the more darker and violent comic books. In high school, Smith experimented with his own comic book, The LPL Brothers, which was about goblins in a low rider, which he sold to his classmates for 1 peso each. As Smith completed high school in Buenos Aires, he decided to have art be the focus of his professional life, and he returned to the U.S. for college, he had initially considered to get a career in painting, but while attending the School of the Art Institute of Chicago, he was exposed to several different art styles and forms of visual animation, which he was amazed by. After graduating from the School of the Art Institute of Chicago, (SAIC), with a Bachelor of Fine Arts in 2000. Initially aspiring to be an animator and work in animation full time, Smith moved to Los Angeles to pursue a career in animation, via airplane.

== Post-college struggles & career ==
Smith began his career in comics in 2005 and was living in Los Angeles when he wrote and drew his first three-volume graphic novel series, the semi-autobiographical MBQ. As the buzz about his series reached Japan, he was contacted by a prominent book agent who was interested in representing him in that country. Together they organized a meeting at San Diego Comic-Con in 2007 with an editor in chief from Kodansha, the largest Japanese publishing company at the time. As a result, in 2008 Smith moved to Tokyo, Japan to publish his second three-volume graphic novel series, Peepo Choo, one of the first manga titles created by a non-Japanese native and initially serialized by Kodansha for a Japanese audience before it was later released in English by Vertical Inc. Smith worked four years in the Japanese market; when he returned to L.A. in 2012, he joined Nickelodeon's Teenage Mutant Ninja Turtles animated TV series, first as a storyboard artist and then as a full-time character designer. In 2014 Marvel Comics announced Smith as the writer of monthly All-New Ghost Rider and creator of its protagonist, Robbie Reyes. From the start, Smith was given complete freedom to create the character's personality and background and the setting in which events in the series take place; he also sketched the preliminary visual designs. Smith's co-creation for Marvel crossed over from publishing to television in 2016, when Robbie Reyes made his first appearance in Agents of S.H.I.E.L.D..
