= Richard Moore (comics) =

- Born: Fredrick William Morehead; July 17, 1966 (age 60) French Camp, California
- Areas: Cartoonist, Artist
- Notable works: Far West; Boneyard; Deja Vu

Richard Moore (born July 17, 1966, in French Camp, California as Fredrick William Morehead) is an American writer and artist of comic books. His published titles include Far West (Antarctic Press), Boneyard (NBM Publishing) and Deja Vu (Radio Comix).

== Biography ==
=== Overview ===
Moore's first original work was Far West, a four-issue limited series published in 1998–1999 by Antarctic Press. A sequel to Far West was published in 2008.

Moore published Boneyard, a quarterly fantasy humor title, from 2001 through 2009 with NBM Publishing. Boneyard won the 2005 gold medal for all-ages graphic novels from ForeWord Magazine.

Some of Moore's adult-only work includes one-shot titles from different publishers such as Genus and Milk!. Moore also contributed to the first issue of the gay title Genus Male.

Other works by Moore include Fire and Brimstone, Chip and Chip: Second Crack.

== Awards ==
- 1999 Winner, National Cartoonists Society Awards — Television Animation Division
- 2005 Gold Medal, All-ages Graphic Novels, from ForeWord Magazine — Boneyard

== Bibliography ==
- Ninja High School #64 (Antarctic Press, Aug. 1998) — Far West preview
- Far West:
  - Vol. 1, 4 issues (Antarctic Press, Nov. 1998–May 1999)
  - Vol. 2, 2 issues (Antarctic Press, Feb. 2000–Apr. 2000)
  - one-shot (Antarctic Press, 2008)
- Deja Vu:
  - Deja Vu vol. 1 (Radio Comix, Nov. 2000–Jan. 2001)
  - Deja Vu: The Pond one-shot (Radio Comix, Mar. 2001)
- Boneyard - 28 issues (NBM Publishing, 2001–2009)
  - Hog's Breath Inn — webcomic spinoff of Boneyard
- The Pound one-shot (Radio Comix, 2000)
- Fire and Brimstone, 5 issues (Antarctic Press, June 2008–Feb. 2009)
- Insane Children's Letters to God (CreateSpace, 2009) ISBN 978-1441490148
- Chip:
  - Vol. 1, 2 issues (Antarctic Press, March 2010–May 2010)
  - Chip: Second Crack, 3 issues (Antarctic Press, Sept. 2010 - 2011)

=== Erotic comics ===
- Genus various issues (Radio Comix, 2000–)
- Horny Tails (NBM Publishing/Amerotica, 2001)
- Poundcake (Radio Comix, 2004)
- Short Strokes, 2 issues (NBM, 2005)
- Richard Moore's Blue Grind one-shot (Antarctic Press, 2006)
- Milk! (Radio Comix)
- A-Bomb (Antarctic Press)
- Genus Male (Radio Comix)
- Sizzle, various issues (NBM Publishing) — includes characters from Moore's various series
