= Mildred Burleigh =

American cartoonist

Mildred Burleigh (January 1887 – August 9, 1956) was an American professional artist and a cartoonist for the Chicago Tribune during the 1920s. Born in Indiana, she studied drawing at Michigan Normal College and worked as a drawing instructor in Oregon during the 1910s before beginning her career.

== Career ==
Burleigh was working as a professional cartoonist by 1921, when her cartoon, Pigtails, appeared in the Chicago Tribune. This comic strip ran until 1923. According to comic historian Allan Holtz, Pigtails focused on daily experiences of young girls, including family life, chores, and childhood aspirations. Her focus on girlhood distinguished her from her colleagues, such as Clare Briggs and John T. McCutcheon, who developed their comics from a masculine point-of-view. After Pigtails ended in 1923, she created the series Kitty and Her Family. Kitty was mentioned by name in advertisements for the Chicago Tribune's Sunday subscriptions, ending with the tagline "Fun for everyone--man, woman, or child."

Little is known about Burleigh's career after 1924, but she appears in the 1930 and 1940 censuses in New York City, working as a "freelance artist" and later as a "freelance advertising cartoonist." During this period, she likely created an undated lithograph, "Clown," which resides in the Martin W. Brown Collection at the University of Maryland Art Gallery. This collection, acquired by the gallery in 1955, includes prints by a number of twentieth-century American Regionalist artists, such as John Steuart Curry. Like Curry, Burleigh's work speaks to small-town American life before, during, and after the Great Depression.

She died in Manhattan in 1956.

== See also ==
- Female comics creators
- Portrayal of women in American comics
