= G-Man Comics =

US micropublisher

- Founded: June 22, 2019
- Founder: Rik Offenberger, Jim Burrows & Eric N. Bennett
- Country of origin: United States
- Headquarters location: Chino, California
- Distribution: Ka-Blam, Philbo Distribution
- Key people: Rik Offenberger, Jim Burrows, Eric N. Bennett, Gilbert Monsanto
- Publication types: Comic books, graphic novels
- Fiction genres: Superhero
- No. of employees: 92
- Official website: Official website

G-Man Comics is a micro-publisher. It began on June 22, 2019 with the publication of the first comic book handbook in September 2019.

G-Man Comics is a guild-style publisher featuring Rik Offenberger's Simon N. Kirby: the Agent, Sgt. Flag, Lynx, and "Fruit Fly"; Jim Burrows' Demon Priest, and Invictus; and Eric N. Bennett's First Guard, and Taranis. Although each creator owns exclusive rights to their creation, they occupy a shared universe. In 2026, G-Man Comics partnered with Philbo Publishing for a full national comic shop distribution.

== Titles ==
- Black Phantom (Steve Perrin, Ronn Foss, John Jennings, Jim Burrows, Mell Ford, David Elis Leary) - ongoing
- Demon Priest Ashcan (Jim Burrows, Gilbert Monsanto) - (March 2020)
- Endless Summer (Alan Faria, Bobby Ragland, Brad Matthews, Dean Juliett, Fish Lee, Gilbert Monsanto, Jake Isenberg, Joshua 1:9 Holley, Samir Simão, Stefani Rennee, Téo Pinheiro) - (August 2024)
- First Guard (Eric N. Bennett, Gilbert Monsanto, Luis Rivera, Fernando Damasio, Ron Williams) - ongoing
- G-Man Comics 2in1 (Rik Offenberger, Eric N. Bennett, Bobby Ragland, Téo Pinheiro) - (November 2024)
- G-Man Comics 3in1 (Rik Offenberger, Jim Burrows, Eric N. Bennett, Gilbert Monsanto, Alan Faria, Steven Butler, Michael Netzer, Bill Black, Eric Coile, Justin Vargas, Thomas Florimonte, Hique!, Téo Pinheiro) - ongoing
- Global G-Men (Gilbert Monsanto, Eric N. Bennett) - ongoing
- G-Man Comics Christmas Special (Rik Offenberger, Steven Butler, Arnaldo dos Santos Ferreira Júnior, Joshua 1:9 Holley, Dean Juliette, Gilbert Monsanto, Bobby Ragland) - (December 2021 & December 2022)
- G-Man Comics Handbook (Rik Offenberger, Jim Burrows, Eric N. Bennett, Joe Sewell, Gilbert Monsanto, Phil Cho, Alan Faria) - ongoing
- G-Men Undercover (Alan Faria, Arnaldo dos Santos Ferreira Júnior, Bill Black, Dærick Gröss Sr., Dean Juliette, Eric Coile, Fish Lee, Gilbert Monsanto, Joshua 1:9 Holley, Luis Rivera, Mike Gustovich, Rob Liefeld, Ron Frenz, Steven Butler) - ongoing
- G-Men United (Rik Offenberger, Jim Burrows, Eric N. Bennett, Gilbert Monsanto, Bobby Ragland, David Ellis Leary, Earl Wajenberg, Fish Lee, Joshua 1:9 Holley, Lou Mougin, Luis Rivera, Steven Butler, Thomas Florimonte) - ongoing
- Heidi The Valyrie/Dara, Warrior Goddess (John P. Araujo, Eric N. Bennett, Gilbert Monsanto) - (2026)
- Highlight (Gilbert Monsanto, Eric N. Bennett) - ongoing
- Invictus: Outrage (Jim Burrows, Gilbert Monsanto, Arnaldo dos Santos Ferreira Júnior, Mel Ford, Steven Butler, Joshua 1:9 Holley) - ongoing
- Judah Maccabee (Rik Offenberger, ismail c. fentner, Gilbert Monsanto, Steven Butler) - (November 2021)
- Lynx (Rik Offenberger, Milton Estevam, Joshua 1:9 Holley, Mike Cody, Steven Butler, Mario Gully, Eric Shanower) - ongoing
- Macho Comics (Rik Offenberger, Bobby Ragland, Téo Pinheiro, Fernando Menezes, Stefani Rennee) - ongoing
- Sgt. Flag (Rik Offenberger, Gilbert Monsanto, Gregg Whitmore, Bobby Ragland, Luis Rivera, Joshua 1:9 Holley, Steven Butler, Mike Gustovich, Rob Liefeld) - ongoing
- Simon N. Kirby, The Agent (Rik Offenberger, Gilbert Monsanto, Alan Faria, Steven Butler, Mort Todd, Dærick Gröss Sr., Thomas Florimonte, Pat Broderick, Joshua 1:9 Holley) - ongoing
- Taranis, The Thunderlord (Eric N. Bennett, Arnaldo dos Santos Ferreira Júnior, Fernando Damasio, Ron Frenz, Joshua 1:9 Holley, Luis Rivera, Federico Pepito Sioc Jr., Ron Charles Williams, Andy Smith, Steven Butler) - ongoing
- Total Eclipse (Steve Perrin, Ronn Foss, Jim Burrows) - April 2023

== Characters ==
- Agent Squires
- Alpha
- American Eagle III
- Atomik Bombshell
- Belenos
- Belisama
- Bella Donna
- Bette Noir
- Bette Noir (The Original)
- Blue Bolt
- Boden
- Borrum
- Captain Battle
- Cat•Man & Kitten
- Champion of Liberty²
- Dagda
- Dan Hagen
- Dara
- Demon Priest
- Doc Ovalle
- Doctor Tomorrow
- Druil
- Energist & Irene
- Fire Trolls
- G-Men (Team)
- Gods of Avalorr
- Gray Hornet
- Joe Dragon
- Judah "The Hammer" Maccabee
- Kid Terror
- Lynx
- Maiden America
- Manotaur
- Mummy Girl
- Pocahontas
- Red Halo
- Sgt. Flag
- Simon N. Kirby: The Agent
- Simone Lefort
- Sister Flag
- Tai-Chi Dragon
- Taranis
- Terror Noir
- Terror Twins
- True Blue & Richard, The True Knight
- Vencejo y Pollita
- White Terror
- Zima
