= Avy Jetter =

American cartoonist

- Born: December 11, 1968 (age 57)

Avy Jetter (born December 11, 1968) is an American writer, artist, and activist who is best known for her self-published comic series Nuthin' Good Ever Happens at 4 a.m. Jetter also works as a Special Programs & International Affiliates Coordinator at University of California, Berkeley.

== Career ==
Jetter began her postsecondary education at the California College of Arts, but after a short time transferred to Fisk University in Nashville, Tennessee. After two semesters, Jetter returned to CCA where she completed her Bachelor of Fine Arts in painting in 1994. Jetter began her comic career in early 2012 as a response to seeing her friend's webcomic. Her artistic creativity was inspired by the comics her four older brothers created when she was a child, as well as Mildred D. Tayler, Walter Dean Myers, and Morrie Turner. Currently, Jetter is independently published because she enjoys the creative freedom producing work outside of the traditional publishing realm allows and prioritizes the face to face experience of meeting those that support her comics and zines.

=== Comics ===
Jetter began work on her self-published comic series, Nuthin' Good Ever Happens at 4 a.m., in early 2012. The comic follows the lives of four friends, Chan, Dee Jay, Dray, and Zee, throughout a zombie apocalypse that breaks out in Oakland, California. Determined to present it at the San Francisco Zine Fest, she finished the first issue of the series in under five months. The series is categorized by its horror and gore, and the majority of it is stylized in black and white. Jetter exclusively uses people of color as her characters. Nuthin' Good Ever Happens at 4 a.m. is currently in production of its fifth issue.

In 2015, Jetter wrote and illustrated a submission titled "Pull It Up From the Roots" for APB: Artists Against Police Brutality: A Comic Book Anthology. The anthology focuses on police brutality, the justice system, and civil rights. All of the proceeds are donated to the Innocence Project.

In September 2017, it was announced that Jetter had been chosen to take part in a ten-issue production of the supernatural horror comic Box of Bones. The comic follows the life of an African American graduate student who is taken on a journey through the most violent times in African history by a mysterious box.

Jetter also provided illustrations for Johary Ravelson's story “Water in the Rice Fields Up to My Knees," which will be featured in Sunspot Jungle: The Ever Expanding Universe of Fantasy and Science Fiction. The anthology of science fiction stories will be released in January 2019.

In addition to her published comics, Jetter also creates zines about her life as an African American woman. She shifts her focus from fantasy to non-fiction storytelling as she depicts a large range of topics including racism and the personal politics of Black hair. She continues to be an active member in the West Coast zine community.

=== Portraits ===
Trained in traditional mediums at CCA, Jetter creates and sells hand-drawn portraits. Some of her portrait subjects include Barack Obama, Martin Luther King Jr., and variant comic sketch covers of characters from The Walking Dead.

== Activism ==
Jetter's artistry frequently incorporates themes of social injustice, micro-aggressions, and Black History. She has repeatedly discussed what it means to be an ally in social movements. She uses zines as a medium to express the impact of the racism and disenfranchisement of people of color and the rise of racial tension in her community. Jetter further supports marginalized populations by curating art shows that center around artists from underrepresented communities. The University of California, Davis has hosted her as a guest speaker to discuss the importance of decolonizing comics.

== Personal life ==
Jetter currently lives in Oakland, CA.
