= Erin Williams =

American author, illustrator, cartoonist

- Occupations: Illustrator; Cartoonist; Writer
- Writing career
- Genre: Graphic narrative

Erin Williams is an American author, illustrator, cartoonist, and researcher. The author and illustrator of Commute: An Illustrated Memoir of Female Shame, and What's Wrong: Personal Histories of Chronic Pain and Bad Medicine, her graphic narratives cover chronic pain and illness, alcoholism, sexual assault, motherhood, and gender.

== Career ==
In 2019, Williams' graphic memoir, Commute: An Illustrated Memoir of Female Shame, was published by Abrams Comic Art, an imprint of Abrams Books. Williams illustrates the everyday details of her morning routine, such as putting on makeup, making tea, and waiting at the train station while simultaneously addressing how her identity as a woman intersect both the commute and her past trauma. The memoir also documents her struggle with alcoholism and sexual assaults, illustrating how trauma becomes shame through the narrative of a single day's commute to and from work. The Kenyon Review described Commute's publication as speaking to the "massive cultural shift in the wake of #MeToo, as women continue to share stories that for so long went unspoken."

Williams' book What's Wrong: Personal Histories of Chronic Pain and Bad Medicine is a collection of illustrated personal histories of chronic illness and pain. In it, she details the conditions of four people from diverse backgrounds, as well as her own chronic illness, illustrating how individuals experiencing chronic pain and chronic illness struggle to navigate the medical system.

She also wrote and illustrated the Big Activity Book series with Jordan Reid. These books include The Big Activity Book for Anxious People, The Big Fat Activity Book for Pregnant People, The Big Activity Book for Divorced People, and The Big Activity Book for Digital Detox, all published by Penguin RandomHouse.

== Awards ==
Book Riot, The A.V. Club, and The Strand named Commute a Best Book of 2019. It was long-listed for the 2019 Believer Book Award for Nonfiction.

In October 2023, Williams was the recipient of a Koyama Provides grant for her comics work.

== Selected works ==
- What's Wrong? Personal Histories of Chronic Pain and Bad Medicine, 2024, published by Abrams Comics Art
- How to take care, with Kate Novotny, 2022, published by Penguin RandomHouse
- Our Whispering Wombs, illustrations, 2022, published in the Virginia Quarterly Review
- "Plague as Disciplinary Project: COVID in Chicago", 2021, published in Synapsis
- "Love Sick: An artist researches one form of illness in the time of another", 2020, published in the MoMA magazine
- "Dust and Doubt", 2020, published in The Believer
- Commute: An Illustrated Memoir of Female Shame, 2019, published by Abrams Comics Art
