= Harris Levey =

Artist

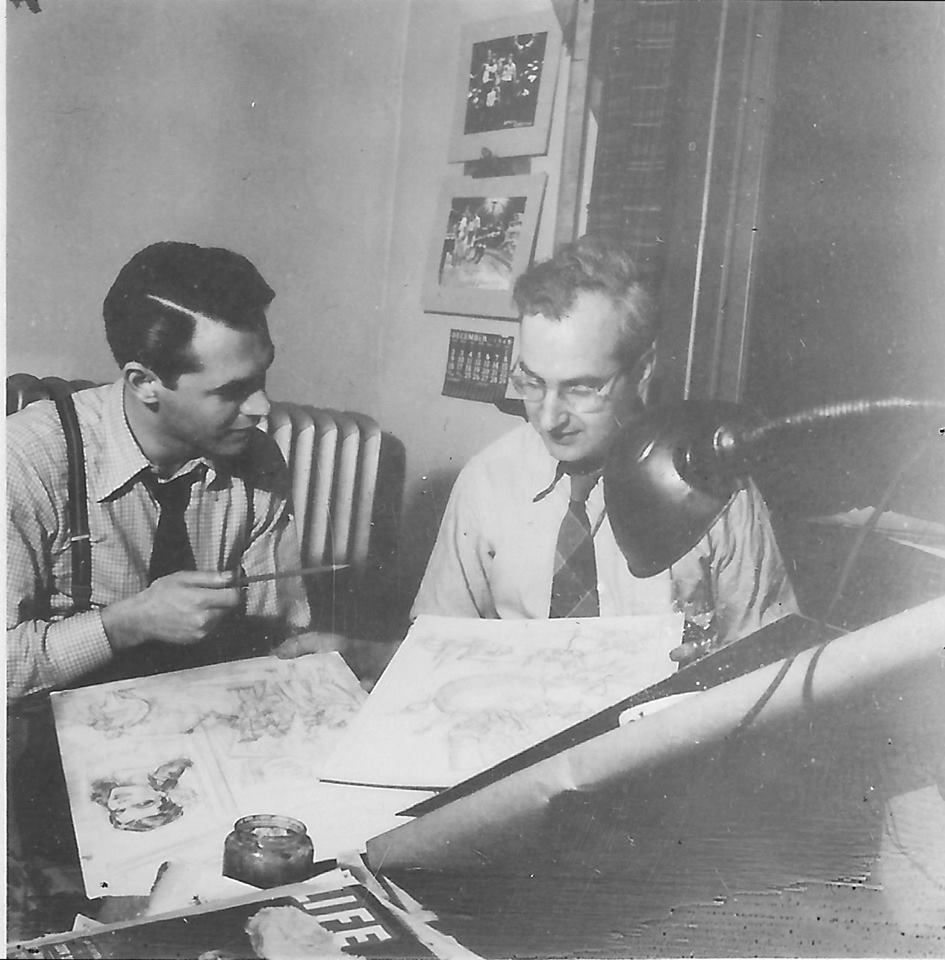
- Levey, on left with pencil. Circa 1946
- Born: August 13, 1921
- Died: August 18, 1984 (aged 63); Lake Placid, New York
- Other names: Lee Harris, Leland Harris, Harris Levy
- Occupations: comic book artist, magazine illustrator, art director

Harris Levey (August 13, 1921 – August 18, 1984), whose pseudonyms included Lee Harris, Leland Harris, and Harris Levy, was a comic book artist for DC Comics primarily in the 1940s. He co-created the Golden Age superhero Air Wave, who has continued, in new permutations, into the 21st century.

== Early life ==
As a teenager, Harris Levey studied at DeWitt Clinton High School in The Bronx. During his time there, he contributed illustrations to its literary magazine, The Magpie.

== DC Comics ==
Detective Comics #66 (Aug. 1942). Air Wave art by Levey as Lee Harris.

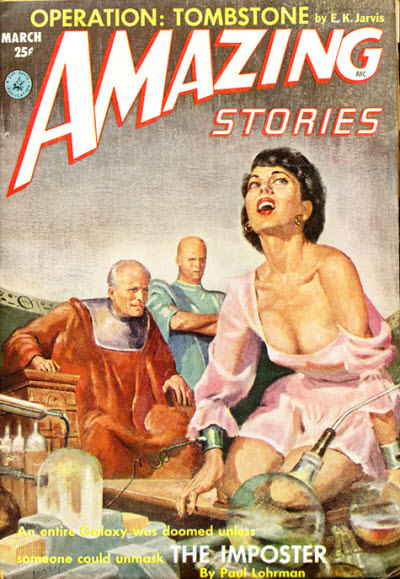
Amazing Stories, March 1953. Levey's only SF magazine cover.

Harris changed his name legally from Harris Levey to Leland Harris in his late teens following high school. After graduating, he worked briefly as an assistant to a theatrical magician billed as Dante.

His first known credited comic book work was the one-page filler "Super Sleuths" in Fox Comics' Mystery Men Comics #5 (Dec. 1939), near the beginning of the period historians and fans call the Golden Age of Comic Books. Creator credits were not routinely given during this period, making a comprehensive account of Levey's credits difficult to ascertain. However, following a story drawn for MLJ Comics in 1940, standard databases credit him as artist for a several-year on Detective Comics from the publisher National Comics, a forerunner of DC Comics. Among his first works there, he co-created the superhero Air Wave with a writer tentatively identified as either Mort Weisinger or Murray Boltinoff. Levey, credited as Lee Harris, drew the character's seven- to eight-page adventures from Detective Comics #60 (Dec. 1942) to at least #74 (April 1943). At this point, he left the comics industry to join the army.

He returned to comics with a Rin-Tin-Tin story in DC's Real Fact Comics #2 (June 1946) before taking over Air Wave's art once more in Detective Comics #114-137 (Aug. 1946 - July 1948).

Harris, often referred to in comic-book literature as Harris Levy, generally signed his DC work as Lee Harris, sometimes simply Harris, or as Leland Harris (the latter being his legal name at the time).

Harris' son, Jonathan Levey, was interviewed by Richard Arndt about Harris' contributions of artwork for DC comics and other publications, carried out during the Golden Age of comics. This 28 page interview was featured prominently in issue #125 (June 2014) of Alter Ego Magazine and was edited by comic writer and historian Roy Thomas. This feature article includes dozens of high-resolution colour scans scanned images of Harris' original artwork and serves as verification and as resource on the artistry and contributions of Harris.

== Commercial art and advertising ==
Circa 1948, Harris left the comic book field. In 1954, prior to his marriage to Elinor Seidl (1955), Harris changed his name legally from Leland Harris back to his original given name of Harris Levey. In 1956 and 1963, Harris and his wife had two sons. By the early 1960s, while living in the Stuyvesant Town apartment complex in Manhattan, Harris took a job with the New York Journal American newspaper. There and subsequently at The New York Times, he worked in commercial illustration, layout, design, and advertising copy.

During this period he created freelance cover illustrations for paperback book covers. He also illustrated the cover of the March 1953 issue of the science-fiction pulp magazine Amazing Stories, credited as Harris Levey.

Harris left the New York Times to serve as art director for the New York City advertising agencies Fuller-Smith & Ross, LM Frolich, Foote Cone & Belding, Ted Bates, and NW Ayer. In the early 1980s, Harris worked on print ads and a string of television commercials for the Bomstein/Gura Agency in Washington, D.C.

== Death ==
During a weekend with his wife at a cabin near Crown Point, New York in the Adirondack Mountains, Harris suffered a heart attack during a hike. He was taken to Lake Placid Memorial Hospital, where he died from heart failure at age 63.
