= Air Wave =

Fictional superhero in the DC Comics universe

Publication information
- Publisher: DC Comics
- First appearance: (Larry); Detective Comics #60 (February 1942) (Helen); DC Comics Presents #40 (December 1981) (Hal) (as Air Wave); Green Lantern (vol. 2) #100 (January 1978) (as Maser); Firestorm, the Nuclear Man #88 (August 1989) (Harold); Stargirl: The Lost Children #1 (January 2023)
- Created by: (Larry); Murray Boltinoff or Mort Weisinger; Harris Levey a.k.a. Lee Harris (Helen); Bob Rozakis; Alex Saviuk (Hal); Dennis O'Neil; Alex Saviuk (Harold); Geoff Johns; Todd Nauck

In-story information
- Alter ego: Lawrence "Larry" Jordan; Helen Jordan; Harold Lawrence "Hal" Jordan; Harold Levey
- Team affiliations: (Larry); All-Star Squadron (Hal); Captains of Industry; Suicide Squad; Justice League
- Notable aliases: (Hal); Maser
- Abilities: See below

Air Wave is the name of four superheroes appearing in American comic books published by DC Comics. The first two were active in the Golden Age of Comic Books (albeit the second Air Wave had only one appearance). The third and fourth appear in comics in the 21st century.

== Publication history ==
The original Air Wave (Larry Jordan) debuted during the period fans and historians call the Golden Age of Comic Books. His first appearance was in Detective Comics #60 (December 1942) by artist Harris Levey, who signed his work under the pen name "Lee Harris", and a writer tentatively identified as either Mort Weisinger or Murray Boltinoff. Levey drew the character's seven- to eight-page adventures from Detective Comics #60 (February 1942) to at least #74 (April 1943), and then following World War II in Detective Comics #114-137 (August 1946 - July 1948). In September 1942, Levey left the series to join the US Army Air Force (UAAF) as a photographer for the 15th Tactical Reconnaissance Photo Unit, turning the artwork over to his friend George Roussos for the 1943-46 issues. Levey returned to DC and resumed illustrating the Air Wave (July 1946, #113) and left DC and his Air Wave drawing duties in 1948 to pursue a career in advertising.

== Fictional character biographies ==
=== Larry Jordan ===
Law clerk Lawrence "Larry" Jordan had recently graduated from law school and was an intern at the Brooklyn District Attorney office. Noticing the rise of crime, Jordan decided to become a costumed crimefighter using technology, and used his interests in radio and electronics to create his equipment, including a cowl radio system that allowed him to listen in on police reports and special skates that enabled him to travel along telephone lines. He was accompanied by an outspoken parrot named Static, who occasionally aided him in battle (and, for narrative purposes, gave him someone with whom he could converse to provide exposition to the reader). His superhero activities were noticeable enough for a fictionalized President Franklin D. Roosevelt to request his participation in the All-Star Squadron.

Larry Jordan retires in 1948 and marries Helen soon afterward. Their son, Harold (Hal), is born as Larry continues his research into radio wave conversion.

In DC Comics Presents #40 (1981) Larry is attacked by Joe Parsons, an escaped convict who he had once prosecuted as a district attorney. Larry's costume malfunctions as he tries to protect his family and he dies from a shotgun wound to the chest.

In Dark Nights: Death Metal, Air Wave is among the superheroes who Batman resurrects using a Black Lantern ring.

=== Helen Jordan ===
Helen Jordan is the wife of Larry Jordan, the original Air Wave. After Larry's death, Helen briefly donned the Air Wave costume to bring his killer, Joe Parsons, to justice.

=== Harold Jordan ===
At a young age, Harold exhibits the ability to transmute himself into energy. Just as his father had modified his helmet and was preparing to train him to use his powers, Larry was killed. Eventually, Harold decided to follow in the footsteps of his father's career and took up the mantle of Air Wave. Furthermore, Harold is a cousin of Green Lantern Hal Jordan, with whom he shares his name. Air Wave initially appears as a supporting character of Hal, who taught him how to be a superhero. Starting in Action Comics #488, Hal was featured in adventures of his own. For the next couple of years, he appeared in the secondary stories of Action Comics, often alternating with the Atom.

When Air Wave is recruited by the Institute for Metahuman Studies to join a group of highly capitalist superheroes called the Captains of Industry, he used the code name Maser after undergoing genetic modification at the hands of Doctor Moon. This group was relatively short-lived and he soon resumed using Air Wave as his moniker.

During the Infinite Crisis event, Air Wave joins a team of superheroes, including Animal Man, Cyborg, and others, to investigate a destructive spatial warp. Air Wave instantly detects the cries for help coming from the ships being affected. These cries overwhelm him, causing his body to disperse into millions of radio waves.

During the Blackest Night event, Harold is resurrected as a member of the Black Lantern Corps. He is destroyed by the combined efforts of the Lantern corps, who had arrived to battle the Black Lanterns. Harold is permanently resurrected following The New 52 and DC Rebirth relaunches.

=== Harold Levey ===
Harold Levey, a new incarnation of Air Wave, is introduced in the 2023 miniseries Stargirl: The Lost Children. He is among the Golden Age sidekicks who are kidnapped and held on Childminder's island. When Stargirl and Red Arrow wash up on the island and Red Arrow is abducted by the egg-like Child Collectors, Stargirl is saved by Air Wave, Cherry Bomb, Wing, and Robotman's robotic dog Robbie. After Childminder is defeated and Wing returned to his own time, Air Wave is among the Lost Children who are brought to the present day by Hourman, as returning them to their own time would cause a time paradox. In the series Justice League Unlimited, Harold joins the Justice League.

== Powers and abilities ==
All three incarnations of Air Wave wield helmets that enable them to manipulate radio signals and transform into energy. The Larry Jordan incarnation travels via collapsible skates, whereas the Helen Jordan and Harold Jordan incarnations can fly.

== Enemies ==
His enemies were mostly Nazis and criminals, but he also fought some sound-based supervillains:

- Dr. Silence
- Parrot
- Talker

== In other media ==
The Larry and Harold Jordan incarnations of Air Wave appear as character summons in Scribblenauts Unmasked: A DC Comics Adventure.
