= Boneyard (comics) =

Comic book series by Richard Moore

Publication information
- Publisher: NBM Publishing
- Schedule: Quarterly
- Format: Ongoing series
- Genre: Horror, humor/comedy
- Publication date: 2001 - 2009
- No. of issues: 28

Creative team
- Created by: Richard Moore
- Written by: Richard Moore
- Artist: Richard Moore
- Letterer: Richard Moore

Collected editions
- Volume 1: ISBN 1-56163-427-1
- Volume 2: ISBN 1561634875
- Volume 3: ISBN 9781561635153
- Volume 4: ISBN 9781561635283
- Volume 5: ISBN 1561634794
- Volume 6: ISBN 9781561635108
- Volume 7: ISBN 9781561635832

Boneyard was an American quarterly comic book series created by Richard Moore, published by NBM Publishing, which ran 28 issues from 2001 to 2009. It is currently on hiatus.

== Publication history ==
There are currently 28 issues of Boneyard which have been published as a quarterly comic book title. In addition an un-numbered Swimsuit Special was released between issues 9 and 10. Every four issues are then collected into a trade paperback which are expected to remain in print for the foreseeable future. Currently all issues are available in seven black and white collections. Color reprints are also available for the first four collections, and have been announced for the entire run of trade paperbacks and will replace the current black and white pressings when the print run is sold. Issue 28 of the series, scheduled to be the last before a hiatus, was delayed "...[d]ue to personal reasons" and finally shipped in May 2009. A new installment had begun in 2013 with "The Biggening".

== Plot ==
A horror/comedy comic, the series begins with Michael Paris, an ordinary young man who has inherited a large plot of land upon his grandfather's death. The land is located in a town called "Raven's Hollow", and while Michael, or Paris as he prefers to be called, thinks he's just going to pick up the check for the land, he finds that the land is actually the town graveyard, called "The Boneyard". It's also not empty of active occupants, as a number of mythological creatures inhabit it.

== Cast ==
=== Boneyard residents ===
- Michael Paris - An ordinary young man who has just been on the bad end of a break up, he didn't know what he was getting into when he received the Boneyard as an inheritance. He has seemed to take it more or less in stride, and as a result, he has been accepted by the other things living there. He has a tendency to try to save the day - which often fails miserably - and he often needs to be pulled out of the fire by more capable people, typically Abbey. This turned around on Paris and the Boneyard crew in one story when the mystical graveyard denizens were under siege by a powerful nightmare spirit and only Paris' normality was able to evade the nightmare's clutches. Paris rose to the challenge and fought a pitched battle that required all his wits and ferocity to survive and save his friends.
- Abbey - Made a vampire two thousand years ago, Abbey is the oldest and probably most powerful resident of the Boneyard. She mostly hides this side of herself, and typically comes off as a witty, normal girl. She is romantically interested in Paris, as judged from her reactions to Nessie trying to flirt with him; but she cares about everyone at the Boneyard a great deal. Considering it animalistic and barbarous, Abbey is embarrassed by her vampiric side, to the point that she will put herself in considerable danger to avoid using it. When she is forced to go all-out, her countenance becomes considerably more fearsome, with glowing red eyes and large fangs. Abbey also possesses the traditional vampire powers - some degree of shape-changing, superhuman strength and durability, and an astonishing regenerative ability. She also has the traditional vulnerabilities, but age has given her some resistance to holy symbols, and the Boneyard's nearly perpetual black cloud keeps the sun from being a problem. For events such as a trip to the beach, she resorts to very powerful sunscreen.
- Nessie - An amphibious, oversexed being similar in shape to the Creature from the Black Lagoon, she is very flirtatious, and has no problem using her D-cup breasts to get what she wants. She is much more wild than Abbey, which causes a great deal of strife between the two. She is married to Brutus, and cheats on him. It has been revealed that Nessie's flirtatious ways have their roots in traumatic and sexually abusive experiences she suffered when she was captured and placed in a freak show when she was younger.
- Brutus - Nessie's husband, Brutus is the silent member of the Boneyard, never saying anything more than grunts and growls. Nessie refers to him as mute at one point. He is similar in appearance to Frankenstein's monster, with stitch-lines and bolts in his neck. Due to his silence, Brutus is largely an unknown quantity for now except to say that he is not terribly bright, not terribly small, and not terribly weak.
- Glump - A minor demon serving out a period of exile on the mortal plane for wrongdoing in the pits of Hell - apparently, he did something nice. Now, he seeks to enslave humanity and take over the world to prove to the infernal pit that he is up to the task of being a demon. Tragically for Glump, he's not very good with long term planning nor understanding human motivation, and usually succeeds only in making a mess or an inconvenience for the others in the graveyard. Glump is also secretly a Trekkie with a particular affinity for Mr. Spock, and for reasons unknown, he is terrified of socks.
- Sid - An animated skeleton who is perpetually smoking a cigar, and is also rather grumpy. He may be more of a sex fiend than Nessie is, but appears to lack the anatomy to fulfil his desire. He mainly deals with magazines and inflatable (skeletal) dolls. It is implied that Sid was once a live human, although his anatomy (as drawn) does not match normal human physiology; for example, he has no shoulder blades. With nothing binding his bones together, Sid is prone to being scattered into his component pieces. He is easy to put back together, however, as it doesn't seem to matter if bones are put in the wrong place.
- Ralph - A werewolf who never transmutes back into human form. Ralph rarely removes his sunglasses, though he has done so to help a lady in need, such as when Abbey was caught out on a sunny day at the beach, or to look eye to eye with a comely book store clerk. Like several (most?) other Boneyard inhabitants, Ralph appears to have a guilty secret in his past: Although he claims innocence, it appears he is wanted for murder. Ralph is an excellent mechanic and has repaired Paris' completely wrecked car a number of times: invariably, the car is quickly totaled again.
- Hildy - A kind-hearted and tough-skinned old Scottish witch. Her silly appearance (her eyes are never visible under an amazing mop of straw-like hair) belies her inner strength and wisdom as well as her own emotional vulnerability.
- Scratch - Little is known of this long-legged cat, other than that he appears to have at least one of his nine lives left. He spends most of his time in the strip in a catatonic state.
- Edgar - A talking raven, named after Poe. He appears to have prehensile wings and some form of ESP: When Abbey is hit by a car, Edgar senses that she is in trouble, but is too deeply involved with a card game to help. Edgar habitually wears glasses, either on his beak or around his neck.
- Nightcrawler - Combining a long, snake-like body with a six-eyed head (and three pairs of sunglasses), Nightcrawler is probably the most extraordinary Boneyard resident. He spends most of his time underground, digging his way through the soil. Exactly who or what he is has not yet been made clear; he appears to have telekinetic powers, a useful ability given that he has no hands or limbs of any kind. When first introduced, he claims to be on the trail of an incredibly powerful and evil entity, but no further details are given.
- Bob - While this character has yet to be seen in the comic, in the letters section Richard Moore has said there was a contest of sorts going on, the first person to write and ask who or what Bob was, would win. In issue 22, someone finally did, and Bob was revealed to be a giant tarantula with arachnophobia. He pretends he's a dog, and everyone else plays along to prevent him from freaking out.
- Mr. Vincent - The resident mortician and chief salesman for the Boneyard, Mr. Vincent appears perpetually dour and serious; he almost always refers to people by their full given names (Abbigail for Abbey, Vanessa for Nessie, etc.). He appears to be a tall human, always seen wearing a tuxedo with top hat and tails (on the jacket, not him). When business is down (as it appears to be during most of the run of the comic), he keeps in practice using Stan.
- Stan - One of the least active of the characters, Stan is a truly dead (as opposed to undead) human corpse that Mr. Vincent uses to keep in practice during slow periods; embalming, burying and exhuming so he can start again. It was stated in the comic that Stan had been embalmed so many times, he would probably still be around after a nuclear war, but he would still be dead.
- Leon and Boris - Considered weird even by other Boneyard residents, the two living stone gargoyles are mostly to be found guarding its front gate. Both have wings, but it is not yet known if they can actually fly. Leon is the more exuberant of the two, often seen singing or dancing, while Boris is far more stoic. The scene that perhaps sums up these two best was the beach trip, where they tried their hand at surfing: Leon assumed the 'traditional' surfer pose and shouted in glee, Boris sat in his usual pose and grumbled that the sport was overrated, and neither seemed aware that their surfboard had sunk to the seabed under the combined weight of their solid-rock bodies.

=== Villains ===
- Mayor Wormwood - The Mayor attempts to woo Paris into signing away his ownership of The Boneyard upon his arrival in Raven's Hollow, but Paris feels pangs of regret seeing that those living (and not living) on the property would be displaced and have nowhere else to go in a world that fears them. When Paris refuses to sell the place, Wormwood reveals his true aspect as Beelzebub, the Lord of Lies and attempts to terrify Paris into relinquishing the deed to the land. Ultimately this fails and Beelzebub retires to Hell to plot his next moves. It remains unrevealed as to why Beelzebub so desires the ownership of the Boneyard.
- Roxanne - A wealthy investor who arrives in town and becomes friendly with Paris despite Abbey's misgivings. She also fails to woo the deed away and reveals herself not only as the Arch-fiend Lillith, but as the centuries-old demon that gave Abbey her vampiric life. Abbey is nearly killed in the confrontation and it is only the intervention of her friends (and Paris' car) that keeps Abbey from being destroyed.
- The Doomsday frog - One of Glump's mad attempts at world domination. It remains unclear what the Doomsday frog was capable of, aside from giving its creator a hard time, but Glump created a "Doomsday Fly" to defeat it.
- Jack -The Jack O'Lantern-headed nightmare sent by Lillith to destroy the Boneyard residents. Jack has the ability to force his victim's worst fears out and trap them within their own nightmares. Only Paris, with many strong cups of coffee inside him, is able to withstand his dark power and prove how dangerous a fighter he can be when provoked.
- The I.R.S. - After Beelzebub leaves Raven's Hollow to plot his next attack, the Internal Revenue Service levies Paris with property taxes of over $500,000 - far more money than he can anticipate ever having. Several ill-fated schemes are hatched to raise the money for Paris in an attempt to keep the Boneyard's residents from losing their home. In reality, the Internal Revenue Service generally does not collect property taxes, just the federal portion of income, business and excise taxes; property taxes are generally charged and collected by the local municipalities.
- The Slasher - A broad spoof of monster movie icon Jason Voorhees, although he also used a chainsaw à la Leatherface. This nameless killer haunted Camp Waterlake till Abbey destroyed him. It was revealed that he was a supernatural puppet created by Lillith.

== Collected editions ==
The series has been collected into a number of trade paperbacks:

- Volume 1 (July 2005, B&W ISBN 1561634271)
- Volume 2 (December 2006, B&W ISBN 1561633690)
- Volume 3 (2004, B&W ISBN 1561634050/color ISBN 978-1-56163-515-3)
- Volume 4 (June 2008, B&W ISBN 1561634247/color ISBN 978-1-56163-528-3)
- Volume 5 (x 200x, B&W ISBN 1-56163-479-4)
- Volume 6 (November 2007, ISBN 1-56163-510-3)
- Volume 7 (July 2010, ISBN 1-56163-583-9)

== Awards ==
- Book of the Year 2005 Gold Medal in Graphic Novels from ForeWord magazine.
