= MBQ (manga) =

English language manga series

- Cover of MBQ vol. 1 (2005), art by Felipe Smith
- Author: Felipe Smith
- Publisher: Tokyopop (U.S.); SoftBank Creative (Japan)
- Original run: 2005–2007
- Volumes: 3

MBQ is an original English-language manga created by Tokyopop's Rising Stars of Manga second-place winner Felipe Smith.

MBQ is an expansion of his second-place winning entry in the third Rising Stars competition. It is the story of a young man named Omario who is trying to earn a living making comics in the City of Angels.

== Release ==
Written and illustrated by Felipe Smith, MBQ was published in North America by Tokyopop in three volumes from July 12, 2005, to October 9, 2007.

=== Volume list ===
No.	Release date	ISBN
01	July 12, 2005	978-1-59182-067-3
Chapters 1—9
02	April 11, 2006	978-1-59816-412-1
Chapters 10—16
03	October 9, 2007	978-1-4278-0193-7

- Japanese version

MBQ ～What's up? 転・落・人・生!!!～ (distributed by eBOOK Initiative Japan Co,. Ltd. on PC and cell phone June 15, 2007)
MBQ-テイルズ・オブ・LA- 1. ISBN 978-4-7973-5431-7 (published by SoftBank Creative April 23, 2009)

== Reception ==
Publishers Weekly named MBQ as one of the Best Comics of 2005.
