= Charles G. Bush =

American cartoonist (1842–1909)

C. G. Bush
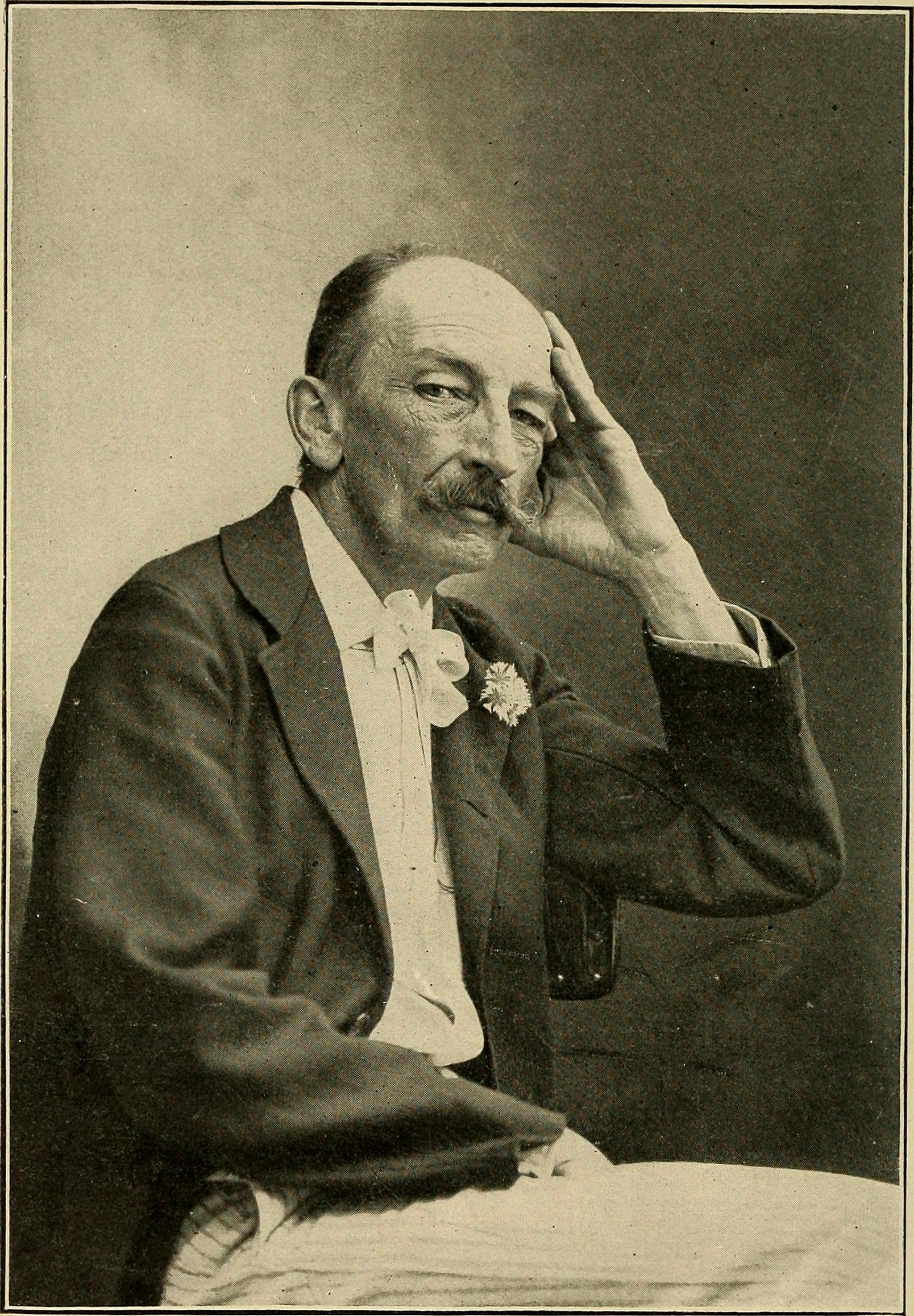
- Bush circa 1904
- Born: 1842 Boston, Massachusetts
- Died: May 21, 1909 (aged 66–67) Camden, South Carolina
- Area: Cartoonist

Charles Green Bush (1842 – May 21, 1909) was an American newspaper cartoonist who has been called the "originator of the daily newspaper cartoon". His work appeared in New York papers such as the Telegram, Herald, and the later the World, and was known for its cleverness and simplicity.

== Gallery ==
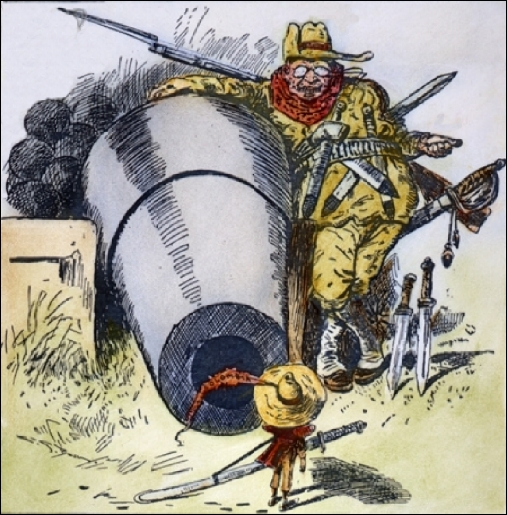
1903 cartoon depicting Theodore Roosevelt intimidating Colombia to acquire the Canal Zone

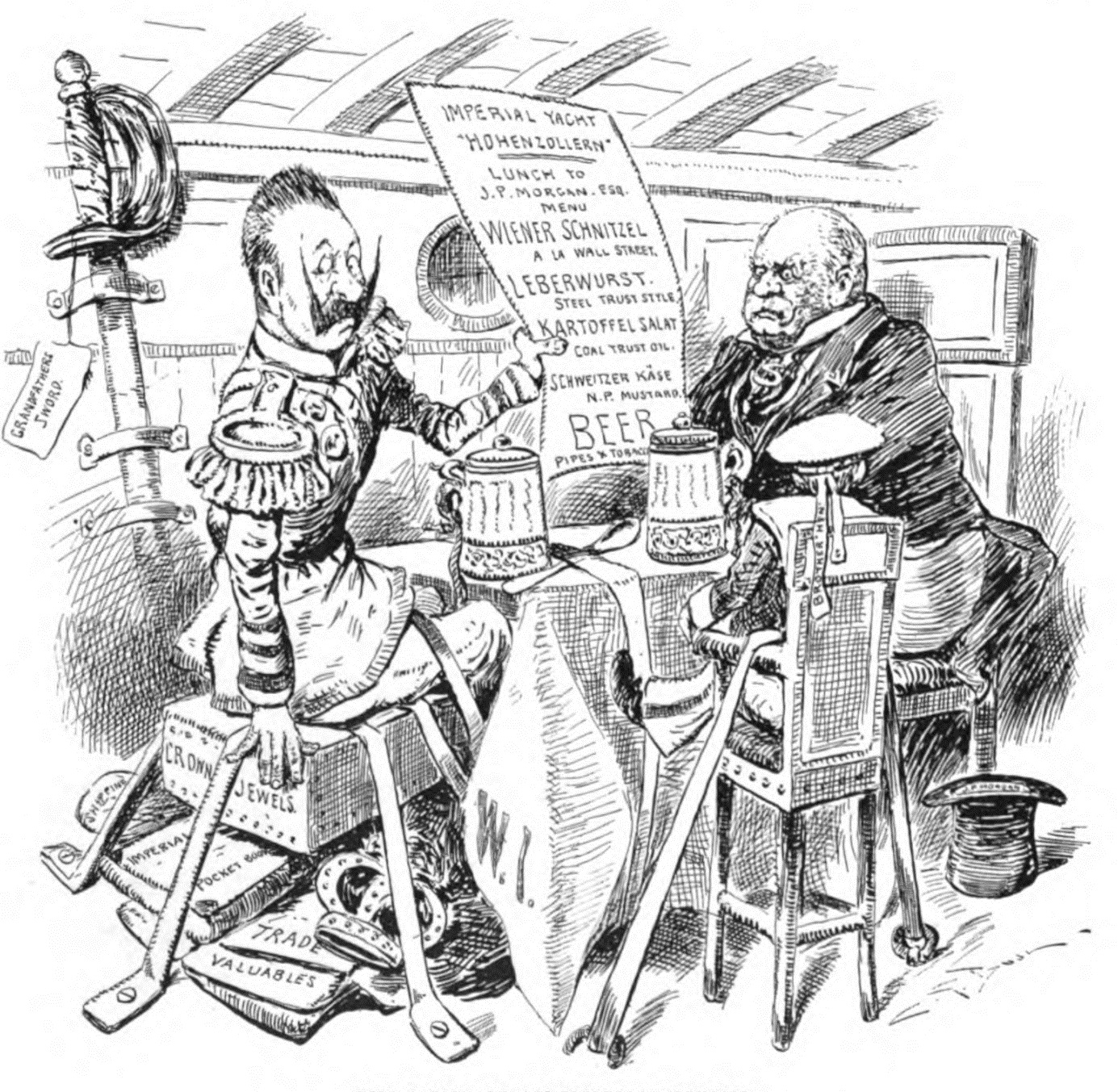
"The Menus of an Imperial Lunch" (c. 1903)

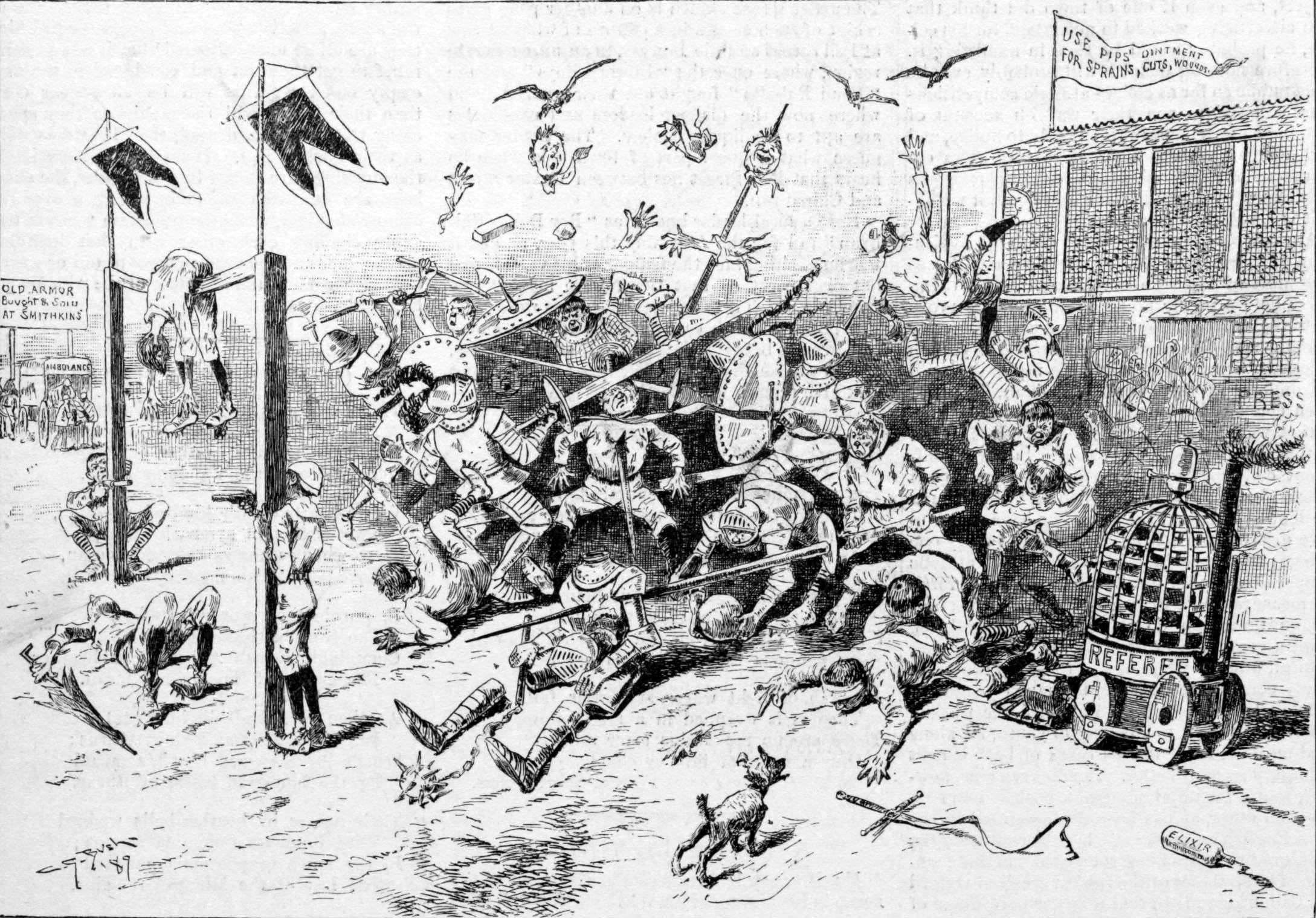
"The Foot-ball of the Future" (1899)
