= Frank Miller (newspaper cartoonist) =

American cartoonist

Frank Miller (October 2, 1898 – December 3, 1949) was an American cartoonist.

== Biography ==
Born in Sheldon, Iowa, Miller was most famous for his comic strip Barney Baxter in the Air, created in 1936 for King Features Syndicate, and renamed simply Barney Baxter in 1943. Miller spent his early thirties working on staff at Denver's Rocky Mountain News where he created Barney Baxter in 1935 for the paper's "Junior Aviator" page.

Miller sold his first cartoon in 1919 and slowly built up his professional reputation. By the mid-1920s, he decided to make cartooning his full-time profession, working for the Denver Post and the Rocky Mountain News. In 1936, Miller took Barney Baxter to King Features. In 1942, he left the strip to Bob Naylor and joined the US Coast Guard, resuming his feature in 1948.

An aviator himself, Miller was a member of the Flying Service Club and the National Aeronautics Association. He was a sponsor and instructor of Denver's Junior Flying Club. Miller died from a heart attack on December 3, 1949, at his home in Daytona Beach, Florida.
