= Jim Sasseville =

American cartoonist

James Frederick Sasseville (August 28, 1927 – November 30, 2005) was an American cartoonist and graphic artist, best known for his work with Peanuts creator Charles M. Schulz.

Born in Minneapolis, Minnesota, he graduated from the Minneapolis College of Art in 1948. He served in both World War II and the Korean War. He worked at the Art Instruction Schools, where he met fellow Minnesotan Schulz. Sasseville worked with Schulz on the short-lived sports comic strip It's Only a Game (1957–1959) and the Peanuts comic book feature, where he was succeeded by Dale Hale. Though he followed Schulz to California in 1959, in 1960 he left cartooning to become a graphic artist. Jim Sasseville died on November 30, 2005.

== Bibliography ==
- Charles Schulz and Jim Sasseville, It's Only a Game, 2004, ISBN 0-9716338-9-4
