= Barney Baxter =

American comic strip by Frank Miller

Frank Miller's Barney Baxter (January 22, 1950). This was the last Sunday episode. To see the details in this image, go to Stripper's Guide.

Barney Baxter in the Air is an American comic strip by Frank Miller. It started its run on September 30, 1935, for the Denver's Rocky Mountain News. Starting on December 7, 1936, it was syndicated by King Features. Barney Baxter was an "adventure strip" involving heroic exploits centering on aviation.

The strip was drawn by Miller until 1943 when Bob Naylor took over the duties for a short period. In 1943, the title was shortened to Barney Baxter. Miller returned to the strip in 1946. The strip was discontinued by King Features on January 22, 1950, following Miller's death on March 12, 1949.

== Characters and story ==
Young aviator Barney Baxter experienced numerous airborne adventures, and during World War II, he battled both German and Japanese villains. Baxter was often accompanied by his sidekick Gopher Gus, who (unlike the rest of the characters) was drawn with the exaggerated facial features of a "humour strip" character. Other characters were Barney's mother, his rival love interests, Patricia and Maura, and his buddy Hap Walters. Comic strip historian Don Markstein noted:

Barney wasn't your standard pretty-boy hero. He was a bit on the short side and pudgy. His face looked kind of lumpy and was covered with freckles. He didn't have a big, toothy grin—in fact, he didn't smile very much at all. Of course, he wasn't downright ugly—his pal, Gopher Gus, a desert rat turned pilot, was the ugly one. His other pal, Hap Walters, a sometime-girlfriend named Patricia and Barney's mom rounded out the cast. They had one thrilling adventure after another, fighting spies, air pirates, Latin American warlords and, when the time came, Nazis and Japs; and they kept it up for almost a decade and a half. The cartoonist behind Barney and his entourage was Frank Miller—but not the Frank Miller who became famous decades later for his work on Elektra, Batman and Sin City. This Frank Miller was born in 1898 and spent his early thirties working on staff at Denver's Rocky Mountain News. There, he created Barney in 1935 for the paper's "Junior Aviator" page. At first the hero was a boy just entering his teens, who had a burning interest in airplanes; but the series took a more adventurous turn when a grown-up aviator named Cyclone Smith took him (with Mom's permission) on a trip to Alaska. By the time Barney got home, he was a seasoned crime fighter. Barney Baxter in the Air (as the strip was originally called—it dropped the last part in 1943) had been running a little more than a year when Miller moved East to work at William Randolph Hearst's New York Mirror; and from then on, Barney was no longer a one-paper strip. Starting in December, 1936, it was distributed by Hearst's King Features Syndicate. By that time, Barney had rapidly aged to about his late teens or early twenties. Miller's plots moved fast enough to keep most readers from noticing the occasionally large holes in them.

Frank Miller's Barney Baxter in the Air
