= Al Scaduto =

American cartoonist (1928–2007)

- Al Scaduto self-portrait
- Born: Alvaro Scaduto; July 12, 1928 Bronx, New York
- Died: December 8, 2007 (aged 79) Sleepy Hollow, New York
- Area: Cartoonist
- Awards: National Cartoonists Society's Newspaper Panel Cartoon Award, 1979 and 1991

Alvaro Scaduto (July 12, 1928 – December 8, 2007), better known as Al Scaduto, was a cartoonist noted for his 61-year span of work for King Features Syndicate on the classic strips, They'll Do It Every Time and Little Iodine, which Jimmy Hatlo created.

Born in the Bronx, Scaduto attended high school at the School of Industrial Art, where he focused on cartooning and won several awards. He also studied at the Art Students League. After graduating from the School of Industrial Art in 1946, he joined the art department at King Features, and two years later, he teamed with cartoonist Bob Dunn on They'll Do It Every Time.

Over a 14-year period, Scaduto drew both the Little Iodine newspaper strip and comic books. The character appeared in a series of 56 Dell Comics published between 1949 and 1962. Scaduto continued to work with Dunn after Hatlo's death in 1963.

== Hatlo to Dunn to Scaduto ==
After Dunn's death in 1989, Scaduto took over They'll Do It Every Time, doing the writing and art for both the daily and the Sunday strip. He continued on the feature into his seventies, commenting, "What I like most about being a cartoonist is starting with a fresh piece of paper and ending up with an idea. You're the writer, the actor and the director. I never thought about retiring. I enjoy what I do." He often listened to opera while he worked. Rather than hire a new cartoonist after Scaduto's death, King Features chose to cancel They'll Do It Every Time, and the last strip was published February 2, 2008.

In addition to illustrating for magazines, ads and children's books, Scaduto designed greeting cards, games, toys and packaging.

== Awards ==
Al Scaduto's They'll Do It Every Time (March 7, 2007)

In 1979, Scaduto and Dunn received the National Cartoonists Society's Newspaper Panel Cartoon Award. In 1991, Scaduto was again honored with the same award.

== Personal life ==
For his NCS profile, written in 2003, Scaduto described his personal life: "Married 50 years to Joyce Lawrence. Currently keeping company with fiancee Claire Adelman. Two daughters Deby and Patricia. Grandkids—Allison, Atticus & Lazarus." After the death of his wife in 2000, Scaduto moved to Milford, Connecticut, to live with his youngest daughter, Patricia Violette.

== Death ==
Scaduto died December 8, 2007, in Sleepy Hollow, New York, following a short-term illness.
