= Bob Dunn (cartoonist) =

American cartoonist, entertainer and gagwriter

Bob Dunn

Bob Dunn (March 5, 1908 – January 31, 1989) was an American cartoonist, entertainer and gagwriter who drew several comic strips. In addition to his own strips, Dunn was known for his work on Jimmy Hatlo's Little Iodine and They'll Do It Every Time, and is said to have invented the modern knock-knock joke in 1936.

== Career ==
Bob Dunn's Just the Type (April 26, 1942)

Dunn began his career at King Features. He submitted gags to newspapers and magazines and sold skits to Earl Carroll for his Vanities on Broadway in 1930–31. In 1936, "he invented the knock-knock joke" in Knock Knock: Featuring Enoch Knox, a book he wrote that sold over two million copies. More successful books followed including I'm Gonna Be a Father, Hospital Happy, One Day in the Army and Magic for All. During World War II, he contributed to the war effort, as noted in the September 19, 1942 issue of Editor & Publisher, "Another cartoonist doing his bit is Press Alliance artist Bob Dunn, whose Brassband Bixby enlisted in the armed forces shortly after December 7. The hero is in Navy Intelligence. Dunn has made many personal appearances at Army camps and U.S.O. centers making caricatures of the officers and men as well as entertaining them with his amateur magician and card tricks." Following the war, King Features syndicated Dunn's Just the Type from May 5, 1946 to November 24, 1963. It ran in the New York Journal-American and several other newspapers. Comics historian Allan Holtz commented, "Never a syndication success, King Features may well have let him do the feature just to keep him happy while working on the Hatlo cash cow feature... When Hatlo died in 1963, though, Dunn's workload presumably got that much heavier and Just the Type was dropped. Dunn finally got an official byline on They'll Do It Every Time starting in 1966."

In 1947, soon after the founding of the National Cartoonists Society, Dunn, his good friend Rube Goldberg and a group of leading cartoonists from the NCS went on a three-month tour of the US and helped sell $58 million in US Savings Bonds. Dunn's card tricks and feats of mental magic blended with Goldberg's comic inventions for a show that amused audiences across the country.

=== Television ===
He starred in two shows in the early days of television. The first was Face to Face (NBC, June 1946 to January 1947). The second and more popular was Quick on the Draw (DuMont local show beginning May 1950, and on the DuMont network January to December 1952), a celebrity panel show first hosted by Eloise McElhone and later by Robin Chandler. Dunn drew cartoon charades that celebrities would try to figure out. He was one of the cartoonists featured in a network television special on NBC, The Fabulous Funnies (1966). He was a long-time member of the famed theatrical Lambs Club to which he contributed drawings, scripts and personal appearances. He also was the Official Toastmaster of the National Cartoonists Society for which he served as President (1965–1967). Dunn appeared on the January 10, 1966 episode of the CBS game show To Tell the Truth.

== Awards ==
Bob Dunn and Hy Eisman's Little Iodine (June 7, 1970)

They'll Do It Every Time and Little Iodine brought Dunn several awards. He won the National Cartoonists Society Newspaper Panel Cartoon Award for the years 1968 and 1969. He won it again in 1979 with Al Scaduto. Dunn won the National Cartoonists Society's highest honor, the Reuben Award, in 1975. He also received their Silver T-Square Award in 1957 and the Elzie Segar Award, named after the creator of Popeye.

== Sources ==
- The World Encyclopedia of Cartoons. Chelsea House, 1980.
