= Hat tip =

Gesture of respect

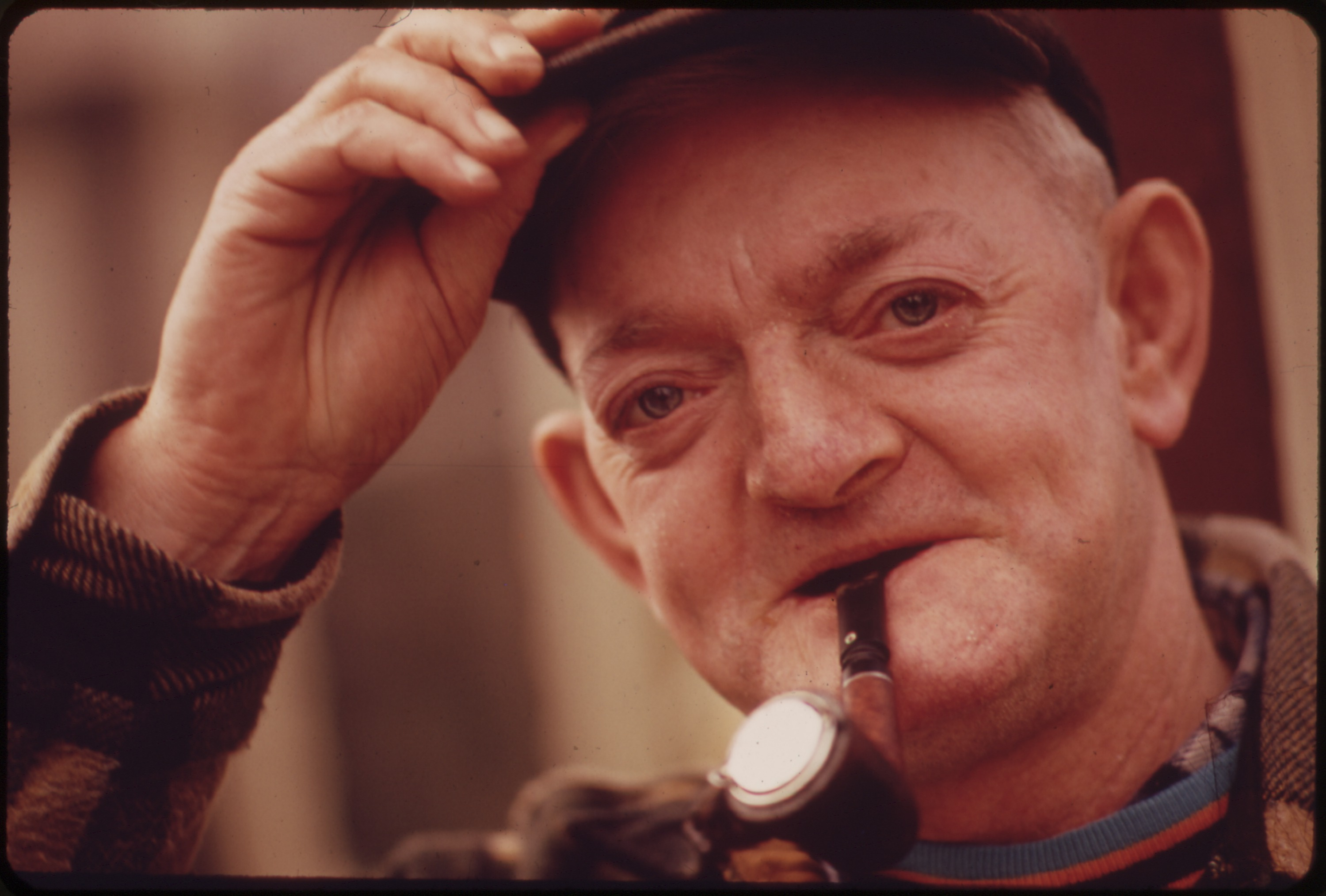
A man tipping his cap in greeting

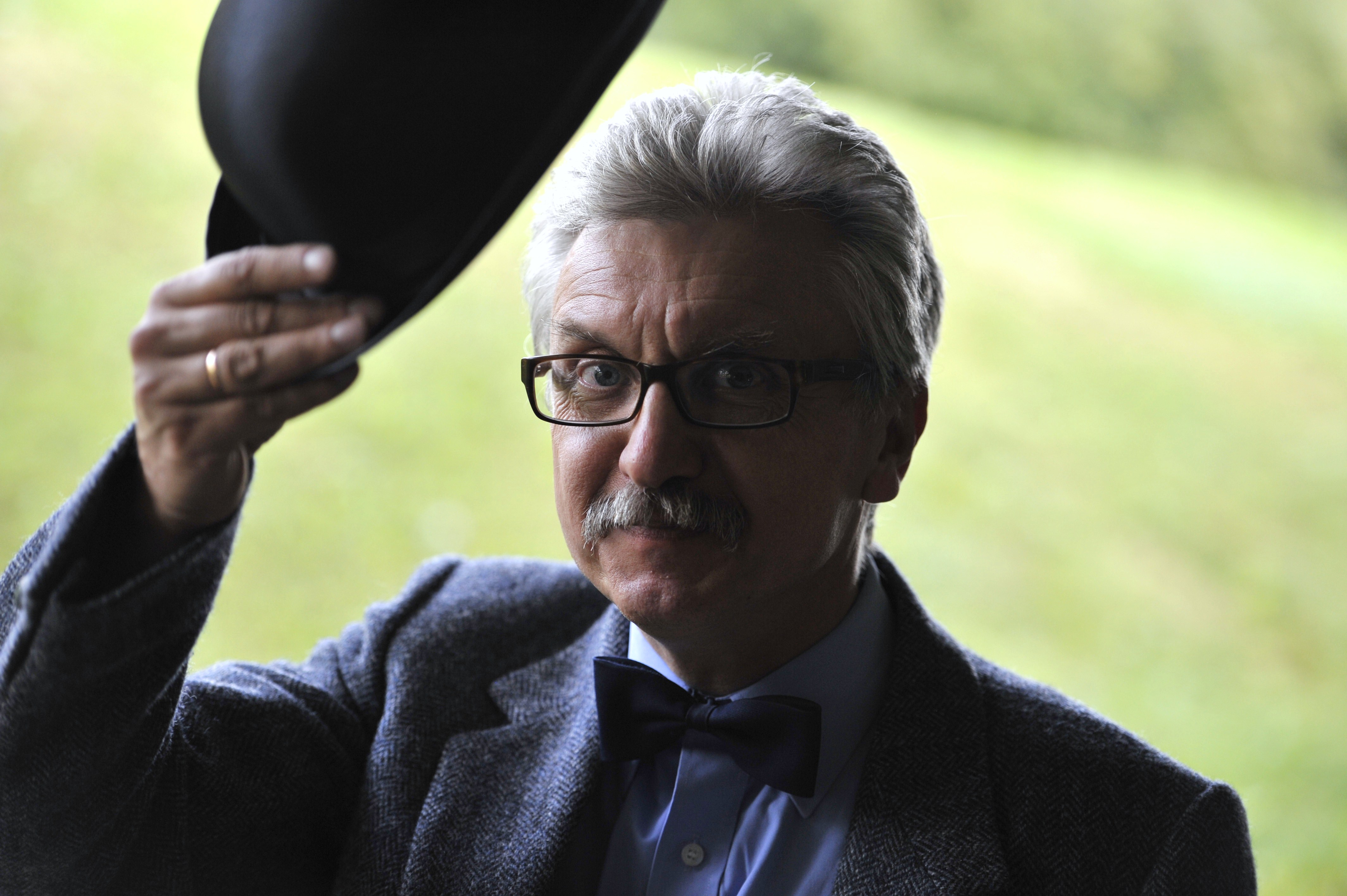
A man doffing his hat

A hat tip (abbreviation: h/t), also referred to as tip of the cap, is an act of tipping or (especially in British English) doffing one's hat as a cultural expression of recognition, respect, gratitude or simple salutation and acknowledgement between two persons.

== Traditional ==
In Western societies of the 19th and early 20th centuries, a hat tip was a common non-verbal greeting between friends or acquaintances while walking or meeting at a social gathering. Typically, two men (female hat tipping was rare) would lift or tip their hats to each other, rather than exchange words of greeting. Where the ritual was used to emphasize social distance, the subordinate was obliged to make the more elaborate gesture, for example fully removing his hat while the superior merely touched his. The military hand salute is thought to have originated as a stylized hat tip; while the civilian may return a salute via a hat tip. In its modern use, the hat tip has been replaced by the nod as a manner of respect. If one man gives another the nod, he should return in kind with either the casual nod up or the formal nod down.

Erving Goffman emphasized the role of hat-tipping as a means of closing encounters between male and female, and restoring both parties thereby to a state of civil inattention. He also suggested that the hat tip was used for greeting a stranger, whereas the equivalent greeting for an acquaintance was the bow.

In Desmond Morris's terms, the hat tip is a modification of a (symbolic) submissive posture—lowering the body height by removing the hat—a "token token".

== Metaphor ==
In 1929, syndicated cartoonist Jimmy Hatlo started thanking readers who suggested a funny idea for a strip with the phrase "Thanx and a tip of the Hatlo hat to [name]" at the bottom of his comic strip panel They'll Do It Every Time. He continued drawing the hat tip box in the strip until his death in 1963.

In the Protectorate of Bohemia and Moravia, the government banned hat tipping toward Jews and other courtesies that became popular as protests against the occupation by Nazi Germany.

In the 2000s, the term "hat tip" (often abbreviated to "HT", "H/T" or "h/t") rose to prominence in the blogosphere to acknowledge someone who has made a significant contribution toward an effort, or someone who drew attention to something new or interesting. It is considered good netiquette when sharing a link or news item to give a hat tip to the person from whom it was learned. The on-line versions of the Wall Street Journal and The New York Times regularly give hat tips to users who bring ideas for articles to their attention.

== See also ==
- Emily Post
- Etiquette
- Ethology
- Gesture
- List of gestures
- Respect
