= Mushmouth =

Mushmouth may refer to:

- Mushmouth, a character from the comic strip Moon Mullins
- Mushmouth, a character from the animated cartoon Fat Albert and the Cosby Kids
- Norwegian sea bass, particularly those native to Flekkefjord
- Skipjack tuna
- Mushmouth may also refer to the character Mushmouth Thomas frequently featured on The Dunham and Miller Show on The Ticket in Dallas
