= Toni Mendez =

American literary agent

- Born: November 2, 1908; Portugal
- Died: March 9, 2003 (aged 94); New York City, U.S.
- Education: Columbia University
- Occupation: Literary agent for cartoonists
- Employer(s): Tony Mendez, Inc.
- Known for: helping to form the National Cartoonists Society
- Spouses: Harry S. Dale (m. 1958; died 1962) Samuel "Shap" O. Shapiro (m. 1965; died 1990)
- Family: Cynthia Weilniece, and Dorthy Mendez sister, Jenn Mann great niece.
- Awards: Newspaper Feature Council Jester Award, 1972; Ohio State University Distinguished Service Award, 1987

Toni Mendez (November 2, 1908 – March 9, 2003) was an American agent for writers and cartoonists handling negotiations, licensing, and syndication/secondary rights agreements. In addition she became secondary rights representative of all properties for the Field Newspaper Syndicate, the Newspaper Enterprise Association, and Publishers-Hall Syndicate. Mendez played a key role in the formation of the National Cartoonist Society, and was involved with the now defunct Newspaper Features Council. Among her numerous clients were Milton Caniff, B. Kliban, and Frank Willard. She was involved with negotiating media tie-in deals for television series such as Steve Canyon, Tom Corbett, Space Cadet and All in the Family. Mendez was known for her stylish hats.

== Biography ==
=== Early life ===
Born in Portugal, she immigrated to New York and briefly attended Columbia University before becoming a Rockette. She then had a solo dancing career and eventually became a choreographer. This led to her involvement with the American Theatre Wing Hospital Committee producing entertainment for hospitalized servicemen during World War II. She recruited cartoonists to give chalk talks, and the ensuing camaraderie they enjoyed doing them eventually encouraged creation of the National Cartoonists Society. As the troubleshooter for the association she gained experience that allowed a segue into a career (as Toni Mendez, Inc.) handling business affairs for cartoonists and eventually branching out to also handling writers and illustrators.

=== Later years ===
She was a speaker at the 1995 Festival of Cartoon Art.

Editor & Publisher in its obituary reported, "She was involved with running her agency until the end of her life."

Ted Rall concluded the acknowledgement for Wake Up, You're Liberal! (2004) by stating "During the last few years of her long, interesting and important life, my agent Toni Mendez encouraged this project as only she could. Toni, here's to you; I hope I did well."

Bequests from her estate partially funded the launch of the National Cartoonist Society Foundation and production of the "We Are Family" music video, the latter of which became the object of controversy.

== Personal life ==
She married Harry S. Dale, vice-president of the Book of the Month Club on September 17, 1958. Dale died on October 24, 1962. Mendez then married Samuel "Shap" O. Shapiro, vice-president and circulation director of Cowles Communications on April 14, 1965. Shapiro died on September 4, 1990.

Her niece is famed lyricist Cynthia Weil who cited her aunt as inspiring her own career, stating that Mendez "understood the creative soul".

== Awards ==
In 1972 the Newspaper Feature Council awarded her their Jester Award. Ohio State University in 1987 awarded her its Distinguished Service Award. She also was honored by the United States Navy and Anti-Defamation League.
