= Tom's Restaurant and Bar =

Restaurant and bar in Portland, Oregon, U.S.

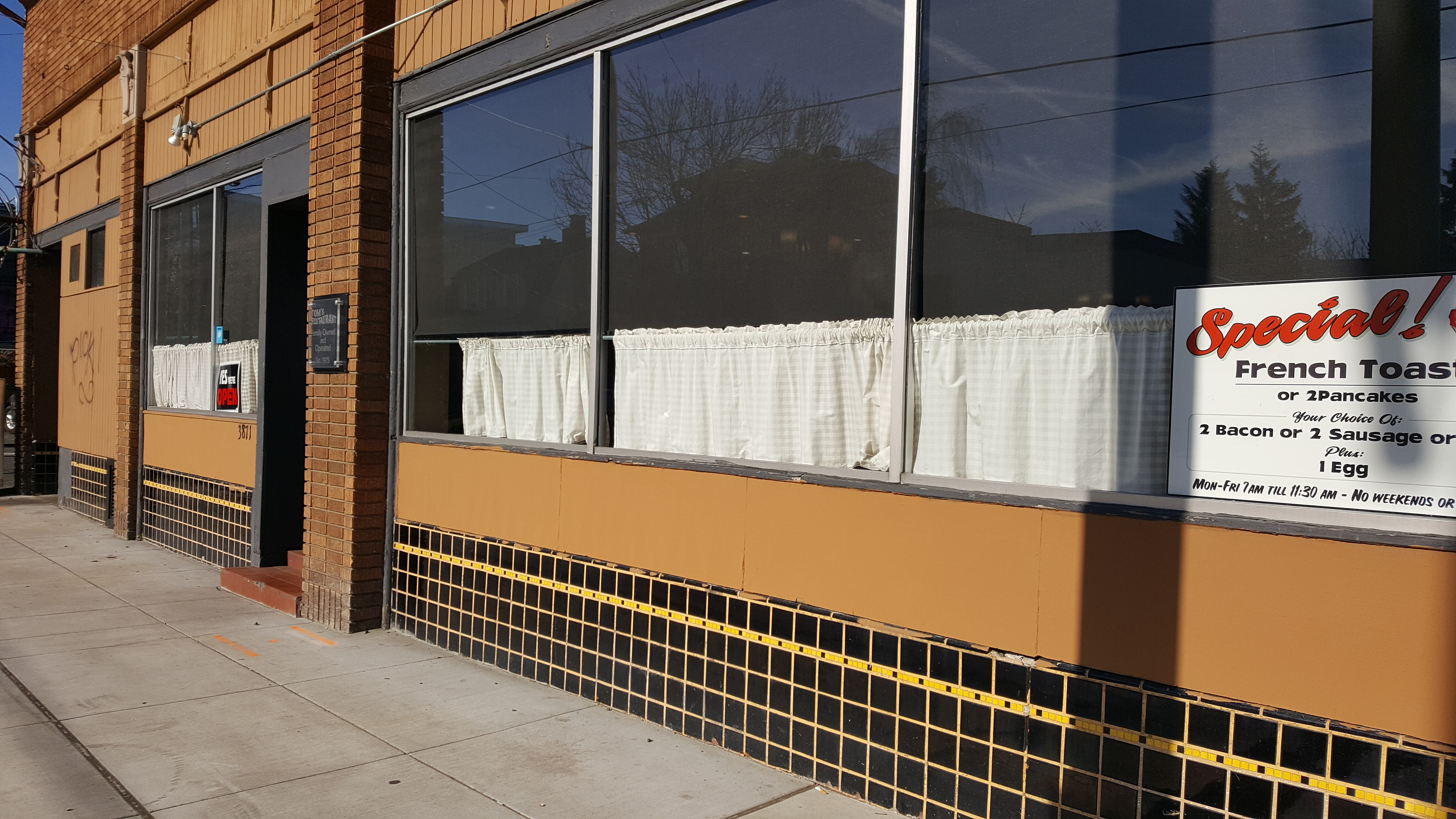
- The restaurant's exterior, 2022
- Interactive map of Tom's Restaurant and Bar

Restaurant information
- Established: December 18, 1975
- Owners: Antoinette and Taki Papailiou
- Previous owners: Tom and Georgia Belesiu
- Food type: American
- Location: 3871 Southeast Division Street, Portland, Multnomah, Oregon, 97202, United States
- Coordinates: 45.5050°N 122.6229°W
- Website: tomspdx.com

Tom's Restaurant and Bar, sometimes referred to separately as Tom's Restaurant and Tom's Bar, is a restaurant and bar in Portland, Oregon, United States. Tom and Georgia Belesiu opened the diner in 1975; ownership was later transferred to their daughter Antoinette, who worked for the business as a teenager, and her husband Taki Papailiou. The menu, based on Georgia's recipes, has changed little over the years, and the greasy spoon is known for serving breakfast all day and for having an inexpensive happy hour menu.

== Description ==
Tom's Restaurant and Bar is located on Division Street at the intersection of Cesar Chavez Boulevard in southeast Portland's Richmond neighborhood. Originally a restaurant, the north side was expanded to include a bar, which has been described by Willamette Week as a "divey sports bar known for the thick cloud of smoke wafting off from the picnic tables out front". The newspaper described Tom's as a "Dazed and Confused-era diner, which seems increasingly out of place on this rapidly changing stretch of Division Street", and as "an old school dentist's office waiting room, but with a sassy waitress who doesn't come to a complete stop as she asks 'You want cream?' If you do want cream, she pull seven little creamer cups out of an apron pocket and plops them down on the counter without breaking stride. When she gets back behind the bar, she rejoins the longest conversation about fleas you'll hear all year." Tom's also has a small off-track betting area located between the restaurant and bar areas.

The Portland Mercury has described Tom's as a "seriously underrated, East Coast-style" diner and a greasy spoon with "outlandishly cheap" happy hour options. An exterior sign uses "Tom Jones' '70s Vegas" font, according to the newspaper's Brian Yaeger. The restaurant has an interior mural, and the bar has artificial leather booths, pool tables, Skee-Ball, table football, and video poker machines.

Breakfast is served all day. Full breakfast options include bacon, ham, or sausage, egg, and French toast or pancakes. The menu also includes a "butterhorn" fritter, chicken fried steak with gravy, hash browns, omelettes, soups, and coffee supplied by Boyd's Coffee. Happy hour options include quesadillas and tater tots.

== History ==
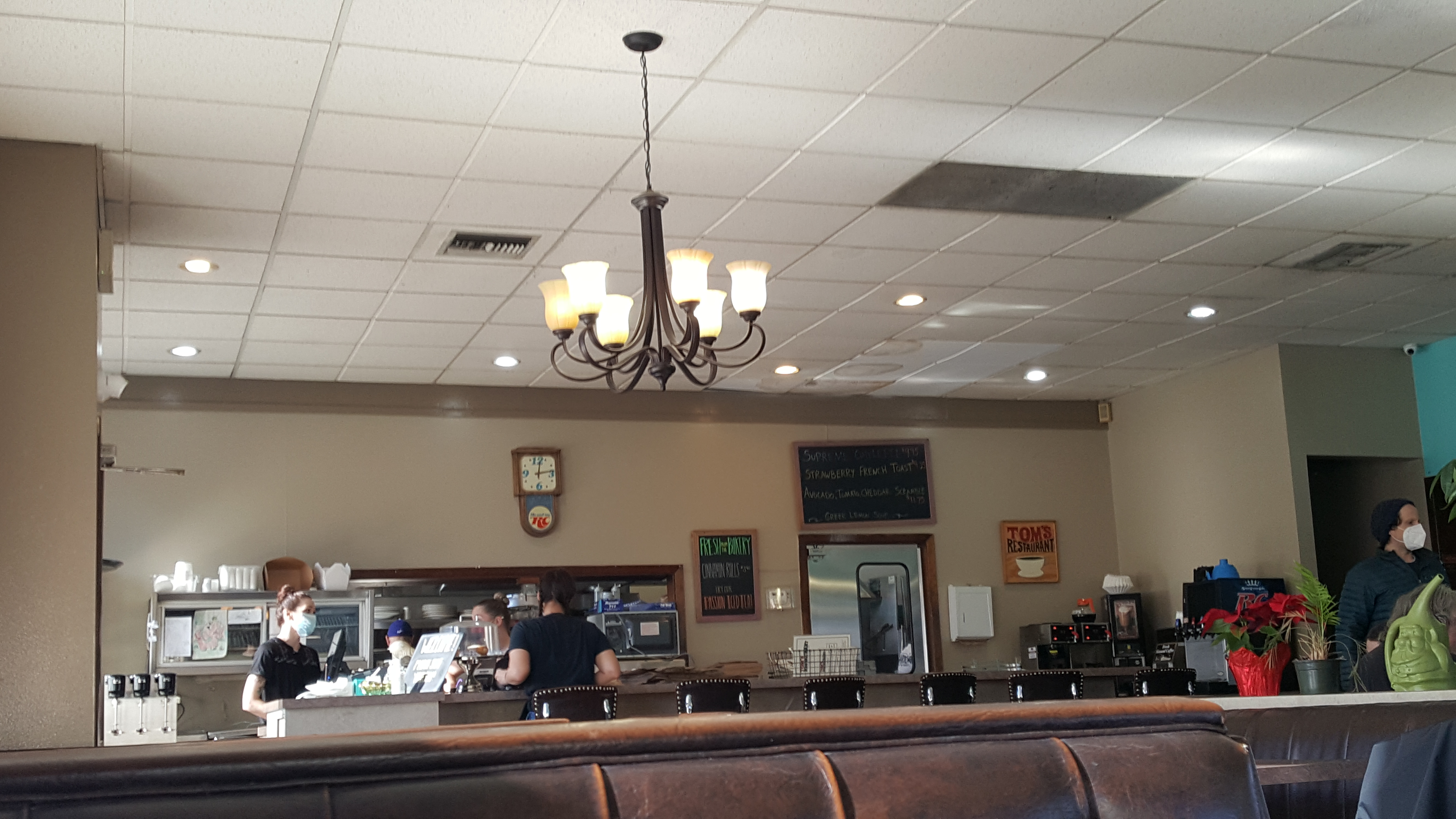
The restaurant's interior, 2022

Tom and Georgia Belesiu opened the restaurant on December 18, 1975, in a space which previously housed an ice cream parlor and later a bakery. Tom built the restaurant in 1974, and many of the entrees are based on Georgia's recipes. In 1988, Steve Duin of The Oregonian said Tom "doesn't bore his patrons with politics". Belesiu said, "I don't want to lose anyone. Both parties are welcome here. I'm a politician. A diplomat."

The couple's daughter Antoinette began working at the restaurant from the start, when she was 14 years old. She and her husband Taki Papailiou, who previously worked as the morning cook, are now co-owners. The family also owns the building and adjacent parking lot. Nick Papailiou is also an owner, as of 2020.

Earl Blumenauer visited the restaurant in 1991, during his mayoral campaign. In 2010, Nancy Travis filmed scenes at the restaurant for A Walk in My Shoes. Tom's has a high employee retention; as of 2016, there were 16 employees, including cooks and waitresses who had worked at Tom's for 15 and 30 years, respectively.

According to KGW's Morgan Romero, Tom's relies mostly on alcohol sales for revenue. In November 2020, during the COVID-19 pandemic, Romero said Tom's Bar "will rely on takeout from Tom's Restaurant next door to survive. They're calling on their regulars and the community to support them and other local bars and restaurants by ordering take-out." Tom's also sought COVID-19 relief funding via GoFundMe in 2020.

The bar caught fire in March 2026. There were no injuries. The main restaurant is temporarily closed but the attached bar continues to operate with a limited menu.

== Reception ==
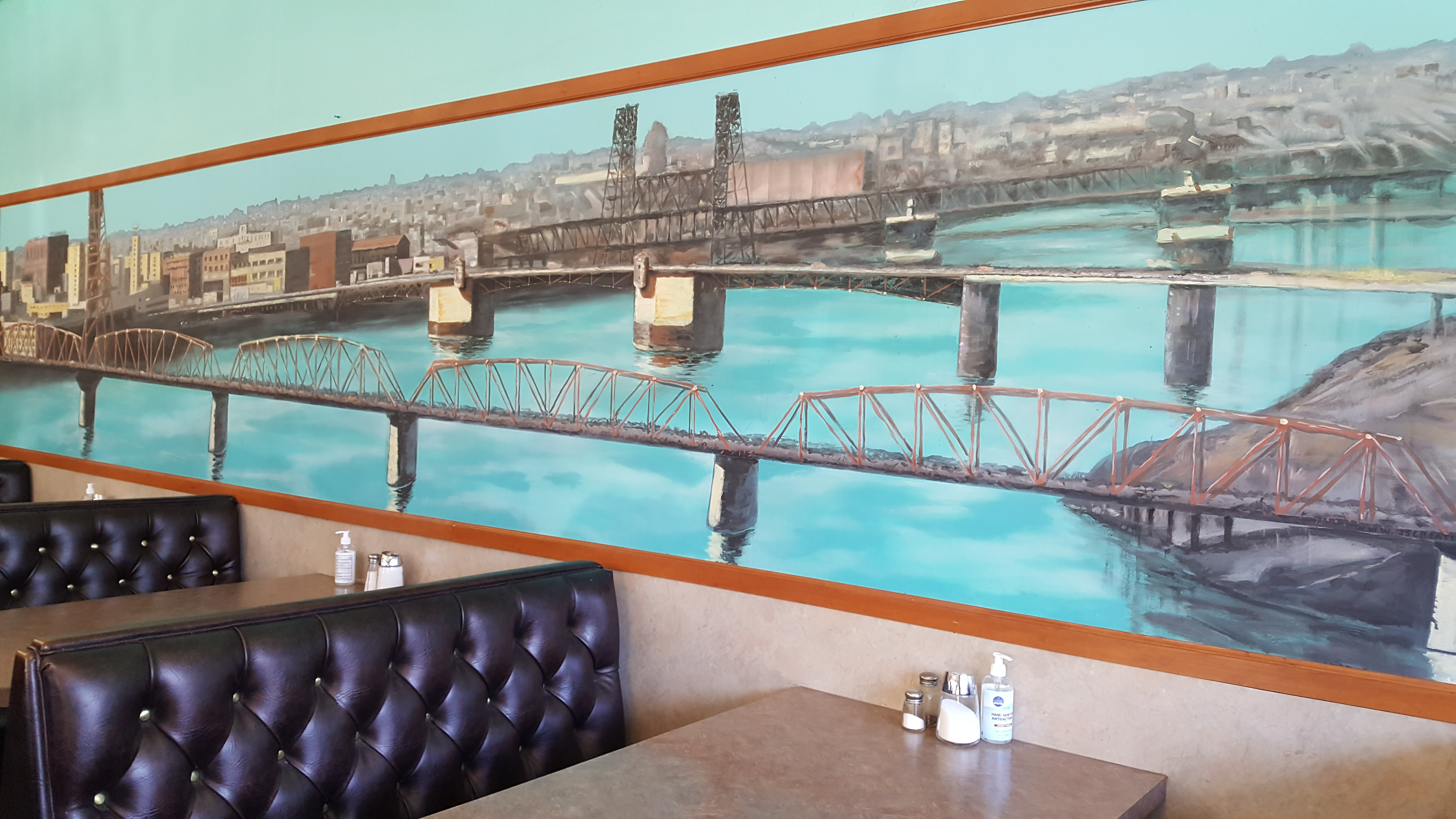
Interior mural, 2022

In 2014, Willamette Week described the Skee-Ball "situation" as "twin 10-foot lanes, 25 cents, no change machine, scoreboard lights are burnt out and wonky". The newspaper said, "Tom's sports bar, like the neighboring Tom's diner, is a throwback to Old Division that's close enough to New Division to make it a relic. The front sidewalk might as well have a smoke machine on it... Malfunctioning scoreboard lights make the lanes all but useless." The Portland Mercury included Tom's in a 2015 list of "wonderfully trashy" happy hours. The newspaper's Brian Yaeger wrote in a 2017 overview of dive bar brunches, "Other upsides include never having to wait in line, a coffee cup that will never hit empty thanks to attentive waitstaff." In 2016, John Vincent of the Business Tribune said, "In many ways, Tom's is like Portland's own Cheers bar." Michael Russell included Tom's in The Oregonian's 2018 list of 15 "favorite" diners in the Portland metropolitan area.

== See also ==
- List of diners
- List of dive bars
