= Raeburn Van Buren =

American cartoonist

- Raeburn Van Buren
- Born: January 12, 1891 Pueblo, Colorado, U.S.
- Died: December 29, 1987 (aged 96) Manhasset, New York
- Areas: Cartoonist, Artist
- Notable works: Abbie an' Slats
- Spouse: Fern (m. 1923; died 1983)

Raeburn Van Buren (January 12, 1891 – December 29, 1987) was an American magazine and comic strip illustrator best known for his work on the syndicated Abbie an' Slats. He was familiarly known in the professional comics community as Ray Van Buren.

== Biography ==
Born in Pueblo, Colorado, Van Buren, a descendant of US President Martin Van Buren, grew up in Kansas City, Missouri. At the Kansas City Star, he learned cartooning from comic strip artist Harry Wood. In 1913, Van Buren moved to New York, where he illustrated for Puck, Life and The Saturday Evening Post.

Van Buren served in the old Seventh Regiment (107th Infantry) of the 27th New York Empire Division in World War I. He was art editor of the division's magazine, Gas Attack. An artistry and illustrative flair were evident in his cartoons, and The New York Times compared his artwork in the magazine with that of the famous British illustrator Bruce Bairnsfather.

After military service, he drew cartoons for The Saturday Evening Post, The New Yorker and Esquire. As a freelance illustrator, he contributed to numerous magazines, including Collier's, Redbook and McCall's. He was a founder of the National Society of Magazine Illustrators.

His brother, Dick Van Buren, wrote the Tarzan comic strip for most of the 1950s, but never achieved the success that Raeburn enjoyed.

=== Abbie an' Slats ===
He began drawing Abbie an' Slats in 1937. The strip followed the experiences of a rural spinster raising her young cousin, a streetwise urban child. It was the idea of Al Capp, who intended to start a second strip to build upon the success of his popular Li'l Abner. Instead of drawing it himself, Capp recruited Van Buren. Initially, Van Buren turned him down, but he was soon lured by the prospect of steady work, as he had just had his first and only child with his wife, Fern. The strip was carried in 400 newspapers but did not equal the popularity of Li'l Abner. Capp abandoned the strip in 1945, turning the writing chores over to his brother, Elliot Caplin. Van Buren stayed on the strip, and it ended with his retirement in 1971.

=== Later life and death ===
Van Buren lived in Great Neck, Long Island. He died in 1987 at North Shore Community Hospital in Manhasset, Long Island, after suffering an injury in a fall. He was 96 years old.

== Awards ==
With the Gold Key Award, he was honored in 1979 as a member of the National Cartoonists Society Hall of Fame. In 1958, he was named "Cartoonist of the Year" by the Quaker City Lodge of the B'nai B'rith in ceremonies at Philadelphia Pa. Previous winners were Al Capp, Milton Caniff, and George Wunder.

== Books ==
Van Buren's wartime experiences are chronicled in the book Duty, Honor, Privilege: New York's Silk Stocking Regiment the Breaking of the Hindenburg Line by his grandnephew Stephen L. Harris. Beginning with Abbie an' Slats and Becky (Saalfield, 1940), his comic strip was collected in several books.

== See also ==
- 107th Infantry memorial
- List of sculptures in Central Park
