= Bill Gallo =

American cartoonist and newspaper columnist

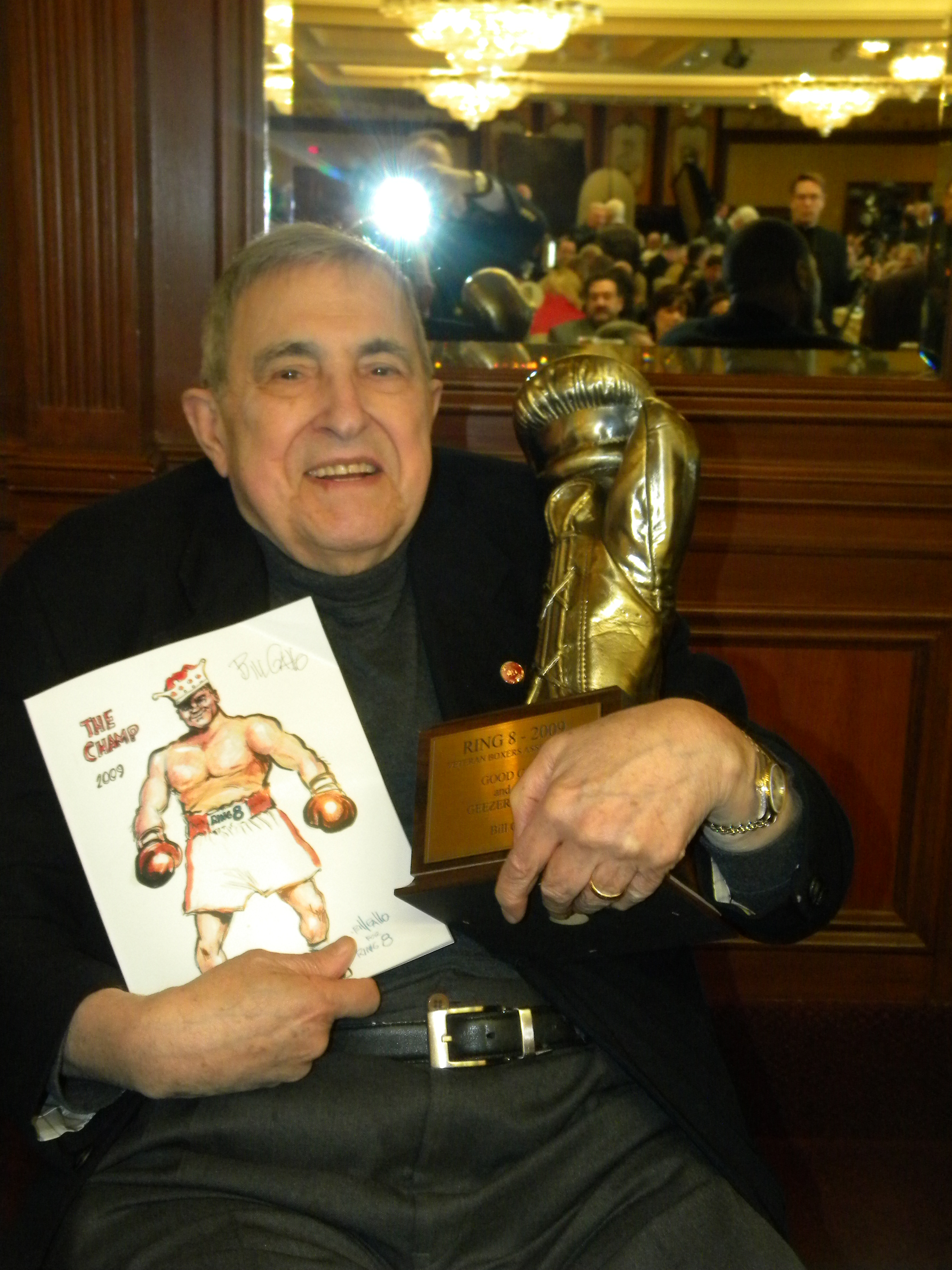
- Bill Gallo accepting a career award at Ring 8 Benefit, January 2010
- Born: December 28, 1922; Manhattan, New York City
- Died: May 10, 2011 (aged 88); White Plains, New York
- Occupations: cartoonist and newspaper columnist

Bill Gallo (December 28, 1922 – May 10, 2011) was an American cartoonist and newspaper columnist, known for his cartoons about sports, for the New York Daily News.

== Biography ==
Gallo was born in Manhattan, the son of a journalist father who died when Gallo was 11 years old. Gallo's mother and father were natives of Spain. When Gallo graduated from high school in 1941, he landed a copy boy job on the Daily News. He worked there for seven months until he was called to serve in World War II.

Gallo joined the United States Marine Corps on December 8, 1942. He completed his recruit training at Parris Island, South Carolina. Gallo served in combat in the Pacific theater, fighting at Saipan, Tinian and on Iwo Jima. After the war, he returned to the Daily News.

Gallo also attended Columbia University and later the Cartoonists and Illustrators School (now known as the School of Visual Arts), under the GI Bill of Rights. In 1960, Gallo was transferred to the Sports Department of the newspaper, where he began doing sports cartoons following the death of cartoonist Leo O'Melia.

Gallo developed the characters Basement Bertha and Yuchie. One of Gallo's more famous works was his 1979 tribute sketch after the death of Yankees baseball great, Thurman Munson.

Gallo's work can also be found on the walls of the Overlook in Midtown Manhattan which is owned by Patrick Evangelista, Mark Evangelista and Jeff Perzan, as well as in the permanent collections of the Baseball Hall of Fame in Cooperstown, New York.

On the night of Tuesday, May 10, 2011, Gallo died from complications stemming from pneumonia. He was 88.

== Awards ==
Columnist–writer
Gallo received the James J. Walker Award (now the Barney Nagler Award) from the Boxing Writers Association of America and the Champions Award from the Downtown Athletic Club. He was also inducted into the International Boxing Hall of Fame.

Cartoonist
He also received the National Cartoonists Society Milton Caniff Lifetime Achievement Award in 1998. Gallo was also awarded the Page One Journalism Award from the New York Newspaper Guild 20 times, the Power of Printing Award, the Elzie Segar Award (as outstanding Cartoonist in 1975), and the Achievement Award for Alumni from the School of Visual Arts. He also received the National Cartoonist Society Sports Cartoon Award for 1968, 1969, 1970, 1972, 1973, 1983, 1984, 1985, 1987, and 1988. In January 2010, Gallo was among the honorees, accepting an award for his boxing writing at the Ring 8 benefit in Howard Beach, New York. The Ring 8 organization awards Bill Gallo college and vocational scholarships annually based on need to aspiring male and female scholars with a boxing background.

On May 7, 2011, he received the Ellis Island Medal of Honor. Due to his health, he was unable to attend the ceremony on Ellis Island. The Daily News honored his medal with a two-page spread that weekend.
