= Hy Eisman =

American cartoonist (1927–2025)

- Born: Hyman Eisman; March 27, 1927 Paterson, New Jersey, U.S.
- Died: March 27, 2025 (aged 98)
- Area: Cartoonist
- Notable works: Little Lulu; Little Iodine; Popeye comic strip The Katzenjammer Kids
- Awards: National Cartoonists Society's Awards (x2)
- Spouses: Adri Abramson (m. 1955; died 1997) Florenz Greenberg (m. 2004; died 2013)
- Children: 2 daughters

Bob Dunn and Hy Eisman's Little Iodine (June 7, 1970)

Hyman Eisman (March 27, 1927 – March 27, 2025) was an American comics artist, best-known for continuing Little Iodine, The Katzenjammer Kids and Popeye.

== Early life ==
Hyman Eisman was born in Paterson, New Jersey, United States on March 27, 1927.

== Comic strips ==
Eisman entered the comic strip field in 1950 and worked on several strips, including Kerry Drake, Little Iodine and Bunny. In comic books, he illustrated various romance comics for Charlton Comics. He was also the last artist doing Little Lulu before it was cancelled in 1984.

From 1986 until 2006 (when the strip went into reruns), he wrote and drew The Katzenjammer Kids. An interview with Eisman on his career appeared in Hogan's Alley #15 (2007).

From 1994 until 2022, he wrote and drew the Sunday strips for Popeye. In December 2008, Eisman re-introduced the character of Bluto to the Popeye Sunday strips, as the twin brother of Brutus.

== Personal life ==
In September 1976, Eisman, who lived in Glen Rock, New Jersey, became a teacher at the Joe Kubert School of Cartoon and Graphic Art, where he taught until May 2019.

Eisman's first marriage was to Nathalie Adrienne "Adri" Abramson, with whom he had two daughters. Adri, his wife of 42 years, died of cancer in the autumn of 1997.

On June 27, 2004, he married Florenz Greenberg, whose husband had also died in 1997. She was the managing editor at CavanKerry Press, a nonprofit publisher of literary works in Fort Lee, New Jersey. Their wedding invitation was a comic strip with Popeye and Olive Oyl. Florenz Greenberg died on October 20, 2013, in Glen Rock.

Eisman had one brother, Morris, who was married to Clarice Roy. Hy's nephews were twins named Michael and David. David had 3 children: Hy's great-nieces, Rebecca and Hilary; and great-nephew, Jonathan (who died in 1997).

Eisman died on March 27, 2025, his 98th birthday.

== Awards ==
Eisman won the 1975 National Cartoonists Society's Award for Best Humor Comic Book Cartoonist (for Gold Key's Nancy comic books). In 1983, he received a National Cartoonists Society Award for his work on the Little Lulu comic book.
