= World Coffee Research =

Agricultural organization

- Abbreviation: WCR
- Formation: 2012
- Type: Non-profit organization
- Purpose: Agricultural research and development
- Headquarters: United States
- Region served: Global
- Fields: Coffee genetics, agronomy, climate resilience
- Key people: Jennifer "Vern" Long (CEO)
- Website: worldcoffeeresearch.org

World Coffee Research (WCR) is a non-profit research and development agricultural organization. The organization was founded with participation or funds from thirty coffee industry groups including the Specialty Coffee Association of America, Green Mountain Coffee Roasters, Peet's Coffee & Tea, Counter Culture Coffee, the coffee importers InterAmerican Coffee, and specialty coffee providers Coffee Bean International.

== Overview ==
WCR was founded in 2012 by plant geneticist Dr. Timothy Schilling. WCR uses research in coffee genetics and agronomy to create new varieties, and advises farmers, among others with respect to the threat of climate change. The current CEO is Vern Long, a plant breeder who formerly served as director of the Office of Agricultural Research & Policy at the U.S. Agency for International Development (USAID).

WCR launched a focused F1 hybrid coffee breeding program in 2015 to develop high-yielding, climate-resilient varieties that also meet specialty coffee quality standards. The program combines multi-year field trials across several countries with large-scale sensory evaluation by international roasters, aiming to shorten the time required to bring improved coffee varieties to market compared with traditional breeding approaches.

In 2022, the Innovea Global Coffee Breeding Network developed by WCR was named one of Time magazine’s Best Inventions for its role in accelerating the development of climate-resilient coffee varieties. Through the initiative, WCR established a global repository of genetic data that enables government-affiliated research institutions to develop more resilient coffee varieties. Once new varieties are identified, participating producing countries can share their findings with other members of the network.

In August 2023, World Coffee Research released an open-access genetic fingerprint database for arabica coffee, designed to enable low-cost and reliable variety authentication using SNP molecular markers. The database, validated with tens of thousands of samples from multiple Latin American countries, is intended to improve quality control in coffee seed systems and reduce economic risks for farmers.

== Collaboration ==
WCR collaborates with local research institutions, coffee organizations, governments, and NGOs to carry out a common research agenda. They also partner with the private sector to aid the uptake of agricultural innovations through the coffee supply chain. Between 2012 and 2018, WCR says it collaborated with 81 partners, including 33 government institutes and research organizations.
