= Scaduto =

Scaduto is an Italian surname. Notable people with the surname include:

- Al Scaduto (1928–2007), American comic strip cartoonist
- Anthony Scaduto (1932–2017), American journalist and writer
- Antonio Scaduto (born 1977), Italian sprint canoeist
