= Bill Crawford (cartoonist) =

American cartoonist

- Born: William Crawford; 1913
- Died: 1982
- Area: Editorial cartoonist

William Crawford (1913–1982) was an American editorial cartoonist.

== Biography ==
Crawford grew up in Hammond, Indiana and graduated from Ohio State University with a degree in Fine Arts and studied for a time in Paris at the Grand Chaumiere. While at Ohio State, he edited the comic magazine Sun Dial.

Crawford worked as a sports cartoonist and for the Washington Daily News and The Washington Post'' from 1936 until 1938. Crawford joined the Newark News as an editorial cartoonist and his cartoons were distributed to more than 700 daily newspapers by the Newspaper Enterprise Association. He was an active member of the National Cartoonists Society, serving as its president and vice-president. In addition to his cartoon work he illustrated more than 20 books, including The Zebra Derby by Max Shulman and Milton Berle's Out of my Trunk.

Crawford retired in 1977 and died of pneumonia on January 6, 1982, in Washington D.C.

== Awards ==
In 1956, 1957, 1958, and 1963 he was awarded "Best Editorial Cartoon" by the National Cartoonist Society, and in 1973 he received their Silver T-Square Award.
