= Little Iodine =

American comic strip (1943–1983)

- Bob Dunn and Hy Eisman's Little Iodine (June 7, 1970)
- Author(s): Jimmy Hatlo (1943–1963); Hy Eisman & Bob Dunn (1967–1985)
- Launch date: August 15, 1943
- End date: August 14, 1983
- Syndicate: King Features Syndicate
- Preceded by: They'll Do It Every Time

Little Iodine is an American Sunday comic strip, created by Jimmy Hatlo, which was syndicated by King Features and ran from August 15, 1943, until August 14, 1983. The strip was a spin-off of They'll Do It Every Time, an earlier Hatlo creation.

== Publication history ==
From August 14, 1943, to February 13, 1966, Little Iodine was written and drawn by Hatlo, who said, "I tried to make her the embodiment of all the brats I knew... I tried to make her naughty as hell—and still likable."

Al Scaduto also contributed to the strip from February 20, 1966, to September 3, 1967, with Hy Eisman and Bob Dunn taking the strip from September 10, 1967, through its end in August 1983. Iodine also appeared in a series of 56 Dell Comics between 1949 and 1962.

Iodine made cameo appearances on October 30, 2022, July 23, 2023, August 13, 2023, and January 28, 2024, in the Popeye Sunday comic strip.

== Characters and story ==
First seen during the 1930s in a supporting role in Hatlo's popular gag panel, They'll Do It Every Time, Little Iodine was the daughter of Henry Tremblechin and his wife, Cora. Her purpose was to serve as a pesky nuisance to the strip's star, Henry, and her behavior caused endless misery for her mild-mannered, easily unsettled father.

However, Iodine proved to be popular in her own right, stealing the strip from her parents, so Hatlo promoted the character into her own strip in 1943. Iodine's antics gave the Sunday comics page a female precursor to Hank Ketcham's Dennis the Menace.

== Film adaptation ==
In 1946, Comet Productions, a company established by Mary Pickford, her husband, Charles Rogers and Columbia executive Ralph Cohn, produced a 56-minute feature film, Little Iodine, starring Hobart Cavanaugh as Henry, Irene Ryan as Cora and Jo Ann Marlowe as Little Iodine. The film was directed by Reginald LeBorg.

In the movie, Iodine thinks that her mother is having an affair with Professor Simkins (Leon Belasco). Consequently, she tries one antic after another to break up the adulterous couple. Her efforts backfire when they cause conflict between Henry and his employer, Mr. Bigdome (Emory Parnell).

Jimmy Hatlo's Little Iodine (November 7, 1948)

The film was scheduled for release earlier than October 20, 1946 (its actual distribution date), but that date was postponed due to an epidemic of polio that prevented children across the United States from attending films. The film is considered a lost film.

== Sources ==
- Strickler, Dave. Syndicated Comic Strips and Artists, 1924-1995: The Complete Index. Cambria, California: Comics Access, 1995. ISBN 978-0-9700077-0-4
