= They'll Do It Every Time =

American comic strip (1929–2008)

- Jimmy Hatlo's They'll Do It Every Time (June 25, 1961)
- Author: Jimmy Hatlo (1929–1963); Al Scaduto (1963–2008)
- Illustrator(s): Jimmy Hatlo (1929–1963); Bob Dunn (1963–1989); Al Scaduto (1989–2007)
- Current status/schedule: Single-panel; concluded
- Launch date: February 4, 1929
- End date: February 3, 2008
- Syndicate(s): King Features Syndicate (1936–2008)
- Publisher: San Francisco Call-Bulletin
- Genre(s): humor, adults
- Followed by: Little Iodine

They'll Do It Every Time was a newspaper comic strip, created by Jimmy Hatlo. It was published for almost eight decades, first appearing on February 4, 1929, and ending on February 3, 2008. The title of the strip became a popular catchphrase.

== Publication history ==
Hatlo, a sports and editorial cartoonist for the San Francisco Call-Bulletin, created the feature to fill space on the comics page when another strip's galleys did not arrive by the publication deadline. Hatlo kept producing the strip as a daily feature, and before long readers were sending fan mail. The feature proved so popular that it was eventually syndicated by King Features Syndicate beginning in 1936. A larger, single vignette Sunday panel was added on July 4, 1943, and ran for six weeks. It was replaced on August 15, 1943 with the Hatlo-produced spinoff Little Iodine. A multiple vignette Sunday panel was introduced on May 8, 1949. By 1950, They'll Do It Every Time was being published in more than 400 newspapers throughout the United States and Canada.

== Characters and story ==
The gags illustrated minor absurdities, frustrations, hypocrisies, ironies and misfortunes of everyday life. These were displayed in a single-panel or two-panel format. If two panels, the first panel would show some deceptive, pretentious, unwitting or scheming human behavior, with the second panel would reveal the truth of the situation.

Regular features of the Sunday installments included Then the Fun Began, Unka Jimmy's Doghouse and Hatlo's History. The most notable of these was The Hatlo Inferno in which annoying individuals would receive hellish comeuppance for their perceived sins and hypocrisies. The Hatlo Inferno was featured throughout 1953 and 1954 and returned for a final run of episodes in 1957. It proved so popular that Avon Books published a paperback collection of the material entitled Hatlo's Inferno.

In its early decades, a timid man named Henry Tremblechin was a recurring victim of the strip's observations. Tremblechin's bratty daughter, Little Iodine appeared so often she graduated into her own comic strip (Aug 15, 1943 – Aug 14, 1983), comic book (1949–62), a 1946 movie and a 1988 animated cartoon show.

== A tip of the Hatlo hat ==
Ideas and gags usually came from suggestions by readers, who were credited with a small acknowledgment box with a tiny drawing of Hatlo tipping his hat. Hatlo continued working on They'll Do It Every Time until his death in 1963 when the team of Al Scaduto and Bob Dunn took over the strip. The readers continued to be credited for their suggestions, but the drawing of the "Hatlo hat" was dropped.

After Dunn's death in 1989, They'll Do It Every Time was written and drawn by Scaduto, who died December 8, 2007, at age 79. King Features announced that the strip would not continue with another cartoonist and ceased publication on February 2, 2008. At the time of Scaduto's death, King Features was distributing the panel to more than 100 American newspapers.

== Awards ==
Al Scaduto's They'll Do It Every Time (March 7, 2007)

The strip, as well as Bob Dunn, received the National Cartoonists Society's Newspaper Panel Cartoon Award for 1968, 1969 and 1979 (with Al Scaduto), plus the Reuben Award for 1975. Al Scaduto won the Newspaper Panel Cartoon Award for 1991 and 1997 for his work on the strip.
