= National Cartoonists Society =

American professional organization

- Formation: March 1, 1946; 80 years ago
- Type: Professional society
- Location: Winter Park, Florida
- Region served: United States
- Members: Professional cartoonists
- President: Karen Evans
- Website: www.nationalcartoonists.com

The National Cartoonists Society (NCS) is an organization of professional cartoonists in the United States. It presents the National Cartoonists Society Awards. The Society was born in 1946 when groups of cartoonists got together to entertain the troops. They enjoyed each other's company and decided to meet on a regular basis.

NCS members work in many branches of the profession, including advertising, animation, newspaper comic strips and syndicated single-panel cartoons, comic books, editorial cartoons, gag cartoons, graphic novels, greeting cards, magazine and book illustration. Only recently has the National Cartoonists Society embraced web comics. Membership is limited to established professional cartoonists, with a few exceptions of outstanding persons in affiliated fields. The NCS is not a guild or labor union.

The organization's stated primary purposes are "to advance the ideals and standards of professional cartooning in its many forms", "to promote and foster a social, cultural and intellectual interchange among professional cartoonists of all types" and "to stimulate and encourage interest in and acceptance of the art of cartooning by aspiring cartoonists, students and the general public."

== History ==
The National Cartoonists Society had its origins during World War II when cartoonists Gus Edson, Otto Soglow, Clarence D. Russell, Bob Dunn and others did chalk talks at hospitals for the USO in 1943. Edson recalled, "We played two spots. Fort Hamilton and Governor's Island. And then we quit the USO." They were lured away by choreographer and former Rockette Toni Mendez. When she learned of these chalk talks, she recruited the cartoonists to do shows for the Hospital Committee of the American Theatre Wing. Beginning with a performance emceed by humor columnist Bugs Baer at Halloran Hospital on Staten Island, these shows were produced and directed by Mendez. The group expanded to junkets on military transport planes, flying to military bases along the southeastern seaboard. On one of those flights, Russell proposed a club to Rube Goldberg and others so the group could still get together after WWII ended. Mendez recalled:

He said, "Everybody has a club or an association or some kind—lumber jacks, undertakers, rug weavers, even garbage collectors—so I don't see why we can't have one, too." All during the flight, Rube kept saying, "No—leave us alone; we're doing fine." C.D. turned to me and he said, "And no girls. Only boys." And he went up and down the aisle of the plane, repeating that this club would be just for boys.

The Society was organized on a Friday evening, March 1, 1946, when 26 cartoonists gathered at 7pm in the Barberry Room on East 52nd Street in Manhattan. After drinks and dinner, they voted to determine officers and a name for their new organization. It was initially known as The Cartoonists Society. Goldberg was elected president with Russell Patterson as vice president, C. D. Russell as secretary and Milton Caniff, treasurer. Soglow was later added as second vice president ("to follow the first vice president around"). Mendez functioned as the Society's trouble-shooter and later became an agent representing more than 50 cartoonists.

The 26 founding members came from the group of 32 members who had paid dues by March 13, including strip cartoonists Wally Bishop (Muggs and Skeeter), Martin Branner (Winnie Winkle), Ernie Bushmiller (Nancy), Milton Caniff, Gus Edson (The Gumps), Ham Fisher (Joe Palooka), Harry Haenigsen (Penny), Fred Harman (Red Ryder), Bill Holman (Smokey Stover), Jay Irving (Willie Doodle), Stan MacGovern (Silly Milly), Al Posen (Sweeney and Son), Clarence Russell (Pete the Tramp), Otto Soglow (The Little King), Jack Sparling (Claire Voyant), Raeburn Van Buren (Abbie an' Slats), Dow Walling (Skeets) and Frank Willard (Moon Mullins).

Also among the early 32 members were syndicated panel cartoonists Dave Breger (Mister Breger), George Clark (The Neighbors), Bob Dunn (Just the Type) and Jimmy Hatlo (They'll Do It Every Time); freelance magazine cartoonists Abner Dean and Mischa Richter, editorial cartoonists Rube Goldberg (New York Sun), Burris Jenkins (New York Journal American), C. D. Batchelor (Daily News) and Richard Q. Yardley (The Baltimore Sun); sports cartoonist Lou Hanlon; illustrator Russell Patterson and comic book artists Joe Shuster and Joe Musial.

More members joined by mid-May 1946, including Harold Gray (Little Orphan Annie) and the Society's first animator, Paul Terry, followed in the summer by letterer Frank Engli, Bela Zaboly (Popeye), Al Capp (Li'l Abner) and Ray Bailey (Bruce Gentry). By March 1947, the NCS had 112 members, including Bud Fisher (Mutt and Jeff), Don Flowers (Glamor Girls), Bob Kane (Batman), Fred Lasswell (Barney Google and Snuffy Smith), George Lichty (Grin and Bear It), Zack Mosley (The Adventures of Smilin' Jack), Alex Raymond (Rip Kirby), Cliff Sterrett (Polly and Her Pals) and Chic Young (Blondie), plus editorial cartoonists Reg Manning and Fred O. Seibel and sports cartoonist Willard Mullin.

Marge Devine Duffy, a secretary in King Features public relations department, had been helping Russell handle correspondence to the NCS, and in 1948, she was installed as the official NCS secretary and later given the title Scribe of the Society. Her name was on all the Society's publications, and her address was the permanent mailing address of the NCS for more than 30 years. As the organizing secretary, she handled agendas, organization and publicity. "She practically ran the damn thing," Caniff recalled. "A real autocrat, and everyone was delighted to have her be an autocrat because that's what we needed."

In the fall of 1949, the NCS cooperated with the Treasury Department to sell savings bonds, embarking in a nationwide tour to 17 major cities with teams of 10 or 12 cartoonists and a traveling display, 20,000 Years of Comics, a 95-foot pictorial history of the comic strip.

Despite the contributions of Duffy and Mendez, there were no female members, as stipulated in the NCS' constitution which specified that "any cartoonist (male) who signs his name to his published work" could apply for membership. In 1949, Hilda Terry wrote a letter challenging that rule, and after more than six months of debates and votes, three women were finally admitted for membership in 1950—Terry, Edwina Dumm and gag cartoonist Barbara Shermund.

On November 6, 1951, 49 members of the NCS arrived at Washington's Carlton Hotel for breakfast with Harry S. Truman. Gathered in Washington to help the Treasury Department sell Defense Stamps, the group presented Truman with a bound volume of their comic strip characters, some interacting with caricatures of Truman.

== USO Tour and charitable causes ==
When Al Posen originated the idea of National Cartoonists Society tours to entertain American servicemen, he became the NCS Director of Overseas Shows. On October 4, 1952, nine cartoonists left on a USO-Camp Shows tour of U.S. Armed Forces installations in Europe, traveling via a Military Air Transport Service plane from Westover Air Force Base in Massachusetts and landing at Rhein-Main Air Base in Germany. On the tour, the cartoonists engaged models in each country to join in their Laff Time show of audience participation stunts and gags. The cartoonists were Posen, Charles Biro, Bob Dunn, Gus Edson, Bill Holman, Bob Montana, Russell Patterson, Clarence Russell and Dick Wingert (Hubert). The comic strip Dondi came about because of a friendship that developed between Edson and Irwin Hasen during a USO trip to Korea.

Hy Eisman described the atmosphere at the NCS when he joined in 1955:

At the time I joined they were meeting at the Lambs Club in New York. It was an actor's club, which was actually a copy of an actor's club in London. When the NCS started, Rube Goldberg, Russell Patterson and Bob Dunn had become very friendly with a lot of actors. Goldberg had even done a couple of movies and Dunn was on early TV doing a program called Quick on the Draw. They had gotten the club to allow them to use the premises as a meeting place for cartoonists. When I joined, they had what they called a Shepherd—after all, the meetings were at the Lambs Club—who was the president, Billy Gaxton. The meetings were monthly, and there would be a dinner afterwards. There was always a lot of drinking going on. For Pete's sake, there was a bar right there in the meeting room. In order to get the meeting going, they would always have to pry the guys away from the bar. The first guy I met, sitting right across from me at my first dinner, was Raeburn Van Buren. He was the creator of Abbie an' Slats, and this was always a strip I liked. What was so nice was that even though he was much older, he just talked to me like a fellow professional. At that first meeting there was Al Capp, Walt Kelly, Alex Raymond, Ernie Bushmiller, Milton Caniff, all of them just sitting there, big as life. As I went to more meetings, I got to talk to a few of them. To me, it was unreal that so many legends were just standing around talking shop and gossip with each other. They were all, so, let's just say, normal. These were guys I had idolized for years.

During the 1960s, cartoonists of military comic strips visited the White House. L to r: Bill Mauldin, Don Sherwood, Mort Walker, Lyndon B. Johnson, Milton Caniff and George Wunder.

During the 1960s, cartoonists of military comic strips went to the White House and met with Lyndon B. Johnson in the Oval Office. The group included Caniff, Bill Mauldin and Mort Walker.

In 1977–78, the National Cartoonists Society released The National Cartoonists Society Portfolio of Fine Comic Art, published by Collector's Press. The portfolio featured a total of 34 art prints. Each 12" x 16" print was printed on archival fine art paper.

In 2011, to memorialize and commemorate the 10th anniversary of the September 11 attacks, many NCS cartoonists auctioned off art that gave commentary to the tragedy and raised money for families victimized by the event in a reflective homage called, Cartoonists Remember. These cartoon tributes raised over $50,000 to benefit the 9/11 families. The art was featured and displayed in both nationally syndicated newspapers and museums across America, including the Newseum in Washington, DC, the Cartoon Art Museum in San Francisco and the Museum of Comic and Cartoon Art in New York City.

In 2005, the Society formed a Foundation to continue the charitable works of its fund for indigent cartoonists, the Milt Gross Fund.

The Society's offices are in Winter Park, Florida. In addition, the NCS has chartered 16 regional chapters throughout the United States and one in Canada. Chapter Chairpersons sit on the NCS Regional Council and are represented by a National Representative, who is a voting member of the Board of Directors. As NCS president for two consecutive terms, Jeff Keane, cartoonist for the Family Circus and son of comic creator, Bil Keane, returned to the charter and spirit of the NCS by extending the society's outreach to the military by visiting and cartooning for vets who served in the Iraq War and Afghanistan War, during the years 2007–2011.

In 2008, NCS joined over 60 other art licensing businesses (including the Artists Rights Society, Association of American Editorial Cartoonists, Society of Children's Book Writers and Illustrators, the Stock Artists Alliance, Illustrator's Partnership of America and the Advertising Photographers of America) in opposing both The Orphan Works Act of 2008 and the Shawn Bentley Orphan Works Act of 2008. Known collectively as "Artists United Against the U.S. Orphan Works Acts", the diverse organizations joined forces to oppose the bills, which the groups believe "permits, and even encourages, wide-scale infringements while depriving creators of protections currently available under the Copyright Act."

== Billy DeBeck Memorial Award ==
The earliest NCS award was the Billy DeBeck Memorial Award, also known as "the Barney" from the character in Billy DeBeck's popular comic strip Barney Google and Snuffy Smith. After DeBeck died on Veteran's Day, 1942, Mary DeBeck remarried (as Mary Bergman) and created the DeBeck Award in 1946. She also made the annual presentation of engraved silver cigarette cases (with DeBeck's characters etched on the cover) to the eight winners spanning the years 1946 to 1953.

Mary Bergman died February 14, 1953, aboard National Airlines Flight 470 which went down in the Gulf of Mexico during a thunderstorm on a flight from Tampa to New Orleans. In 1954, following her death, the DeBeck Award was renamed the Reuben Award, also known "the Reuben". When the award name was changed in 1954, all of the prior eight winners were given Reuben statuettes designed by and named after the NCS' first president, Rube Goldberg. The Reuben Award was executed in bronze by sculptor and editorial cartoonist Bill Crawford.

== Reuben Award ==
The National Cartoonists Society Reuben Award (Note: /ˈruːbən/) started in 1954, as the Billy DeBeck Memorial Award (the "Barney"), now named after Rube Goldberg.

Award weekend is an annual gala event which takes place at a site selected by the President. During the formal, black-tie banquet evening, the Reuben Award (determined by secret ballot) is presented to the Outstanding Cartoonist of the Year. Cartoonists in various professional divisions are also honored with special plaques for excellence. These awards are voted by a combination of the general membership (by secret ballot) and specially-formed juries overseen by various NCS Regional Chapters. A cartoonist does not need to be a member of the NCS to receive one of the Society's awards.

Prior to 1983, the Reuben Awards Dinner was held in New York City, usually at the Plaza Hotel. Since then, the event has expanded into a full weekend and is held in a different city each year. Recent Reuben locations have included New York City; Boca Raton; San Francisco; Cancún; Kansas City, Missouri; Las Vegas; and Pittsburgh, Pennsylvania in 2013.

Each year, during the NCS Annual Reuben Awards Weekend, the Society honors the year's outstanding achievements in all walks of the profession. Excellence in the fields of newspaper strips, newspaper panels, TV animation, feature animation, newspaper illustration, gag cartoons, book illustration, greeting cards, comic books, magazine feature/magazine illustration and editorial cartoons, is honored in the NCS Division Awards, which are chosen by specially-convened juries at the chapter level. An Online Comic Strip Award was added in 2011.

The recipient of the profession's highest honor, the Reuben Award for Outstanding Cartoonist of the Year, is chosen by a secret ballot of the members. As part of the presentations and general frivolity, the NCS has produced videos to initiate the festivities, some of which have been parodies of iconic entertainment.

=== Award winners ===
Billy DeBeck Memorial Award

- 1946: Milton Caniff, Terry and the Pirates
- 1947: Al Capp, Li'l Abner
- 1948: Chic Young, Blondie
- 1949: Alex Raymond, Rip Kirby
- 1950: Roy Crane, Buz Sawyer
- 1951: Walt Kelly, Pogo
- 1952: Hank Ketcham, Dennis the Menace
- 1953: Mort Walker, Beetle Bailey

Reuben Award

- 1954: Willard Mullin, Sports
- 1955: Charles M. Schulz, Peanuts
- 1956: Herbert L. Block (Herblock), Editorial
- 1957: Hal Foster, Prince Valiant
- 1958: Frank King, Gasoline Alley
- 1959: Chester Gould, Dick Tracy
- 1960: Ronald Searle, Advertising and Illustration
- 1961: Bill Mauldin, Editorial
- 1962: Dik Browne, Hi and Lois
- 1963: Fred Lasswell, Barney Google
- 1964: Charles M. Schulz, Peanuts (first repeat winner)
- 1965: Leonard Starr, Mary Perkins, On Stage
- 1966: Otto Soglow, The Little King
- 1967: Rube Goldberg, Humor in Sculpture
- 1968: Pat Oliphant, Editorial, and Johnny Hart, B.C. and The Wizard of Id (first tied winners)
- 1969: Walter Berndt, Smitty
- 1970: Alfred Andriola, Kerry Drake
- 1971: Milton Caniff, Steve Canyon
- 1972: Pat Oliphant, Editorial (second repeat winner)
- 1973: Dik Browne, Hägar the Horrible (third repeat winner)
- 1974: Dick Moores, Gasoline Alley
- 1975: Bob Dunn, They'll Do It Every Time
- 1976: Ernie Bushmiller, Nancy
- 1977: Chester Gould, Dick Tracy (fourth repeat winner)
- 1978: Jeff MacNelly, Editorial
- 1979: Jeff MacNelly, Shoe (fifth repeat winner, first "back-to-back" winner)
- 1980: Charles Saxon, Advertising
- 1981: Mell Lazarus, Miss Peach and Momma
- 1982: Bil Keane, The Family Circus
- 1983: Arnold Roth, Advertising
- 1984: Brant Parker, The Wizard of Id
- 1985: Lynn Johnston, For Better or For Worse (first female (& Canadian) winner)
- 1986: Bill Watterson, Calvin and Hobbes
- 1987: Mort Drucker, Mad
- 1988: Bill Watterson, Calvin and Hobbes (sixth repeat winner)
- 1989: Jim Davis, Garfield
- 1990: Gary Larson, The Far Side
- 1991: Mike Peters, Mother Goose and Grimm
- 1992: Cathy Guisewite, Cathy
- 1993: Jim Borgman, Editorial
- 1994: Gary Larson, The Far Side (seventh repeat winner)
- 1995: Garry Trudeau, Doonesbury
- 1996: Sergio Aragonés, Mad
- 1997: Scott Adams, Dilbert
- 1998: Will Eisner, The Spirit
- 1999: Patrick McDonnell, Mutts
- 2000: Jack Davis, Mad
- 2001: Jerry Scott, Zits and Baby Blues
- 2002: Matt Groening, Life in Hell
- 2003: Greg Evans, Luann
- 2004: Pat Brady, Rose Is Rose
- 2005: Mike Luckovich, editorial cartoonist for The Atlanta Journal-Constitution
- 2006: Bill Amend, FoxTrot
- 2007: Al Jaffee, Mad
- 2008: Dave Coverly, Speed Bump
- 2009: Dan Piraro, Bizarro
- 2010: Richard Thompson, Cul de Sac
- 2011: Tom Richmond, Mad
- 2012: Rick Kirkman, Baby Blues and Brian Crane, Pickles (second tied winners)
- 2013: Wiley Miller, Non Sequitur
- 2014: Roz Chast, editorial cartoonist for The New Yorker
- 2015: Michael Ramirez, editorial cartoonist for Creators Syndicate
- 2016: Ann Telnaes, syndicated with Cartoonists and Writers Syndicate/New York Times Syndicate
- 2017: Glen Keane, Walt Disney feature films
- 2018: Stephan Pastis, Pearls Before Swine
- 2019: Lynda Barry, Making Comics
- 2020: Ray Billingsley, Curtis
- 2021: Edward Sorel, cartoonist and satirist
- 2022: Bill Griffith, Zippy the Pinhead
- 2023: Hilary B. Price, Rhymes with Orange
- 2024: Mark Parisi, Off the Mark
- 2025: Mark Tatulli, Liō

== Other awards ==
=== Ace (Amateur Cartoonist Extraordinary) Award ===
- 1961 Arne Rhode
- 1962 Carol Burnett
- 1963 Hugh Hefner
- 1963 Jonathan Winters
- 1964 Chuck McCann
- 196? Cliff Arquette
- 1967 Jackie Gleason
- 1970 Orson Bean
- 1972 Bobby Day
- 1973 Robert Lansing
- 1974 Jane Powell
- 1975 Rita Moreno
- 197? Boyd Lewis
- 1979 Linda Gialeanella
- 1980 Ginger Rogers
- 1981 Claire Trevor
- 1990 John Updike
- 1991 Al Roker
- 1992 Tom Wolfe
- 1993 Pete Hamill
- 1996 Denis Leary
- 1998 Morley Safer
- 2014 "Weird Al" Yankovic
- 2018 Jake Tapper

=== Award of Honor ===
This award was for recognition of the American cartoon as an instrument in war, peace, education and in the artistic betterment of our cultural environment. On September 22, 1965, the following were honored:

- General Omar N. Bradley
- Walter Cronkite
- John C. Daly
- John Cameron Swayze

=== Gold Key Award (National Cartoonists Society Hall of Fame) ===
- 1977 Hal Foster
- 1978 Edwina Dumm
- 1979 Raeburn Van Buren
- 1979 Herbert Block
- 1980 Rube Goldberg (posthumous)
- 1981 Milton Caniff
- 2000 Arnold Roth
- 2005 Larry Katzman
- 2006 Mort Walker
- 2008 Bil Keane
- 2009 Mell Lazarus
- 2010 Bill Gallo
- 2011 Roy Doty
- 2012 Stan Goldberg
- 2013 Bunny Hoest & John Reiner
- 2021 Mort Gerberg
- 2024 Russell Myers

=== Milton Caniff Lifetime Achievement Award ===
The Milton Caniff Lifetime Achievement Award is awarded by unanimous vote of the NCS Board of Directors.

- 1994 Harry Devlin
- 1994 Will Eisner
- 1995 Al Hirschfeld
- 1996 Jack Davis
- 1997 Dale Messick
- 1998 Bill Gallo
- 1999 Charles M. Schulz
- 2002 Jerry Robinson
- 2003 Morrie Turner
- 2004 Jules Feiffer
- 2005 Gahan Wilson
- 2006 Ralph Steadman
- 2007 Sandra Boynton
- 2008 Frank Frazetta
- 2009
  - Joe Kubert
  - George Booth
- 2010 R. O. Blechman
- 2012 Brad Anderson
- 2013 Russ Heath
- 2015 Paul Coker, Jr.
- 2016 Angelo Torres
- 2017 Lynda Barry
- 2018 Floyd Norman
- 2019 Hy Eisman

=== Gold T-Square Award ===
The Gold T-Square is awarded for 50 years as a professional cartoonist.

- 1955 Rube Goldberg
- 1999 Mort Walker
- 2018 Arnold Roth
- 2020 Garry Trudeau
- 2024 Bill Hinds

=== Silver T-Square Award ===
The Silver T-Square is awarded, by unanimous vote of the NCS Board of Directors, to persons who have demonstrated outstanding dedication or service to the Society or the profession.

- 1948 David Low
- 1949
  - Carl Ed
  - Cliff Sterrett
  - H.C. "Bud" Fisher
  - Frank King
  - George McManus
- 1950
  - Harry S. Truman
  - John Snyder
  - James Berryman
  - Martin Branner
- 1951 Red Manning
- 1953 Ed Kuekes
- 1954
  - Dwight D. Eisenhower
  - George M. Humphrey
  - Herbert Block
- 1956
  - James Thurber
  - Gluyas Williams
  - Al Posen
  - Al Pierotti
- 1957
  - Harry Hershfield
  - Tom Little
  - Milton Caniff
  - Bob Dunn
- 1958 Russell Patterson
- 1959
  - Carl Rose
  - Bill Mauldin
- 1960
  - Ben Roth (posthumous)
  - McGowan Miller
- 1961
  - Mort Walker
  - Joe Musial
- 1962 Edmund Valtman
- 1963 Steve Douglas
- 1964
  - Tom Gill
  - Vernon Greene
- 1967 Al Smith
- 1969
  - Otto Soglow
  - Irwin Hasen
  - Dick Ericson
- 1970
  - Alfred Andriola
  - George Wunder
- 1971
  - Dick Hodgins Sr.
  - Frank Fogarty
- 1972
  - Walt Kelly
  - John Norment
  - David Pascal
  - Larry Katzman
- 1973
  - Bill Crawford
  - John Fischetti
  - Jack Tippit
- 1974
  - Isadore Klein
  - "Tack" Knight
- 1975
  - Jack Rosen
  - Hal Foster
- 1976 Al Kilgore
- 1977
  - Bill Kresse
  - Paul Szep
  - Lyman Young
- 1978
  - Bill Gallo
  - Jim Ruth
  - Hank Ketcham
- 1979
  - Dick Hodgins Jr.
  - Sylvan Byck
  - Ed Mitchell
  - Jim Ivey
- 1980 Buck Peters
- 1981 John Cullen Murphy
- 1982 George Wolfe
- 1984 Sam Norkin
- 1986 Lee Falk
- 1992
  - Creig Flessel
  - Herb Jacoby
- 1993 George Breisacher
- 1995 Arnold Roth and Caroline Roth
- 1996
  - David Folkman
  - Bill Janocha
- 1997 Tim Rosenthal
- 1998 Joe Duffy
- 2000 Mel Lazarus
- 2001
  - Ted Goff
  - Frank Pauer
- 2002
  - Bil Keane
  - Joseph D'Angelo
- 2003
  - Jud Hurd
  - John McMeel
- 2004 (no award)
- 2005 Dick Locher
- 2006 Joe and Luke McGarry
- 2007 Stu Rees
- 2008 James Kemsley (posthumous)
- 2009 Jeff Bacon
- 2010 Lucy Caswell (for involvement in the Billy Ireland Cartoon Library & Museum)
- 2011 Steve McGarry
- 2012 Lee Salem
- 2014 Jeff Keane
- 2015 Bruce Higdon
- 2018
  - Brendan Burford
  - Rick Stromoski
- 2018 John Glynn
- 2022 Jeannie Schulz
- 2023 Brian Walker

=== Elzie Segar Award ===
This award was presented to a person who made a unique and outstanding contribution to the profession of cartooning. The winner was selected by the NCS Board and later by King Features Syndicate, in honor of "Popeye" creator Elzie Segar.

- 1971 Milton Caniff
- 1972 Otto Soglow
- 1973 Dik Browne
- 1974 Russell Patterson
- 1975 Bob Dunn
- 1976 Bill Gallo
- 1977 Mort Walker
- 1978 Hal Foster
- 1979 Al Capp (posthumous)
- 1980 Charles M. Schulz
- 1981 Johnny Hart
- 1982 Bil Keane
- 1983 John Cullen Murphy
- 1984 Fred Lasswell
- 1985 Jim Davis
- 1986 Brant Parker
- 1987 Mike Peters
- 1994 Fred Lasswell
- 1996 Tom Armstrong
- 1999 Mort Walker
- 2022 Patrick McDonnell

=== No. 1 (Sports Personality of the Year) Awards ===
- 1968 Ralph Houk
- 1970 Gil Hodges
- 1971 Jack Dempsey and Joan Whitney Payson (tie)
- 1972 Leroy "Satchel" Paige
- 1974 Rocky Graziano
- 1974 Monte Irwin
- 197? Casey Stengel
- 19?? Pearl Bailey
- 19?? Yogi Berra
- 19?? Dave DeBusschere
- 19?? Reggie Jackson
- 19?? Willis Reed
- 1984 Phil Rizzuto

== Presidents ==
- 1946–1948 Rube Goldberg
- 1948–1949 Milton Caniff
- 1950–1952 Alex Raymond
- 1952–1953 Russell Patterson
- 1953–1954 Otto Soglow
- 1954–1956 Walt Kelly
- 1956–1957 Harry Devlin
- 1957–1959 John Pierotti
- 1959–1960 Mort Walker
- 1960–1961 Bill Crawford
- 1961–1963 Bill Holman
- 1963–1965 Dik Browne
- 1965–1967 Bob Dunn
- 1967–1969 Jerry Robinson
- 1969–1971 Al Smith
- 1971–1973 Jack Tippit
- 1973–1977 Bill Gallo
- 1977–1979 Burne Hogarth
- 1979–1981 John Cullen Murphy
- 1981–1983 Bil Keane
- 1983–1985 Arnold Roth
- 1985–1987 Frank Evers
- 1987–1988 Bill Hoest
- 1988 Bill Rechin
- 1988–1989 Lynn Johnston
- 1989–1993 Mell Lazarus
- 1993–1995 Bruce Beattie
- 1995–1997 Frank Springer
- 1997–1999 George Breisacher
- 1999–2001 Daryl Cagle
- 2001–2005 Steve McGarry
- 2005–2007 Rick Stromoski
- 2007–2011 Jeff Keane
- 2011–2015 Tom Richmond
- 2015–2019 Bill Morrison
- 2019–2023 Jason Chatfield
- 2023- Karen Evans

== See also ==
- Allan Holtz
- Billy Ireland Cartoon Library & Museum
- Daily comic strip
- Fred Waring Cartoon Collection
- List of comic strip syndicates
- List of newspaper comic strips
- National Cartoonist Day
- Sunday strip
- Cartoon Art Museum
