= Moon Mullins =

American comic strip, 1923-1991

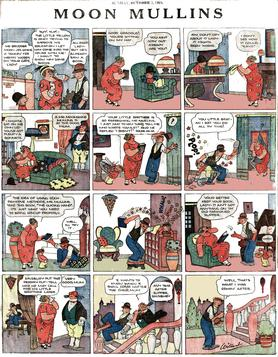
- Frank Willard's Moon Mullins (October 5, 1924)
- Author(s): Frank Willard, Ferd Johnson
- Current status/schedule: Concluded
- Launch date: June 19, 1923
- End date: June 2, 1991
- Syndicate(s): Chicago Tribune Syndicate
- Publisher(s): Dover Publications, Whitman Publishing, Cupples & Leon
- Genre: Humor

Moon Mullins is an American comic strip which had a run as both a daily and Sunday feature from June 19, 1923, to June 2, 1991. Syndicated by the Chicago Tribune/New York News Syndicate, the strip depicts the lives of diverse lowbrow characters who reside at the Schmaltz (later Plushbottom) boarding house. The central character, Moon (short for Moonshine), is a would-be prizefighter—perpetually strapped for cash but with a roguish appetite for vice and high living. Moon took a room in the boarding house at 1323 Wump Street in 1924 and never left, staying on for 67 years. The strip was created by cartoonist Frank Willard.

== Origins and history ==
Frank Henry Willard was born on September 21, 1893, in Anna, Illinois, the son of a physician. He determined to become a cartoonist early in life. After attending the Academy of Fine Arts in Chicago in 1913, he was a staff artist with the Chicago Herald (1914–18), where he drew the Sunday kids' page Tom, Dick and Harry and another strip, Mrs. Pippin's Husband. He next wrote and drew The Outta Luck Club for King Features Syndicate (1919–23).

In The Comics (1947), Coulton Waugh described Willard's art style as "gritty-looking". In 2003, the Scoop newsletter documented the 1923 events that led to the creation of the strip:

Moon was a tough-talking, if generally good natured, kind of guy who took (and dealt) plenty of punches during his run. And actually, those are very appropriate characteristics. See, back before Moon was created, Frank Willard was working on a strip called The Outta Luck Club for King Features Syndicate. That's when he got the notion that some of his ideas were being slipped to fellow cartoonist George McManus (creator of Bringing Up Father). So, in typical Moon Mullins fashion, Willard approached McManus and gave him a wallop that knocked the latter out cold and got the former fired. That little episode didn't stop Captain Joe Patterson's interest from being piqued, however, and Willard soon set to work on a new strip for the Chicago Tribune Syndicate. That strip was Moon Mullins ...

Ah, Moon Mullins! He made a horrible role model but a hilarious star nonetheless—as did his assorted pals ... Adventures included stints in jail, trysts with stolen cars, failed employment opportunities, misunderstandings and plenty of black eyes for all. Yet, there was a certain lightness to all of Moon's debaucheries that made his low-down ways pretty charming ...

Willard was in tune with the working class characters he created, as noted by David Westbrook in From Hogan's Alley to Coconino County: Four Narratives of the Early Comic Strip:

Some comic strip artists laid claim to a similar working-class authenticity by representing themselves in the position of employee. When Frank Willard, author of Moon Mullins, narrates a scene from his workplace, he portrays himself as a rowdy underdog much like The Yellow Kid. He becomes, in effect, the "tricky and roguish" character cited by Gilbert Seldes as the quintessence of the comic strip.

I worked for a syndicate manager once who got everybody in the place together once a week and jumped on a desk and gave us 'pep talks.' He didn't give us ideas, but, oh boy, how worn out we were after those pep talks. The guy that applauded the loudest got the most money, and I didn't get much—as he found out who it was who gave him the bird!|30|30|Frank Willard, as related to Martin Sheridan

When Brennecke (in "The Real Mission of the Funny Paper" by Ernest Brennecke, from The Century Magazine, March 1924) locates the truth of comic strip realism in the comics' habit of "commenting trenchantly" on "the life of the middle classes," it is comics like The Yellow Kid and artists like Willard that he has in mind...

== Characters and story ==
- Moon Mullins: With his big eyes, plaid pants, perpetual cigar and yellow derby hat, Moon is an amiable roughneck. He haunts saloons, racetracks and pool halls, mangles the English language with Jazz Age slang, and gets into endless scrapes looking for an easy buck or a hot dame. Moon himself is a low-rent but likeable sort of riff-raff, involved in get-rich schemes and bootleg whiskey, crap games and staying out all night with disreputable friends. None of the roughhousing was fatal or even particularly threatening, however. Indeed, the gentleness of the situational humor behind all the characters' rough edges kept the strip on an even keel. The name "Moonshine" referenced Mullins as a drinker and gambler during Prohibition.
- Kayo: Moon's street urchin kid brother, who sleeps in an open dresser drawer. Kayo is usually clad in suspenders, polka dot pants and a black derby. Pint-sized Kayo (a play on "K.O.," sportswriters' shorthand for a knockout punch) is wise beyond his years and even a bit of a cynic. His plain-speaking, matter-of-fact bluntness is a frequent source of comedy.

Moon Mullins #2 (February–March 1948) displayed reprints of the comic strip.

- Emmy (Schmaltz) Plushbottom: the nosy, lanky, spinsterish landlady who likes to put on airs. She finally married on October 6, 1933, and became Lady Plushbottom. She says "My stars" and "For pity sakes" a lot, but her trademark line—always delivered after a (frequent) putdown—is "I'll smack your sassy face!"
- (Uncle) Willie: Introduced in 1927, Moon's long lost, no-account uncle wears a checkered suit and is perpetually unshaven. Willie, who would disappear for months at a time, prefers the hobo life—despite being married and half-domesticated. His only occupation seems to be the avoidance of physical labor and confrontations with his formidable wife, Mamie.
- (Aunt) Mamie: Miss Schmaltz's burly, no-nonsense washwoman and cook. Her rolled-up sleeves reveal a conspicuous star tattoo. She's the only featured character of the working class cast who actually works. Mamie is usually tolerant of her errant husband, but she can be dangerous when riled—much to Willie's dismay.
- Lord Plushbottom: (a.k.a. "Plushie," as Moon calls him.) Willard introduced him because Patterson thought tossing a well-bred Englishman into that shabby crowd had great comic possibilities. Plushbottom initially appeared as a man of wealth, whom Emmy pursued for 10 years before their marriage. Afterward he moved in, in apparently reduced circumstances, but never discarded his evening clothes, spats and top hat for everyday wear.
- Egypt: Emmy's beautiful flapper niece with the bobbed Louise Brooks coiffure, and Moon's sometime girlfriend.
- Mushmouth: Moon's pal and much-maligned step-and-fetch-it.
- Kitty Higgins: the star of Willard's "topper" strip about a precocious little girl and her maid, Pauline. Kitty eventually joined the Moon Mullins cast as Kayo's girlfriend.

After Johnson took over, other characters were added to the cast, including:

- Professor Byrrd: an erudite, tweed-suited academic
- Myna Byrrd: the Professor's lovely brunette daughter
- Miss Swivel: a sexy blonde stenographer, frequently pursued by Moon
- Mr. Doodle: an eccentric, temperamental artist
- Joke: a cab driver

The strip was reviewed by Dr. Hermes in Dr. Hermes Retro-Scans:

It was never so hysterical that you felt you just had to clip it and show it to everyone you knew, but Moon Mullins was always enjoyable and funny in a low-key way. Frank Willard's art was better than it's given credit for, very smooth and subtle; but his real strength was in the amusing personalities he gave his characters. (Longtime assistant Ferd Johnson took over after Willard's death in 1958.) "Moonshine" Mullins, as his name hinted, was a shady sort of rogue, always in trouble and often in jail. His little brother Kayo was a tough guy in a derby and turtleneck; everyone remembers him as the kid who slept in a pulled-out dresser drawer. Running the boarding house was sour ol' Emmy Schmaltz (she later married insubstantial Englishman Lord Plushbottom.) Rounding out the continuing cast were the cook Mamie and her less than industrious husband Willie. Moon Mullins is not likely to be adapted into the new big Broadway musical (although you never know), but I always liked it and would like to see it remembered.

— 30, 30

The Sunday page's topper strip, Kitty Higgins, ran from December 14, 1930, to 1973.

== Later years ==
Ferd Johnson's Moon Mullins (January 3, 1959)

Ferdinand "Ferd" Johnson (1905–1996) began as Willard's assistant a few months after the strip began in 1923. Starting with the lettering, then the backgrounds, Johnson gradually progressed to the point where he was handling the entire operation; but it was only after Willard's death that he began signing it. When Willard died suddenly on January 11, 1958, the Tribune Syndicate hired Johnson to helm the strip. Johnson's first credited strip ran on March 3, 1958. (Frank Willard's tombstone at the Anna Cemetery in Anna, Illinois, is graced with an engraving of Moon Mullins.)

Ferd Johnson was born December 18, 1905, in Spring Creek, Pennsylvania. Johnson became interested in cartooning after winning the Erie (Pennsylvania) Dispatch-Herald cartoon contest at the age of 12. After finishing high school in 1923 he attended the Chicago Academy of Fine Arts, but left school after only three months to take an assistant's job at the Chicago Tribune with Willard. While assisting on Moon Mullins, Johnson remained active with other Tribune projects. He created several comic strip features for the Syndicate—Texas Slim (1925–1928) and Lovey-Dovey (1932)—did sports illustration work, and produced advertising cartoons. In 1940, he revived Texas Slim in Texas Slim and Dirty Dalton (with the companion strip, Buzzy), which ran for 18 years.

By the time he took Moon Mullins, it had evolved from long story continuities to a gag-a-day strip. In 1978, Ferd's son, Tom Johnson, signed on as his assistant. Ferd Johnson stayed with the strip until it came to an end upon his retirement in 1991.

Frank Willard's Moon Mullins (March 3, 1942)

== Decline and end ==
Moon Mullins appeared in 350 papers at its height but declined to 50. Johnson said, "They just kept dropping off because it's so damn old. The new ones come out and the editors want to make room for them, so the old ones get dumped. And Moon sure qualifies that way." In April 1991, the Chicago Tribune dropped the strip, and the Tribune Media Syndicate told Johnson that it was the end. The last strip ran on Sunday, June 2, 1991.

== Licensing and promotion ==
=== Comic books and reprints ===
The strip was reprinted in a long-running series of Cupples & Leon books (1927–1937), Big Little Books and comic books for Dell Comics (starting in 1936) and later, the American Comics Group (1947–1948). Dover Publications reprinted a collection of the daily strips in 1976, consisting of the third and fifth Cupples & Leon books. Representative samples of Moon Mullins daily continuity were featured in Great Comics Syndicated by the Daily News-Chicago Tribune (Crown Publishers, 1972), and The Smithsonian Collection of Newspaper Comics (Smithsonian Institution Press/Harry Abrams, 1977). The latter volume also reproduces several full-color Sunday pages. Comic strip historian Bill Blackbeard (1926–2011) edited a series of strip reprints for SPEC Productions.

=== Moon Mullins merchandise ===
Moon Mullins merchandising began when agent Toni Mendez arranged a licensing deal for Kayo suspenders. The wave of products that followed included such items as a series of Kellogg's Pep Cereal pins, a Milton Bradley board game (1938), salt and pepper shakers, perfume bottles, Christmas lights, bisque toothbrush holders, a set of German nodder figures, carnival chalkware statues, a wind-up toy handcar, oilcloth and celluloid Kayo dolls, coloring books and a series of jigsaw puzzles (1943).

=== Kayo Mullins chocolate drink ===
Kayo Chocolate Drink was the name of a bottled, later canned, chocolate-flavored milk drink. Created in 1929 by Aaron D. Pashkow of Chicago, it was bottled under authority of Chocolate Products, manufactured for decades, and featured Kayo Mullins on its label. It is now only sold as a powdered hot chocolate mix distributed by Superior Coffee and Tea and Smucker Foodservice Canada for the foodservice market.

=== Radio ===
In 1973, the Moon Mullins radio program was issued on this LP produced by George Garabedian for Mark 56 Records. The sleeve notes were by radio historian Jim Harmon.

Moon Mullins was adapted for radio during the 1940s. In the third episode of the series (March 25, 1940), the Plushbottoms trade Moon's only suit to pay for a collect telegram and learn they are owners of a goldmine. In a CBS audition recording dated January 31, 1947, Uncle Willie asks Moon for $10 bail, and Moon teaches the game of Blackjack to Kayo. Lord Plushbottom plans to go to a costume party as an Indian but instead winds up with a suit of armor. Character actor Sheldon Leonard was in the cast.

=== Animation ===
Cambria Studios produced two sample episodes of a proposed Moon Mullins syndicated TV series with their Syncro-Vox animation process in the early 1960s, but it did not clear enough television stations to go into production. Comic actor and director Howard Morris was the voice of Moon when the strip was adapted to animation for Archie's TV Funnies (1971–1973), produced by Filmation. Moon and Kayo became one of several rotating segments on the Saturday morning cartoon series. Other comic strip character features in the rotation included Broom-Hilda, Dick Tracy, The Captain and the Kids, Alley Oop, Nancy and Sluggo and Smokey Stover. It was repeated in 1978, without Archie, under the title Fabulous Funnies.

== See also ==
- List of Milton Bradley Company products

== Sources ==
Milton Bradley marketed this board game in 1938.

- Strickler, Dave. Syndicated Comic Strips and Artists, 1924-1995: The Complete Index. Cambria, California: Comics Access, 1995. ISBN 0-9700077-0-1
- Harvey, Robert C. The Art of the Funnies: An Aesthetic History. (Jackson: University Press of Mississippi, 1994), esp. pp. 97–98.
