= Abbie an' Slats =

American comic strip

- Raeburn Van Buren's Abbie an' Slats (April 14, 1956)
- Author: Al Capp (1937–1945); Elliot Caplin (1945–1971)
- Illustrator: Raeburn Van Buren
- Current status/schedule: Concluded
- Launch date: July 6, 1937
- End date: January 30, 1971
- Syndicate(s): United Feature Syndicate
- Genre(s): Humor, satire, politics

Abbie an' Slats is an American comic strip which ran from July 12, 1937, to January 30, 1971, initially written by Al Capp and drawn by Raeburn Van Buren. It was distributed by United Feature Syndicate.

== Publication history ==
Abbie an' Slats was Capp's idea; he intended to start a second strip after the success of his popular Li'l Abner. Instead of drawing it himself, Capp recruited well-established freelance magazine illustrator Van Buren. Initially, Van Buren turned down Capp's offer, but he was lured by the prospect of steady work.

The strip was widely syndicated to 400 newspapers, but it never equalled the popularity of Li'l Abner. Capp abandoned the strip in 1945, turning the writing chores over to his brother Elliot Caplin. Van Buren continued to draw the strip, taking on Andy Sprague as an assistant in 1947.

Abbie an' Slats continued for 34 years, until Van Buren retired in 1971. The National Cartoonists Society named him to their Hall of Fame in 1979.

== Characters and story ==
In 1937, the story began with stubborn, street-wise Aubrey Eustace Scrapple, aka Slats, recently orphaned in New York. He moved by train to the small town of Crabtree Corners, where he was met by his older cousin, the spinster Abigail Scrapple, aka Abbie. Slats joined the household that also included Abbie's sister, the prim and proper Sally.

Slats made an enemy of skinflint Jasper Hagstone when he drove into Hagstone's limousine while trying to avoid running over a dog. However, Hagstone's daughter, Judy, became the object of Slats' affection. Later, Becky Groggins became Slats' sweetheart. Becky's father, J. Pierpont "Bathless" Groggins, eventually became the central character of the Sunday strip.

Abbie an' Slats daily (January 23, 1945)

== Archives ==
Van Buren's work from 1954 to 1968 (160 items) is kept at the Syracuse University Library's Special Collections Research Center.

== Raeburn Van Buren and Abigail Van Buren ==
In 1984, Van Buren sent a gift to "Dear Abby" columnist Abigail Van Buren (Pauline Phillips). She wrote back on November 30, 1984, thanking him and then commented on the name similarity:

Yes, I remember our meeting very well. I also recall that every once in a while we'd get our mail mixed up... I at one time (when I first began, I spelled my name "ABBIE"... Then it became even more confusing because of the VAN BUREN... remember?) Abbie and Slats... and the Van Buren. I selected my own name... so perhaps it was an unconscious choice, with you in mind all the while. Be well, Darling One... and stay well. And I hope to heaven you're dangerous!

== Reprints ==
Most books collecting vintage comic strips suffer a loss in reproduction because clippings from newspapers are the usual source, but two Abbie an' Slats books displayed a higher quality because they were compiled from original proof sheets by publisher Ken Pierce.
