= Boyd's Coffee =

American coffee company

Boyd's Coffee Company
- Logo
- Trade name: Boyd's
- Type: Subsidiary
- Industry: Coffee
- Founded: 1900 in Portland, Oregon, U.S.
- Fate: Acquired
- Headquarters: Portland, Oregon, U.S.
- Area served: United States
- Products: Coffee
- Owner: Royal Cup
- Parent: Farmer Brothers

Boyd's Coffee Company is an American coffee company founded in 1900 in Portland, Oregon. Boyd's is known primarily for their wholesale operations, providing coffee products and machines to convenience stores and grocery stores.

In 2016, the company was sold to Farmer Brothers, based in Texas. On May 5, 2026, Farmer Brothers was sold to Royal Cup. In 2018, Boyd's announced plans to lay off 230 employees, and close operations in Eugene and Portland, Oregon, its home.

== See also ==
- List of coffee companies
