= Ferd Johnson =

American cartoonist

Ferd Johnson self-portrait

Ferdinand Johnson (December 18, 1905 – October 14, 1996), usually cited as Ferd Johnson, was an American cartoonist, best known for his 68-year stint on the Moon Mullins comic strip.

== Biography ==
Johnson was born December 18, 1905, in Spring Creek, Pennsylvania, and had a younger brother, George. Johnson's youthful interest in cartooning had the support of his family after he won an Erie Dispatch Herald cartoon contest. He recalled in 1989, "I think I was 11 years old. And then I won a newspaper cartoon drawing contest, and I think the prize was two or three tickets to Peck's Bad Boy, and that got my dad to thinking, and he gave me a $28 correspondence course. I went through that and worked on the high school yearbook all the time. I did lots of drawings there. At 13, I sold my first cartoon for money to a railroad magazine. It paid me $10 a month for years and years."

After graduating from high school in 1923, he attended the Chicago Academy of Fine Arts for three months. When Moon Mullins creator Frank Willard taught briefly there, Willard invited the talented youngster to visit his workplace, the Chicago Tribune. Johnson recalled, "I stood around there for hours watching him work. He finally turned around and said, 'Ferd, if you're going to hang around here all this time, I'm going to put you to work.' So I got a job as assistant at 15 bucks a week. I wrote home, and I said, 'Don't send me any more money. I've got it made." Johnson dropped out of school and became Willard's assistant, two months after the latter launched Moon Mullins in 1923. Johnson worked at the Tribune as a color artist and sports illustrator.

While Johnson was still in his teens, the paper offered him the opportunity to create his own comic strip. Johnson's effort, Texas Slim, about a ranch hand working for the antihero Dirty Dalton, debuted as a Sunday page from the Tribune Syndicate on August 30, 1925. It ran three years, until February 12, 1928. Starting October 4, 1931, Johnson revived Texas Slim as a topper strip paired with his short-lived domestic-comedy strip Lovey Dovey. The topper lasted until September 11, 1932; Lovey Dovey held on until September 25, 1933. On April 7, 1940, the characters returned once again as a Sunday strip titled Texas Slim & Dirty Dalton, which ran through 1958. This strip had its own topper, Buzzy, which ran from 1943 to 1953.

Willard and Johnson traveled to Florida, Maine and Los Angeles, doing Moon Mullins while living in hotels, apartments and farmhouses. At its peak of popularity during the 1940s and 1950s, the strip ran in 350 newspapers. According to Johnson, he had been doing the strip solo for at least a decade before Willard's death on January 11, 1958. "They put my name on it then", Johnson said in 1989. "I had been doing it about 10 years before that because Willard had heart attacks and strokes and all that stuff. The minute my name went on that thing and his name went off, 25 papers dropped the strip. That shows you that, although I had been doing it 10 years, the name means a lot."

After Willard's death, the Chicago Tribune New York News Syndicate hired Johnson as Willard's logical successor, and he began signing the strip. Johnson recalled that, ''Texas [Slim & Dirty Dalton] ran until 1958 when I took over Moon completely. Up to then I was working on both Moon and Texas and some advertising work, and taking some time off to eat and sleep."

He stayed with the strip until it concluded in June 1991. In 1978, his son, Tom Johnson, signed on as his assistant (drawing the Sunday page and assisting on the dailies). Ferd Johnson worked on Moon Mullins for 68 years, a stint that comics historian Don Markstein calls "probably the longest in the history of American comics."

Johnson continued to draw and paint after he moved into a retirement home in Irvine, California in 1995, and he died 15 months later. Doris, his wife of 57 years, whom he met in art school in Chicago, died in 1986.

== Awards ==
Ferd Johnson received a ComicCon International Inkpot Award in 1993.
