= Frank Willard =

American cartoonist (1893–1958)

- Willard in 1931
- Born: Frank Henry Willard; September 21, 1893; Anna, Illinois, U.S.
- Died: January 11, 1958 (aged 64); Los Angeles, California, U.S.
- Other names: Dok Willard
- Occupation: Cartoonist
- Known for: Moon Mullins

Frank Henry Willard (September 21, 1893 – January 11, 1958) was an American cartoonist best known for his syndicated newspaper comic strip Moon Mullins which ran from 1923 to 1991, working alongside assistant Ferd Johnson. He sometimes went by the nickname Dok Willard.

== Early years ==
As a youth, Willard dropped out of several schools. In addition to jobs at county fairs, he worked in a mental institution. In 1909, he moved with his family to Chicago. He went to Union Academy, where he illustrated the Reflector yearbook in 1912. After attending the Academy of Fine Arts in Chicago in 1913, he was a cartoonist with the Chicago Herald (1914–18), where he drew the Sunday comic strips Tom, Dick and Harry and Mister and Mrs. Pippen/Mrs. Pippin's Husband and a daily comic strip which used various titles. At the Herald, he got to know cartoonists E. C. Segar and Billy DeBeck, of Popeye and Barney Google fame respectively.

== WWI ==
Entering the U.S. Army in 1917, Willard served with the American Expeditionary Force in France (1918–19). "Our unit built roads and did no fighting," he said. Unemployed on his return, he was given a place to stay by DeBeck and worked briefly on DeBeck's Barney Google and Snuffy Smith in 1920. Through DeBeck's influence, he landed a job that year in the King Features Syndicate bullpen where he did just "about everything but carry water for the elephants." He next wrote and drew The Outta Luck Club for King Features (1919–23), where he also substituted for cartoonist Jean Knott on his Penny Ante poker panel.

== Moon Mullins ==
In 1923, Joseph Patterson of the Chicago Tribune-New York News Syndicate wanted a lowlife strip to compete with Barney Google. The curious chain of events that brought Willard, Patterson and Moon Mullins together began because Willard and other King Features cartoonists had to show their planned panels in advance to the King editor, who usually rejected Willard's ideas. Willard was angry, but he exploded when he saw some of his gags surface in George McManus' Bringing Up Father. As Willard's assistant Ferd Johnson recalled:

The editor was feeding Willard's ideas to the Syndicate's big star. Later Willard and McManus were very good friends, but at the time, Willard got so damn sore that he went and had a couple of drinks and then went after the editor. He found the guy sitting in his chair, and he let him have one that knocked him onto the floor. Willard knew he'd get fired for that—and he did. But the story got around, and when Captain Patterson, who was looking for a tough guy strip, heard about it, he said, "That's my man." He called Willard in. And that's how Moon got its start.

== Moon merchandising ==
Moon Mullins quickly became popular after it was launched as a daily on June 19, 1923. A few months later, Ferd Johnson signed on as Willard's assistant, eventually doing a great deal of the work. The success of the strip enabled Willard to spend much time on his avocation, golf. Johnson recalled, "We'd go to Florida and follow the golf guys all the way to Maine." With Florida as a home base, Willard worked out of hotel rooms in Los Angeles, North Carolina, Maine and Wisconsin. At least one summer, the two mailed in their comic strips from Mexico.

Meanwhile, the strip expanded to 250 newspapers, a radio program, a Milton Bradley game, two Big Little Books and a comic book. Willard and Johnson also did the topper strip Kitty Higgins. Characters in toppers sometimes turned up in the main strip, such as Kitty Higgins joining the cast of Moon Mullins and Herby appearing in Smitty.

Frank Willard was one of the first members of the National Cartoonists Society, joining two weeks after it was founded in 1932. With his health declining, Willard had little to do with the strip in his last years. After Willard's death in 1958, Johnson continued Moon Mullins until 1991, when it came to an end.
