= Jimmy Hatlo =

American cartoonist

- Born: James Cecil Hatlo; September 1, 1897 East Providence, Rhode Island, US
- Died: December 1, 1963 (aged 66)
- Area: Cartoonist
- Notable works: They'll Do It Every Time
- Awards: National Cartoonists Society's Newspaper Panel Cartoon Award, 1957 and 1959; Silver Lady Award

Damon Runyon wrote the foreword for this hardcover Jimmy Hatlo collection published by David McKay in 1943.

James Cecil Hatlo (September 1, 1897 – December 1, 1963), better known as Jimmy Hatlo, was an American cartoonist who in 1929 created the long-running comic strip and gag panel They'll Do It Every Time, which he wrote and drew until his death in 1963. Hatlo's other strip, Little Iodine, was adapted into a feature-length movie in 1946.

In an opinion piece for the July 22, 2013, edition of The Wall Street Journal, "A Tip of the Hat to Social Media's Granddad", veteran journalist Bob Greene characterized Hatlo's daily cartoons, which credited readers who contributed the ideas, as a forerunner of Facebook and Twitter. Greene wrote: "Hatlo's genius was to realize, before there was any such thing as an Internet or Facebook or Twitter, that people in every corner of the country were brimming with seemingly small observations about mundane yet captivating matters, yet lacked a way to tell anyone outside their own circles of friends about it. Hatlo also understood that just about everyone, on some slightly-below-the-surface level, yearned to be celebrated from coast to coast, if only for a day."

== Biography ==
Hatlo was born in East Providence, Rhode Island, on September 1, 1897. His father, James M. Hatlow, a printer, was an immigrant from the Orkney Islands of Scotland. The original spelling of the family name became an inconvenience when, as a budding sports cartoonist, Hatlo fashioned a trademark signature with the "H" drawn as stylized goal posts and the "o" as a descending football. He shrank the "w" into a small apostrophe in the signature but otherwise dropped it entirely.

=== Early years ===
When he was a small child, the family moved to Los Angeles. As a young man, Hatlo began doing incidental artwork and engravings for local newspapers during an era when halftone reproduction of photographs was still limited.

=== World War I ===
When the United States entered World War I, Hatlo went to Kelly Field, hoping to become an aviator despite his poor eyesight. Instead he became a Spanish flu casualty and missed the war entirely.

He relocated to San Francisco following the war and worked for both the San Francisco Call & Post and the San Francisco Evening Bulletin. The two papers later merged as the San Francisco Call-Bulletin, part of William Randolph Hearst's publishing empire. Hatlo at first drew "travelogues" for automobile advertising. These illustrated maps promoted auto travel (and thus auto sales). On the strength of his talent, he soon managed to work his way into editorial cartooning and then sports cartooning. His sports cartoon for the Call-Bulletin was Swineskin Gulch.

=== Tip of the Hatlo hat ===
His break came when a shipment of panels from syndicated cartoonist Tad Dorgan failed to arrive in the mail. Hatlo was pressed into service to create something to fill the space. What resulted was They'll Do It Every Time, an instant hit with San Francisco readers. After several days, he began to run short on ideas. Various people—including Pat Frayne, Hatlo's managing editor at the time, and Scoop Gleason, his sports editor—later claimed credit for what happened next; even so, it may have been Hatlo himself, to adopt the tactic of asking readers to submit their own ideas for the cartoons. Whatever the source, this gambit was a huge success. Hatlo picked the best submissions, and credited each contributor by name, in closing the such cartoon with a box that read, "Thanx and a tip of the Hatlo Hat to...", followed by the submitters's name.

=== The Hatlo Inferno ===
The Hatlo inferno

Jimmy Hatlo caricatured himself in this self-portrait.

They'll Do It Every Time became a fixture in the Call-Bulletin. It soon caught the attention of Hearst and was picked up by Hearst's King Features Syndicate. His supplemental panel, The Hatlo Inferno, which depicted life in Hell, ran in tandem with They'll Do It Every Time for five years (1953–58).

=== Books ===
Hatlo's first They'll Do It Every Time collection, a 100-page softbound book, was published in 1939 by David McKay Company of Philadelphia. It was followed in the 1940s by two McKay hardcover collections. Avon paperback collections of They'll Do It Every Time followed throughout the 1950s. In his foreword to the 1943 McKay collection, Damon Runyon wrote that years earlier he had unsuccessfully tried to persuade the New York American to lure Hatlo away from San Francisco, adding:

It is my opinion, that Hatlo is today one of the greatest cartoonists the newspaper business has ever produced. Certainly he is one of the most human, and humanness is the element that makes a great cartoonist... Hatlo's forte is mirroring every day people. He has marvelous insight into the minds and souls of folks we all know. He has a great ear for the common speech of the day. He knows our men and women as they are in their homes, in the street and under all conditions, the result of mingling with them and rubbing elbows with them. Hatlo pictures people as they are, not as they ought to be, or as he imagines them... I have known the work of all the great cartoonists of the past 30 odd years in the newspaper business—I have known many of them personally, though that is not germane to an appraisal of their work, and I believe that Jimmy Hatlo rightly belongs in the first rank with them. I believe, too, that his cartoons represent a contribution to the entertainment of the American people at this time that is unsurpassed in any field.

=== Popularity ===
Hatlo's success also attracted imitators, and a rival syndicate (McClure Newspaper Syndicate) launched a clone cartoon by Harry Shorten and Al Fagaly titled There Oughta Be a Law!.

After World War II, Hatlo settled in Carmel-by-the-Sea, California, where he became part of a cartoonist community that included such artists as Gus Arriola, Frank O'Neal, Eldon Dedini and Hank Ketcham.

At their peak, Hatlo's cartoons appeared in over 400 newspapers worldwide. Little Iodine, a spin-off comic strip featuring a mischievous little girl who had become one of Hatlo's stock characters, even got her own series of comic books and a 1946 movie adaptation. Hatlo's popularity was at its highest in the early 1950s. He was profiled in a 1952 feature article in The Saturday Evening Post titled "He Needles the Human Race."

Jimmy Hatlo endorsement print ad (1954)

== Personal life and death ==
Hatlo was a lifelong smoker, who once appeared in magazine and newspaper ads for Lucky Strike cigarettes, his favorite brand. He was troubled in his later years by atherosclerosis. In late November 1963, Hatlo was hospitalized for a kidney condition. He died of a stroke early on December 1, 1963, at the age of 66.

== Awards and cultural references ==
Hatlo was recognized for his work with the National Cartoonists Society's Newspaper Panel Cartoon Award for 1957 and 1959. The Banshees gave Hatlo their Silver Lady Award.

The Canadian cartoonist Seth reminisced about Hatlo's work in his graphic novella It's a Good Life, If You Don't Weaken.

The 2016 centennial of Carmel-by-the-Sea celebrated Hatlo as one of the noted cartoonists who were part of the town's history.

Hatlo had moved with his wife and young son from Carmel to neighboring Pebble Beach in 1953, taking with him the name he had given to his house on Monte Verde Street—"Wit's End"—and transferring it to his new home on the 17 Mile Drive. The Monte Verde Street home was subsequently bought by Tom McCrea, brother of actor Joel McCrea, and converted into a small hotel, the Tally Ho Inn.

== Bibliography ==
- They'll Do It Every Time, David McKay: 1943.
- They'll Do It Every Time Book Number Two, David McKay: 1945.
- They'll Do It Every Time, pocket book, Pocket: 1945.
- They'll Do It Every Time, paperback edition, Avon: 1951.
- Little Iodine, coloring book, Whitman: 1951.
- The New Jimmy Hatlo Book, Avon: 1952.
- Jimmy Hatlo—Calendar for 1954, comics, King Features: 1954.
- Brand New Cartoons by Jimmy Hatlo, Avon: 1955.
- Cartoons by Jimmy Hatlo, Avon: 1955.
- Hatlo Cartoons, Avon: 1956.
- Little Iodine, Dell: 1955.
- Another New Jimmy Hatlo Book, Avon: 1957
- Jimmy Hatlo's Office Party, Grosset & Dunlap: 1957.
- Little Iodine: All Brand-New Stories, Dell: 1957.
- More They'll Do It Every Time, Avon: 1957.
- The Newest Jimmy Hatlo Book, Avon: 1959.
- Office Hi-Jinks, Avon: 1961.
