= Farmer Brothers =

American coffee foodservice company

Farmer Bros. Co.
- Trade name: Farmer Brothers
- Type: Public
- Traded as: Nasdaq: FARM; Russell 2000 Component
- Industry: Foodservice
- Founded: California (1912; 114 years ago)
- Founder: Roy E. Farmer
- Headquarters: Irving, Texas, U.S.
- Number of locations: 80 (2024 investor presentation)
- Area served: U.S.
- Key people: David Pace (chairman of the board); John Moore (president, CEO, director); Vance Fisher (CFO)
- Products: Coffee • Tea • Spices • Culinary Goods
- Revenue: US$500.9 million (FY 2023)
- Net income: US$ 12.1 million (FY 2014)
- Number of employees: 1,000
- Website: farmerbros.com

Farmer Bros. Co. is an American coffee foodservice company based in Fort Worth, Texas. The company specializes in the manufacture and distribution of coffee, tea, and approximately 300 other foodservice items used by restaurants and other establishments. John Moore serves as the company's president and chief executive officer.

== Company history ==
In 1912, Roy E. Farmer started a small business roasting coffee beans and selling them door-to-door in Los Angeles, California. Following a decade of success, the company was incorporated in 1923 and expanded into the coffee equipment business through the acquisition of Western Urn Manufacturing. As the company grew, it opened branch locations throughout California and quickly established a notable presence in San Francisco. Beginning in the 1930s, Farmer Brothers diversified its product offerings to include a wider range of foodservice items in addition to coffee and coffee equipment. By 1939, the company was roasting and selling more than 3 million pounds of coffee annually.

In 1942, the Farmer Brothers plant retooled to support the war effort, with female machinists producing highly technical parts and equipment to supply the military. In 1949, the company opened a 20-acre, state-of-the-art headquarters and production facility in Torrance, California, increasing its sales to more than 14 million pounds of coffee a year.

When Roy E. Farmer died unexpectedly in 1951 at the age of 59, his son, Roy F. Farmer assumed control of the company. Estate taxes on his father's estate forced the younger Farmer to sell a portion of the company's stock to the public in the months that followed. Its shares trade on the NASDAQ market under the symbol FARM. As Roy F. settled in, the company kept costs down and built an efficient distribution network, sustaining high profit margins. The company expanded its portfolio to include herbs, spices and seasonings in 1963 and launched its Office Coffee Division in 1972, before expanding nationwide in 1988.

In the following years of Roy F. Farmer's tenure as chairman, chief executive officer and president, the company reached a peak of $240 million in sales in 1998. By 1998, however, he served only as chairman and CEO, with his son Roy E. Farmer holding the office of president and chief operating officer. At that point, the company had nearly 100 branches in 29 states in the western United States. At the same time, however, the company became mired in shareholder unrest. Shareholders demanded greater transparency into the company's operations and strategy, wanted executives to open up dialogue with Wall Street analysts, and sought to add independent directors to the board. Despite this, the company remained fairly private and closed to the public.

At the time of Roy F. Farmer's death in 2004, following a more than 50-year stint heading the company, his son Roy E. Farmer had recently succeeded him as president and chief executive officer and become chairman of the board.

Roy E. Farmer died unexpectedly in January 2005 at the age of 52, after which Guenter Berger was appointed interim chief executive officer. Roger M. Laverty III later became chief executive officer and president. During his tenure, Farmer Brothers acquired Coffee Bean International and its Panache brand in Portland, Oregon, in 2007 and the direct store delivery coffee business of Sara Lee in 2009. The latter acquisition was reported to be worth $45 million. Laverty served until April 2011, when Jeffrey Wahba (treasurer and chief financial officer) and Patrick Criteser (president and chief executive officer of Coffee Bean International) were appointed interim co-chief executive officers by the board.

Farmer Brothers established its first Direct Trade partnership in 2010 and opened its Public Domain Coffee House in Portland, Oregon. The company celebrated its 100th anniversary in 2012 and appointed Michael Keown as its new chief executive officer and president in March of that year. Keown came to the company from WhiteWave Foods, a subsidiary of Dean Foods Company. Then on April 15, 2013, Farmer Bros. appointed Mark Nelson as its new CFO.

On April 28, 2015, Farmer Brothers announced the move of its headquarters from Torrance, California to Northlake, Texas and expanded its Project D.I.R.E.C.T. initiative in Nicaragua.

In 2016, Farmer Brothers acquired China Mist Tea and Boyd's Coffee and West Coast Coffee shortly thereafter in 2017. The company expanded its Project D.I.R.E.C.T. initiative to Brazil in 2018. Deverl Maserang was appointed chief executive officer and president in September 2019 and Scott Drake as CFO in March 2020. It launched its Revive Equipment Service & Restoration, entered into a partnership with High Brew Coffee and opened a more than 150,000-square-foot West coast distribution center in Rialto, California in 2021. It sold its direct ship business in June 2023 to Treehouse Foods. In the same month, Farmer Brothers announced the sale of its Northlake, Texas, coffee facility and non-direct-store-delivery coffee business to TreeHouse Foods for $100 million. The transaction was completed in July 2023.

John Moore was named president and CEO in February 2024.

In February 2025, the company launched a direct-to-consumer e-commerce platform, allowing customers to purchase its coffee, tea and spice products online for home delivery.

In March 2025, Farmer Brothers launched Sum>One Coffee Roasters, its first specialty coffee brand, expanding its portfolio beyond traditional and premium coffee products.

In March 2026, Royal Cup Coffee and Tea agreed to acquire Farmer Brothers in an all-cash transaction valued at $1.29 per share, subject to shareholder approval and customary closing conditions. The acquisition was completed in May 2026 after approval by Farmer Brothers shareholders. Farmer Brothers was taken private and its common stock ceased trading on the Nasdaq Global Select Market.

== Public Domain Coffee ==
The acquisition of Coffee Bean International by Farmer Brothers was part of the company's expansion into "specialty coffee". As an outgrowth of that initiative, Public Domain was established in April 2010. A subsidiary of Farmer Brothers, Public Domain is the company's flagship coffeehouse which also serves as a lab and training facility for their baristas. The establishment is nationally recognized and is located in downtown Portland, Oregon (as is the headquarters of Coffee Bean International). In what some reviewers have dubbed a "cautiously designed corporate coffeehouse for high-quality coffee", Farmer Brothers showcases its "top shelf" coffees.
