= Cartoonist =

Visual artist who makes cartoons

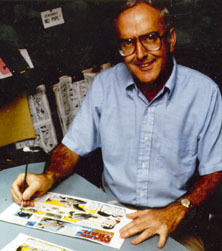
- Cartoonist Jack Elrod at work on a Sunday page of the Mark Trail comic strip

Occupation
- Occupation type: Art profession

Description
- Fields of employment: Publishing
- Related jobs: Editorial cartoonist Comics creator

A cartoonist is a visual artist who specializes in both drawing and writing cartoons (individual images) or comics (sequential images). Cartoonists differ from comics writers or comics illustrators/artists in that they produce both the literary and graphic components of the work as part of their practice.

Cartoonists may work in a variety of formats, including booklets, comic strips, comic books, editorial cartoons, graphic novels, manuals, gag cartoons, storyboards, posters, shirts, books, advertisements, greeting cards, magazines, newspapers, webcomics, and video game packaging.

== Terminology ==
A cartoonist's discipline encompasses both authorial and drafting disciplines (see interdisciplinary arts). The terms "comics illustrator", "comics artist", or "comic book artist" refer to the picture-making portion of the discipline of cartooning (see illustrator). While every "cartoonist" might be considered a "comics illustrator", "comics artist", or a "comic book artist", not every "comics illustrator", "comics artist", or a "comic book artist" is a "cartoonist".

Ambiguity might arise when illustrators and writers share each other's duties in authoring a work.

== History ==
=== Editorial cartoons ===
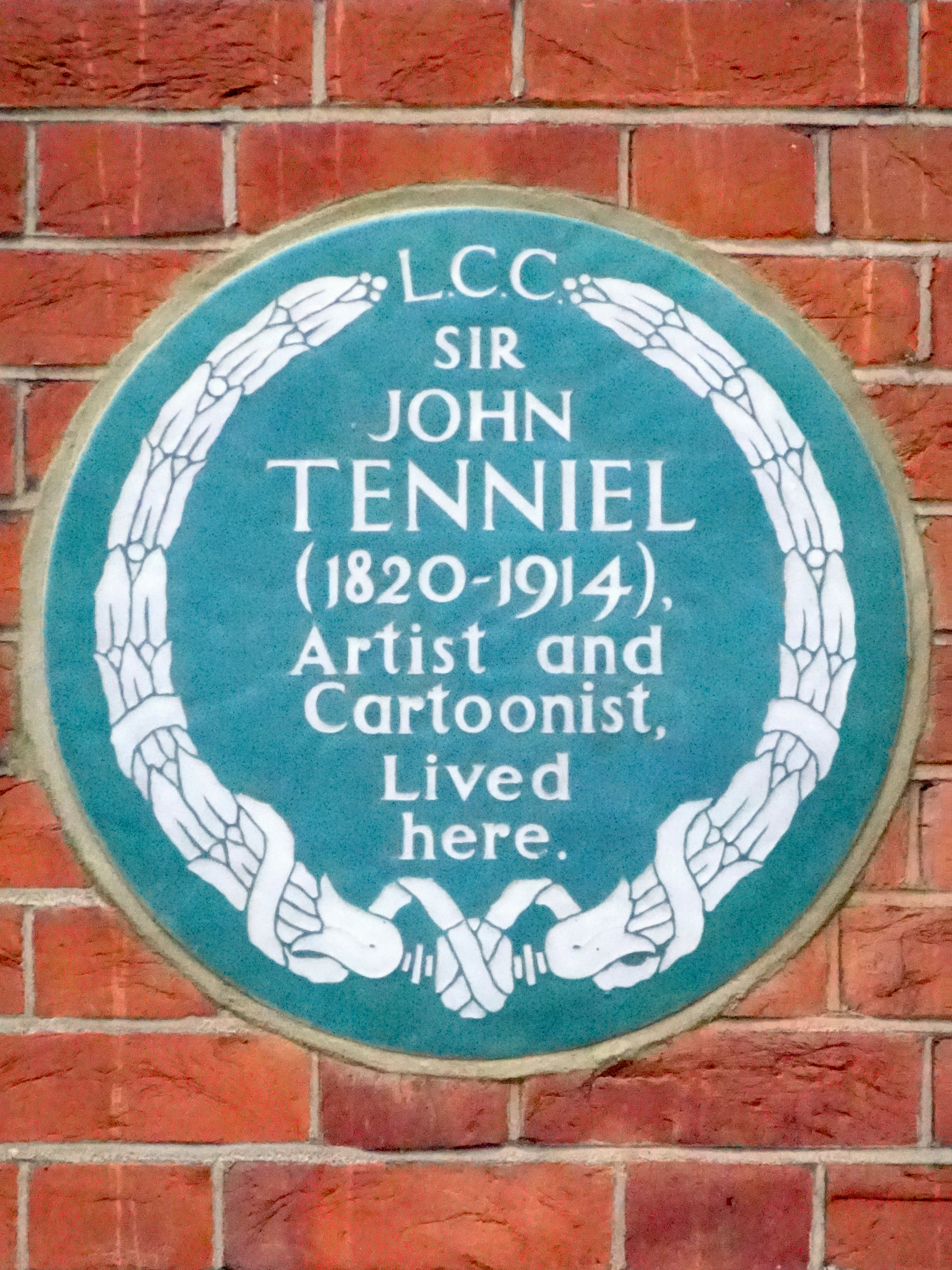
Sir John Tenniel, chief cartoonist for Punch (from 1864) and the illustrator of Alice in Wonderland, was the first cartoonist to be knighted

The English satirist and editorial cartoonist William Hogarth, who emerged in the 18th century, poked fun at contemporary politics and customs; illustrations in such style are often referred to as "Hogarthian". Following the work of Hogarth, editorial/political cartoons began to develop in England in the latter part of the 18th century under the direction of its great exponents, James Gillray and Thomas Rowlandson, both from London. Gillray explored the use of the medium for lampooning and caricature, calling the king (George III), prime ministers and generals to account, and has been referred to as the father of the political cartoon. Emerging in 1841, Punch magazine coined the term "cartoon" in its modern sense as a humorous illustration. Artists at Punch included John Tenniel who, from 1850, contributed over two thousand cartoons over 50 years.

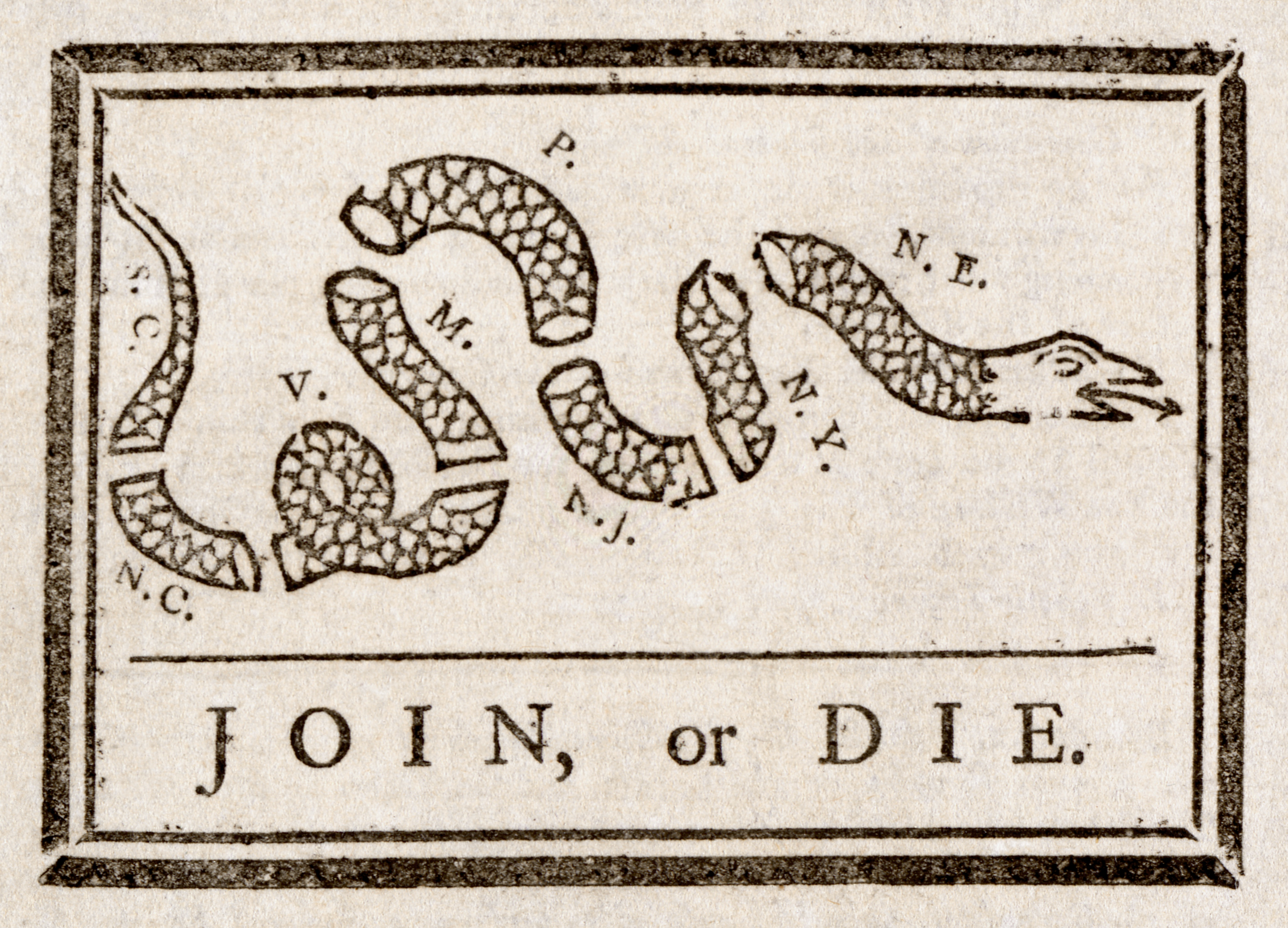
Benjamin Franklin's Join, or Die (May 9, 1754), credited as the first cartoon published in an American newspaper

==== U.S. cartoonists ====
While never a professional cartoonist, Benjamin Franklin is credited with the first cartoon published in The Pennsylvania Gazette on May 9, 1754: Join, or Die, depicting the American colonies as segments of a snake. In the 19th century, professional cartoonists such as Thomas Nast, whose work appeared in Harper's Weekly, introduced other familiar American political symbols, such as the Republican elephant.

=== English comic literature ===
Illustrated humorous newspapers were popular in Britain as early as the 19th century, the earliest of which was the short-lived The Glasgow Looking Glass in 1825. The most popular was Punch, which popularized the term cartoon for its humorous caricatures. Sometimes these cartoons in these newspapers appeared in sequences; the character Ally Sloper appeared in the earliest serialized comic strip when the character appeared in his own weekly newspaper in 1884.

=== Comic strips ===
Comic strips received widespread distribution to mainstream newspapers by syndicates.

Calum MacKenzie, in his preface to the exhibition catalog, The Scottish Cartoonists (Glasgow Print Studio Gallery, 1979) defined the selection criteria:

The difference between a cartoonist and an illustrator was the same as the difference between a comedian and a comedy actor—the former both deliver their own lines and take full responsibility for them, the latter could always hide behind the fact that it was not his entire creation.

Many strips were the work of two people although only one signature was displayed. Shortly after Frank Willard began Moon Mullins in 1923, he hired Ferd Johnson as his assistant. For decades, Johnson received no credit. Willard and Johnson traveled about Florida, Maine, Los Angeles, and Mexico, drawing the strip while living in hotels, apartments and farmhouses. At its peak of popularity during the 1940s and 1950s, the strip ran in 350 newspapers. According to Johnson, he had been doing the strip solo for at least a decade before Willard's death in 1958: "They put my name on it then. I had been doing it about 10 years before that because Willard had heart attacks and strokes and all that stuff. The minute my name went on that thing and his name went off, 25 papers dropped the strip. That shows you that, although I had been doing it ten years, the name means a lot."

== See also ==
- Comics creator
- Daily comic strip
- Editorial cartoonist
- Female comics creators
- Glossary of comics terminology
- List of cartoonists
- List of newspaper comic strips
- List of manga artists
- Mangaka
- Penciller
- Sunday comics
- Sunday strip
- Webcomic

Societies and organizations

- Association of American Editorial Cartoonists
- Association of Illustrators
- Cartoonists Rights Network International
- Indian Institute of Cartoonists
- National Cartoonists Society
- Society of Illustrators of Los Angeles
- Society of Children's Book Writers and Illustrators
- Society of Illustrators
- Society of Illustrators of Los Angeles
