= 1974 in comics =

Notable events of 1974 in comics.

== Events and publications ==
=== January ===
- January 1: In Le journal de Tintin, the first chapter of the Michel Vaillant story Des Filles et des Moteurs, by Jean Graton is published, in which Michel Vaillant and Françoise Latour marry.
- January 20: In the Disney comics magazine Topolino, the first episode of the Donald Duck story Paperino e la visita distruttiva is published, the first story realized by the team of Giorgio Pezzin (writer) and Giorgio Cavazzano (cartoonist).
- January 24: In Pilote, René Pétillon's comic series Jack Palmer makes its debut. It will run in various magazines until 2013.
- January 25–27: Francis Groux, Jean Mardikian, Claude Moliterni organize the first edition of the Angoulême International Comics Festival in Angoulême, France.
- The Demon, with issue #16, is cancelled by DC.
- Doc Savage: The Man of Bronze, with issue #8, is cancelled by Marvel.
- In Italy, the first issue of Alter linus (Milano libri), a supplement to Linus, dedicated to the adventure comics is published; debut also of the erotic series Maghella (Ediperiodici) and of the series Pinocchio (Bianconi).
- In the Italian magazine Linus, the first chapter of the Corto Maltese story Corto Maltese in Siberia by Hugo Pratt is published. This long narrative will reach its conclusion in July 1977.
- Chinook, by Derib, first album of Buddy Longway
- The Adventures of Alix story Le prince du Nil by Jacques Martin is published.

=== February ===
- February 17: In Corriere dei ragazzi, the first episode of Silver’s Lupo Alberto is published.
- February 21: The final episode of Machiko Hasegawa's Sazae-san is published.
- February 28:
  - The Flemish comics magazine Pats, a weekly children's supplement of the newspapers Het Nieuwsblad, De Standaard, Het Handelsblad, De Gentenaar and De Landwacht, changes its name to the Patskrant. It will run until 23 August 1977, after which its becomes the Stipkrant.
  - Inside the new Pats, Gommaar Timmermans' children's comic Jonas en de Wonderwinkel is published, which will run until 3 September 1974.
- Adventure Comics #431: Spectre feature begins by writer Michael Fleisher and artist Jim Aparo. It runs through issue #440.
- Superboy and the Legion of Super-Heroes #200: "The Legionnaire Bride of Starfinger" by Cary Bates and Dave Cockrum.
- With issue #18 (February /March cover date), DC Comics' Mister Miracle (1971 series) goes on hiatus.
- Hero for Hire, with issue #17, changes its name to Power Man.
- Special Marvel Edition, with issue #16, is cancelled by Marvel; its numbering continues with Master of Kung Fu (April).
- The Punisher makes his first appearance in The Amazing Spider-Man #129.

=== March ===
- The first issue of the Lucky Luke monthly magazine is published, which will run until February 1975.
- Forbidden Tales of Dark Mansion, with issue #15, cancelled by DC.
- Prez, with issue #4, cancelled by DC.
- The first episodes of Trino (Triune) by Altan, an irreverent and even profane retelling of the Genesis creation narrative, appear in Linus.

=== April ===
- April 25: The first episode of Allan Salisbury's newspaper gag comic Snake Tales is published.
- The last issue of the Dutch underground magazine Aloha is published.
- With issue #164 (April /May cover date), Superman's Pal Jimmy Olsen (1954 series) changes its name and format to The Superman Family.
- Master of Kung Fu debuts with issue #17, continuing the numbering of Special Marvel Edition.
- With issue #6, Chilling Adventures in Sorcery changes its name to Red Circle Sorcery. (Red Circle Comics)

=== May ===
- May 9: In Spirou, the first chapter of the Yoko Tsuno story Message pour l'éternité is published by Roger Leloup.
- May 19: The Donald Duck album Paperino ai mondiali (Donald at the World Cup), realized by Mondadori for the 1974 FIFA World cup is published. It contains two stories: Paperino ai mondiali di calcio (Donald at the Football world cup), by Romano Scarpa and Paperino calciatore (Donald football player), by Gian Giacomo Dalmasso and Marco Rota.
- May 21 : In Le Journal de Tintin, the first chapter of the Ric Hochet story L'Homme qui Portait Malheur by André-Paul Duchâteau and Tibet is published.
- Marvel Comics raises the price of its typical comic book from 20 cents to 25 cents, keeping the page-count at 36.

=== June ===
- June 16: In the Italian Disney magazine Topolino, Mickey Kid and Goofy Six-Shots by Guido Martina and Giovan Battista Carpi (see below).
- The final episode of Marcel Gotlib's Hamster Jovial is published in the magazine Rock et Folk.
- Seaboard Periodicals formed by former Marvel Comics publisher Martin Goodman to publish comics under the Atlas Comics banner.
- In Italy the first issue of Corriere della paura (Fear Courier) by Editoriale Corno is published. An anthology magazine of the Marvel horror comics.

=== July ===
- July 11: In Le Monde, the first chapter of Asterix and Caesar’s gift by Goscinny and Uderzo is published.
- July 25: In Spirou, the first chapter of the Spirou et Fantasio story Le Gri-gri du Niokolo-Koba by Jean-Claude Fournier is serialized.
- Issue #120 of Sgt. Fury and his Howling Commandos, means the end of the series, cancelled by Marvel.
- The Amazing World of DC Comics #1, DC's in-house fanzine
- In Italy, the first issue of the erotic series Coxeman (StudioOriga) is published, which will only last two issues.

=== August ===
- August 7: In Le journal de Tintin, the first chapter of the Michel Vaillant story Champion du monde by Jean Graton is published.
- Roy Thomas steps down as Marvel Comics' editor-in-chief, succeeded by Len Wein (color titles) and Marv Wolfman (black-and-white titles).
- Giant-Size Super-Stars, with issue #2, changes its name to Giant-Size Fantastic Four (Marvel Comics).
- Worlds Unknown, with issue #8, is cancelled by Marvel.

=== September ===
- September 14: Dennis the Menace and Gnasher officially become the new magazine mascots of The Beano, appearing on each cover and replacing Biffo the Bear.
- Sub-Mariner, with issue #72, is cancelled by Marvel.
- Giant-Size Chillers, with issue #2, changes its name to Giant-Size Dracula (Marvel Comics).
- Supergirl, with issue #10 (September /October cover date), is cancelled by DC.
- Spider-Man: The Manga, with issue #30, is cancelled by Monthly Shōnen Magazine.
- Daim Press begins to publish I Protagonisti (The Protagonists), a collection of graphic novels, written and drawn by Rino Albertarelli, about the true lives of the American Frontier's heroes; the first is George Armstrong Custer. The series, very appreciated also for its historical accuracy, is interrupted after less than a year by the author's death.

=== October ===
  - October 1: The first issue of the short-lived comic magazine Achille Talon Magazine is published, based on the popularity of Michel Greg's Achille Talon. Inside, Bob De Groot and Turk's gag comic Léonard makes its debut.
- October 21: A weekly political-satirical gag comic spin-off of Jean Tabary's Iznogoud starts running in the French Sunday newspaper Journal du Dimanche. It will continue until 17 June 1979.
- Weird Worlds, with issue #10 (October /November cover date), is cancelled by DC.
- Giant-Size Creatures, with issue #2, changes its name to Giant-Size Werewolf (Marvel Comics).
- Monsters on the Prowl, with issue #30, is cancelled by Marvel.
- Wolverine makes his first appearance in The Incredible Hulk #180.
- In Batman #258 the psychiatric hospital Arkham Asylum makes its first appearance.
- In the magazine Lucky Luke, first chapter of the Lucky Luke story Le Cavalier blanc by Goscinny and Morris is published.

=== November ===
- November 9: The final episode of the Dutch funny animal comic Wipperoen (Whipper), by Raymond Bär von Hemmersweil and Jan van Reek, appears in print.
- November 13: In Le Journal de Tintin the first chapter of Alerte ! Extra-terrestres ! by André-Paul Duchâteau and Tibet is published.
- La Marcia della Disperazione (Despair March) by Guido Nolitta and Gallieno Ferri; Zagor, for the first time, has a love interest (Frida Lang). The story is considered by many fans the masterpiece of the Zagor series.

=== December ===
- December 1: The first issue of the French adult comics magazine Métal Hurlant is published by Les Humanoïdes Associés. It will run until 1987.
- December 27: Dick Matena launches the first version of his comic De Teloorgang van Oude Knudde in Pep.

=== Specific date unknown ===
- The Dutch comics appreciation society Het Stripschap establishes their annual Stripschapprijs, the most important Dutch comics award. The first winner is publishing company Skarabee.
- The final issue of the Flemish comics magazine/fanzine CISO-Magazine is published by Danny De Laet. It changes its name into Stripgids and receive a new chief editor, Jan Smet. Under its new name it will continue until 1985.
- Tim Wallace draws an underground comic strip named Ka-Blam, which features a man whose head explodes after smoking a joint.
- The Costa Rican artist Fernando Zeledón Guzmán creates the satirical comic strip La Semana en Serio in the communist magazine Adelante. It will run until 1991.
- Denis Gifford publishes The British Comics Catalogue, 1874-1974.
- Piet Fluwijn en Bolleke, created by Marc Sleen but continued by Jean-Pol, appears for the last time in print in 't Kapoentje.
- Mad Magazine makes a TV special where several of their comics series appear in animated form. The director is Chris Ishii. Unfortunately the special never airs, because network executives deem the comedy "too family unfriendly".
- From May to September, Marvel debuts their Giant-Size series, mostly double- or triple-length comics featuring their most popular characters. Many of the Giant-Size books are one-shots; none of the ongoing titles last more than six issues.
- Marvel Fireside Books debuts with Origins of Marvel Comics (Fireside Books/Simon & Schuster).
- Tut le Blanc's comic strip An Altar Boy Named Speck concludes.

== Deaths ==
=== January ===
- January 5: Haaken Christensen, Norwegian comics artist (Brumle), dies at age 87.
- January 8: Kreigh Collins, American comic artist (Mitzi McCoy, Kevin the Bold (later changed to Up Anchor)), dies at age 66.
- January 15: Richard E. Hughes, American comics writer and editor (Herbie Popnecker), dies at age 74.
- January 17: Arthur Radebaugh, American illustrator and comics artist (Closer Than We Think), dies at age 67.
- January 18: Bill Finger, American comic book writer and artist (DC Comics, Green Lantern, co-creator of Batman), dies at age 59.

=== February ===
- February 8: Franco Caprioli, Italian comics artist, dies at age 61.
- February 12: José Robledano, Spanish comics artist (El Suero Maravilloso), dies at age 89.
- February 16: Alfred Mazure, Dutch comics artist and writer, film director and novelist (Dick Bos, Romeo Brown), dies at the age of 59.

=== March ===
- March 4: Paul Gordeaux, French journalist, historian, playwright, novelist, comedian and comics writer (L' Histoire du Demi-Siècle, Le Crime Ne Paie Pas, Les Amours Célèbres), dies at age 82.
- March 16: Jo Ooms, Dutch writer, illustrator and comic artist (Slager Kokkie en zijn Fokkie), dies at age 60.
- March 21: Eric Parker, British comics artist and illustrator (worked for Knockout, Buster and Ranger, Pepys' Diary, Tommy Walls), dies at age 76.

=== April ===
- April 22: Tjalie Robinson, Dutch comics artist (Taaie en Neut), dies at age 63.
- April 27: Jean Bernard-Aldebert, French caricaturist, illustrator and comics artist (Adonis, Gigolette), dies at age 64.

=== May ===
- May 3: Ray Hoppman, American comics artist (Going Down!, This is the Life, Types of Humanity, Morals of Young Mister Wise, Make-A-Comic, Ma, Twinkling Stars, continued Assorted Nuts, Hank and Pete, Famous Fans), dies at age 87.
- May: Gene Bilbrew, American cartoonist and fetish artist (continued Clifford), dies at age 50.

=== June ===
- June 19: Yaakov Ashman, Israeli journalist and comic artist (Lulu, Gidi Gezer), dies at age 48.
- June 22: Alain Saint-Ogan, French comics artist, writer and animator (Zig et Puce, Prosper L'Ours, Monsieur Poche), dies at the age of 78.
- Specific date unknown: William St. John Glenn, British comics artist (Oscar, Dorothea, Ballyscunnion), dies at age 69.

=== July ===
- July 6: Herman Dirker, Dutch comic artist (Nol Nosum, Dit Verhaal op Maandagmorgen), dies at age 68.
- July 7:
  - Antonio Sciotti, Italian comics artist (Dev Bardai), dies at age 49.
  - Dave Wood, American comics writer (DC Comics, Harvey Comics, Lev Gleason), dies at age 47.
- July 9: Leo Dorfman, American comics writer (National Periodical), dies at age 60.
- July 12: Kurt Caesar, Italian comic artist (Romano il Legionario, Dino e Dario, Eroi dell'Aria, I Moschietteri del Aeroporto Z), dies at age 67 or 68.
- July 26: Gene Byrnes, American comics artist (Reg'lar Fellers), dies of a heart ailment at age 84.

=== August ===
- August 12: Bill McCail, aka Mac, British comics artist (worked for D.C. Thomson), dies at age 72.
- August 29: Luis Medrano, Argentine journalist and comics artist (Grafodramas, Matías), dies at age 59.

=== September ===
- September 5: James Swinnerton, American comics artist and painter (The Little Bears, Mr. Jack, Little Jimmy), dies at age 98.
- September 9: Manuel Urda Marín, Spanish comics artist and animator, dies at age 86.
- September 18: Gérard Alexandre, French comics artist (continued L'Espiègle Lili), dies at age 60.
- September 21: Paul Robinson, American comics artist (Etta Kett, The Love-Byrds), dies at age 76.

=== October ===
- October 13: Otto Binder, American comic book writer (DC Comics), dies at age 63.

=== November ===
- November 9: Charles W. Winter, American comics artist (Thorny the Cactus, Hank and His Whale, Jit Jones, Diggy the Derrick, Justin Thyme, Lady De Van), dies at age 56.

=== December ===
- December 3: Maurice Toussaint, French painter and comic artist (D'Artagnan, French-Bill), dies at age 92.
- December 15: Harry Hershfield, American humorist, radio comedian and comics artist (Abie the Agent), dies at age 89.
- December 22: Adrian Dingle, Welsh-Canadian painter and comics artist (Nelvana of the Northern Lights, The Penguin, Nils Grant, Private Investigator), dies at age 62.
- December 24: Everett M. "Busy" Arnold, American comics publisher (Quality Comics), dies at age 75.
- Specific date unknown: D. C. Eyles, British illustrator and comics artist (continued Kit Carson), dies at age 72.

=== Specific date unknown ===
- Bertie Brown, British comics artist (Homeless Hector, The Brownie Boys, Pa Perkins and Percy, Dad Walker and his Son Wally, Constable Cuddlecook, Smiler and Smudge, Pinhead and Pete, Jumbo Jim and Brother Tim, celebrity comics based on Charlie Chaplin among others), dies at age 86 or 87.
- Germán Butze, Mexican comics artist (Los Supersabios, Super Whiz Kids) dies at age 61 or 62.
- Mal Eaton, American comics artist (Peter Piltdown, AKA Rocky Stoneaxe), dies at age 71 or 72.
- Vernon Miller, Canadian comics artist (Iron Man), dies at age 62.
- Herbert Ruschke, German illustrator and comics artist (Waputa die Geierkralle, Ali Ben Populi and Hodscha Nasreddin), dies at age 59 or 60.

== Conventions ==
=== Europe ===
- January: Angoulême International Comics Festival (Angoulême, France) — first iteration of this festival; 10,000 attendees
- April 27: Comic Mart I (Holborn Assembly Hall, London, England) — organized by Rob Barrow and Nick Landau
- May 25: Emsworth comic convention (Emsworth, Hampshire, UK)
- July 21–22: Comicon '74 (British Comic Art Convention) (Regent Centre Hotel, London, England) — organized by Rob Barrow and Nick Landau; guests include Denis Gifford; double-billed as "Comic Mart Summer Special 1974"
- October 5: Comic Mart III (Holborn Assembly Hall, London, England) — organized by Rob Barrow and Nick Landau
- October 28–November 3: Salone Internazionale dei Comics (Lucca, Italy) — the 10th edition of the Lucca festival
- December 14: Comic Mart IV (Holborn Assembly Hall, London, England) — organized by Rob Barrow and Nick Landau

=== North America ===
- January 25–27: Cosmicon III (York University Winters College, Toronto, Ontario) — official guests include James Warren, Carmine Infantino, Stan Lee, P. J. O'Rourke, Michele Eury, Harvey Kurtzman, Sam Gross, Vaughn Bodē, Bernie Wrightson, Jeff Jones, Howard Chaykin, Neal Adams, Steve Skeates, and Steve Englehart
- Creation Con '74 (Hotel Commodore, New York City)
- March 2: Oak Con II (Sunset Room, Oakland University, Rochester Hills, MI) — produced by Steve Sundahl
- April 17–20: Berkeleycon 74, (Pauley Ballroom, ASUC Building, University of California, Berkeley) — second iteration, organized by local retailer Comics & Comix; guests include Mike Friedrich, Steve Englehart, Frank Brunner, Orvy Jundis, Vaughn Bodē, Jaxon, Rick Griffin, Greg Irons, and Victor Moscoso
- Summer: Nostalgia '74, 3rd Annual Chicago Comic and Nostalgia Convention (Chicago, Illinois) — produced by Nancy Warner
- June 20–23: Houstoncon '74 (Sheraton-Lincoln Hotel, Houston, Texas) — merged with Star Trek '74 and produced by Earl Blair Jr. and G. B. Love (known colloquially as "Houston Double Con"); guests include Walter Koenig, Al Williamson, Dan Adkins, Don Newton, Kenneth Smith, Fred Fredericks, Jock Mahoney, Kirk Alyn, Tom Steele, William Benedict, and stuntman Dave Sharpe
- July 4–8: Comic Art Convention (Hotel Commodore, New York City) — guests include Bob Kane and Marie Severin
- July 31–August 5: San Diego Comic-Con (El Cortez Hotel, San Diego, California) — official guests: Majel Barrett, Milton Caniff, Frank Capra, Chuck Jones, Walter Koenig, Russ Manning, Russell Myers, Charles M. Schulz, Larry "Seymour" Vincent
- September: OrlandoCon (Howard Johnson's Hotel, Orlando, Florida) — first edition of the show started by regional chairman of the National Cartoonists Society Jim Ivey; guests include C. C. Beck, Roy Crane, Hal Foster, Ron Goulart, Mel Graff, Les Turner, Ralph Dunagin, Bill Crooks, Harold McCauley, Ralph Dunagin, "Scorchy Smith" artist Edmond Good, and Disney artist Ralph Kent
- October 10–13: Detroit Triple Fan Fair (Detroit, Michigan) — 10th edition of the fair; official guests include Carmine Infantino, Stan Lee, James Warren, Jim Steranko, Michael Kaluta, and Barry Windsor-Smith; other guests include Alan Ormsby, Rich Buckler, Keith Pollard, and Arvell Jones; program cover by Will Eisner
- November: Famous Monsters Convention (New York City) — first annual show, co-produced by Phil Seuling; guests include Forrest J Ackerman, Verne Langdon, Catherine Lorre, Cal Floyd, and publisher/distributor Sam Sherman

== Awards ==
=== Comic Fan Art Awards ===
(Formerly the Goethe Awards) Announced in The Buyer's Guide to Comics Fandom #123 (March 26, 1976) (for comics published in 1974). Awards co-administered by Ken Gale.

- Favorite Writer: Roy Thomas
- Favorite Penciller: Jim Starlin
- Favorite Inker: Tom Palmer
- Favorite Editor: Roy Thomas
- Favorite Comic Book: E-Man (Charlton)
- Favorite Fanzine: The Comic Reader

=== Shazam Awards ===
Shazam Awards presented in 1975 for comics published in 1974:

- Best Continuing Feature: Conan the Barbarian (Marvel Comics)
- Best Individual Story: "Götterdämmerung", in Detective Comics #443 (DC)
- Best Individual Short Story (Dramatic): "Cathedral Perilous" (Manhunter) by Archie Goodwin and Walt Simonson, Detective Comics #441 (DC)
- Best Writer (Dramatic Division): Archie Goodwin
- Best Penciller (Dramatic Division): John Buscema
- Best Inker (Dramatic Division): Dick Giordano
- Best Humor Story: "Kaspar the Dead Baby" Crazy #8 (Marvel)
- Best Writer (Humor Division): Steve Skeates
- Best Penciller (Humor Division): Marie Severin
- Best Inker (Humor Division): Ralph Reese
- Best Letterer: John Costanza
- Best Colorist: Tatjana Wood
- Outstanding New Talent: Craig Russell
- Superior Achievement by an Individual: Roy Thomas
- Hall of Fame: Jack Kirby

== First issues by title ==
=== DC Comics ===
OMAC

Release: September /October Writer/Artist: Jack Kirby.

Rima, the Jungle Girl

Release: April /May. Editor: Joe Kubert.

The Sandman

Release: Winter. Writer: Joe Simon. Artists: Jack Kirby and Mike Royer.

=== Marvel Comics ===
Comix Book

Release: October by Magazine Management Co. Editor: Denis Kitchen.

Deadly Hands of Kung Fu

Release: April by Curtis Magazines. Editor: Roy Thomas.

Doctor Strange

Release: June. Writer: Steve Englehart (co-plot; script), Frank Brunner (co-plot). Artists: Frank Brunner and Dick Giordano.

Giant-Size Avengers

Release: August. Editor: Roy Thomas.

Giant-Size Chillers

Release: June. Editor: Roy Thomas.

Giant-Size Conan

Release: September. Editor: Roy Thomas.

Giant-Size Creatures

Release: July. Writer: Tony Isabella. Artists: Don Perlin and Vince Colletta.

Giant-Size Defenders

Release: July. Editor: Roy Thomas.

Giant-Size Man-Thing

Release: August. Editor: Roy Thomas.

Giant-Size Master of Kung Fu

Release: September. Editor: Roy Thomas.

Giant-Size Spider-Man

Release: July. Editor: Roy Thomas.

Giant-Size Super-Stars

Release: May. Writer: Gerry Conway. Artists: Rich Buckler and Joe Sinnott.

Haunt of Horror

Release: May by Curtis Magazines. Editor: Roy Thomas.

Ka-Zar vol. 2

Release: January Writer: Mike Friedrich. Artists: Paul Reinman and Mike Royer.

Man-Thing

Release: January. Writer: Steve Gerber. Artists: Val Mayerik and Sal Trapani.

Marvel Two-in-One

Release: January. Writer: Steve Gerber. Artists: Gil Kane and Joe Sinnott.

Planet of the Apes

Release: August by Curtis Magazines. Writers: Gerry Conway and Doug Moench. Artist: Mike Ploog.

Savage Sword of Conan

Release: August by Curtis Magazines. Editor: Roy Thomas.

=== Independent titles and manga ===
Hana to Yume

Release: May by Hakusensha.

Jinty

Release: November 5 by Fleetway.

Métal Hurlant

Release: December by Les Humanoïdes Associés.

Princess

Release: by Akita Shoten

Star*Reach

Release: April by Star*Reach. Editor: Mike Friedrich.

Warlord

Release: September 28 by D.C. Thomson.

The First Kingdom

Release: by Comics and Comix

== Initial appearance by character name ==
=== DC Comics ===
- Anthony Lupus, in Batman #255 (April)
- Harvey Bullock, in Detective Comics #441 (June)
- Global Peace Agency, in OMAC #1 (October)
- Inspector William Henderson, in Action Comics #440 (October)
- Libra, in Justice League of America #111 (June)
- OMAC, in OMAC #1 (October)
- Quentin Turnbull, in Weird Western Tales #22 (March/April)
- Rima, in Rima the Jungle Girl #1 (April /May)
- Sandman, in Sandman #1 (Winter)
- Vartox, in Superman #281 (November)

=== Marvel Comics ===
- Allatou, in Marvel Spotlight #18 (October)
- Alpha the Ultimate Mutant, in Defenders #15 (September)
- Aries (Grover Raymond), in The Avengers #120 (February)
- Baron Macabre, in Jungle Action #9 (May)
- Abe Brown, in Deadly Hands of Kung Fu #1 (April)
- Deathlok (Luther Manning), in Astonishing Tales #25 (August)
- Bob Diamond, in Deadly Hands of Kung Fu #1 (April)
- Doctor Sun, in Tomb of Dracula #16 (January)
- Dragon Lord (Nu-An), in Marvel Premiere #15 (May)
- Equinox, in Marvel Team-Up #23 (July)
- Foolkiller, in Man-Thing #3 (March)
- Gabriel the Devil Hunter, in Haunt of Horror #2 (July)
- Grizzly (Maxwell Markham), in The Amazing Spider-Man #139 (December)
- Hammer and Anvil, in The Incredible Hulk #182 (December)
- Iron Fist, in Marvel Premiere #15 (May)
- Hannibal King, in The Tomb of Dracula #25 (October)
- Lilith, in Giant-Size Chillers featuring Curse of Dracula #1 (June)
- Malice, in Jungle Action vol. 2, #8 (January)
- Nefarius, in Captain America #169 (January)
- Nitro, in Captain Marvel #34 (September)
- Punisher, in The Amazing Spider-Man #129 (February)
- Roxxon Energy Corporation, in Captain America #180 (December)
- Silver Samurai, in Daredevil #111 (July)
- Lin Sun, in Deadly Hands of Kung Fu #1 (April)
- Colleen Wing, in Marvel Premiere #19 (November)
- Wolverine, in The Incredible Hulk #180 (October)
- Wrecking Crew, in Defenders #17 (November)
  - Bulldozer
  - Piledriver
  - Thunderball
- Y'Garon, in Giant-Size Dracula #2 (September )

=== Independent titles ===
- Tara Fremont, in Tara on the Dark Continent (Paragon Publications)
- Yor the hunter, by Juan Zanotto and Ray Collins, on Skorpio.
- Jonathan Cartland, trapper similar to Jeremiah Johnson, by Michel Blanc-Dumont, on Lucky Luke.
- Yves Sanclair, jet pilot, by Claude Moliterni and Patrice Serres, on Phenix.
- Johnny Focus, press photographer and adventurer, by Attillio Micheluzzi, on Corriere dei Ragazzi (February 24)
- Mickey the Kid and Six-Shoot Goofy, two bounty-hunters in the Far West, ancestors of Mickey and Goofy, by Guido Martina, on Topolino (June 16).
