= OrlandoCon =

Defunct comics convention

- Status: Defunct
- Genre: Comic books, TV, and movies
- Venue: International Inn
- Locations: Orlando, Florida
- Country: United States
- Inaugurated: 1974
- Most recent: 1994
- Organizer: Jim Ivey & Charlie Roberts
- Filing status: for-profit

OrlandoCon, also known as O'Con, was a long-running comic book and comic strip fan convention which was held annually between 1974 and 1994 in Orlando, Florida. The first comics convention held in the Orlando area, OrlandoCon billed itself as the "Central Florida comic art convention and early TV/film festival." Captain Marvel-creator C. C. Beck was a regular guest of the show; as were many other Golden Age comics creators who lived in the Orlando area.

The founders of OrlandoCon were regional chairman of the National Cartoonists Society Jim Ivey (1925–2022) and local enthusiasts Charlie Roberts, Rob Word, Richard Kravitz, and Neil Austin. Most OrlandoCons took place over a September weekend.

== Events and activities ==
Each year's show featured a banquet for attending cartoonists and the presentation to the guest of honor of a gold brick called the Ignatz Award named in honor of George Herriman's Krazy Kat. Recipients of the Ignatz included Don Martin, Ralph Kent, Joe Kubert, Martin Nodell, Don Addis, Burne Hogarth, and Dik Browne. (The OrlandoCon Ignatz Award is not connected to the current award of the same name presented annually at the Bethesda, Maryland-based Small Press Expo.)

Each show featured a charity auction to benefit the Milt Gross Fund of the National Cartoonists Society. The OrlandoCon often featured screenings of early TV shows, as well as panels, seminars, and workshops with comics professionals. In addition, there was a floorspace for exhibitors, including comic book and comic strip dealers, and collectibles merchants. The show included an autograph area, as well as an Artists' Alley where comics artists signed autographs and sold or produced free sketches.

== History ==
The first OrlandoCon was held in September 1974 at the Orlando Howard Johnson's Convention Center — guests included C. C. Beck, Roy Crane, Hal Foster, Ron Goulart, Mel Graff, Les Turner, Ralph Dunagin, Bill Crooks, Harold McCauley, Scorchy Smith artist Edmond Good, and Disney artist Ralph Kent.

In 1976 OrlandoCon moved venues from the Howard Johnson Convention Center to the International Inn, where the convention stayed for most of the rest of its existence.

Even though he moved to Pennsylvania in 1974, Charlie Roberts stayed with the OrlandoCon as co-organizer with Jim Ivey until 1979, at which point small press publisher Bill Black became involved with the convention.

With the collapse of the comic book speculating market in 1993, the show petered out. The final OrlandoCon was produced by local retailer Mike Kott on September 10–11, 1994, at the Clarion Towers; guests included show founder Jim Ivey and Martin Nodell. A rival event, "Mega-Show" was inaugurated in 1993 and evolved into the ongoing huge Orlando-based multi-genre convention MegaCon as the spiritual successor of OrlandoCon.

=== Locations and dates ===
Dates	Guests	Building	Notes
September 22, 1974	Neil Austin, C. C. Beck, Wally Bishop, Roy Crane, Bill Crooks, Ralph Dunagin, Hal Foster, Mel Graff, Kirby Grant, Jim Ivey, Harold W. McCauley, Bill Perry	Howard Johnson's Convention Center 304 West Colonial Drive	Roy Crane won Ignatz award. Convention booklet featured a cover sketch by Roy Crane; the back cover was illustrated by C.C. Beck.
August 16–17, 1975	Roy Crane, Hal Foster, Burne Hogarth, Jim Ivey, Harvey Kurtzman, Fred Wagner	Howard Johnson Convention Center	Burne Hogarth won Ignatz award. Program booklet cover by Harvey Kurtzman
September 18–19, 1976	Jack Davis, Ralph Dunagin, Floyd Gottfredson, Harvey Kurtzman	International Inn 6327 International Drive	Roy Crane won the Ignatz Award
September 24–25, 1977	C. C. Beck, Bill Crooks, Bob Donovan, Ralph Dunagin, Walter B. Gibson, David Graue, Harold W. McCauley, Dick Moores, Zack Mosley, David Rothel, Hank Schlensker, Fred Wagner	International Inn	C. C. Beck and Dick Moores won the Ignatz Award. Program booklet cover featured The Spirit, drawn by Will Eisner; the back cover was drawn by Bob Clampett; and interior art by, among others, Les Turner, C. C. Beck, Bill Black, Morris Weiss, and Zack Mosley. 3,000 attending
September 30-October 1, 1978	C. C. Beck, Bill Black, Bob Clampett, Bill Crooks, Ralph Dunagin, Will Eisner, Edmond Good, Ralph Kent, Les Turner, Morris Weiss	International Inn	Show's official title was "Central Florida Comic Art Convention, TV & Film Festival." Program cover by Will Eisner
September 29-30, 1979	C. C. Beck, Wayne Boring, Robert Cummings, Will Eisner, Shary Flenniken, Ron Goulart, Kirby Grant, Fred Hembeck, Bob Kane, Jack Rosen, Bob Taylor	International Inn	Robert Cummings and Kirby Grant won the Ignatz award
September 27-28, 1980	Gil Kane, Jack Rosen, Autumn Russell	International Inn	Jock Mahoney was the guest of honor
September 26-27, 1981	C. C. Beck, Ron Goulart, Gil Kane, Fred Lasswell	International Inn	Dik Browne was unable to attend and Fred Lasswell accepted the Ignatz Award on his behalf. Program book, with a cover by Dik Browne, celebrating "Florida's 70 Cartoonists"
September 25-26, 1982	John Beatty, C. C. Beck, Bill Black, Pat Broderick, Bill Crooks, Ralph Dunagin, Mike Golden, Ray Gotto, Joe Haldeman, Jim Ivey, Jeff Keate, Ralph Kent, Allan Kurzrok, Fred Lasswell, Bob McLeod, Sheldon Moldoff, Zack Mosley, Hank Schlensker, Dana Summers, Les Turner, Fred Wagner	International Inn	Bob McLeod won the Ignatz Award. The program booklet honored "Florida's 75 Great Cartoonists"
September 24-25, 1983	C. C. Beck, Wayne Boring, Dik Browne, Will Eisner, Ralph Kent, Joe Kubert, Harvey Kurtzman, Morris Weiss, Don Wright, Dean Young	International Inn	Don Wright won the Ignatz Award. 10th anniversary show; program cover included a list of Florida cartoonists and featured artwork by Harvey Kurtzman, Wayne Boring, C. C. Beck, Morris Weiss, Dik Browne, and Dean Young, among others.
September 22–23, 1984	Ralph Dunagin, Will Eisner	International Inn	Dunagin won the Ignatz Award
September 28-29, 1985	Martin Nodell	International Inn	Martin Nodell won the Ignatz Award
September 27-28, 1986		International Inn	
September 26–27, 1987		International Inn	
September 24-25, 1988		International Inn	
September 23–24, 1989	Bob Burden	International Inn	Bob Burden won the Ignatz Award
September 22-23, 1990	Gates McFadden	International Inn	17th annual edition, celebrating the 50th anniversary of Martin Nodell's Green Lantern. Program booklet cover by Bill Black.
September 21-22, 1991	Dick Ayers, Joe Kubert	Clarion Plaza, 9700 International Drive	Dick Ayers and Joe Kubert were guests of honor
September 26-27, 1992	Jack Bender, Dick Giordano, Frank Gladstone	International Inn	Jack Bender won the Ignatz Award
September 25-26, 1993	Don Addis, Don Martin	International Inn	Don Addis and Don Martin were guests of honor.
September 10–11, 1994	Jonathan Harris, Jim Ivey, Martin Nodell	Clarion Plaza	Jim Ivey and Martin Nodell were guests of honor. Produced by local retailer Mike Kott. Last OrlandoCon.
