= Ralph Kent =

Ralph Kent may refer to:

- Ralph S. Kent, American football coach
- Ralph Kent (artist)
