= La Settimana Enigmistica =

Weekly Italian puzzle magazine

- Editor: Francesco Baggi Sisini
- Frequency: Weekly
- First issue: January 23, 1932
- Country: Italy
- Based in: Milan, Italy
- Language: Italian
- Website: www.lasettimanaenigmistica.com
- ISSN: 1125-5226

La Settimana Enigmistica is a weekly Italian word puzzle and word search magazine, published since 1932 with Europe-wide distribution. It is one of Italy's most popular and top-selling magazines.

== History ==
La Settimana Enigmistica was founded by Giorgio Sisini, a Milan-based Sardinian nobleman, Count of Sant'Andrea (metropolitan city of Cagliari). His father was the founder of the Rotary Club of Sardinia. The first edition of the magazine was published on 23 January 1932 and featured a stylized portrait of Mexican actress Lupe Vélez on the front cover. The magazine has featured word puzzles contributed by the most famous constructors, including Piero Bartezzaghi, Giancarlo Brighenti, Bruno Makain and Sisini himself. After Sisini died in 1972, the magazine was edited first by Raoul De Giusti and then by Francesco Baggi Sisini. In November 2008, La Settimana Enigmistica reached the milestone of 4,000 issues.

== Layout ==
The layout of the magazine has remained the same for several years. The heading on the cover is alternatively in one of three primary colours: blue, green, or red. The front cover always features a crossword grid with an inset photograph of a personality from the world of entertainment and sport. Even-numbered editions feature a male personality, while odd-numbered issues feature a female personality. Since 1995, some of the illustrations in the magazine have been printed in colour. One characteristic that makes La Settimana Enigmistica unique is that it does not accept advertising and rarely uses it to sell the magazine.

== Word Puzzles ==
Many of the word puzzles featured in La Settimana Enigmistica are crosswords. A number of these (usually the level entry ones) use an American-style grid (one containing few black squares). As well as crosswords, the magazine contains many other types of puzzles, including:

- variants on the crossword puzzle, such as parole crociate senza schema (diagramless crosswords), syllabic crosswords, cornici concentriche (a barred crossword in which answers read left to right and in concentric rings) and incroci obbligati (a diagramless crossword containing no indication of where the answers are to be written and with clues given in random order);
- cryptograph crosswords, in which a number corresponds to a letter;
- other types of puzzles based on a grid but unrelated to crosswords in the strict sense of the term, such as la Persiana (literally "the persian blind") in which the solver has to discover the key of the puzzle based on the first (sometimes second) syllabe of the definitions;
- minor puzzles, such as Il Bersaglio ("The Target"; a puzzle in which words are arranged in rings, the object being to link all of the words via associations or word play, such as anagrams or adding or dropping letters, the completed chain of words ending at the word in the centre of the "target");
- La pagina della sfinge ("The Page of the Sphinx"), a page of riddles, anagrams, charades etc., often in verse, in which the aim is to find words related by various types of wordplay;
- general-knowledge quizzes;
- various illustrated games, such as rebuses, Aguzzate la vista (Spot the difference); Che cosa manca (What's Missing?), a series of apparently identical cartoons in which each is lacking a number of details present in the others, the goal being to find these details; and Il confronto ("The Comparison"), a puzzle in which two cartoons have a number of details in common but in different places in each;
- puzzles of a legal nature, such as Se voi foste il giudice ("If you were the judge"), inspired by a legal case from real life in which the reader is asked to decide the verdict; and other puzzles in which a cartoon presents a detective story and the reader needs to work out how the detective reached his or her conclusion;
- numerical puzzles, such as sudokus and cryptarithms;
- curious and unusual facts and stories, such as Forse non tutti sanno che... ("Perhaps not everyone knows that...");
- Strano ma vero ("Strange but true"); and Si può crederci... o no? ("Can you believe it...or not?"), in which the user needs to determine which of several seemingly far-fetched stories are true and which are false.

Every week there is at least one competition open to readers, with a special annual one in December.

The rigorous progressive numbering of all the word puzzles facilitates looking up the solutions, which are normally included in the following issue (the solutions to competitions are published three issues after the competitions appear).

== Comic Strips ==
As well as the above, many pages carry a cartoon, and there are also whole pages dedicated to humour, with comic strips and jokes from regular contributors. Some of the strips have ongoing themes, such as:

- Andy Capp (ended in 2008)
- Drabble
- The Born Loser
- Fred Basset
- Willy n' Ethel
- The Duplex
- Klein Herr Jacob
- Bound and Gagged (comic strip)

== See also ==
- List of magazines in Italy
