= Doiby Dickles =

- Doiby Dickles as he appeared in Green Lantern #3 (March 1942). Art by Martin Nodell.

Publication information
- Publisher: DC Comics
- First appearance: All-American Comics #27 (June 1941)
- Created by: Bill Finger; Irwin Hasen

In-story information
- Full name: Charles "Doiby" Dickles
- Species: Human
- Team affiliations: Old Justice
- Notable aliases: Devastatin' Doiby
- Abilities: Basic combat skills; Expertise in aviation and driving

Charles "Doiby" Dickles is a fictional character from DC Comics. He was the original sidekick for Alan Scott (the first Green Lantern), appearing in comic book stories starring that hero from 1941 to 1949. He has a prominent New York accent.

== Publication history ==
The character was created by writer Bill Finger and artist Irwin Hasen. In an interview, Hasen said:

I got it from the actor, Edward Brophy, who was an Irish detective before the World War in the 1930s Warner Bros. movies. He was an overweight little taxicab driver with a little derby and a cigar, and what an unlikely assistant for a guy like the Green Lantern! It was ridiculous.

Kurt Mitchell and Roy Thomas wrote that Doiby was "the first of the comic relief sidekicks that came to define the [All-American] approach to super-heroics in the early '40s".

== Fictional character biography ==
=== Earlier stories ===
Charles "Doiby" Dickles is a taxi driver. His first adventure with Green Lantern occurs when Doiby follows Green Lantern while he was trailing a group of thugs. After Green Lantern was supposedly killed by the thugs, Doiby confronts them in a Green Lantern costume in an attempt to stop them. Soon after, the actual Green Lantern appears and, with the help of Doiby, saves the day. After that adventure, Green Lantern sent Doiby a quaint letter: "Doiby, I could use a good man like you to help me in my fight against all evil — How about it? -The Green Lantern". After that, Doiby began working with Alan Scott on a regular basis eventually learning that the Green Lantern and Alan Scott were one and the same.

Doiby and Alan later try to assist Solomon Grundy during his first appearance. It does not go well as Grundy goes on a murderous rampage and must be destroyed. He seemingly meets his end under the wheels of a train. This adventure also has a backup Hop Harrigan story, as did many of Doiby's 'All American Comics' adventures. This adventure is re-told in 2002, with a focus on another close friend of Alan Scott, newswoman Irene Miller.

Doiby and the Green Lantern had many adventures together, including taking on Nazis in the WWII era. With his thick Brooklyn accent, Doiby invariably addresses Green Lantern as "Lan'trin". As a cab driver, Doiby's slogan is "Soivice that don't make youse noivice". He refers to his cab as 'Goitrude'. Doiby often assists in battle with a skilled swing of a pipe wrench. Alan Scott later becomes the head of Gotham Broadcasting, a radio station based out of Gotham City. He brings in Doiby as his personal assistant. Doiby becomes involved with Princess Raima of Myrg, an alien who flees to Earth to escape a forced marriage to an evil man named Prince Peril. He gets his friends involved, who help rescue her but not before Doiby serves time as a court jester.

=== Later stories ===
Near the end of the Silver Age of Comic Books, it was retconned that Doiby was sent into space to marry Princess Ramia at the end of the Golden Age, with the aliens enjoying his vast wisdom, and Alan Scott went on with his solo career. Myrg comes to resemble Doiby's beloved Brooklyn.

He briefly returns to Earth to assist the Green Lanterns in a new problem: Sinestro has possessed his taxi. He had left it behind in Hal Jordan's garage when he went to Myrg. The threat is eventually neutralized but Goitrude is destroyed. Doiby had traveled to Earth with a 'dimension-change' but this device is lost in the confrontation. Later, Goitrude is repaired.

Doiby continues to live as king until his position was usurped by the evil Prince Marieb.

Sometime later, Doiby joins a group called "Old Justice". It is made up of the 'sidekicks' of many Golden Age heroes: Dan the Dyna-Mite, Merry Pemberton, Neptune Perkins, Second Sweep of Hourman's Minute Men of America, and Ma Hunkel's children Dinky and Sisty Jibbet, who operated as the Cyclone Kids. They are convinced that the younger superheroes are not responsible enough to be involved in 'the game'.

During the Sins of Youth storyline, one of Doiby's alien devices combines with the magic from Klarion the Witch Boy. This alters the ages of dozens of superheroes and supervillains, which the adults being transformed into children and vice versa. Doiby and other members of Old Justice find themselves having to herd and baby-sit adults-turned-kids, many of whom have become vastly irresponsible. They are assisted by some of the now-adult super-beings. Basing themselves out of the old JLA headquarters in Happy Harbor, the adults and kids eventually find a way to blackmail Klarion into working with Doiby to reverse the changes. This incident convinces Old Justice that Young Justice can take care of themselves.

=== Back to Myrg ===
Doiby reunites with the team because of the coincidence of Young Justice using the older hero's meeting spots. He convinces them to take him back to the planet Myrg. Impulse had recently received a spaceship in return for helping a rich sultan. While traveling through space, a younger version of Lobo talks his way into joining the mission. As is usual for Lobo, he is in it for the violence.

After arriving, the team realizes Marieb had caused Doiby to be exiled from Mryg. Ramia had married the villain for the guarantee Doiby would be left alive. Marieb is defeated but the threat of the alien Slag arrives.

The Slag race enjoys the game of baseball and agrees that they would face down Young Justice and Doiby for the sake of the planet. The Young Justice team wins by blatant cheating. Doiby and his Queen are able to go back to ruling Myrg.

Doiby appears one more time to see Young Justice off in friendly terms. They use another form of transport, accidentally leaving Impulse's ship on Myrg.

== Skills and abilities ==
Doiby Dickles has no superpowers, but he is a skilled driver, pilot, and unarmed combatant.
