= Don Addis =

American cartoonist

- Born: Donald Gordon Addis; September 13, 1935 Hollywood, California
- Died: November 29, 2009 (aged 74)
- Area: Cartoonist
- Notable works: Bent Offerings
- Awards: National Cartoonist Society Newspaper Panel Cartoon Award, 1993; Ignatz Award (OrlandoCon) Freedom from Religion Foundation’s Freethought in the Media “Tell It Like It Is” award, 2005

Donald Gordon Addis (September 13, 1935 – November 29, 2009) was an American comic strip artist.

He received his bachelor's degree in design from the University of Florida, where he was in charge of the production lab for the student newspaper, The Alligator (later The Independent Florida Alligator). His work includes a self-published collection of his work at UF, numerous freelance cartoons for Playboy magazine, and the syndicated newspaper strips:

- Briny Deep (1980–1981)
- The Great John L., also known as Babyman (1982–1985)
- Bent Offerings (1988–2004)

Addis was a longtime member of the Freedom From Religion Foundation. He received the Foundation's Freethought in the Media “Tell It Like It Is” award at the 2005 national convention in Orlando.

Addis received the National Cartoonist Society Newspaper Panel Cartoon Award for 1992 for his work on Bent Offerings.

He retired as an editorial cartoonist and columnist with the St. Petersburg Times Publishing Company in 2004, where he had worked since 1964.

Addis died of lung cancer at the age of 74 on November 29, 2009.
