= Solomon Grundy (character) =

DC Comics supervillain

- Solomon Grundy on the cover of Solomon Grundy #1 (April 2010). Art by Scott Kolins.

Publication information
- Publisher: DC Comics
- First appearance: All-American Comics #61 (October 1944)
- Created by: Alfred Bester (writer); Paul Reinman (artist)

In-story information
- Alter ego: Cyrus Gold
- Species: Zombie
- Team affiliations: Injustice Society; Injustice League; Injustice League Dark; Legion of Doom; Infinity Inc. Secret Society of Super Villains; Suicide Squad; Black Lantern Corps
- Abilities: Superhuman strength, stamina, and durability; Regeneration; Immortality

Solomon Grundy (Cyrus Gold) is a supervillain and occasional antihero appearing in American comic books published by DC Comics. He was originally depicted as a murder victim brought back to life as a corporeal revenant or zombie, though subsequent versions of the character have occasionally depicted a different origin. His name is taken from the 19th century nursery rhyme "Solomon Grundy."

Grundy was introduced as an enemy of comic book hero Alan Scott (the original Green Lantern), but has since become a prominent enemy for a number of superheroes such as Superman, Batman, and other members of the Justice League. As a revenant whose backstory often involves coming back to life after being deposited in a swamp, later writers have also given him ties to Swamp Thing, one of DC's horror-fantasy heroes.

Solomon Grundy has been adapted into numerous media outside comics, including television series and films. Mark Hamill and Fred Tatasciore, among others, have voiced the character in animation. The character appeared as Butch Gilzean in the first four seasons of Fox's television series Gotham, portrayed by Drew Powell. Grundy also appeared in the first and second seasons of Stargirl, portrayed via CGI.

== Publication history ==
Created by Alfred Bester, he first appeared in All-American Comics #61 (October 1944).

Grundy is the focus of one of the four Faces of Evil one-shots that explore the aftermath of Final Crisis, written by Scott Kolins and Geoff Johns, with art by Shane Davis. It is the introduction to a seven part mini-series featuring the character.

== Fictional character biography ==
=== Pre-Crisis ===
==== Earth-Two version's history ====
The cover to All-American Comics #61, by Paul Reinman

In the late 19th century, a wealthy merchant named Cyrus Gold is murdered and his body is disposed of in Slaughter Swamp, near Gotham City. Fifty years later, he is reanimated as a zombie-like creature composed partly of swamp matter with no memory of his previous life. He becomes an enemy of the Green Lantern, Alan Scott, proving to be a difficult enemy due to being made of wood and thus resistant to his powers.

A criminal scientist calling himself the Baron of York kills his brother and takes over his gang, stating to them that he knows where to find the body of Solomon Grundy. Once the body is found, the Baron of York injects Grundy with concentrated chlorophyll upon knowing his background. The side effect turns Solomon Grundy into a plant. When the Baron of York bluffs about him being worshipped and served, Solomon Grundy kills the Baron of York and takes over his gang. While noting that Solomon Grundy is more invulnerable to his ring due to the chlorophyll, Green Lantern chases after Solomon Grundy until he becomes exhausted in the petrified forest in Arizona. Using his ring, Green Lantern traps Grundy in a green plasma bubble for a time.

A freak weather occurrence releases Solomon Grundy from his prison. Making his way across country, Grundy heads for the headquarters of the Justice Society of America. Green Lantern arrives early for the meeting and when the other members arrive, they find their headquarters smashed to pieces and Green Lantern missing from the ranks. Johnny turns on the radio, which blares the warning that Solomon Grundy is on the loose; the members believe, based on a large, muddy footprint on the floor, that Grundy got to HQ and took Green Lantern. The radio continues its report, listing cities where Grundy was seen, so each member picks a city and heads for it to try to find Green Lantern while Wonder Woman stays behind. The scene now shifts back to the moment at JSA HQ where Green Lantern had opened the door. To his surprise, Doiby Dickles walks in, and informs him that Grundy has freed himself and is on the loose. Green Lantern leaves immediately, hoping to find Grundy before any of the JSA members are hurt going after him. Minutes later, Grundy arrives at JSA HQ, and, not finding the Lantern there, he smashes the place up, then leaves. Green Lantern and Doiby use a special radio-like device Alan Scott had developed that is attuned to the mental wavelengths of Grundy himself; Green Lantern calculates the path of Grundy and announces over the radio in JSA HQ where Grundy will strike. When Green Lantern and Grundy meet, Grundy rips a tree out by its roots and smashes it into the Lantern. Green Lantern fights back with his power ring and fists until both men fall into a nearby stream and over a small waterfall. The Lantern is severely dazed and tries to ward off Grundy with his ring, but he is much too weak. Grundy grabs Green Lantern by the throat and begins to squeeze the life out of him, holding his head underwater. However, Hawkman strikes Grundy with his mace, and Doctor Mid-Nite revives the Lantern. A combined attack brings down Grundy, and Green Lantern deposits Grundy on a distant, lifeless planet.

A battle soon commences when Grundy's body gravitates towards young astronomer Dick Cashmere as he learns to ride light waves, resulting in his assuming Cashmere's identity for a time while leaving the real one bound and gagged, though the Society finds him soon after. In this incarnation, he gains intelligence, which he subsequently loses when Green Lantern defeats and buries Grundy in 1947.

At this point, Grundy is freed and enlisted along with several other supervillains by the time-traveling criminal Per Degaton in his second appearance, who has traveled to 1941 to capture the Justice Society of America on the day of the attack on timeline, hoping to change history and take over the world. Grundy encounters Green Lantern, Flash, and Wonder Woman in Echo Park, whom Grundy knows from 1947. Grundy bests the costumed trio, and is summoned by a mysterious voice to deliver them or "pay the penalty". The All-Star Squadron comes to their rescue, and Grundy is the last villain to be transported back. He is thrust back to the Moon, where he remains for over two decades, as this timeline is erased once Degaton is defeated.

After many years, Grundy is knocked loose from his planet prison and returns to Earth to battle Green Lantern, Hourman, and Doctor Fate. At this point, he has temporary mastery over all wooden objects. Solomon Grundy is imprisoned orbiting the Earth in a stronger bubble created by the combined powers of Green Lantern and Doctor Fate.

Grundy was once pulled to Earth-One and substituted for the superstrong Blockbuster due to a machine that was accidentally pulling the Earths together in warp-space and substituting people. During this event, he had absorbed some of Doctor Fate's magic, is stronger than before, and is even able to telekinetically lift Flash into the air. He hates Green Lantern so much he thinks everyone he sees is Green Lantern. He is imprisoned inside a mountain by Earth-One Green Lantern after being lifted up by Earth-One Hawkman and dazed by blows from all the heroes, but when the machine is turned off he is substituted for Blockbuster on Earth-Two and renews the attack, defeating numerous heroes. However, the JSA and JLA went to battle an Anti-Matter being that was threatening both Earths in Warp-Space after being summoned by Fate, who had sensed the threat due to the Spectre. As the heroes return, they find Green Lantern had placed Grundy and Blockbuster together to occupy them, and the two have knocked the hate out of each other. Grundy is then taken back to his Earth by the Justice Society.

In his next appearance, Solomon Grundy battles the combined might of both the Justice Society, and later their counterparts the Justice League, nearly to a standstill at Slaughter Swamp, when he develops an affection for a lost alien child who has accidentally been sent to Earth-2 and is dying due to separation from his pet. Having absorbed magic from Doctor Fate and Green Lantern, Grundy is easily able to defeat the combined might of Superman, Flash, Earth-Two Hawkman, Earth-One Hawkman, and Green Lantern, until he is defeated by both Green Lanterns and sealed in Slaughter Swamp. The alien child is finally reunited with his pet and sent back to his own dimension.

While imprisoned, Grundy incorrectly deduces that the second Green Lantern's Earth must contain a second Solomon Grundy and crosses over from his Slaughter Swamp prison on Earth-Two to Earth-One where he overpowers that Earth's Superman before being tricked and stranded on the moon.

Solomon Grundy briefly works with the Injustice Society when the Fiddler retrieves Grundy from the moon of Earth-One to attack the JSA. The two defeat Hawkman and Wildcat before Grundy is thrown into a cooling volcano by Power Girl and Superman.

Grundy goes on to afflict Green Lantern and his teammates, including the Huntress who is the first female for whom he develops an affection. After Solomon Grundy is rescued from a glacier by Alan Scott's daughter, Jade, Grundy becomes loyal to her and, for a while, is an ally of Infinity, Inc. Eventually, this affectionate relationship turns tragic as the villainous Marcie Cooper, a.k.a. Harlequin of the Dummy's Injustice Unlimited, uses her illusion powers to disguise herself as Jade. Harlequin manipulates Grundy to attack the members of Infinity Inc., one by one. She convinces him to press the unconscious Mister Bones' bare hand against Skyman; since Bones's skin constantly exudes a cyanide-based compound, this quickly leads to Skyman's death. Once Grundy found out that Marcie had duped him, he savagely beat her within an inch of her life. This is the beginning of the end for Infinity Inc., and for Grundy's quasi-heroic career.

==== Earth-One version's history ====
When Earth-Two's Solomon Grundy visited Earth-One, he left behind some residual cells in the sewers. The Earth-One Solomon Grundy is born when the Parasite uses an enhanced crystal to metabolically hasten the growth of residual cells which becomes a new, much more bestial version. During a clash with Superman, it is determined that his might is too much for the Man of Steel, so Superman flies the monster to an alien world inhospitable to all save the hardiest life as the zombie propels himself through the air, mimicking his one-time adversary.

This version repeatedly plagues Superman for years until during an encounter wherein multiple Grundys are spawned, Superman and the Swamp Thing both encounter the Grundy clones. Soon, Superman obtains a compound from S.T.A.R. Labs which causes the Grundys to become inert, in effect killing the seemingly unkillable man-thing. The Swamp Thing attempts to cry out for Superman to stop as he believes Grundy to meet the definition of life, but the Swamp Thing is unable to express this due to his physical difficulty in speaking. This version of Grundy returns one final time, without explanation, leading a gang in the Earth-One Gotham City. He is apparently destroyed yet again when Batman tricks the creature into a blast furnace, where it is apparently consumed by the flames.

This version of Grundy was retroactively erased from history after the revamping of Superman in Crisis on Infinite Earths.

=== Post-Crisis ===
The post-Crisis version of Solomon Grundy has a similar history to his Earth-Two counterpart and debuts during the "Batman: The Long Halloween" storyline. Grundy and a newly disfigured Harvey Dent strike up an odd friendship after Dent escapes the slaughterhouse to plot his revenge on Carmine Falcone. Grundy also appears earlier in the story during Thanksgiving when Batman goes into the sewers to pursue a suspect who bombed Dent's house. Grundy attacks both of them, but Batman drives him off by blinding him with a shot of mace. Later as a somewhat humorous twist, Batman provides Solomon Grundy with a Thanksgiving dinner.

After Infinity, Inc. disbands, Solomon Grundy loses his loyalty towards Jade. A clash with Alan Scott and Jade in the pages of Green Lantern Corps Quarterly ends with Grundy turning into a statue of petrified wood. The heroes believe the threat of Grundy to have ended once and for all, but they are mistaken.

Shortly thereafter, Grundy reappears in Gotham in the pages of Batman: Shadow of the Bat, battling Batman once again and killing the female descendant of one of the killers of Cyrus Gold.

Grundy's next major appearance is in Starman, lurking in Opal City's sewers. Jack Knight befriends Grundy, who has become innocent and childlike. Grundy also becomes friends with previous Starman Mikaal Tomas, and dies while sacrificing himself to save Jack Knight from being crushed by a collapsing building. When Grundy appears again, he has returned to his malicious persona; the joint efforts of Jack Knight, Batman, Alan Scott, and Floronic Man are needed to stop him.

The origins of Grundy's resurrection come from the fact that the Parliament of Trees, a high council of Plant Elementals, tried to turn him into the newest Plant Elemental. However, the process was missing one vital piece: fire, as a Plant Elemental cannot be fully created unless it died in flames. Since Grundy's death did not involve fire at all, the process is not complete, and he becomes a sort of half-functional Plant Elemental. Grundy has been seemingly destroyed on several occasions, only to rise from the swamp again in a new incarnation. Each version of Grundy has been somewhat different from the last, depending on the medium used to dispatch him. Some have been truly evil; some much less so. Some versions are more mindless than others; some are moderately intelligent, recalling the literate, well-spoken monster of Mary Shelley's Frankenstein.

Grundy hides out for a time in the Arrowcave, the long-abandoned former headquarters of Green Arrow. While searching for artifacts of his former life, Oliver and his former ward, Roy Harper / Arsenal, stumble onto Grundy's new hideout. The story, accurately and humorously entitled "Grundy No Like Arrows in the Face!", is found in Green Arrow (vol. 3) #18. Green Arrow notes that this version seems much more violent, and manages to kill him by choking him with the string to his broken bow (despite the fact that Grundy does not have a heartbeat, functional veins, or need to breathe). In Green Arrow (vol. 3) #53, "Solomon's Revenge", Green Arrow helps Dr. Chrissie Cavendish, a S.T.A.R. Labs employee, who claims she is the great-great-granddaughter of the man the monster spawned from, to find and cure him. Her cure warps her into a monster much worse than Grundy. Green Arrow subdues the new monster, and leaves Grundy be. It is not known if Grundy is still using this building.

In the first issue of Grant Morrison's Seven Soldiers of Victory, Issue #0 of the same name, one of the Seven Unknown Men of Slaughter Swamp recounts the death of the miserly pedophile, Cyrus Gold, killed at the hands of an enraged mob, but also mentions that Gold could just as easily have been the innocent victim of a misunderstanding, as Slaughter Swamp is a point in space where time means nothing. In the final issue, the same Unknown Man punishes another of his group – the Eighth Man, Zor – by dressing him in Cyrus Gold's clothing and leaving him for the mob to find, implying that Zor – an extremely vain character, notable for attempting several times to overthrow the Universe and for having defeated The Spectre – would later become the first Solomon Grundy.

Grundy is manipulated by Gorilla Grodd via mind control into attacking Batman and Superman for Lex Luthor for the bounty of one billion dollars in Superman/Batman. Batman is able to stop Grundy.

While no specifics are given during the "Infinite Crisis" storyline, Solomon Grundy is also coerced into joining the Secret Society of Super Villains. He participates in the final strike against the Secret Six. Rag Doll encounters Grundy in a doorway. Rag Doll's scarred face relates to Grundy, and Grundy goes on to turn against the Secret Society. The aftermath of that battle is inconclusive, but Grundy evidently survives, as he was last seen in a murky swamp in JSA Classified. In it, he is convinced by Icicle to help Wizard, who is in trouble.

After helping Icicle free Johnny Sorrow from Prometheus' cosmic key, Grundy stays with the newly formed Injustice Society.

Solomon Grundy is seen fighting against the Blood Pack in the Battle of Metropolis, until he is vaporized by Superboy-Prime's heat vision, which apparently kills the Blood Pack and destroys Grundy's current incarnation.

In Brad Meltzer's Justice League of America, Grundy is reborn with intelligence after being killed in the Battle of Metropolis. He is revealed to be the mastermind behind the abduction of Red Tornado's robot body (it is revealed he gained this intelligence when he was reborn after being burned by Prime). Grundy expresses a desire to stop his cycle of dying and being reborn and so it appears he enlists the help of Professor Ivo to build him an Amazo body to live in forever. The Red Tornado kills Grundy with F5 tornado winds, ripping him apart.

Grundy appears in the Salvation Run mini-series as one of the villains exiled to another planet. He is killed during a battle with Parademons. His body, awaiting its inevitable resurrection, is left behind when the villains leave the Hell Planet. However, when the villains exit, Grundy's hand trembles, accompanied with a groaning sound.

In the one-shot Faces of Evil: Solomon Grundy (March 2009) by Geoff Johns and Scott Kolins, Cyrus Gold returns to life in Slaughter Swamp, as he was prior to becoming Grundy. He returns to Gotham City, but is shot by police after attacking a charity worker. In the police morgue, he transforms into Solomon Grundy. Grundy is once more an unintelligent monster, repeating the opening line of the nursery rhyme. A week later, having retreated to the sewers, he has a fight with Killer Croc. At the end of the fight, exhausted, he reverts to Cyrus Gold again. He finds himself in front of his own grave, where the Phantom Stranger tells him he has seven days to undo his curse, as "There is an unholy night coming, as black as the dead's blood. And it's best if Solomon Grundy was not around for it" (a reference to the upcoming Blackest Night storyline). Alan Scott serves as his reluctant guide, as the story continues in the Solomon Grundy miniseries.

In the countdown to Blackest Night, Cyrus Gold was given one week to discover the truth of who murdered him, so he could repent for all of his sins and gain absolution. Alan Scott and the Phantom Stranger were given as his guides throughout the week, while Etrigan was trying to take him to Hell. Gold had a habit of getting killed. No matter how much damage was done to his body, he resurrected as a complete Solomon Grundy, driven to kill. Eventually it is revealed that Gold committed suicide, meaning he forced the curse of Solomon Grundy on himself. The end of the series' run shows Grundy reanimated as a Black Lantern, and Cyrus Gold in hell. Grundy then tracks down and attacks Bizarro, using a past friendship they had to stir up the creature's emotions. Bizarro eventually defeats Grundy by flying him into the sun, incinerating him and his power ring.

=== DC Rebirth ===
The Prime Earth Solomon Grundy is introduced in DC Rebirth. His appearance resembles that of his pre-Flashpoint depictions. Grundy is briefly seen fighting Arkillo of the Sinestro Corps and Saint Walker of the Blue Lantern Corps.

The sorceress Selena created a mindless clone of Grundy from his DNA sample to serve as the muscle for the Fatal Five and fought Supergirl. The clone was defeated by fellow Fatal Five member Indigo.

In the storyline "The New Golden Age" storyline, Grundy is among the recruits considered to join Huntress's Justice Society. Salem the Witch Girl tries to regress Solomon Grundy to his original human self, only for her curse to reduce him to a skeleton. After resurrecting, Grundy joins the Justice Society of America in fighting Gentleman Ghost.

In the series JSA, Solomon Grundy appears as a member of Scandal Savage's Injustice Society.

== Powers and abilities ==
Solomon Grundy has superhuman strength and stamina. He is virtually indestructible and immortal thanks to the elemental energy that imbues his form with pseudo-life. He is nearly invulnerable to physical, magical, and energy attacks; he's also not affected by fire or low temperatures. Grundy has proven highly resistant to the effects of the original Green Lantern's power ring (which is attributed to his part-plant essence; originally because he had absorbed plant matter from the swamp, and later because he was a partial "plant elemental" like Swamp Thing).

Grundy possesses a healing factor. While he has occasionally been destroyed, he has always returned to life sooner or later, though often with different personalities and powers. A few of which begat chlorokinesis from absorbing The Sentinel's ring energies, high intellect to complement his raw power, and pieces of his flesh fermenting into full-grown clones of the monster. In his earliest appearances, he could convert the area surrounding him into a bog similar to his respawn site.

== Other versions ==
=== Absolute Universe ===
An alternate universe version of Solomon Grundy appears in the Absolute Universe series Absolute Green Arrow. This version is a monstrous test subject created through Hector Hammond's experiments with Miraclo. After Hammond's operations are uncovered, he orders Grundy to attack Dinah Lance, Roy Harper, and the two vigilantes operating as the Green Arrow Killer: Malcolm Merlyn and Connor Hawke. Grundy fatally wounds Merlyn before being killed by Dinah, who detonates a gas tank embedded in his body.

=== Amalgam Comics ===
The Skulk, an amalgamation of Solomon Grundy and the Marvel Comics character the Hulk, appears in the Amalgam Comics universe.

=== Earth 2 ===
An alternate universe version of Solomon Grundy from Earth-Two appears in The New 52. This version is the champion of the Grey, a cosmic force connecting fungal life, who previously worked in a slaughterhouse before foreman Henry Pittance raped his wife Pinney Grundy, who committed suicide shortly after, leading him to kill everyone in the facility and then himself.

=== Earth-Three ===
A heroic, British counterpart of Solomon Grundy from Earth-Three appears in JLA Secret Files and Origins (2004).

=== Emperor Joker ===
An alternate universe version of Solomon Grundy who became the warden of Arkham Asylum appears in the Emperor Joker storyline.

=== Flashpoint ===
An alternate universe version of Solomon Grundy appears in Flashpoint. This version is a member of the Creature Commandos under General Sam Lane's command.

=== Grundymen ===
The Grundymen, a group of zombies inspired by Solomon Grundy, appear in Seven Soldiers.

=== Huntress' possible future ===
An alternate timeline version of Solomon Grundy appears in The New Golden Age as a member of the Huntress' Justice Society of America.

=== Justice Riders ===
An alternate universe version of Solomon Grundy appears in Justice Riders.

== In other media ==
=== Television ===
==== Live-action ====
- Solomon Grundy appears in Legends of the Superheroes, portrayed by Mickey Morton. This version is a member of the Legion of Doom.
- Solomon Grundy makes a cameo appearance in the Smallville episode "Prophecy", portrayed by John DeSantis. This version is a member of Toyman's Marionette Ventures.
- Cyrus Gold appears in the second season of Arrow, portrayed by Graham Shiels. This version goes by the alias of The Acolyte and is a member of Brother Blood's Church of Blood who was injected with "Mirakuru" serum in an attempt to replicate the process that granted Slade Wilson his abilities, gaining superhuman strength and endurance in the process. After attacking Queen Consolidated's Applied Sciences division to steal a centrifuge for Blood's plans, Gold eventually battles the Arrow, who kills him.
- Solomon Grundy appears in Gotham, portrayed by Drew Powell. This version was born Cyrus Gold and is initially known as Butch Gilzean, a mob enforcer working for Fish Mooney. Throughout the first three seasons, he is employed by Oswald Cobblepot, Tabitha Galavan, and Barbara Kean until Kean kills Gilzean during the third season finale for attempting to betray her. In the fourth season, the corrupt administrators of the hospital where Gilzean's body ended up dump him in Slaughter Swamp, where chemical waste from the Indian Hill facility transforms him into a pale, zombie-like creature with regenerative capabilities and superhuman strength. Suffering amnesia, he adopts the name "Solomon Grundy" after hearing a group of people playing a record of the nursery rhyme and is recruited by Edward Nygma to serve as his enforcer until Galavan jogs Gilzean's memory. Gilzean later allies with Cobblepot, who promises to help make him human again before killing him to emotionally cripple Galavan as revenge for her killing his mother years prior.
- Solomon Grundy appears in Stargirl, voiced by an uncredited actor. Throughout the first season, he serves as an enforcer for the Injustice Society of America (ISA), taking part in their attack on the Justice Society of America (JSA) and killing Hourman and his wife before they could interfere with the ISA's plans years prior to the series while being kept in a reinforced cell underneath The American Dream's corporate headquarters to keep him under control. In the present, Hourman's son Rick Tyler takes up his father's mantle to seek revenge on Grundy, but ultimately spares him in the first season finale under the condition that the latter never returns. In the second season, Grundy returns, breaking into restaurants for food. To avoid further incidents, Rick leaves food for him in the forest, leading to Grundy seeing him as a friend. Grundy later assists Rick and Stargirl's JSA in fighting Eclipso, only to be killed in battle. Afterward, Rick buries Grundy, though Shade assures the former that the latter will eventually come back to life in the right place and time. By the series finale, Grundy was resurrected and joined the JSA.

==== Animation ====
- Solomon Grundy appears in Challenge of the Superfriends, voiced by Jimmy Weldon. This version is a member of Lex Luthor's Legion of Doom who speaks broken English in a Southern accent and was revived by energy from a monolith.
- Solomon Grundy appears in the Super Friends episode "Revenge of Doom", voiced again by Jimmy Weldon. This version is a member of the Legion of Doom.
- Solomon Grundy appears in series set in the DC Animated Universe (DCAU):
  - Grundy first appears in Justice League, voiced by Mark Hamill. This version was a mobster from the 1920s who was resurrected as a monster and seeks his lost soul without being aware of it. Initially appearing as a member of Lex Luthor and Aresia's Injustice Gangs, Grundy eventually redeems himself after befriending Hawkgirl and helps her and Doctor Fate stop Ichthultu at the cost of his own life.
  - Grundy returns in the Justice League Unlimited episode "Wake the Dead", whose vocal effects are done by Bruce Timm. After being possessed and resurrected with amnesia by an unnamed demon summoned by three young amateur sorcerers, Grundy battles Amazo and the Justice League before being thrown down a sewer by Hawkgirl, who reluctantly kills him with her mace.
- Solomon Grundy appears in The Batman episode "Grundy's Night", voiced by Kevin Grevioux. This version was created by the working-class citizens of 19th-century Gotham City to wreak havoc on the rich landowners that polluted the local lake with industrial waste and converted it into Gotham Swamp. Ever since, local legend states that Grundy would rise again on a Halloween night with a total lunar eclipse to seek revenge on the landowners' descendants.
- Solomon Grundy appears in Batman: The Brave and the Bold, voiced by Diedrich Bader. This version is a crime lord who is mostly unintelligible due to his mouth being stitched shut, though his right-hand man Weasel is capable of understanding and translating for him.
- Solomon Grundy appears in the Robot Chicken DC Comics Special. This version is a member of the Legion of Doom who was actually born on a Tuesday, with his real name being Solomon Gruesday as a result.
- Solomon Grundy appears in the "Super Best Friends Forever" segment of DC Nation Shorts, voiced by Keith Ferguson.
- Solomon Grundy appears in DC Super Friends, voiced by Richard Epcar.
- Solomon Grundy appears in Justice League Action, voiced by Fred Tatasciore.
- Solomon Grundy makes non-speaking cameo appearances in Harley Quinn and Kite Man: Hell Yeah! as a member of the Legion of Doom.
- Solomon Grundy appears in the DC Super Hero Girls (2019) two-part episode "#NightmareInGotham", voiced again by Fred Tatasciore.
- A truck called Grundy appears in the "Monster Truck Amok" episode of Batwheels voiced by Fred Tatasciore. Initially appearing to be randomly destroying, Grundy is in reality in pain from a nail stuck in his tire as reference to "Androcles and the Lion".
- Solomon Grundy appears in Bat-Fam, voiced again by Fred Tatasciore.

=== Film ===
- Solomon Grundy appears in Superman/Batman: Public Enemies, voiced by an uncredited Corey Burton.
- Solomon Grundy appears in JLA Adventures: Trapped in Time, voiced by Kevin Michael Richardson. This version is a member of the Legion of Doom.
- Solomon Grundy appears in Batman Unlimited: Monster Mayhem, voiced again by Fred Tatasciore.
- Solomon Grundy appears in Justice League vs. Teen Titans, voiced by an uncredited Rick D. Wasserman. This version is a member of the Legion of Doom.
- An alternate reality incarnation of Cyrus Gold appears in Batman: Gotham by Gaslight, voiced by David Forseth.
- Solomon Grundy appears in Lego DC Batman: Family Matters, voiced again by Fred Tatasciore.
- Solomon Grundy makes a non-speaking appearance in Injustice.
- Solomon Grundy appears in films set in the Tomorrowverse:
  - Grundy is introduced in Batman: The Long Halloween, voiced again by Fred Tatasciore. This version is only capable of reciting his nursery rhyme and inspired Harvey Dent to become Two-Face.
  - Grundy appears in Legion of Super-Heroes, voiced by Darin De Paul.
  - Grundy makes a non-speaking appearance in Justice League: Crisis on Infinite Earths.
- Solomon Grundy appears in Catwoman: Hunted, voiced by Steve Blum. This version is a member of Leviathan.
- Solomon Grundy appears in Teen Titans Go! & DC Super Hero Girls: Mayhem in the Multiverse, voiced again by Fred Tatasciore. This version is a member of the Legion of Doom.
- Solomon Grundy appears in Scooby-Doo! and Krypto, Too!, voiced again by Fred Tatasciore.

=== Video games ===
- Solomon Grundy appears in DC Universe Online, voiced by David Jennison. This version is a thrall of Poison Ivy.
- Solomon Grundy appears as a playable character in Injustice: Gods Among Us, voiced again by Fred Tatasciore. In an alternate reality, he is press-ganged into becoming a member of High Councilor Superman's Regime.
- Solomon Grundy appears as a character summon in Scribblenauts Unmasked: A DC Comics Adventure.
- Solomon Grundy appears as a playable character in Infinite Crisis, voiced again by Fred Tatasciore.
- Solomon Grundy appears as a playable character in Lego Batman 3: Beyond Gotham, voiced again by Fred Tatasciore.
- Solomon Grundy makes a cameo appearance as a non-player character (NPC) in Injustice 2 via the Arkham Asylum stage.
- Solomon Grundy appears as a playable character in Lego DC Super-Villains, voiced again by Fred Tatasciore. This version is a member of the Legion of Doom.
- Solomon Grundy makes a cameo appearance as a non-player character (NPC) in Lego Batman: Legacy of the Dark Knight.

==== Batman: Arkham ====
Solomon Grundy appears as a boss in the Batman: Arkham franchise, voiced by Fred Tatasciore.

- First appearing in Batman: Arkham City, this version was a merchant who was murdered and had his body dumped in Slaughter Swamp, which was later discovered to be a Lazarus Pit. After being exposed to a strange thunderstorm, the Pit resurrected him as a nigh-immortal zombie-like monster. He temporarily became part of a traveling circus before being found by Ra's al Ghul, who realized the swamp's true nature and took him to Wonder City. Seeking to understand the Pit's power, Ra's repeatedly murdered Grundy until Wonder City was eventually shut down and Gotham City built over it, with the Iceberg Lounge being built over Grundy's prison. After the Penguin finds him, he uses Grundy to kill traitorous underlings and attempts to kill Batman, who eventually defeats Grundy.
- Grundy appears in Batman: Arkham City Lockdown and Batman: Arkham Origins Blackgate.

=== Music ===
- The Crash Test Dummies reference Solomon Grundy in "Superman's Song", which came about because lead singer Brad Roberts could not think of a supervillain whose name rhymed with "money".
- An underground rap album, Colton Grundy: The Undying, featured a temporary redux of rapper Blaze Ya Dead Homie's identity. The album describes the story of an immortal casket-maker by the name of Solomon who jumped into a freezing river, awakened in the 1990s, transformed into Blaze, and eventually into the eponymous Colton Grundy.
- A band named after Solomon Grundy was formed in the late 1980s as a side project of the Screaming Trees, with Van Conner being featured as the lead singer on their self-titled New Alliance Records release.
- Brownsville rapper Sean Price has a track titled "Solomon Grundy" on his album Mic Tyson.

=== Miscellaneous ===
- Solomon Grundy appears in The Batman Strikes! #19.
- A hologram of Solomon Grundy appears in DC Super Friends: The Joker's Playhouse.
- The DCAU incarnation of Solomon Grundy appears in Superman Beyond #4. As of the future setting of DCAU series Batman Beyond, Grundy has become a powerful crime boss called Mr. Stone operating out of the Vanity nightclub in Metropolis, who later receives nanotechnology from Lex Luthor's daughter Lucinda.
- The Arrow incarnation of Cyrus Gold appears in the tie-in novel Arrow: Vengeance, in which it is revealed that he and Sebastian Blood knew each other from a young age and studied under preacher and the Church of Blood's founder, Father Roger Trigon. Later in life, Gold succeeded Trigon as preacher and head of the Zandia Orphanage.
- The Injustice incarnation of Solomon Grundy appears in the Injustice: Gods Among Us prequel comic. He is initially incarcerated in Arkham Asylum before Lex Luthor brainwashes him into serving Superman's Regime.
- Solomon Grundy appears in Batman '66 #23. This version was a wealthy Olympic wrestler who served Marsha, Queen of Diamonds, before she eventually forgot about him and left him to die. In the present, Marsha's aunt Hilda reanimates Grundy until Batman and Robin defeat him.
- Solomon Grundy appears in DC Super Hero Girls (2015), voiced again by Fred Tatasciore.
- Several clones of the Batman: Arkham incarnation of Solomon Grundy created by Calendar Man appear in the Batman: Arkham Knight prequel comic.

== See also ==
- List of Green Lantern enemies
- List of Batman family enemies
- List of Superman enemies
