= The Middletons =

American comic strip by Ralph Dunagin and Dana Summers

- Author(s): Ralph Dunagin and Dana Summers
- Current status/schedule: Current daily & Sunday strip
- Launch date: November 3, 1986; 39 years ago
- Syndicate(s): Tribune Content Agency
- Genre(s): Humor, Gag-a-day

The Middletons is an American comic strip created by Ralph Dunagin and Dana Summers. The strip debuted on November 3, 1986, in the Orlando Sentinel. Originally distributed by News America Syndicate, it moved to North America Syndicate in 1987 and then Tribune Content Agency in 1994. Set in Middletown, it features a suburban American family and their neighbors.

== Cast ==
- Morris Robert Dale "Apopka Papa" Middleton used to be an athlete, but now he must accept, reluctantly, that he is getting older. He was born in Apopka, Florida. He also coached a Pop Warner football team for several years until he was fired by his mother Beatrice on January 30, 2011. Morris' father was Walter.
- Midge "The Nuthatch" Middleton (née Keller) raised two children and then went back to work as a middle school principal. Hometown: Tullahoma, Tennessee.
- Kate Middleton is in her 20s and works in a barbecue restaurant despite having a college degree. According to the June 19, 2011 strip, her grandmother has claimed she was Princess Kate.
- Beatrice Edna Mary "Gunny Granny" Middleton (née Duke) is Morris's sweet, elderly, nasty, snappy, and feisty mom who lives with the family. She is tough and mean. She is 85 years old. Her hometown is Immokalee, Florida. Her nickname is "Gunny Granny" (she was a Marine Corps Gunnery Sergeant from 1945 to 1972). She is a 6th degree black belt in MCMAP. Her motto is: "A gunny granny's gotta do what a gunny granny's gotta do." She also likes exercise and fitness, often working out for hours at a time. She can often be seen in a blue sweat suit and pink sneakers. She now coaches her son Morris's youth football team, having recently fired him from it. She was a member of Kappa Kappa Gamma sorority, Delta Beta chapter, Duke University. Her longtime boyfriend is Hector J. Hanley, Jr., M.D. She was married to Walter.
- Bumper, the Middletons' family pet; a bulldog whose bark is much worse than his bite. Left to Morris by his football coach. Named because he brought home a bumper from a 1972 Chevrolet. Known to talk to other dogs, especially his best buddy Rusty.
- Ernest Wade is African-American and the best friend to Morris.
- Peg Wade
- Wilson Wade
- Wendie Wade
- Diego, Wilson's best friend
- Grimes, who owns Grimes Auto Parts but has another job with a boss.
- Hector has dated Beatrice.
- Rambo, the Wades' cat
- Barnaby, a tuxedo cat who is new to town.
- Wormy, Grimes' dog.
