= Inbraak =

- Directed by: Alfred Mazure
- Release date: 1942
- Country: Netherlands
- Language: Dutch

Inbraak is a 1942 Dutch film directed by Alfred Mazure. It was based on his own comic strip Dick Bos and the first cinematic adaptation of this popular series.

== Cast ==
- Maurice van Nieuwenhuizen - Dick Bos
- Alfred Mazure
- Piet van der Ham
