= Moord in het Modehuis =

- Directed by: Alfred Mazure
- Release date: 1946
- Country: Netherlands
- Language: Dutch

Moord in het Modehuis is a 1946 Dutch film directed by Alfred Mazure. It was based on his own comic strip Dick Bos and the third cinematic adaptation of this popular series.

== Cast ==
- Maurice van Nieuwenhuizen ... Dick Bos
- Adolphe Engers ... Keukenchef
- Alfred Mazure
- George Mazure
- Piet Leenhouls ... Nemesis
- Mia Bolleurs
- Piet van der Ham
