= Celebrity Sports Center =

Entertainment center near Denver, Colorado

- An early promotional illustration of the signature Celebrity Sports Center building and sign.
- Type: Private
- Industry: Entertainment/Restaurant
- Founded: 1960; 66 years ago in Glendale, Colorado
- Founder: Walt Disney and other celebrity investors
- Defunct: 1994; 32 years ago
- Headquarters: Metropolitan Denver
- Number of locations: 1
- Key people: Bob Leavitt and Neil Griffin, last owners
- Number of employees: 169

Celebrity Sports Center (CSC or Celebrity's) was a family-oriented entertainment business and landmark in metropolitan Denver. Celebrity's was located in Glendale, Colorado at 888 South Colorado Boulevard near East Kentucky Avenue. It opened in 1960 and operated continuously for 34 years before closing in 1994. The original investors included Walt Disney, his brother Roy, Jack Benny, Bing Crosby, George Burns, Charles Laughton, Burl Ives, Art Linkletter, John Payne, Spike Jones and Jim and Marian Jordan (Fibber McGee and Molly).

There are some sources that suggest Walt Disney Company used the business as a training facility for its employees prior to deployment to Disney World.

Walt Disney and the original investors built the Celebrity's complex at a cost of $6 million. The bowling lanes opened first in 1960 and the rest of the center opened in 1961.

In 1979, a group of private investors led by Bob Leavitt and Neil Griffin purchased Celebrity's for $1.9 million. The three signature water slides that were visible from outside of the building were added after Leavitt/Griffin purchase.

In the early 1990s, Celebrity's was losing money and apparently in need of significant maintenance. In 1994, the complex was sold to Acquisition Corporation of the Rockies for $10.8 million, a subsidiary of Trammell Crow Company. The new owner demolished Celebrity's by March 1995. Today the 7.1-acre (29,000 m^{2}) site is a Home Depot store and retail space.

== Features ==
Celebrity's was home to 80 bowling lanes, more than 300 video games and pinball machines spread across three arcades, a 50-meter pool with three water slides, a billiard room, a full-service restaurant, the "Hofbräu" bar, bumper-car rides and a shooting gallery which were located in the "Fun Center" game room downstairs, the largest of the 3 arcade rooms, where there were ticketed games such as Skee ball or Boom ball to play for prizes . There were also 3 complete slot car tracks in the basement.

== Bowling ==
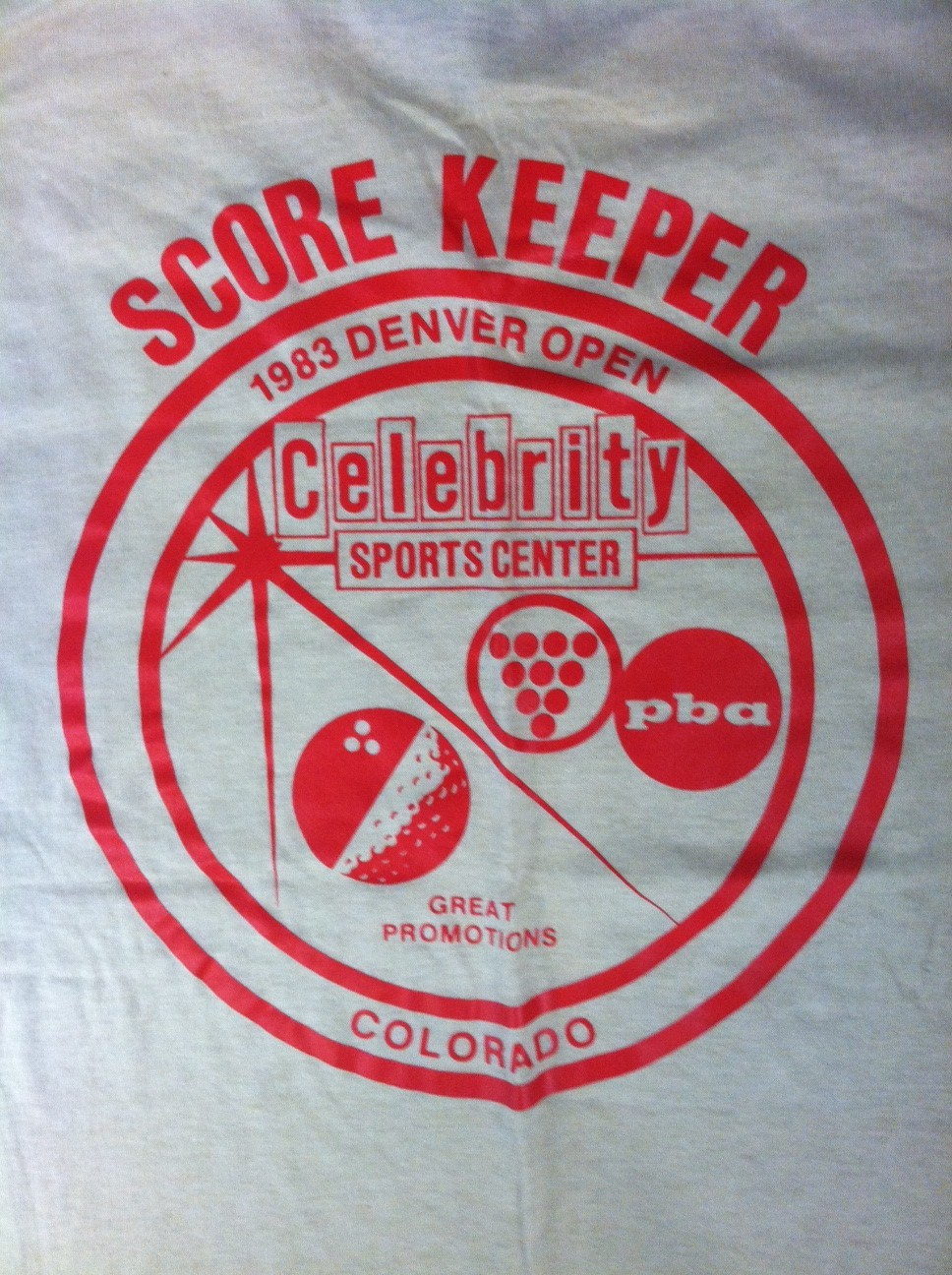
A bowling T-shirt from 1983.

In the spring of 1991, the Celebrity Sports Center played host to the $125,000 Celebrity Denver Open for the Professional Bowlers Association Tour from May 21 to May 25. The final round of the tournament was televised live on ESPN. Left-hander John Mazza would go into the TV Finals with a 299-pin lead over the second-place qualifier Parker Bohn III. Curtis Odom qualified 3rd, Bryan Goebel 4th, and Mike Shady would take the 5th and final seed. The opening match saw Shady squeak out a narrow victory over fourth-seed Goebel with a score of 184-173. He followed up that victory with a 212-199 win over Odom, but he would fall to Bohn III in the third match of the show, 226-204. In the championship match, Bohn III was simply unable to find a consistent line to the pocket to score. As a result, he was defeated easily by the number-one seed Mazza, who threw 10 out of 12 possible strikes in a lopsided 269-190 victory to win the first-place prize of $18,000.

== Legacy ==
CSC still evokes fond memories from many metropolitan Denver natives. The Denver Post called Celebrity Sports Center a "huge indoor funland," a landmark "uniquely Denver," and noted its demolition left a "void...that cannot be filled." Some tributes to CSC can still be found online. One such tribute even notes that CSC souvenirs and paraphernalia continue to appear on auction websites from time to time, and seem to sell for high prices.

Patrons often remember the iconic sign that stood outside Celebrity's. At least one of the 14-point stars from the sign has been preserved. Today it is used as a winter holiday decoration at the Lumber Baron Inn & Gardens in Denver.

Additionally, the old bowling lanes at Celebrity's were preserved. Those lanes were reused during the restoration of the 19th-century Oxford Hotel in downtown Denver and now serve as the hotel's ballroom floor.

Early plans for the redevelopment of the site included a brass plaque to be "mounted somewhere on the new site to commemorate Celebrity's existence as the entertainment mecca that it was." The fate of this proposed plaque is unclear.

(Pre-Home Depot the building housed a Builders Square location, which had an encased bowling pin from the CSC and a plaque underneath it by the far left exit door. These mementos no longer exist at the Home Depot; the fate of the pin and the plaque are unknown.)
