= Dana Summers =

American cartoonist

Dana Summers is an American editorial cartoonist and comic strip creator, whose work is syndicated by Tribune Content Agency. His editorial cartoons are published in the Orlando Sentinel, usually reflecting a conservative opinion. He also created the Bound and Gagged comic strip, and co-wrote The Middletons with Ralph Dunagin.

== Biography ==
Summers was born in Lawrence, Massachusetts. He graduated from The Art Institute of Boston in 1971. He began his career as an editorial cartoonist, first as a freelancer, then with The Fayetteville (North Carolina) Times, and then with the Dayton (Ohio) Journal Herald (now the Dayton Daily News). In 1982 he joined the Orlando Sentinel, where he has received several awards for his work, including from the Overseas Press Club and the Sigma Delta Chi Society of Professional Journalists.

Summers' editorial cartoons have been in syndication since 1985.
