= Dick Bos =

Dick Bos was a Dutch detective comics series, published between 1940 and 1967 on irregular basis by Alfred Mazure. It was one of the most popular comic series in the Netherlands in the 1940s and still highly regarded as a classic.

== Concept ==
Dick Bos is a brave private investigator who is a master in jiujitsu and therefore used his fists a lot. Many stories follow him as he solves cases and has lengthy fight sequences in which thieves and crooks are beaten up.

== History ==
In 1940, Alfred Mazure created Dick Bos, which he signed with Maz. The comics were very popular with the youth because during the Nazi occupation all American and British comics were banned and therefore Dutch magazines had to rely on home-made comics to sustain reader's interest. Yet in 1942 even Dick Bos got banned because Mazure refused to turn the comic into a Nazi propaganda strip, despite requests of the Nazi publishing company Ullstein. Mazure also made five low-budget films based on Dick Bos, which were shot and edited between 1942 and 1946. Two of these were Inbraak (1942) and Moord in het Modehuis (1946).

After the Netherlands were liberated in 1944, Dick Bos was allowed publication again. Yet they caused a severe media scare over their rather violent content. Dutch Minister of Education, Culture and Science Theo Rutten eventually sent a circular among schools to discourage distribution of "violent comics". As a result, many comics in the Netherlands were only allowed if they were published in text comics format (which still allowed children to read more) and if the content was child-friendly. Mazure was therefore forced to quit Dick Bos, since magazines and newspapers were no longer willing to publish violent comics.

Between 1963 and 1967, when media censorship against comics loosened, Mazure drew new adventures of Dick Bos and made two animated short films based on the character.

== Parody ==
René Windig and Eddie de Jong parodied Dick Bos as Dick Bosch.
