= Jim Ivey =

American editorial cartoonist and comics historian

- Born: James Burnett Ivey; April 15, 1925 Chattanooga, Tennessee, U.S.
- Died: July 14, 2022 (aged 97) Greater Orlando, Florida
- Areas: Cartoonist, historian, teacher, collector
- Notable works: OrlandoCon; Thoughts of Man; Roy Crane's Wash Tubbs – The First Adventure Comic Strip
- Awards: National Cartoonists Society Silver T-Square (1979)

Jim Ivey (Apr. 15, 1925 – July 14, 2022) was an American editorial cartoonist, cartoon-art collector, comics historian, publisher, teacher, and convention organizer. He worked for four major U.S. newspapers, founded one of the earliest galleries devoted to original cartoon art, co-founded OrlandoCon, and published several works on the history of cartooning.

Ivey was known for his outsized personality, soft-spoken Southern drawl, bow tie, handlebar mustache, and dedication to the art and history of cartooning.

== Early life and education ==
Born April 15, 1925, in Chattanooga, Tennessee, Ivey "split" from his family at a young age, living instead with relatives. He spent a lot of time outdoors.

During World War II, he served in the United States Navy aboard a submarine from 1943 to 1946.

Thanks to the G.I. Bill, Ivey studied at the University of Louisville, George Washington University, and the National Art School in Washington, D.C., and also took correspondence courses with the Landon School of Illustration and Cartooning.

== Career ==
=== Editorial cartooning ===
After his war service, including a Reid Fellowship to study in Europe, Ivey worked in the editorial art departments of The Washington Star and St. Petersburg Times. After seven years at the St. Petersburg Times, he joined the San Francisco Examiner from 1959 to 1966, then freelanced until 1970, when he became an editorial cartoonist at the Orlando Sentinel (a position he held for seven years).

In his editorial cartooning, Ivey eschewed the standard elements of grease-pencil shading and labeling, instead relying on minimalistic lines and trusting the reader to follow the ideas.

Ivey began drawing the syndicated daily gag panel Thoughts of Man in 1973 for the Chicago Tribune New York News Syndicate. The panel featured quotations from famous people collected by William Summers, matched with cartoon portraits by Ivey. The panel is documented in printed sources through at least 1980, although the exact end date of its syndication is not clearly documented.

From 2007 to 2016, Ivey produced a weekly one-page comic strip for Stripper's Guide called Jim Ivey's Sunday Comics (which included a series called "My Other Life"). The strips, nearly 400 in total, were informal, often autobiographical, and showcased Ivey's minimalist cartooning style.

He was active in the National Cartoonists Society (serving as regional chairman) and in 1979 received its Silver T-Square Award.

=== The Cartoon Museum ===
In 1967, Ivey founded The Cartoon Museum in Madeira Beach, Florida, considered one of the earliest galleries devoted to displaying and selling original cartoon art. The gallery featured historical cartoon originals and later incorporated retail sales of new and vintage comic books.

After relocating to Orlando, Ivey continued to operate the Cartoon Museum throughout the 1970s and 1980s. The shop served as a gallery, meeting place, and informal teaching space for local cartoonists and collectors.

=== OrlandoCon ===
In 1974, Ivey co-founded OrlandoCon with Charlie Roberts, Rob Word, and others. The convention combined comic book fandom with guests from across the cartooning professions. Ivey invited editorial cartoonists, newspaper strip cartoonists, animators, and other professionals to OrlandoCon, treating them "like royalty," including hosting a cartoonists-only dinner and roast and handing out (the first iteration of) the Ignatz Award.

OrlandoCon ran annually for more than twenty years, with Ivey remaining a central organizer.

=== Publishing and scholarship ===
In the 1950s and 1960s, Ivey wrote a series of articles about European editorial cartoonists that appeared in Freedom & Union, a political journal edited by Clarence Streit. He also wrote articles on the history of comic strips for such publications as The World of Comic Art, Nemo, and Hogan's Alley.

Ivey published or co-published several works related to comics history:

- Roy Crane's Wash Tubbs – The First Adventure Comic Strip. New York: Luna Press. 1974. — co-assembled with Gordon Campbell and featuring a foreword by Charles M. Schulz
- The magazines cARToon and later CartooNews (Note: Not to be confused with CARtoons Magazine.) in the 1970s
- Graphic Shorthand. Lulu. Sep 29, 2011. — instructional book published when Ivey was close to age 90

=== Teaching and mentorship ===
From 1978 to 1983, Ivey was an adjunct professor at the University of Central Florida, teaching a course called Art of Cartooning. He also taught cartooning at Rollins College and the Crealdé School of Art, and held informal classes and workshops at The Cartoon Museum.

He mentored young cartoonists and collectors, sometimes giving out stacks of Sunday comics tearsheets to encourage the study of older newspaper comics rather than only contemporary comic books.

=== Later life ===
After the collapse of the mid-1990s comic book market, Ivey closed the Cartoon Museum and later operated a used bookstore. He also worked as a professional clipper and archivist for comics historian Allan Holtz.

== Personal life and death ==
According to his comic-strip memoir, Ivey was married and had a daughter in the period 1945–1955, and had a son in the period 1955–1965. In his 70s he spent a lot of time at Lake Harris, northwest of Orlando.

In later years, he lived in assisted-living facilities, remaining dedicated to reading and the comics community. Ivey spent his final years in the Greater Orlando area, under the care of his longtime friend and caregiver Joy Lal. He died on July 14, 2022, at the age of 97.

His ashes were to be scattered at sea by the U.S. Navy in accordance with his wishes.
