= Bound and Gagged (comic strip) =

Syndicated comic strip

Bound And Gagged is a one-panel comic strip drawn by Dana Summers and syndicated by Tribune Content Agency. It began on March 30, 1992.
