= Knockout (comics) =

In comics, Knockout may refer to:

- Knockout (British comics), a 1939-1963 British comic
- Knockout (1971 comic), a 1971-1973 British comic
- Knockout (DC Comics), a DC Comics character
- Knockout, a member of Marvel Comics' Femme Fatales
- Codename: Knockout, a Vertigo series
