= Alfred Mazure =

- Born: 8 September 1914 Nijmegen, Netherlands
- Died: 16 February 1974 (aged 59) London, England
- Areas: Cartoonist, Writer, Artist
- Notable works: Dick Bos, Romeo Brown

Alfred Leonardus Mazure (8 September 1914 – 16 February 1974) was a Dutch comics artist, novelist and film director, best known for his detective comic Dick Bos, which was one of the most popular comics series in the Netherlands during the 1940s. He also published English-language comics for several British newspapers, including his second-best-known work Romeo Brown.

== Biography ==
Alfred Mazure was born in Nijmegen in 1914. His first comic strips, De Chef (1934–1935), Da's juist iets voor Willy (1935), Jerry gaat speculeeren (1937) and De Havik in Londen (1937) were published in the newspapers De Utrechtsche Courant, the Limburger Koerier and the Dagblad van Noordbrabant (en Zeeland). In 1939 he also published his first comics in Great Britain, namely Erbert (1937–1938) in the weekly Passing Show and Dad in John Bull.

In 1940 he created his famous detective comic Dick Bos, which he signed with Maz. They starred a brave private investigator, Dick Bos, who was a master in jiujitsu and therefore used his fists a lot. The comics were very popular with the youth because during the Nazi occupation all American and British comics were banned and therefore Dutch magazines had to rely on home-made comics to sustain readers' interest. Yet in 1942 even Dick Bos got banned because Mazure refused to turn the comic into a Nazi propaganda strip, despite requests of the Nazi publishing company Ullstein Verlag. Mazure also made five low-budget films based on Dick Bos, which were shot and edited between 1942 and 1946. Two of these were Inbraak (1942) and Moord in het Modehuis (1946).

After the Netherlands were liberated in 1944 Dick Bos was allowed publication again. Yet they caused a severe media scare over their rather violent content. Dutch Minister of Education, Culture and Science Theo Rutten eventually sent a circular among schools to discourage distribution of "violent comics". As a result many comics in the Netherlands were only allowed if they were published in text comics format (which still allowed children to read more) and if the content was child-friendly. Mazure was therefore forced to quit Dick Bos, since no magazine or newspaper wanted to publish violent comics any longer.

Mazure moved to the United Kingdom after the war and naturalized himself as a British citizen. He made several English-language comics, such as Sam Stone (1948–1950) and Bruce Bunter (1948–1950) for the Daily Herald and Romeo Brown (1954–1957) and Jane, daughter of Jane (1961–1963)—a spin-off of Norman Pett's Jane—for the Daily Mirror. In the Daily Sketch he published Carmen & Co (1957–1959), while Lindy Leigh (1967–1970) saw print in Mayfair. For the Sunday Graphic he made a comic strip adaptation of the British TV series The Larkins, while he also adapted the TV soap Crossroads (1972–1973) for TVTimes.

Between 1963 and 1967, when media censorship against comics loosened, Mazure drew new adventures of Dick Bos and made two animated short films based on the character. He was also active as a novelist, writing about the female secret agent Sherazad and detective Ape Dragoner, while also penning down more humoristic titles, erotic stories and travel stories. He died in 1974.
