= Romeo Brown =

British comic strip in the Daily Mail

Creative team
- Written by: Alfred Mazure, Peter O'Donnell
- Artist(s): Alfred Mazure, Jim Holdaway

Romeo Brown was a British comic strip published in the Daily Mirror from 1954 to 1962.

It was originally written and illustrated by Alfred Mazure; Mazure was replaced in 1957 by writer Peter O'Donnell and illustrator Jim Holdaway. It featured the adventures of Romeo Brown, a dashing private detective and reluctant ladies' man. The strip was cancelled unexpectedly by the chairman of the group who, according to O'Donnell, said he couldn't understand it. O'Donnell had by this time completed the next adventure and Holdaway had illustrated the first 8 days' worth.

O'Donnell recalled in a 2002 interview: "This was a strip running in the tabloid Daily Mirror, for which I was writing "Garth". The editor was dissatisfied so he engaged Jim Holdaway to take over the drawing and asked me to write the scripts. That's how Jim and I first met, and we ran the strip for seven years, Romeo Brown was a comic private detective, and my brief was that every story was to revolve around a girl or girls, and the more clothes I could safely get off them the better."

O'Donnell followed Romeo Brown with the comic strip Modesty Blaise in the Evening Standard, which Holdaway illustrated from its debut on 13 May 1963 until his death in 1970.

== List of Romeo Brown stories ==
#	Title	Artist	Strip Numbers	Dates
01	Romeo Brown	Mazure	N208 - N231	01/09/54 - 28/09/54
02		Mazure	N232 - N250	29/09/54 - 20/10/54
03		Mazure	N251 - N271	21/10/54 - 13/11/54
04		Mazure	N272 - N291	15/11/54 - 07/12/54
05		Mazure	N292 - N310, O1 - O7	08/12/54 - 08/01/55
06	Looking After Bobby	Mazure	O8 - O37	10/01/55 - 12/02/55
07	The Missing Will	Mazure	O38 - O119	14/02/55 - 14/06/55
08	Caribbean Pirates	Mazure	O120 - O189	15/06/55 - 03/09/55
09	Tiger Girl	Mazure	O190 - O244	05/09/55 - 07/11/55
10	The Girl With The Heart Shaped Birthmark	Mazure	O245 - O289, P1 - P28	08/11/55 - 02/02/56
11	Find the Lady	Mazure	P29 - P81	03/02/56 - 05/04/56
12	Marriage Ltd	Mazure	P82 - P142	06/04/56 - 15/06/56
13	Beauty Queen	Mazure	P143 - P208	16/06/56 - 31/08/56
14	His Last Joke	Mazure	P209 - P268	01/09/56 - 09/11/56
15	Double Trouble	Mazure	P269 - P310, Q1 - Q18	10/11/56 - 21/01/57
16	Fingle's Follies	Holdaway	Q19 - Q81	22/01/57 - 04/04/57
17	The Missing Ming Vase	Holdaway	Q82 - Q140	05/04/57 - 13/06/57
18	Romeo the Ruthless	Holdaway	Q141 - Q204	14/06/57 - 27/08/57
19	The Girl and the Ghoul	Holdaway	Q205 - Q266	28/08/57 - 07/11/57
20	The Secret of Black Barbary	Holdaway	Q267 - Q310, R1 - R20	08/07/57 - 23/01/58
21	The Empress's Garters	Holdaway	R21 - R89	24/01/58 - 15/04/58
22	Romeo Goes West	Holdaway	R90 - R157	16/04/58 - 03/07/58
23	The Frolics of Fifi	Holdaway	R158 - R217	04/07/58 - 11/09/58
24	The Trouble With Tania	Holdaway	R218 - R287	12/09/58 - 02/12/58
25	The Snow Maiden	Holdaway	R288 - R310, S1 - S37	03/12/58 - 12/02/59
26	Lord of the Fiery Dragon	Holdaway	S38 - S111	13/02/59 - 11/05/59
27	The Fightin' Females	Holdaway	S112 - S180	12/05/59 - 30/07/59
28	The Gipsy's Curse	Holdaway	S181 - S263	31/07/59 - 04/11/59
29	The King of the Beatniks	Holdaway	S264 - S310, T1 - T22	05/11/59 - 26/01/60
30	Gigi and the Head-Shrinkers	Holdaway	T23 - T93	27/01/60 - 19/04/60
31	The Nobblers	Holdaway	T94 - T173	20/04/60 - 21/07/60
32	The Baffling Ballerina	Holdaway	T174 - T251	22/07/60 - 20/10/60
33	The Con-Man	Holdaway	T252 - T311, U1 - U14	21/10/60 - 17/01/61
34	Arabian Knight	Holdaway	U15 - U98	18/01/61 - 26/04/61
35	Where There's a Will	Holdaway	U99 - U175	27/04/61 - 25/07/61
36	The Admiral's Grand-Daughter	Holdaway	U176 - U246	26/07/61 - 16/10/61
37	The Missing Miss Peach	Holdaway	U247 - U308, V1 - V10	17/10/61 - 11/01/62
38	The Richest Girl In The World	Holdaway	V11 - V88	12/01/62 - 12/04/62
39	Romeo On The Run	Holdaway	V89 - V161	13/04/62 - 07/07/62
