= Alan Scott =

DC Comics superhero

- Alan Scott as depicted in Green Lantern Gallery #1 (December 1996). Art by Martin Nodell (penciler), Kevin Nowlan (inker), and Matt Hollingsworth (colorist).

Publication information
- Publisher: DC Comics
- First appearance: All-American Comics #16 (July 1940)
- Created by: Martin Nodell; Bill Finger

In-story information
- Full name: Alan Wellington Ladd-Scott
- Species: Metahuman
- Team affiliations: Justice Society of America; Green Lantern Corps; Checkmate; All-Star Squadron; Sentinels of Magic; Justice League
- Partnerships: Doiby Dickles; Jay Garrick; Jade; Obsidian
- Notable aliases: Green Lantern; Sentinel; Man of Green; White King; Keeper of the Starheart; Green Gladiator; Emerald Crusader; Emerald Gladiator; Green Guardsman; Jade Knight; Green Champion
- Abilities: Advanced hand-to-hand combatant and martial artist Indomitable Will; Fear Resistance; Expertise in acting, business and economics, engineering, electrical engineering, and investigative journalism Magical ring grants a variety of mystical powers such: Flight; Force Fields; Generation of Solid Light Constructs; Interstellar Travel; Superhuman Strength; Superhuman Durability; Superhuman Stamina; Superhuman Physical Resistance; Protection from Ballistic Weapons; Enhanced Reflexes; Enhanced Physical Combat Capability; Invisibility and Light Refraction; Intangibility and Wall-Phasing; Vacuum Survival; Space Survival; Starheart Synchronization; Mystical Energy Detection; Energy Detection; Life-Energy Detection; Magical-Energy Detection; Dimensional-Energy Detection; Telepathic Detection; Intuitive Power Manipulation; Frictionless Aura; Invulnerability; Magnetism; Molecular Reconstruction; Molecular Rearrangement; Mystical Flame Manipulation; Resistance to Magic; Psychic Resistance; Supernatural Resistance; Mystical Resistance; Magic Manipulation; Amplifying Magic; Eldritch Blasts; Emerald Sight; Energy Manipulation; EM Spectrum Control & Manipulation; Elemental Control & Manipulation; Gravity Control & Manipulation; Size and Mass Manipulation; Size Alternation; Density Control & Manipulation; Object Manipulation; Scale Manipulation; Electromagnetic Manipulation; Force Manipulation; Kinetic-Energy Manipulation; Kinetic Force Projection; Impact Amplification; Friction Manipulation; Lightning Generation; Radiation Manipulation; Heat Manipulation; Light Manipulation; Bioluminescence; Hypnosis; Optical Camouflage; Illusion Casting; Appearance Alteration; Visual Deception; Telepathy; Mind Control & Manipulation; Mind Reading; Psychic Communication; Mental Influence; Blinding; Restoration of Vision; Telekinesis; Teleportation; Reality Manipulation; Nature Manipulation; Matter Manipulation; Matter Transmutation; Space and Time Travel; Space-Time Manipulation; Temporal Displacement; Temporal Portal Creation; Historical/Temporal Phasing; Dimensional Travel; Dimensional Portal Creation; Interdimensional Movement; Chronokinesis; Chlorokinesis; Photokinesis; Atmokinesis; Wormholes and Spatial Manipulation; Light and Darkness Manipulation; Light Generation; Darkness Penetration; Dimensional Manipulation; Temporal Manipulation; Fourth-Dimensional Travel; Time-Portal Creation; Enhanced Senses; Cosmic Awareness; Accelerated/Decelerated Aging; Extended Lifespan; Eternal Youth; Immortality; Regeneration; Self-Healing; Healing Others; Resurrection; Metallokinesis; Electrokinesis; Manipulates Electricity to Various Effects, Including Shooting Lightning Bolts, Electromagnetism, and Deflecting Attacks

Alan Ladd Wellington Scott is a superhero appearing in American comic books published by DC Comics, and the first character to bear the name Green Lantern. He fights evil with the aid of his mystical ring, which grants him a variety of powers. He was created by Martin Nodell and Bill Finger, first appearing in the comic book All-American Comics #16, published on July 10, 1940.

Alan Scott was created after Nodell became inspired by the characters from Greek, Norse, and Middle Eastern myths and tales, including Aladdin from One Thousand and One Nights, and sought to create a popular entertainment character who fought evil with the aid of a magic ring that grants him various supernatural powers. After debuting in All-American Comics, Alan Scott soon became popular enough to sustain his own comic book, Green Lantern. Around this time, DC also began experimenting with fictional crossovers between its characters, leading towards a shared universe of characters. As one of the publisher's most popular heroes, Alan became a founding member of the Justice Society of America, one of the first such teams of "mystery men" or superheroes in comic books.

Following World War II, the character's popularity faded along with the decline of the Golden Age of Comic Books, leading to cancellation. After eight years out of print, DC reinvented Green Lantern as science fiction hero Hal Jordan in 1959. Later, DC revisited Alan Scott, establishing that he and Hal existed on Earth-Two and Earth-One respectively. Later stories set on Earth-Two depicted Alan becoming the father to the superheroes Obsidian and Jade, each with powers somewhat like his own, through Alan's first wife Rose Canton. Following the Crisis on Infinite Earths continuity reboot, Earth-Two is destroyed, and Alan is transported to the main universe.

In 2011, "The New 52" introduced a new Multiverse, depicting a young Earth-2 version of the character who was an out gay man. The "original" version of Alan is brought back into the mainstream continuity following the 2016 "DC Rebirth" initiative, and comes out in 2020 to his children as gay, retroactively establishing this incarnation as the first gay superhero.

== Publication history ==
The original Green Lantern was created by an American artist named Martin Nodell. Nodell mentions Richard Wagner's opera cycle The Ring of the Nibelung and the sight of a trainman's green railway lantern as his inspiration. After seeing this opera, Nodell sought to create a superhero who wielded a variety of magical powers from a magic ring, which he regularly recharged from a green lantern. Nodell wanted a colorful and interesting costume for his character, deriving from elements of Greek mythology. As Nodell recalled in an undated, latter-day interview,

When I sent it in, I waited into the second week before I heard the word to come in. I was ushered into Mr. [Max] Gaines' office, publisher, and after sitting a long time and flipping through the pages of my presentation, he announced, "We like it!" And then, "Get to work!" I did the first five pages of an eight-page story, and then they called in Bill Finger to help. We worked on it for seven years [through 1947].

All-American Comics #16 (July 1940) is the first appearance of Green Lantern. Art by Sheldon Moldoff.

Originally the character was to be named Alan Ladd which was a portmanteaux of Aladdin, but was changed to Alan Scott to avoid confusion with the real-life actor of the same name.

The character of Alan Scott made his debut in All-American Comics #16 (July 1940), fighting crime under the masked identity of "Green Lantern". He also appeared as part of the superhero team Justice Society of America in All Star Comics #3 (Winter 1940). He served as the team's second chairman in #7, but departed following that issue and returned a few years later, remaining a regular character. His villains tended to be ordinary humans, but he did have a few paranormal ones, such as the immortal Vandal Savage and the zombie Solomon Grundy. Green Lantern proved popular and was given his own series, Green Lantern, later that year. Most of his adventures were set in New York.

In 1941, Alan Scott was paired with a sidekick named Doiby Dickles, a rotund Brooklyn taxi driver, who would appear on a regular basis until 1949. In 1948, Alan also got a canine sidekick named Streak. The dog proved so popular that he starred in his own solo side-stories, even appearing on the cover without the title hero multiple times.

After World War II, superheroes declined in popularity. Green Lantern was cancelled in 1949 after 38 issues and All-American Comics dropped superheroes in favor of westerns. Alan Scott's final Golden Age appearance was in All-Star Comics #57 (1951). He remained out of publication for 12 years, and after his revival he did not get another solo series until 2023.

In 1959, DC Comics editor Julius Schwartz reinvented Green Lantern as a science fiction hero. The new Green Lantern, named Hal Jordan, was empowered by alien masters to serve as an interstellar lawman and had many adventures set in outer space. His powers were similar to Alan's but he was otherwise completely unrelated—Alan Scott never existed as far as the new stories were concerned. Hal Jordan proved popular, but readers still had an interest in the old Green Lantern. Some years later, Alan Scott reappeared as a guest star in The Flash #137 (1963). To avoid continuity conflicts with the Hal Jordan character, Alan Scott and all his old stories were retconned as having existed on Earth-Two, in a parallel universe. For most of the 1960s and 1970s, Alan Scott made guest appearances in books belonging to Silver Age characters, visiting their universe through magical or technological means. In 1976, he appeared regularly alongside his Justice Society comrades in the revived All-Star Comics and later Adventure Comics in stories set in the 1970s. In 1981, DC Comics launched All-Star Squadron, which featured Alan Scott and the Justice Society in a World War II setting.

In 1986, the editors at DC Comics decided that all its characters should exist within the same setting and effected this change with the Crisis on Infinite Earths miniseries. Alan Scott now shared the same fictional world as Hal Jordan. DC Comics decided to write the character out of continuity in a one-shot book entitled Last Days of the Justice Society, in which he was "forever" trapped in an extra-dimensional realm. The character was brought back in the 1990s due to fan interest. Rather than update Alan Scott as a contemporary young hero as had been done with Batman and Superman, Alan Scott was instead written as a veteran of World War II with a magically prolonged lifespan. To distinguish Alan Scott from Hal Jordan, his superhero codename was for a time changed to "Sentinel" and he lost his magic ring, manifesting his powers through his glowing hands instead. In JSA #50 (2003) he regained his classic codename and ring, though he remained apart from Hal Jordan's Green Lantern Corps. He was a regular character in JSA and Justice Society of America.

In 2011, DC Comics again rebooted their fictional properties, erasing Alan from Earth Prime and instead having a new version of Alan Scott that once again exists on Earth-2, where Hal Jordan and his Green Lantern Corps do not exist. This new Alan Scott is no longer a grizzled veteran of World War II, but a fresh young superhero. He first appears in Earth 2 #3 (2012) with a completely redesigned sleek, solid green suit with no cape.

In the 2017–2019 Doomsday Clock event, Prime Earth Alan is unerased by Doctor Manhattan, and is merged back into Earth Prime during the 2020–2021 Dark Nights: Death Metal multiversal reboot event.

The copyright for the comic was renewed in 1967.

== Fictional character biography ==
=== Golden and Silver Ages ===
==== Discovery ====
A young Alan Scott becomes Green Lantern. Art by Martin Nodell.

Thousands of years ago, a mystical "green flame" fell to Earth in ancient China as a meteor. A voice in the flame predicted that it would act three times: once to bring death, once to bring life, and once to bring power. For the first prophecy, a lamp-maker crafted the green metal of the meteor into a lamp. In fear and as punishment for what they thought sacrilege, the local villagers killed him, only to be destroyed by a sudden burst of the green flame. For the second, in modern times, the lamp came into the hands of a patient of a mental institution who fashioned the lamp into a modern train lantern. The green flame restored his sanity and gave him a new life. For the third, by 1940, after having already fulfilled the first two-thirds of this prophecy, the lantern fashioned from the meteoric metal fell into the hands of Alan Scott, a young railroad engineer. Following a railroad bridge collapse, the flame instructs Scott in how to fashion a ring from its metal, to give him fantastic powers as the superhero Green Lantern. He adopts a colorful costume of red, purple, brown, yellow, and green. He becomes a crimefighter in his first adventure, defeating the crooks who caused the accident. He also discovers his powers' weakness to wood when he is bludgeoned with a club. Alan is a founding member of the Justice Society of America, and is its second chairman.

Alan Scott, the original Green Lantern, during the 1940s. Art by Nodell and Jerry Ordway.

Scott uses his ring to fly, walk through solid objects by "moving through the fourth dimension", paralyze or blind people temporarily, hypnotize them, create rays of energy, melt metal as with a blowtorch, and cause dangerous objects to glow, among other things. It could also allow him and others to time travel. Occasionally, he uses it to read minds or create solid objects and force fields in the manner usually associated with fellow Green Lantern, Hal Jordan. His ring could protect him against any object made of metal, but would not protect him against any wood- or plant-based objects.

During the 1940s, Green Lantern seemed to alternate between serious adventure, particularly when Solomon Grundy, his nemesis, appeared and light comedy, usually involving his sidekick, Doiby Dickles. Toward the end of his Golden Age adventures, he got a sidekick and companion pet in Streak the Wonder Dog – a heroic canine in the mold of Rin-Tin-Tin and Lassie – who was later retconned as a member of the Space Canine Patrol Agents, and the Legion of Super-Pets.

In All-American Comics #38, it's revealed his middle name is Wellington.

==== Justice Society of America ====
A part of Scott's early history is filled out with retroactive continuity. All-Star Squadron Annual #3 states that the JSA fought the villain Ian Karkull, who inadvertently imbued them with life energy stolen from an innocent victim. The energy slowed their aging, allowing Scott and several other members, as well as their spouses, to remain active into the late 20th century without infirmity. The events of that incident also led Scott, who had failed to save the victim from whom the energy was stolen, to take a leave of absence from the JSA, explaining why the character vanished from the roster for a time.

Scott was a member of the Justice Society of America in 1951 when the team was investigated by the "Joint Congressional Un-American Activities Committee," a fictional organization based on the real-life House Un-American Activities Committee. They were accused of possible communist sympathies and asked to reveal their identities. The members declined the request, and many of the members retired in the 1950s.

The team rebands in the 1960s with Scott as a member, though little is known of their adventures during this time, save for stories about their team-ups with the Justice League of America, the parallel world Earth-One, and cross-universe adventures Scott shares with Earth-One's Green Lantern, Hal Jordan.

==== Progeny ====
It was eventually revealed that in the late 1960s that Scott marries the woman with the dual identity Rose and Thorn. They have a pair of children who would grow up to become the superheroes Jade and Obsidian of the team Infinity, Inc.

In the 1980s, Scott married his reformed former nemesis, Molly Mayne, also known as The Harlequin, reconciling with his son and daughter.

=== Post-Crisis on Infinite Earths ===
The Last Days of the Justice Society of America Special (1986) one-shot tells how Adolf Hitler caused a massive wave of destructive energy to erupt over the post-Crisis Earth in 1945. Scott and the JSA, fresh from burying their Earth-Two comrades Robin and Huntress, enter into a limbo dimension to fight an eternally recurring Ragnarok.

Green Lantern (vol. 3) #19 attempted to retcon Alan Scott's origin and power ring to accommodate the changes made by Crisis on Infinite Earths. In this story, Alan's ring originally belonged to a Green Lantern named Yalan Gur, who was so favored by the Guardians of the Universe that they removed the yellow impurity from his ring (which the Guardians deliberately placed in all the GL rings to limit their power and could be removed at their discretion). However, Yalan Gur abused his power and interfered with the inhabitants of ancient China. The Guardians then substituted a weakness for wood that allowed the local peasants to successfully attack and mortally wound Yalan with simple wooden clubs. Yalan flew into the sky and raged against the Guardians. His body burned in the atmosphere, becoming the green metallic meteorite that ultimately became Alan Scott's lantern. Yalan's spirit also possessed the metal, promising death in his rage and life when he realized his mistakes (the first two prophecies of the green metal, which were fulfilled). When Alan received the lantern, the spirit directed Alan to create the power ring and persona of Green Lantern, complete with the ring's weakness to wood.

==== Return ====
Through the machinations of Waverider, the JSA teammates are able to leave Limbo and begin living in the Post-Crisis Earth they had fought to save. The miniseries is followed by Justice Society of America (1992–1993), which shows how Alan Scott adjusts to his new world. In the short-lived series, the JSA fight the newest incarnation of the Ultra-Humanite as well as Pol St. Germain and Kulak the Sorcerer. Scott reconnects with his wife and children, stating in issue #1 that Molly "is pretty much handling things at the company..." and that Jade and Obsidian "... are fine off doing their own thing in Hollywood. Not too interested in being super-heroes." The series ends with issue #10, not with the team disbanding, but with the members gathering together at their first formal meeting after returning home.

Alan follows Guy Gardner and a small group of heroes to investigate a mysterious distress from Oa, only to be defeated by Hal Jordan, who now calls himself Parallax, having been driven mad after the destruction of his home, Coast City. After the confrontation, Alan discovers that an artist, Kyle Rayner, inherits the remaining Green Lantern ring. After meeting the young hero, he informs him of the situations with Jordan and the Green Lantern Corps. During the Zero Hour: Crisis in Time! event, Alan witnesses the villain Extant incapacitate and kill several of his JSA teammates. After suffering defeat by the villain, Alan gives Kyle his original ring, passing the name "Green Lantern" to him. Alan's ring was later destroyed by Parallax.

For a time, the Starheart became part of Scott's body and he adopts the name Sentinel, becoming a founding member of a new JSA. Thanks to the rejuvenative properties of the Starheart, Scott's physical body is again temporarily revitalized so that he resembles a man in his 30s or early 40s. This drives his wife Molly, who has not been affected, to sell her soul to the demon Neron in exchange for youth. Alan enters the demonic realm, with help from entities such as the Phantom Stranger and Zatanna, and, with Kyle Rayner's aid, manages to win Molly's soul back, reuniting Molly's essence with her soulless being.

He has since been physically altered again so that he more closely resembles his true chronological age. He returns to using the name "Green Lantern" during the JSA's battle with Mordru. He continues to fight crime in his original costumed identity, rebuilding a ring and serving as an elder statesman to the Justice Society of America and to the superhero community in general.

In Green Lantern: Rebirth, Alan and his daughter Jade, assist the surviving members of the Green Lantern Corps, Hal Jordan, who had been possessed by the ancient fear entity Parallax, John Stewart, Guy Gardner, Kyle Rayner, and Kilowog, in defeating the Parallax-possessed Ganthet. Alan is increasingly physically weakened due to Parallax's failed attempts to mind control him as it did with Jordan, Stewart, Gardner, and Kilowog, so it decides to kill him instead. However, Jordan, with the aid of The Spectre, breaks free from Parallax's influence, and saves Alan from the fear entity.

During the Rann-Thanagar War, Kyle Rayner's power ring revealed that Scott is an honorary member of the Green Lantern Corps.

==== Infinite Crisis and 52 ====
During the Infinite Crisis, Scott and his daughter Jade, along with many others, travel with Donna Troy to the center of the universe to save it from Alexander Luthor Jr. Though they manage to succeed in saving the universe, Jade dies on this mission. A year later, Scott is still active and relatively youthful compared to his true age, but now wears an eyepatch having lost his eye in a Zeta beam transporter accident while returning from space. Though Scott loses his daughter, he tells Kyle Rayner that he still has family both through relations and close friendships, among which he counts Kyle.

Week 4 of the 52 maxiseries reveals that Scott lost his left eye during a period when he and several other superheroes were declared missing approximately 11 months prior to the events of Checkmate #1. The Zeta Beam that Adam Strange had hoped to use for teleporting the heroes away from the time-space ripple caused by Alexander Luthor, Jr.'s actions was splintered by the ripple itself, mutilating the heroes in various ways.

In Week 5, Alan goes to the wife and daughter of Animal Man to tell them that Animal Man is missing in space. This gives Ellen Baker more hope that her husband is alive.

In Week 29, Alan, Wildcat, and Jay Garrick (Flash) are the only members of the JSA present on Thanksgiving. They talk about the other members of the JSA and about the new Infinity Inc., which is a new version of a team of which Alan's daughter, Jade, was a member.

After being put into a comatose state during an attack by the Gentleman Ghost, Alan envisions Jade, who tells him goodbye and grants him another portion of her green energy. His missing eye is replaced by a green glowing orb that, due to its mystical origins and connection to Jade, allows him to track astral and mystical energy forms such as ghosts.

==== "One Year Later" ====
During the missing year of the "One Year Later" storyline, Scott has joined Checkmate at the rank of White King, with his JSA teammate Mister Terrific as his Bishop. Scott soon finds himself in a moral conflict with Black Queen Sasha Bordeaux over the violent nature of Checkmate, particularly after Bordeaux and her team slaughter dozens of Kobra operatives during a raid on a facility. Bordeaux contends that the ends justify the means, while Scott adheres to the principle that heroes should not kill unless absolutely necessary. Bordeaux responds by suggesting that Scott resign. Concurrent with this internal conflict, Scott and the White Queen (Amanda Waller) try to keep the organization from being discontinued by political forces.

After the rise of the being Gog, Alan Scott allies with the Justice Society members that oppose Gog's simplistic view of the world. However, after encountering a Justice Society from an alternate universe in which his daughter Jade is still alive, he considers asking the seemingly all powerful being to raise his daughter from the dead. Later, Sandman learns that Gog is rooting himself into the Earth, and if he remains for one more day, the Earth will no longer be able to survive without him. The rest of the JSA arrive to kill Gog by separating his head from the Earth, which is the only way to save the planet. The Society members ally with Gog in an attempt to protect him until they see him attempt to attack a Society member. All of Gog's followers, including Magog, turn on him, causing Gog's blessing on them to be undone. The JSA are able to topple Gog and send him to the Source Wall, but Alan is unable to see his daughter.

In Final Crisis, Alan led a resistance against Darkseid's forces as one of the superheroes responding to Article X. He is shown defending Checkmate's Switzerland HQ from the Justifiers. Though Donna Troy tries to place the Justifier helmet on him, Hawkman saves him.

In Blackest Night, Alan and the rest of the JSA battle the reanimated Kal-L and Black Lantern versions of dead Justice Society members. After Jakeem Thunder is knocked out, Alan is one of the heroes who adds his powers into a "Black Lantern Bomb" designed to mimic Jakeem's Thunderbolt abilities, destroying all of the Black Lanterns in New York. In the final battle of the event, his daughter Jade is resurrected by the power of white light.

==== "Brightest Day" ====
In the beginning of the "Brightest Day" storyline, Alan lies in the arms of Obsidian, convulsing and writhing as a green light pours from his body. His body possessed, Alan flies off with his JSA teammates in hot pursuit, eventually led the team to Germany. The JSA meet with Batman's new Justice League and find that Jade, who had been staying on Oa since her resurrection, has returned to Earth in a green meteor, later revealed to be the legendary Starheart that gave Alan his powers. Sebastian Faust tells the two teams that the Starheart has been gradually taking control of people on Earth for some time. Now that it is on Earth, it is growing more powerful and driving metahumans all over the world insane. Jade states that the Starheart captured her in space and purposely brought her to Earth to find Alan and that it is her fault that her father is now in danger. Just then, Alan awakens and his costume transforms into a suit of armor identical to the one he wears in Kingdom Come, and he then tells the assembled heroes that he intends on destroying the world.

Starman is sent into space to search for Alan, and finds that Alan has constructed a massive fortress on the surface of the Moon. Before Starman can warn the others, Alan appears in front of him and tears his gem, the source of his abilities, from his chest, thus rendering him powerless. The Starheart uses its influence to corrupt various metahumans with magical or elemental abilities, which creates chaos across the globe. Realizing that the heroes must defeat Alan to end the chaos, Batman recruits Miss Martian to get a mental lock on Starman, which, in turn, provides the Justice League with Alan's location. Batman then assembles a small strikeforce consisting of himself, Jade, Hourman, Donna Troy, Jesse Quick, and Mr. America, all of whom have a low chance of being possessed by the Starheart. Mister Miracle arrives and informs the team that Alan has most likely installed Fourth World defenses in his base and offers to use his knowledge of such technology to guide them through the fortress. When they finally find him, Jade uses her powers to restore Alan to normal. With his sanity restored, Alan chooses to allow the Emerald City he created on the moon to stay and the city becomes populated by various magical creatures from throughout the DCU.

After the events of the "Brightest Day", Alan and the rest of the JSA travel to the city of Monument Point, which has been attacked by a superpowered terrorist named Scythe. Just before being defeated, Scythe snaps Alan's neck. In the subsequent story, it is revealed that Scythe is the product of Nazi genetic engineering, and that Alan and Jay had been tasked by the president with killing the experiment back when he was in infancy during World War 2. The two heroes could not agree on a course of action, and, as a result, Scythe was allowed to live. Doctor Mid-Nite discovers that the injuries Alan sustained have rendered him paralyzed, and that any attempt to heal himself could break his constant concentration, which could result in the Starheart once again regaining control of his body.

Jade visits her bed-ridden father in the Emerald City, and offers to use her abilities to help him walk again. Alan declines his daughter's offer, reasoning that if the Starheart were to once again take over his body, it could result in the deaths of everyone in the city. Eclipso attacks the city, which results in Jesse Quick having to get Alan to safety. After taking over Jade, Eclipso has the power of the starheart then defeats and possesses the Justice League's reserve roster, and then badly injures the angel Zauriel. With the Justice League outnumbered, Eclipso then reveals his ultimate goal is to somehow kill God. Eclipso then tortures Zauriel, causing his screams to attract the attention of the new Spectre, Crispus Allen, who he kills, absorbing the Spectre's powers upon his demise. With his newfound abilities, Eclipso reveals that God relies on the collective love of humanity to stay alive, and that by destroying the Earth, Eclipso will ultimately kill God once and for all. Just as the members of the JLA prepare to wage a counterattack, Eclipso destroys the Moon, apparently dooming all life on Earth. With the Moon destroyed, Eclipso then seemingly kills Donna Troy, the physically strongest remaining member of the Justice League. However, it is ultimately revealed that Donna's death was an illusion conjured by Saint Walker, who used his blue power ring to temporarily trap Eclipso in a state of euphoria. After the Atom and Starman break Eclipso's link to his brainwashed slaves, the combined heroes attack Eclipso together, defeating him. In the aftermath it is discovered that Jade and Obsidian can now be within proximity of each other again and their father has control of the Starheart again.

Later, the JSA try to take down the villain D'arken who has broken free from imprisonment beneath Monument Point and absorbed the powers of JSA members, but D'arken is too powerful. Due to this only non-superpowered and magical members fight D'arken. The JSA tells Alan that unleashing the Starheart is the only way to destroy D'arken. However, after releasing the Starheart energies, Alan's body begins to incinerate. Afterwards, the JSA attend a funeral for Alan, whom they believe to be dead.

=== DC Universe and The New Golden Age ===
In Doomsday Clock, Johnny Thunder finds Alan Scott's Green Lantern power battery in a steel mill. After he and Saturn Girl save Thunder from some junkies, Rorschach (Reggie Long) asks Thunder what the lantern is. Later, it is revealed that Doctor Manhattan prevented Scott from becoming Green Lantern, preventing the Justice Society from forming. However, Manhattan eventually restores the timeline and Scott's existence.

In Dark Nights: Death Metal, Alan Scott helps battle Perpetua and the Darkest Knight. Following this, he reunites with Jade and Obsidian and comes out as gay. He is invited to join the Totality, a team of superheroes and villains dedicated to protecting Earth.

In "The New Golden Age", Scott is revealed to have a Russian counterpart in Red Lantern, who he fought on occasion and had a truce with when Nazis threatened both North America and Russia.

In Alan Scott: The Green Lantern, Alan's early history is again rebooted, filled out with new retroactive continuity. In 1936, Alan was in a secret romantic relationship with fellow engineer Johnny Ladd, with both working on a secret government project related to the Crimson Flame. However, Johnny is seemingly killed when the Crimson Flame attacks their ship and snatches Johnny. Once Alan's superiors realize he was in a relationship with Johnny, they force him to check into Arkham Asylum to undergo conversion therapy. However, he eventually escapes, becomes an engineer again, and hooks up with a string of lovers including Robbie and Jimmy. When Alan and Jimmy land a lucrative engineering project, Alan's rival Albert Dekker attempts to kill him, causing a train crash that kills Jimmy and activates Alan's Green Lantern powers. By 1941, Alan has been predominately working solo as a Green Lantern, with the support of his best friend Doiby Dickles. However, J. Edgar Hoover blackmails him into being an more active member of the JSA, or else he will publicly expose his sexuality. While Alan reluctantly works with the JSA, he gets involved in a case where he realizes he is being framed for murder, with the targets being his former lovers and friends.

== Powers, abilities, and equipment ==
Alan Scott originally wields an ancient ring that can produce a variety of effects. The extent of his ring's ability has never been rigorously defined, but its effects are accompanied by a green light and cannot directly affect wooden materials.

In Scott's first appearance, his body would glow green whenever he utilized this power, including passing through walls or flying. During his later appearances, he projects a greenish laser beam from his ring capable of doing many things, such as lifting objects, manipulating metals, hypnotizing people, traveling through spacetime, or rewriting reality itself. This ring makes him invulnerable to non-wooden weapons. He conjures up solid-light objects in any size or shape, referred to as "constructs". These constructs are always pure green in color and vanish as soon as he stops concentrating on them. Scott controls the objects telekinetically.

At the start of numerous stories, he charges his ring by touching it to a Starheart Lantern, which will give him full energy for 24 hours (until how heavily it runs out).

In the Starheart storyline, his constructs were now wreathed in green flames, thus highlighting their magical (but not technological) nature. He physically merged with his lantern and no longer needs to recharge like Hal Jordan does.

After battling Ian Karkull, a unique form of radiation from the Shadowlands he was bathed in granted him eternal youth.

Before he became a superhero, Scott possesses expertise in acting, business and economics, engineering, electrical engineering, investigative journalism and martial combat.

== Other versions ==
=== Earth 2 ===
Alan Scott's redesigned costume from Earth 2 #3 (September 2012). Art by Trevor Scott and Nicola Scott.

Alan Scott was reintroduced in issue 1 of Earth 2 as the head of GBC productions on Earth 2 (a parallel world within the DC Multiverse). This version of Green Lantern is associated with the Green, a mystical force connecting all botanical life on Earth. On June 1, 2012, DC announced that Scott would be depicted as gay. In issue 3, Scott is revealed to have a boyfriend named Sam Zhao, to whom he intends to propose while on vacation in China. Before Scott can do so, the train on which he and Sam are traveling is suddenly wrecked. A mysterious green flame protects Scott and heals him; a disembodied voice informs him that the crash was caused by a force that threatens the whole world, and that Sam did not survive. The grief-stricken Scott is then told that he will be given the power to avenge his love and protect the world. The flame creates a costume for him, and molds Sam's engagement ring into a power ring with which Scott can harness his power. Reborn as the Green Lantern, Scott proceeds to help the other survivors and swears vengeance for Sam. In the present, he gains an enemy in Solomon Grundy who is an avatar of the Grey. The battle continues until Scott exiles Grundy to the moon where neither he nor the "Grey" can do any damage.

Following a fight with Solomon Grundy, the Parliaments end their feud and instruct Scott, Sam Zhao, Grundy, the Clear's avatar Azathoth, and the Red's avatar Yolanda Montez to combat an invasion from Apokolips. When Apokolips starts to approach Earth 2, the Parliaments advise their representatives to join forces and fight this threat. While in Earth's orbit, Solomon Grundy, Azathoth, and Sam Zhao sacrifice themselves to give Scott their power and allow him to stop Apokolips. Following a disastrous fight with Darkseid, Alan encounters Sam's spirit, who reveals that he has become the avatar of the White. He has been assisting the Parliaments to ease Scott's transition into realizing his full potential as the last champion of Earth and to embody its primordial essences at the cost of losing his memories of Sam.

=== Kingdom Come ===
Green Lantern (Alan Scott) as depicted in Kingdom Come. Art by Alex Ross.

In the Kingdom Come limited series by Mark Waid and Alex Ross, Alan Scott is the only Green Lantern on Earth. He lives in an orbital space station called New Oa from which he protects Earth from alien attacks, and has ceased to meddle in human affairs. When Superman comes out of retirement, he joins the Justice League to help suppress the rogue superhumans that are causing chaos throughout the world. After the crisis is resolved, Scott joins the United Nations as the ambassador of New Oa. Scott's costume in this series was styled after the full plate armor of medieval knights. In the regular books, he has sported this armor on several occasions when he uses high amounts of power.

== In other media ==
=== Television ===
- Scott Mason / Green Guardsman, a character based on Alan Scott appears in the Justice League two-part episode "Legends", voiced by William Katt. He is a member of the Justice Guild of America, a superhero team from another universe who exist as comic characters in the "prime" universe, and died in a nuclear war. He also wields a power ring similar to those used by the Green Lantern Corps, though he cannot affect aluminium.
- Alan Scott appears in the Smallville two-part episode "Absolute Justice", portrayed by Doug Pinton. This version operated as a superhero, member of the Justice Society of America (JSA), and served as the CEO of an unnamed broadcasting company in the 1970s before he was arrested for fraud by the government, who intended to eliminate the JSA. Scott and the other members tried to take the blame for several crimes, though they were never convicted. As the law was now aware of his superhero identity, Scott retired from heroics. His ring and battery were later stored in the museum that the JSA used as their headquarters.
- Alan Scott appears in the Batman: The Brave and the Bold episode "Crisis: 22,300 Miles Above Earth!", voiced by Corey Burton. This version is an aged member of the Justice Society of America.
- Alan Scott makes a non-speaking appearance in the Young Justice episode "Humanity" as a member of the Justice Society of America.
- Alan Scott appears in the Stargirl pilot episode, portrayed by an uncredited actor. This version was a member of the Justice Society of America before being killed by the Injustice Society a decade prior. While his ring disappeared, Courtney Whitmore recovers his powerless battery in the present in the hopes of finding someone to succeed him during the first season. Scott's children, Jennie-Lynn Hayden and Todd Rice (portrayed by Ysa Penarejo and Tim Gabriel respectively), and ring appear in the second and third seasons.

=== Film ===
Alan Scott makes a cameo appearance in the opening credits of Justice League: The New Frontier, wherein he is forced out of heroics by the government.

=== Video games ===
- Alan Scott appears in DC Universe Online, voiced by Jason Phelps.
- Alan Scott appears as a character summon in Scribblenauts Unmasked: A DC Comics Adventure.

=== Miscellaneous ===
- Alan Scott appears in the Sleepers trilogy, created by Mike Baron and written by Christopher Priest.
- Alan Scott appears in Adventures in the DC Universe #4.
- Alan Scott makes a cameo appearance in Justice League Adventures #20.
- Alan Scott appears in Justice League Unlimited #40.

=== Merchandise ===
- In 2010, a figure of Alan Scott was released in Wave 14 of Mattel's DC Universe Classics toyline.
- In 2023, McFarlane Toys created a figure of Alan Scott for their DC Multiverse line inspired by his appearance in Day of Vengeance.

== Collected editions ==
- Golden Age Green Lantern Archives Vol. 1 (Green Lantern Vol. 1 #1 and All-American Comics #16–30)
- Golden Age Green Lantern Archives Vol. 2 (Green Lantern Vol. 1 #2–3 and All-American Comics #31–38)
- JSA Presents: Green Lantern (Green Lantern: Brightest Day, Blackest Night (one-shot); JSA: Classified #25, #32–33)
- Crisis on Multiple Earths: The Team-Ups Vol. 1 (Green Lantern Vol. 2 #40)
- Crisis on Multiple Earths: The Team-Ups Vol. 2 (Green Lantern Vol. 2 #45, 52)
