= Martin Nodell =

American cartoonist and comics creator (1915–2006)

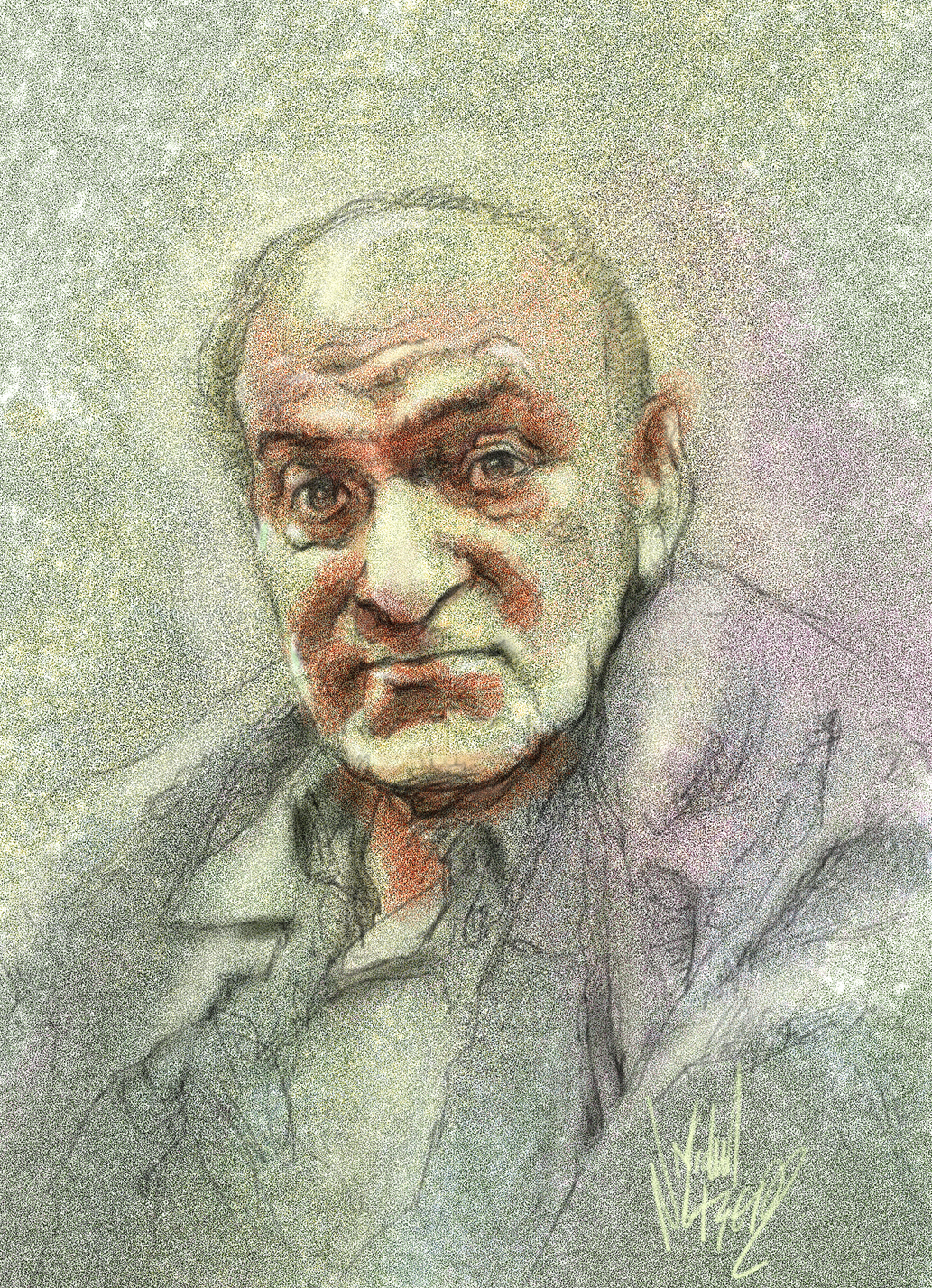
- Martin Nodell by Michael Netzer
- Born: November 15, 1915 Philadelphia, Pennsylvania, U.S.
- Died: December 9, 2006 (aged 91) Muskego, Wisconsin, U.S.
- Areas: Penciller, Inker
- Pseudonym: Mart Dellon
- Notable works: Golden Age Green Lantern (Alan Scott)

Martin Nodell (/noʊˈdɛl/; November 15, 1915 – December 9, 2006) was an American cartoonist and commercial artist, best known as the creator of the Golden Age superhero Green Lantern. Some of his work appeared under the pen name Mart Dellon.

== Biography ==
=== Early life ===
Born in Philadelphia, Pennsylvania, Nodell was the son of Jewish immigrants. He attended the Art Institute of Chicago. When he was 18 years old, he moved to New York City, where he attended Pratt Institute. Nodell worked as an actor in both Chicago and New York, and began his drawing career by selling caricatures for theatrical publicity work before turning full time to comic book art.

=== National Comics Publications ===
Nodell began his illustrating career in 1938, working first as a freelancer. In 1940, he provided some work for Sheldon Mayer, an editor at All-American Publications, one of three companies that ultimately merged to form National Comics Publications (present-day DC Comics). Interested in gaining more steady employment, Nodell created designs for a new character that would become the Golden Age Green Lantern (Alan Scott). The inspiration came in January 1940 at the 34th Street subway station in Manhattan. Nodell noticed a trainman waving a lantern along the darkened tracks. He coupled the imagery with elements from Richard Wagner's operatic Ring cycle as well as Chinese folklore and Greek mythology to create the hero.

As Nodell himself described in 2000:

I picked out the name from the train man on the tracks who was waving a lantern, going from red to green. ... Green meant go and I decided that was it. Then I needed a colorful and interesting costume. I was interested in Greek mythology and so the costume took on elements of that. It just all fell into place. When I sent it in, I waited into the second week before I heard the word to come in. I was ushered into Mr. [Max] Gaines office, publisher, and after sitting a long time and flipping through the pages of my presentation, he announced, 'We like it!' And then, 'Get to work!' I did the first five pages of an eight page story, and then they called in Bill Finger to help. We worked on it for seven years.

The first adventure, drawn by Nodell (as Mart Dellon) and written by Bill Finger, appeared in All-American Comics #16 (July 1940). Nodell continued to use the pseudonym through at least All Star Comics #2 (Fall 1940). He said in 2000 he had used the pen name since, "Comics were a forbidden literature, culturally unacceptable. It wasn't something you were proud of." Nodell penciled and virtually always self-inked Green Lantern stories in All-American and All Star until the character got his own title, the premiere issue cover-dated July 1941. He would continue with it through to #25 (May 1947), very rarely drawing the covers, before being succeeded by a variety of artists including Howard Purcell, Irwin Hasen, and Alex Toth.

=== Timely Comics ===
Marvel Tales #93 (Aug. 1949). Cover art by Nodell.

Nodell left All-American in 1947 and joined Timely Comics, the 1930s–40s forerunner of Marvel Comics, where he drew postwar stories of Captain America, the Human Torch, and the Sub-Mariner. His work there was rarely signed, making identification difficult, though comics historians have confirmed that Nodell drew two well-known covers: the first issue of Marvel Tales, Timely's horror-comics revamp of the company's flagship series Marvel Mystery Comics; and the penultimate issue (#74) of Captain America's book, which for its last two issues became the horror-oriented Captain America's Weird Tales.

=== Post-1950s career ===
In 1950, Nodell left comics to work in advertising and later joined the Leo Burnett Agency in Chicago as an art director. In 1965, Nodell's design team developed the long-running flour-company mascot the Pillsbury Doughboy.

His only known comics work in the interim are penciling the story "The Glistening Death" in the Avon Comics one-shot City of the Living Dead (1952), reprinted two decades later in the Skywald horror-comics magazine Psycho #1 (Jan. 1971); and "Master of the Dead" in Avon's Eerie (1951 series) #14, reprinted in Skywald's Nightmare #1 (Dec. 1970).

Captain America's Weird Tales #74 (Oct. 1949). Cover art by Nodell.

In the 1980s, Nodell submitted new work to DC, which led to his being rediscovered by comic fans. His first pieces included drawing the Golden Age Harlequin in Who's Who: The Definitive Directory of the DC Universe #10 (Dec. 1985). His final two published pieces of Green Lantern art were a story starring Alan Scott and the Green Lantern Corps in the 50th-anniversary issue Green Lantern vol. 3, #19 (Dec. 1991) and a one-page illustration of Scott and Superman in the one-shot Superman: The Man of Steel Gallery #1 (Dec. 1995). At 80, Nodell penciled his final comic-book work, the whimsical, 10-page Harlan Ellison adaptation "Gnomebody", scripted by John Ostrander and Ellison and inked by Jedediah Hotchkiss, in Dark Horse Comics' Harlan Ellison's Dream Corridor Quarterly #1 (Aug. 1996).

=== Personal life ===
Nodell met his future wife, Carrie, at Coney Island in Brooklyn, New York, in September 1940. They were married December 1, 1941, and afterward moved to Huntington, Long Island, to move in with Nodell's brother Simon, an engineer at Republic Aviation. They lived there for two years before moving back to Brooklyn, New York City. The couple was living in West Palm Beach, Florida, by 2000. Nodell died on December 9, 2006, in a nursing home in Muskego, Wisconsin, of natural causes at the age of 91. They had two sons: Spencer, who lived in Waukesha, Wisconsin at the time of his father's death, and Mitchell.

== Awards ==
Nodell received the Inkpot Award in 1986. In 2011, Nodell was nominated as a Judges' Choice for The Will Eisner Award Hall of Fame.
