= Ralph Dunagin =

American cartoonist (1937–2020)

- Born: June 19, 1937; Hattiesburg, Mississippi
- Died: June 24, 2020 (aged 83)
- Occupation: Cartoonist

Raymond Ralph Dunagin Jr. (June 19, 1937 – June 24, 2020) was an American cartoonist for the Orlando Evening Star and the Orlando Sentinel from 1961 to 2001. He was a finalist for the Pulitzer Prize twice.

== Early life and education ==
Dunagin was born in Hattiesburg, Mississippi. He graduated from Petal High School in 1955 and then attended Pearl River Community College. He served in the United States Marine Corps. After serving in the Marine Corps, he attended the University of Southern Mississippi.

== Career ==
He spent about 40 years as the art director and editorial cartoonist for the Orlando Sentinel as well as an editorial board member. He also created the comic strips Dunagin's People and Grin and Bear It. He and Dana Summers, another Sentinel cartoonist who worked with him for 30 years, worked together on the comic strip The Middletons. Dunagin was called a "southern gentleman" and his obituary called his work "witty, relatable drawings." He had Parkinson's disease and vascular dementia when he died at 83 in 2020 in Houma, Louisiana.
