= Ralph Kent (artist) =

American artist and imagineer (born 1939)

- Born: Ralph Kwiatkowski; January 28, 1939; Buffalo, New York, U.S.
- Died: September 10, 2007 (aged 68); Kissimmee, Florida
- Notable work: Mickey Mouse; It's a Small World; Celebrity Sports Center; EPCOT Center; Tokyo Disneyland
- Title: Director of Walt Disney Imagineering East, Imagineer, Art director
- Awards: Disney Legend, 2004

Ralph Kent (January 28, 1939 – September 10, 2007) was an American artist and Imagineer. His most famous work was designing the first limited-edition Walt Disney's Mickey Mouse watch for adults.

== Biography ==
=== 1960s ===
By 1965, Kent had become a trusted artist of Walt Disney and was responsible for designing the first limited-edition Mickey Mouse watch for adults. Walt gifted 25 of these watches to his top executives and the Mickey Mouse adult watch designs became a constant in Disney merchandising with over 100 designs manufactured each year since.

=== 1970s and beyond ===
The 1990s saw another transition for Kent as he joined the Disney Design Group as a corporate trainer. Known as "The Keeper of the Mouse," Kent trained other Disney artists to draw the Mickey Mouse design uniformly, and also helped determine which merchandise would carry the Mickey image. Besides being a mentor for new aspiring artists, Kent taught park guests at the Disney Institute and created a thorough collection of Disney character reference model sheets.

== Awards and honors ==
In a 2004 ceremony at the Disney Studios in Burbank, CA, Kent was inducted as a Disney Legend. Kent also was honored with a window bearing his name on Main Street, U.S.A. of the Magic Kingdom park at Walt Disney World.

== See also ==
- Celebrity Sports Center
