= Flapper Fanny Says =

American comic strip

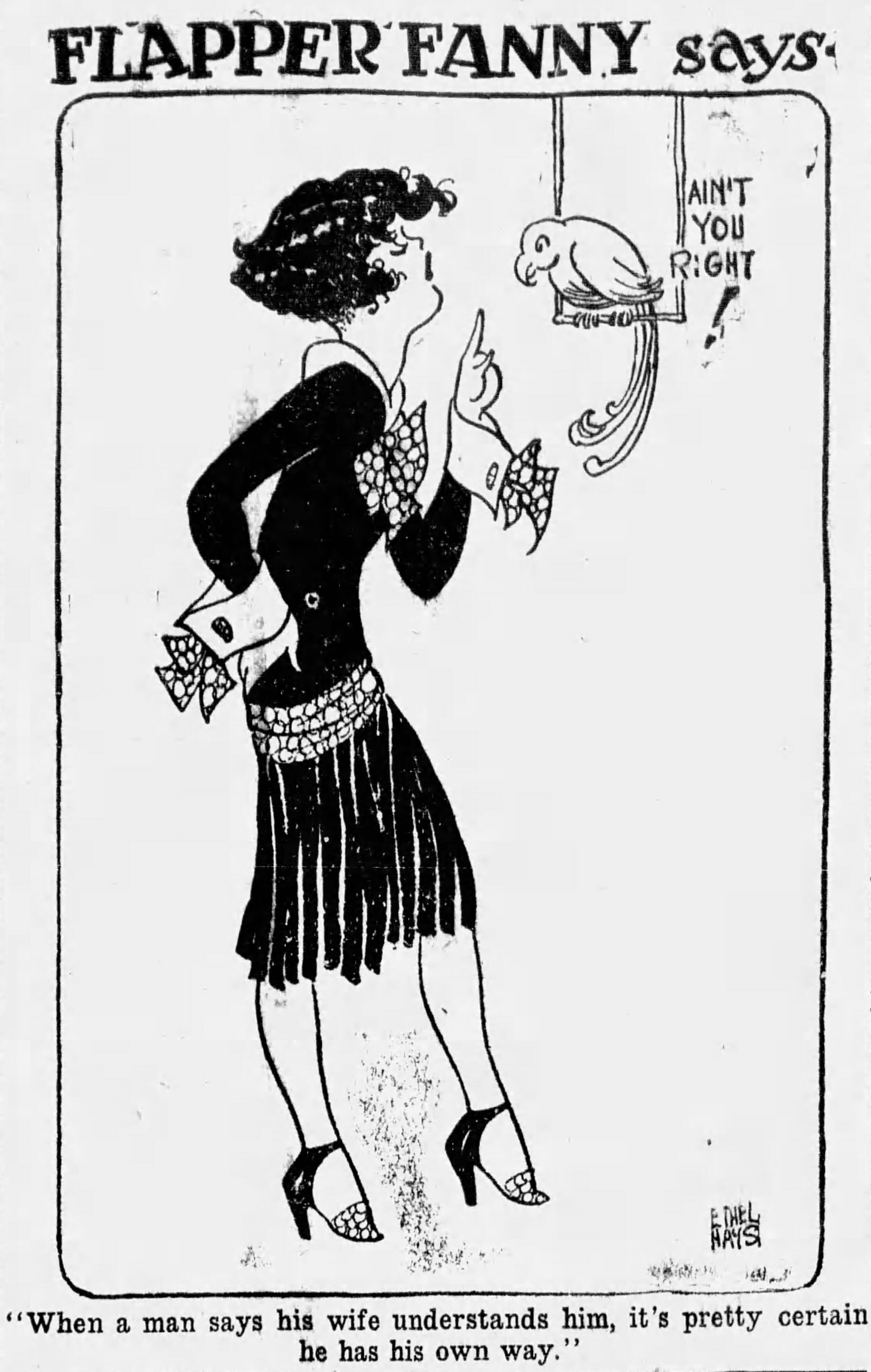
- 1926: "When a man says his wife understands him, it's pretty certain he has his own way."
- Author(s): Ethel Hays (1925–1930); Gladys Parker (1930–1935); Sylvia Sneidman (1935-1940)
- Current status/schedule: Concluded single-panel daily & Sunday strip
- Launch date: January 26, 1925
- End date: June 29, 1940
- Alternate name: Flapper Fanny
- Syndicate: Newspaper Enterprise Association
- Genre: Humor

Flapper Fanny Says was a single-panel daily cartoon series starting on January 26, 1925, with a Sunday page (called Flapper Fanny) following on August 7, 1932. Created by Ethel Hays, each episode featured a flapper illustration and a witticism. The Sunday strip concluded on December 8, 1935; the daily panel continued until June 29, 1940.

At the start, the panel was drawn by notable illustrator Hays, who employed an Art Deco style. Flapper Fanny Says was part of a wave of popular culture that focused on the flapper look and lifestyle. Through many films and the works of illustrators such as Hays, John Held Jr., and Russell Patterson, as well as the writings of F. Scott Fitzgerald and Anita Loos, flappers came to be seen as attractive, reckless and independent.

When Gladys Parker took over the strip in 1930, she gave it a "more cartoony style." The focus slowly shifted from Fanny, now a curly-haired brunette resembling Parker herself, to her little sister Betty, a schoolgirl.

== Publication history ==
Because the syndicate Newspaper Enterprise Association often sold whole packages of features to individual newspapers, Flapper Fanny Says gained widespread distribution almost from the start, appearing daily in perhaps 500 papers within its first year.

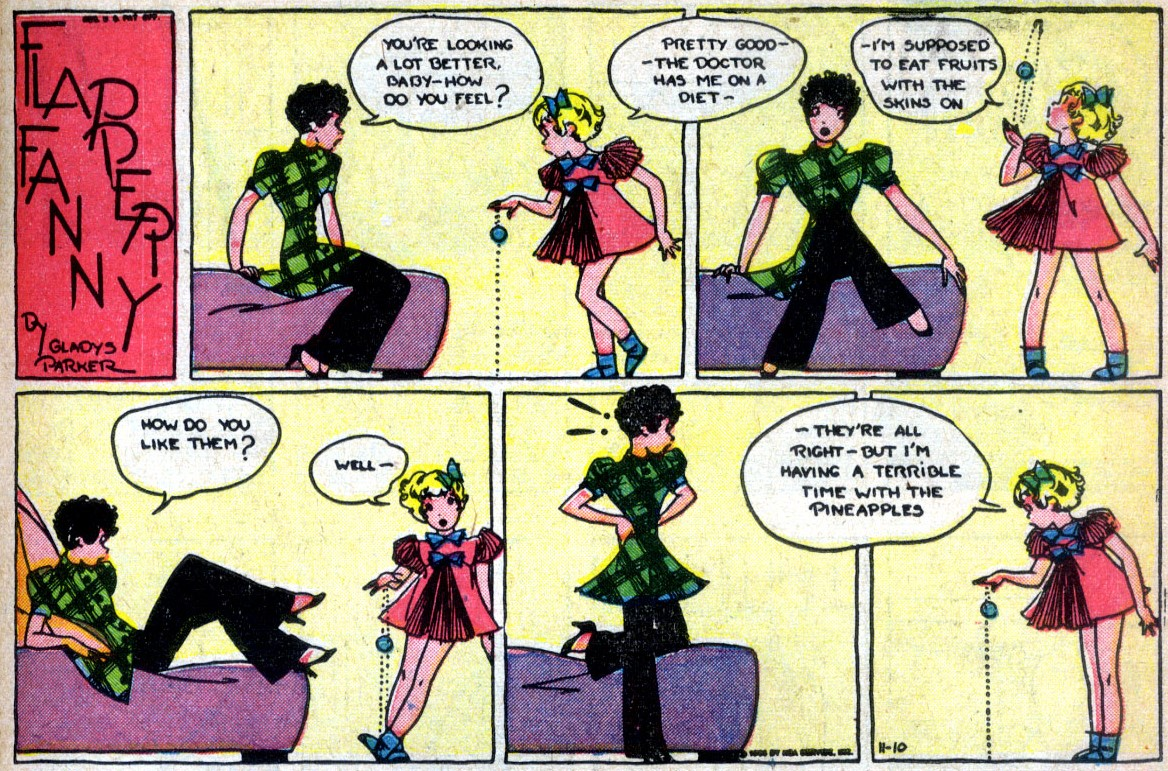
Flapper Fanny by Gladys Parker

Despite this immediate success, Hays—finding the daily workload too heavy after the birth of her second child—turned Flapper Fanny Says over to promising newcomer Gladys Parker starting on March 21, 1930. Parker expanded the daily panel into a Sunday strip with the truncated title Flapper Fanny starting August 7, 1932, and continued both until December 8, 1935.

Parker relinquished Flapper Fanny Says to Sylvia Sneidman on December 9, 1935. That artist, who signed her work only "Sylvia," continued the strip until June 29, 1940. Parker began drawing her own creation Mopsy in 1937, which used the same depiction of herself as she did Flapper Fanny, and occasionally reused Flapper Fanny gags.

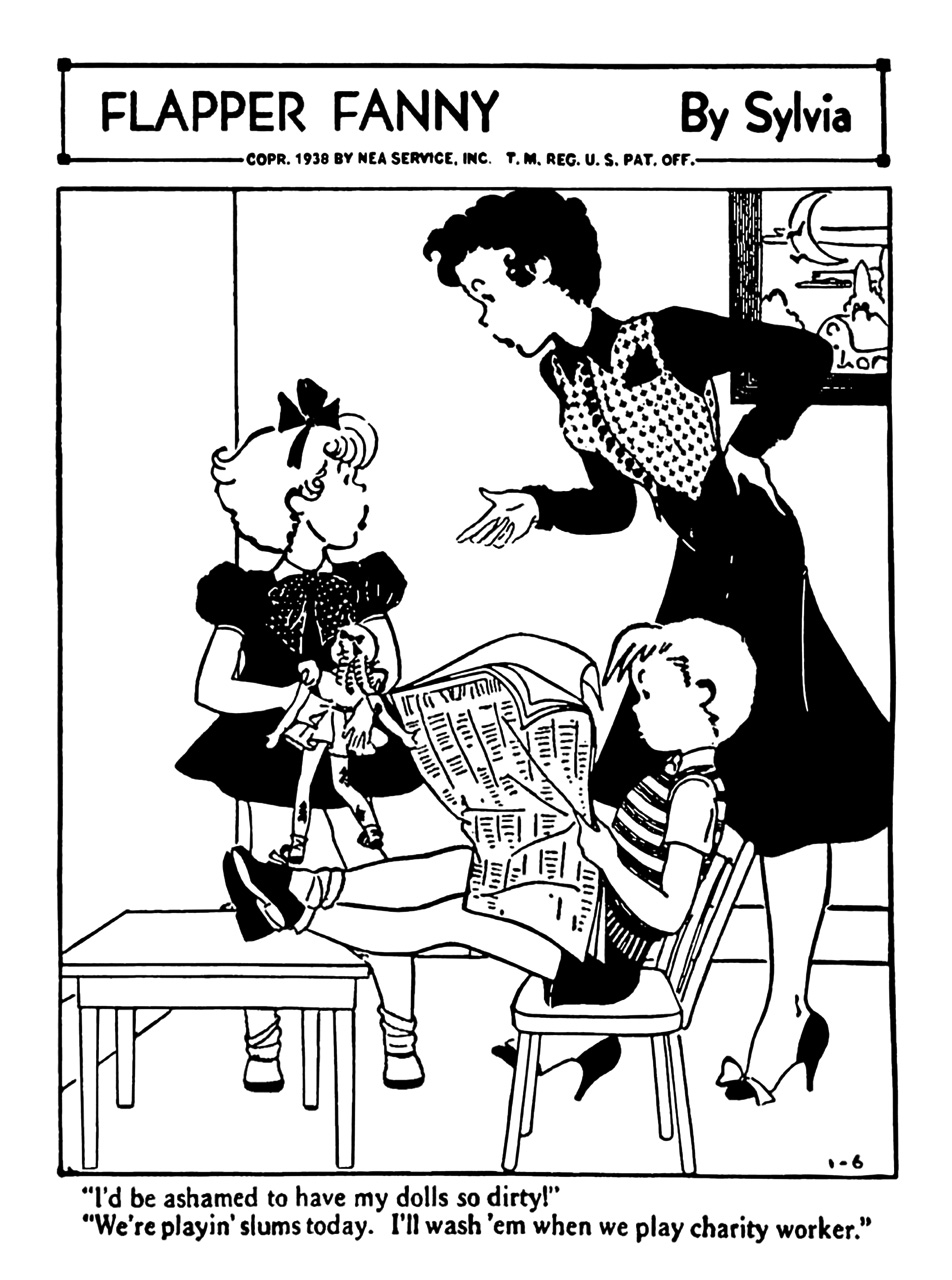
Flapper Fanny by Sylvia, showing Fanny, little sister Betty, and Betty's friend Chuck.

Flapper Fanny Says was imitated in the Jazz Age by Faith Burrows's similarly themed upstart Flapper Filosofy panel from the rival King Features Syndicate.
