= Flapper Filosofy =

American comic strip by Faith Burrows

1930 Flapper Filosofy daily comic panel art by Faith Burrows, minus caption.

Flapper Filosofy (sometimes called Flapper Filosophy) is a newspaper comic panel distributed by King Features Syndicate and the O'Dell Newspaper Service. It ran during the flapper era, from 1929 to 1935. The art was by Faith Burrows.

Each panel exhibited a flapper wearing one of the current fashions, with a witticism typed at the bottom. Burrows drew her panels at an image size of 3" × 6" on Bristol boards measuring 3½" × 6½".

Burrows' series ran in competition for a time with Ethel Hays' similarly themed and well-established Flapper Fanny Says panel from NEA. As writers such as F. Scott Fitzgerald and Anita Loos, and illustrators such as Burrows, Hays, Russell Patterson and John Held Jr. popularized the flapper look and lifestyle through their works, flappers came to be seen as attractive, reckless and independent.

== See also ==
- Ethel Hays
