= Faith Burrows =

American cartoonist (1904–1997)

Faith Burrows' Flapper Filosofy (1930), minus caption.

Faith Swank Burrows (November 17, 1904 – April 11, 1997) was an American cartoonist during the Jazz Age.

In the late 1920s and early 1930s, Burrows drew a daily comic panel called Flapper Filosofy (sometimes spelled Flapper Filosophy) for King Features Syndicate. Each panel exhibited a flapper attired in the current fashions with a humorous caption at the bottom. Burrows' panel ran in competition for a time with Ethel Hays' similarly themed Flapper Fanny Says panel from Newspaper Enterprise Association.

In the early 1930s, she also drew a daily panel, Ritzy Rosalie, for King Features.

Writers in the United States such as F. Scott Fitzgerald and Anita Loos, and illustrators such as Russell Patterson, John Held Jr., Ethel Hays and Faith Burrows popularized the flapper look and lifestyle through their works, and flappers came to be seen as attractive, reckless and independent.

Burrows resided in St. Louis, Missouri at the time of her death.
