= Ethel Hays =

American cartoonist

- Hays in her studio, c. 1930
- Born: March 13, 1892 Billings, Montana
- Died: March 19, 1989 (aged 97)
- Areas: Cartoonist, children's book illustrator
- Notable works: Vic and Ethel, Flapper Fanny Says, Raggedy Ann

Ethel Hays (March 13, 1892 – March 19, 1989) was an American syndicated cartoonist specializing in flapper-themed comic strips in the 1920s and 1930s. She drew in Art Deco style. In the later part of her career, during the 1940s and 1950s, she became one of the country's most accomplished children's book illustrators.

== Biography ==
=== Early training ===
Hays was born on March 13, 1892, in Billings, Montana, where she was raised. She graduated from Billings Senior High. After high school, where she was an illustrator for the school newspaper, she attended the Los Angeles School of Art and Design and then the Art Students League of New York. She won a scholarship to the Académie Julian in Paris, but the start of World War I derailed her studies there. At the time, Hays was on course to become a fine arts painter.

She learned, in her words, "how to paint pretty pictures—never dreaming that I was no pretty picture painter". During World War I, she took on the task of teaching painting to convalescing soldiers in Army hospitals. After encountering a group of students much more interested in learning cartooning instead, she determined to learn that subject herself. She enrolled in the Landon School of Illustration and Cartooning correspondence course and, "keeping a couple of lessons ahead," was able to instruct her class. In this environment, her style of drawing pretty women met with great approval.

=== Newspaper comics and illustrations ===
This experience with comic art changed the course of her career. Hays was subsequently offered work as a staff illustrator for the Cleveland Press, a job procured for her by the designer of the correspondence course himself, Charles N. Landon. Soon after, Landon would be touting Ethel Hays as among the "former students who are now successful comic strip artists" in his magazine ads of the 1920s.

Hays's first work at the Cleveland Press was for a trendy feature called Vic and Ethel, which consisted of flapper-themed satire and social commentary—including stories of "steeple-climbing and swimming in ice-filled lakes" and interviews with visiting celebrities—accompanied by Hays's cartoons. Her first comic strip for Newspaper Enterprise Association (NEA) was derived from that feature and was called simply Ethel in some papers (although it ran in others as Goat Getters). Here Hays continued to chronicle the era when women "bobbed their hair and took up active sports". Even at the beginning of her career, Hays's style was "already polished and breathtakingly lovely".

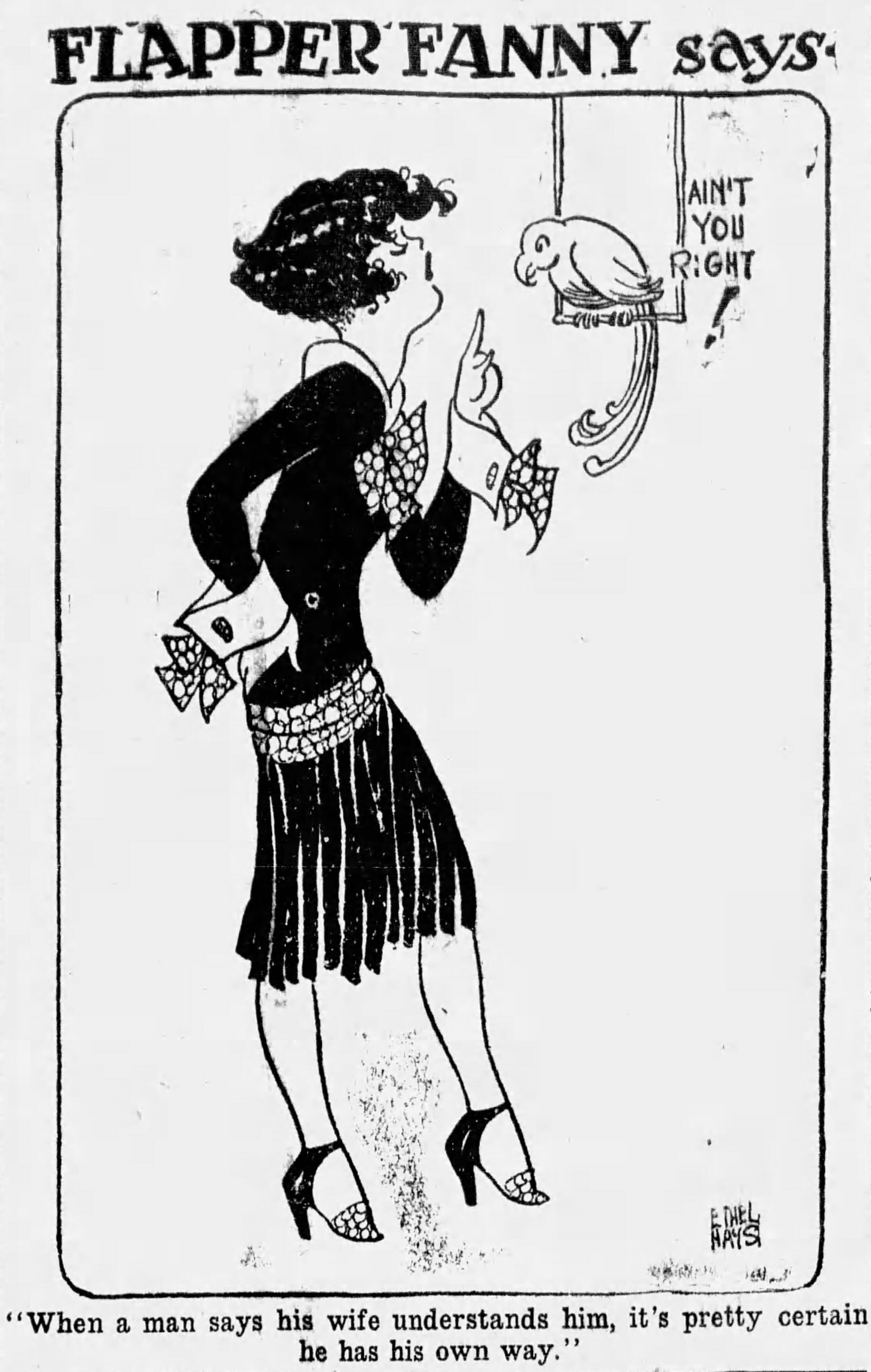
Flapper Fanny Says (1925): "When a man says his wife understands him, it's pretty certain he has his own way."

Hays also drew the noted one-panel cartoon series Flapper Fanny Says, also for NEA and starting in about 1924, with a Sunday page following in 1928. In this panel, which featured a flapper illustration and a witticism, Hays "moved away from the fancy style of Nell Brinkley, drawing sleeker women with short hair—some even wearing pants". Her panel inspired competition for a time from Faith Burrows' similarly-themed Flapper Filosofy from the rival King Features Syndicate.

Ethel Hays was married in 1925 to W.C. Simms of Kansas City, Missouri (she continued to use her maiden name in signing her art throughout her career). By 1928 she was a mother. After she had her second child, she found the daily workload becoming too heavy, and she turned Flapper Fanny Says over to promising newcomer Gladys Parker around 1931. Between 1931 and 1936, however, Hays did find time to illustrate at least 17 stories by noted and prolific author Ellis Parker Butler that were distributed to newspapers. Hays continued to produce a variety of other work for NEA, including full-page illustrations and montages for Every Week magazine, a Sunday newspaper supplement. Her final comic strip for NEA was Marianne, beginning around February 1936, which ran weekly. Comic strip historian Allan Holtz wrote, "While the art was vintage Hays, the gags were strictly jokebook material. You could tell her heart was no longer in it." Her final installment ran on December 26, 1937, though the strip continued without her for another year or two.

=== Transition to children's book illustration ===
In 1938–1940, Hays worked for The Christian Science Monitor, drawing cartoons to accompany a series of poems called "Manly Manners". An instructional children's book collecting the feature was published. During this time her work was also featured on a twelve-month calendar (1939). These painted illustrations of children at play presaged in style and content the work of the next stage of her career.

Hays had created art for books early in her professional career. Leaving newspaper comic strips behind, she began to work more extensively for children's book publishers, illustrating a variety of nursery rhymes, Christmas stories and alphabet books. Some of her more notable art was Raggedy Ann and Andy material for the Saalfield Publishing Company of Akron Ohio. Saalfield had secured the license from the Johnny Gruelle Company in 1944 to produce Raggedy Ann storybooks, coloring books, paper dolls and booklets. Most of the artwork fell to Hays, "whose exuberant, curvilinear style perfectly captured the whimsy and energy of Gruelle's characters". Having been trained in painting, she was well-suited for this type of full-color artwork.

In the 1930s and 1940s, Hays illustrated Puzzle Pages for the publisher McCormick-Mathers of Wichita, Kansas. Puzzle Pages has been described as "a reading seatwork series" for schoolchildren. The workbook pages included sections for reading and writing, as well as words and pictures for cut-and-paste activities. Students might do coloring in Hays's illustrations. The copyright on the series was renewed until at least the 1970s.

=== Assessment and legacy ===
Ethel Hays has been called "one of the more successful women cartoonists of the 1920s". Comics historian Trina Robbins wrote that Hays was "without a doubt the most brilliant of the women cartoonists influenced by Nell Brinkley". Russell Patterson and John Held, Jr. have also been numbered among her early influences. The artist Roy Crane was influenced by Hays, especially in the drawing of beautiful women. Hays's ubiquitous newspaper illustrations helped promote the idea of the 1920s and 1930s fashion style known as the flapper.

She continued to produce newspaper and book illustrations for many years. One source says she retired from commercial art in the 1950s, while at least one other references work into the 1960s. She died in 1989, aged 97.

== See also ==
- Flapper Filosofy
- Faith Burrows
- Virginia Huget
