= Violet Romer =

American actress

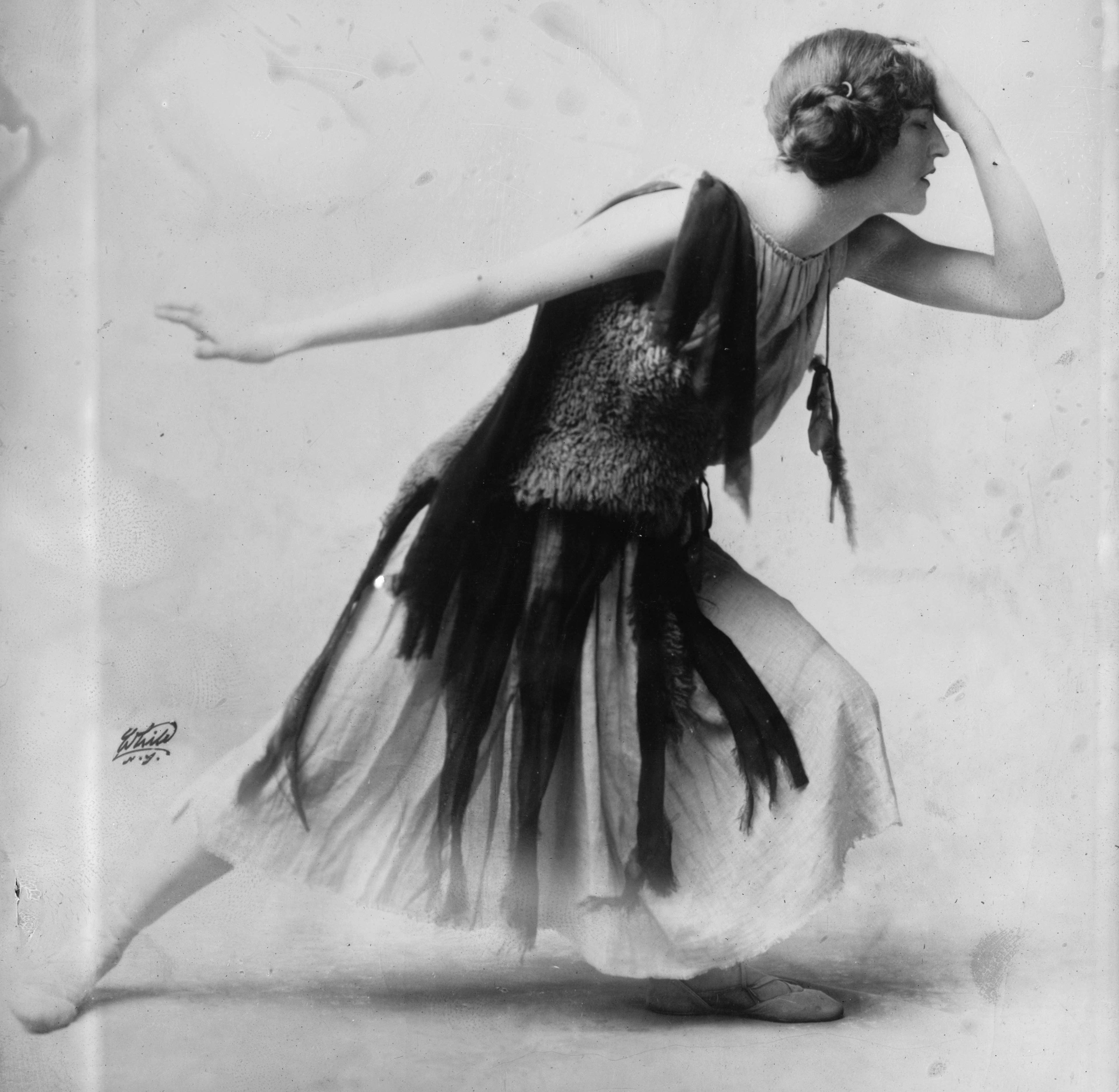
- Violet Romer in a flapper dress c. 1915
- Born: Violet Romer Shawhan; 1886; San Francisco, California, United States
- Died: 1970 (aged 83–84); Port Jefferson, New York, United States
- Occupations: Actress, dancer, flapper
- Parent(s): James McCune Shawhan; Ada Romer Shawhan

Violet Romer (1886–1970) was an American dancer.

== Biography ==
She was born in 1886 in San Francisco, California, and became notable as an American actress, dancer, and flapper.

In addition to being a performer, Romer founded her own dance school.

Romer died in Port Jefferson, New York in 1970.
