= Charles N. Landon =

American cartoonist

- Born: December 19, 1878; Norwalk, Ohio, U.S.
- Died: May 17, 1937 (aged 58); Cleveland, Ohio
- Known for: Illustrator, Teacher, Entrepreneur
- Notable work: Landon School of Illustration and Cartooning

Landon promoted his correspondence school with advertisements like this one from a 1925 issue of Popular Mechanics.

Charles Nelson Landon (December 19, 1878 – May 17, 1937) was an illustrator for The Cleveland Press, art director for the Newspaper Enterprise Association and art editor of Cosmopolitan. He is most notable as the founder of the Landon School of Illustration and Cartooning, a mail-order correspondence course that trained a generation of leading syndicated cartoonists in drawing for publication.

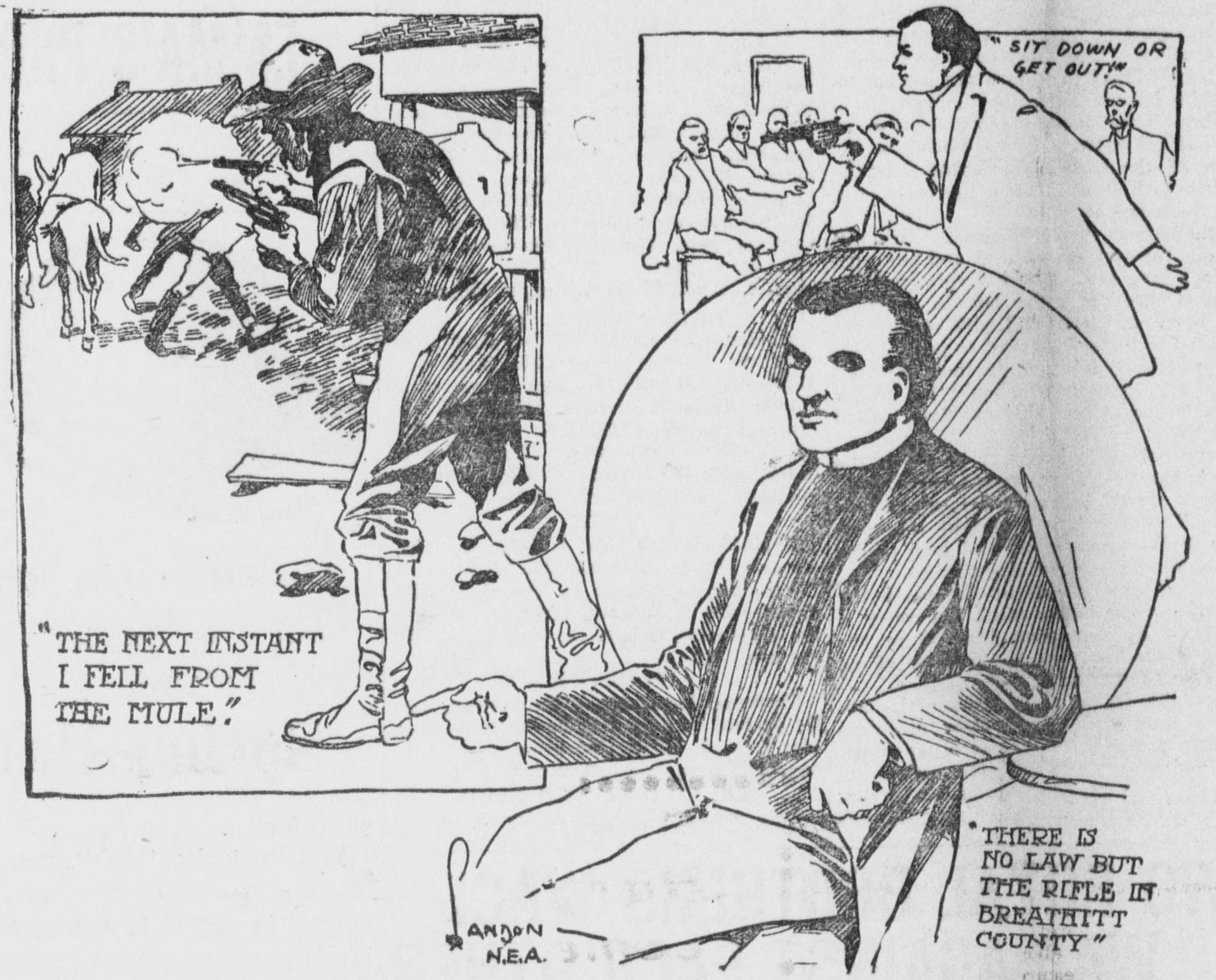
1904 newspaper illustration by Landon

== Biography ==
Born in Norwalk, Ohio, Landon worked for The Cleveland Press from 1900 until 1912, managing the art department—and developing new talent—for the last five years of that time. Later, he became art director at the NEA syndicate. His involvement with his correspondence course, having begun in 1909, coincides with some of his time in both those positions.

=== Landon's comic strip artists ===
While at NEA, he was able to train students through the correspondence course and then personally hire some upon graduation to draw features at the syndicate. Counted among Landon's most successful students were Carl Barks, Merrill Blosser, Gene Byrnes, Milton Caniff, Jack Cole, Roy Crane, V.T. Hamlin, Ethel Hays, Bill Holman and Chic Young. Their names were displayed in Landon's magazine advertisements which touted the accomplishments and high earnings of "former students who are now successful comic strip artists." No one was turned down for the course except applicants under the age of 15. Landon's main competitor was W. L. Evans.

In the case of Ethel Hays, Landon taught her by mail, subsequently hired her as a staff artist for The Cleveland Press, then brought her to NEA to draw syndicated features. Roy Crane was another notable cartoonist whose investment in the course led to an assignment from Landon at NEA.

A facsimile edition of the Landon School course has been edited by John Garvin for the publisher Enchanted Images. It was reviewed by Erick Trickey for Cleveland Magazine:

"You could take the lessons today and learn the basics of cartooning," says John Garvin, an Oregon-based artist and designer and publisher of the book. Landon, a caricature artist for the Press and, later, art director of a Cleveland-based news syndicate, ran his school from 1909 until his death in 1936, critiquing mailed-in work from cartoonists as far away as China and Australia. "He had a multitude of styles he could draw in," says Garvin. Landon's coursebook is filled with sharply inked drawings of portly men, svelte athletes, pretty young women, matronly old ladies, toiling workers, clowny bums and dead-on likenesses of senators and presidents. He mostly taught the popular comics style of the 1910s: caricatures with exaggerated action depicted in heavily textured images with very clean pen lines. But Garvin says some of his lessons, such as his pen-and-ink tutorial, teach skills useful to artists of any era. Landon's study of the hand, Garvin says, "improved my ability to draw hands."

On completion of the correspondence course, students received a small booklet with tips on finding work called How to Market Your Ability.

=== Death ===
Landon died in Cleveland at age 58.

== See also ==
- Art Instruction Schools
- Famous Artists School
- Russell Patterson
