= Flapper =

1920s women's subculture

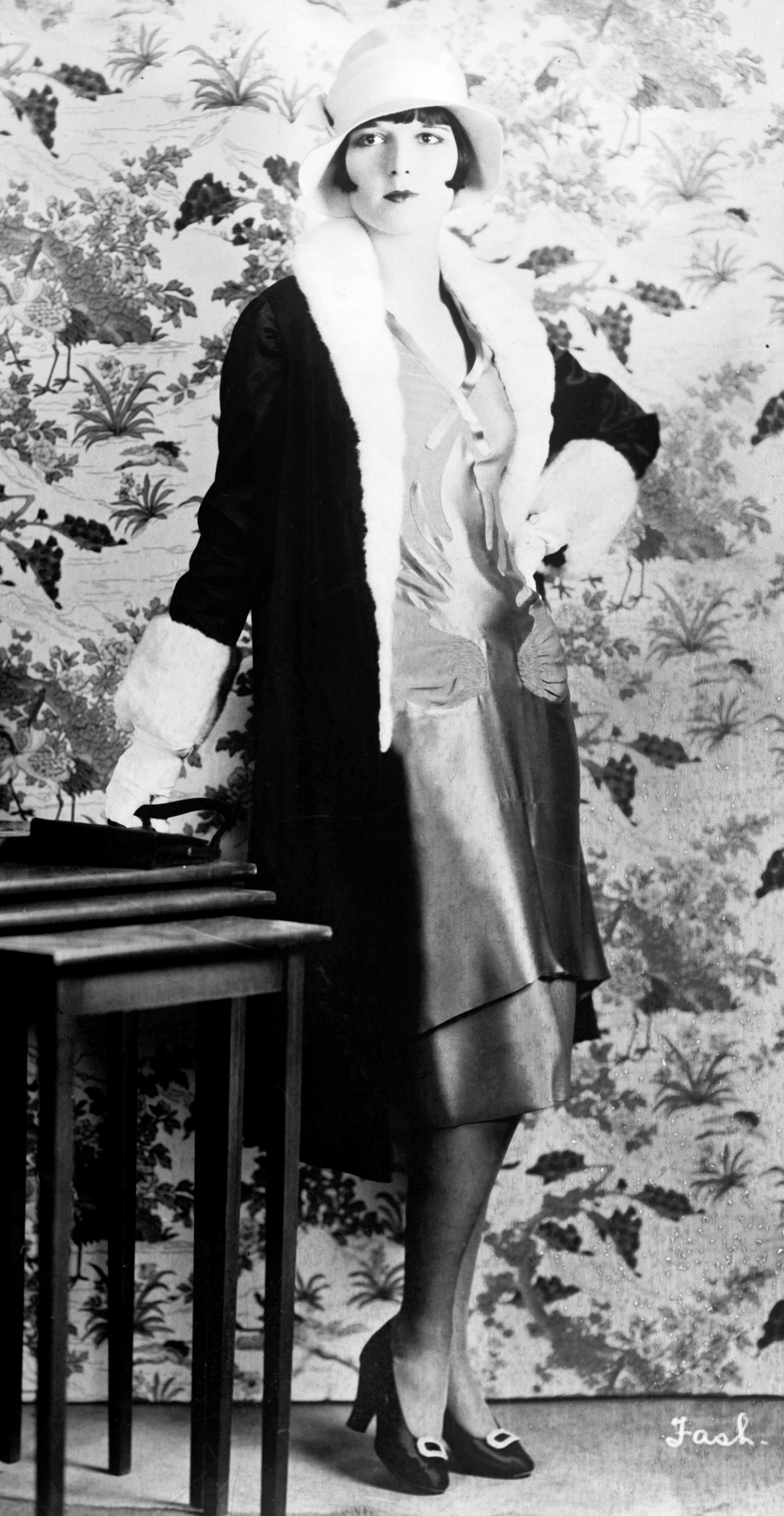
Actress Louise Brooks (1927)

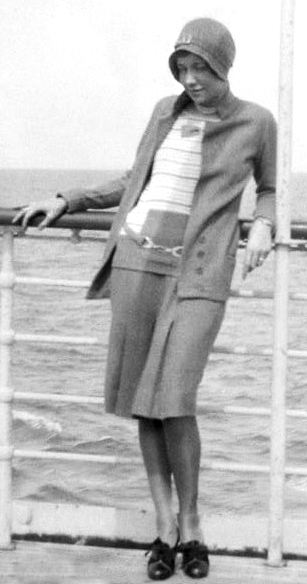
A flapper on a ship (1929)

Flappers were a subculture of young Western women prominent after the First World War and through the 1920s who wore knee-length skirts (considered short during that period), bobbed their hair, listened to jazz, and flaunted their disdain for prevailing codes of decent behavior. Flappers have been seen as brash for wearing excessive makeup, drinking alcohol, smoking cigarettes in public, driving automobiles, treating sex in a casual manner, and otherwise flouting social and sexual norms. As automobiles became more available, flappers gained freedom of movement and privacy.

Flappers are icons of the Roaring Twenties, a period of postwar social and political turbulence and increased transatlantic cultural exchange, as well as of the export of American jazz culture to Europe. More conservative people, who belonged mostly to older generations, reacted with claims that the flappers' dresses were "near nakedness" and that flappers were "flippant", "reckless", and unintelligent.

While primarily associated with the United States, this "modern girl" archetype was a worldwide phenomenon that had other names depending on the country, such as joven moderna in Argentina, garçonne in France, and moga in Japan, although the English term "flapper" was the most widespread internationally.

== Etymology ==
The slang term "flapper" may derive from an earlier use in northern England to mean "teenage girl", referring to one whose hair is not yet worn up and whose plaited pony tail "flaps" on her back, or from an older word meaning "prostitute". The slang word "flap" was used for a young prostitute as early as 1631. By the 1890s, the word "flapper" was used in some localities as slang both for a very young prostitute, and, in a more general and less derogatory sense, of any lively mid-teenage girl.

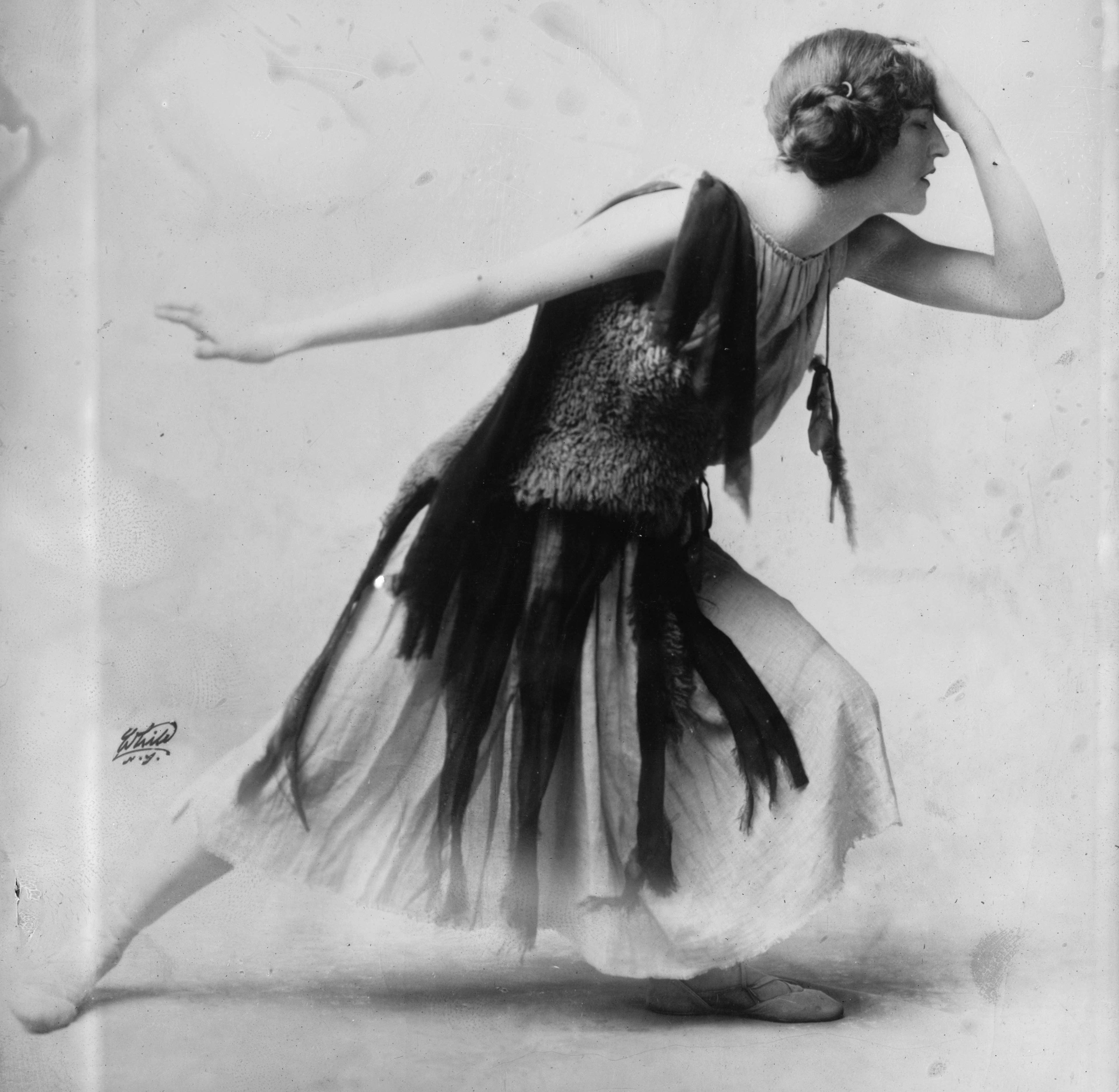
Violet Romer in a flapper dress c. 1915

The standard non-slang usage appeared in print as early as 1903 in England and 1904 in the United States, when the novelist Desmond Coke used it in his college story of Oxford life, Sandford of Merton: "There's a stunning flapper". In 1907, the English actor George Graves explained it to Americans as theatrical slang for acrobatic young female stage performers with hair "still hanging down their backs." The flapper was also known as a dancer, who danced like a bird—flapping her arms while doing the Charleston move. This move became quite a competitive dance during this era.

By 1908, newspapers as serious as The Times used the term, although with careful explanation: "A 'flapper', we may explain, is a young lady who has not yet been promoted to long frocks and the wearing of her hair 'up'". In April 1908, the fashion section of London's The Globe and Traveller contained a sketch entitled "The Dress of the Young Girl" with the following explanation:

Americans, and those fortunate English folk whose money and status permit them to go in freely for slang terms ... call the subject of these lines the 'flapper.' The appropriateness of this term does not move me to such whole-hearted admiration of the amazing powers of enriching our language which the Americans modestly acknowledge they possess ..., [and] in fact, would scarcely merit the honour of a moment of my attention, but for the fact that I seek in vain for any other expression that is understood to signify that important young person, the maiden of some sixteen years.

The sketch is of a girl in a frock with a long skirt, "which has the waistline quite high and semi-Empire, ... quite untrimmed, its plainness being relieved by a sash knotted carelessly around the skirt."

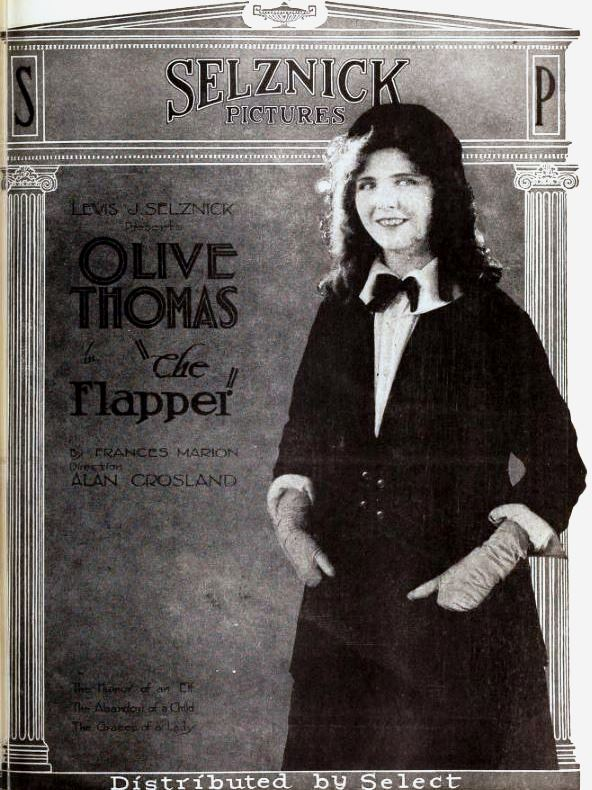
An advertisement for the 1920 silent film comedy The Flapper, with Olive Thomas, before the look of the flapper had started to coalesce.

By November 1910, the word was popular enough for A. E. James to begin a series of stories in the London Magazine featuring the misadventures of a pretty fifteen-year-old girl and titled "Her Majesty the Flapper". By 1911, a newspaper review indicates the mischievous and flirtatious "flapper" was an established stage-type.

By 1912, the London theatrical impresario John Tiller, defining the word in an interview he gave to The New York Times, described a "flapper" as belonging to a slightly older age group, a girl who has "just come out". Tiller's use of the phrase "come out" means "to make a formal entry into 'society' on reaching womanhood". In polite society at the time, a teenage girl who had not come out would still be classed as a child. She would be expected to keep a low profile on social occasions and ought not to be the object of male attention. Although the word was still largely understood as referring to high-spirited teenagers, gradually in Britain it was being extended to describe any impetuous immature woman. (Note: In a 1913 letter a man addressed his 21-year-old girlfriend as his "flapper".) By late 1914, the British magazine Vanity Fair was reporting that the Flapper was beginning to disappear in England, being replaced by the so-called "Little Creatures."

A Times article on the problem of finding jobs for women made unemployed by the return of the male workforce, following the end of World War One, was titled "The Flapper's Future". Under this influence, the meaning of the term changed somewhat, to apply to "independent, pleasure-seeking, khaki-crazy young women".

In his lecture in 1920 on Britain's surplus of young women caused by the loss of young men in war, R. Murray-Leslie criticized "the social butterfly type... the frivolous, scantily-clad, jazzing flapper, irresponsible and undisciplined, to whom a dance, a new hat, or a man with a car, were of more importance than the fate of nations". In May of that year, Selznick Pictures released The Flapper, a silent comedy film starring Olive Thomas. It was the first film in the United States to portray the "flapper" lifestyle. By that time, the term had taken on the full meaning of the flapper generation style and attitudes.

The use of the term coincided with a fashion among teenage girls in the United States in the early 1920s for wearing unbuckled galoshes, and a widespread false etymology held that they were called "flappers" because these flapped when they walked, showing that they defied convention in a manner similar to the 21st-century fad for untied shoelaces. Another such false etymology comes from a 1920s fashion trend in which a young woman would leave her overcoat unbuttoned to allow it to flap back and forth as she walked, appearing more independent and freed from tight, Victorian Era–style clothing.

By the mid-1930s in Britain, although still occasionally used, the word "flapper" had become associated with the past. In 1936, a Times journalist grouped it with terms such as "blotto" as outdated slang: "[blotto] evokes a distant echo of glad rags and flappers ... It recalls a past which is not yet 'period'."

== Influences ==
"In all countries, the First World War weakened old orthodoxies and authorities, and, when it was over, neither government nor church nor school nor family had the power to regulate the lives of human beings as it had once done. One result of this was a profound change in manners and morals that made a freer and less restrained society. Women benefited from this as much as anyone else. Time-worn prescriptions concerning what was or was not proper behavior for them no longer possessed much credibility, and taboos about unaccompanied appearances in public places, or the use of liquor or tobacco, or even pre-marital sexual relationships had lost their force. ... [W]omen were no longer as vulnerable to the tyranny of society as they had been [before]."

— Historian Gordon A. Craig

One cause of the change in young women's behavior was World War I, which ended in November 1918. The death of large numbers of young men in the war, and the Spanish flu pandemic which struck in 1918, killing 20-40 million people, inspired in young people a feeling that life is short and could end at any moment. Therefore, young women wanted to spend their youth enjoying their life and freedom rather than staying at home and waiting for a man to marry them.

Political changes were another cause of the flapper culture. World War I reduced the grip of the class system on both sides of the Atlantic, encouraging different classes to mingle and share their sense of freedom. Women finally won the right to vote in the United States on August 26, 1920. Women wanted to be men's social equals and were faced with the difficult realization of the larger goals of feminism: individuality, full political participation, economic independence, and 'sex rights'. They wanted to have freedoms like men and go smoking and drinking. In addition, many women had more opportunities in the workplace and had even taken traditionally male jobs such as doctors, lawyers, engineers and pilots. The rise of consumerism also promoted the ideals of "fulfilment and freedom", which encouraged women to think independently about their garments, careers, and social activities.

Society changed quickly after World War I. For example, customs, technology, and manufacturing all moved quickly into the 20th century after the interruption of the war. The rise of the automobile was an important factor in flapper culture, as cars meant a woman could come and go as she pleased, travel to speakeasies and other entertainment venues, and use the large vehicles of the day for heavy petting or even sex. Also, the economic boom allowed more people the time and money to play golf and tennis and to take vacations, which required clothing adapted to these activities; the flapper's slender silhouette was very suitable for movement.

== Evolution of image ==
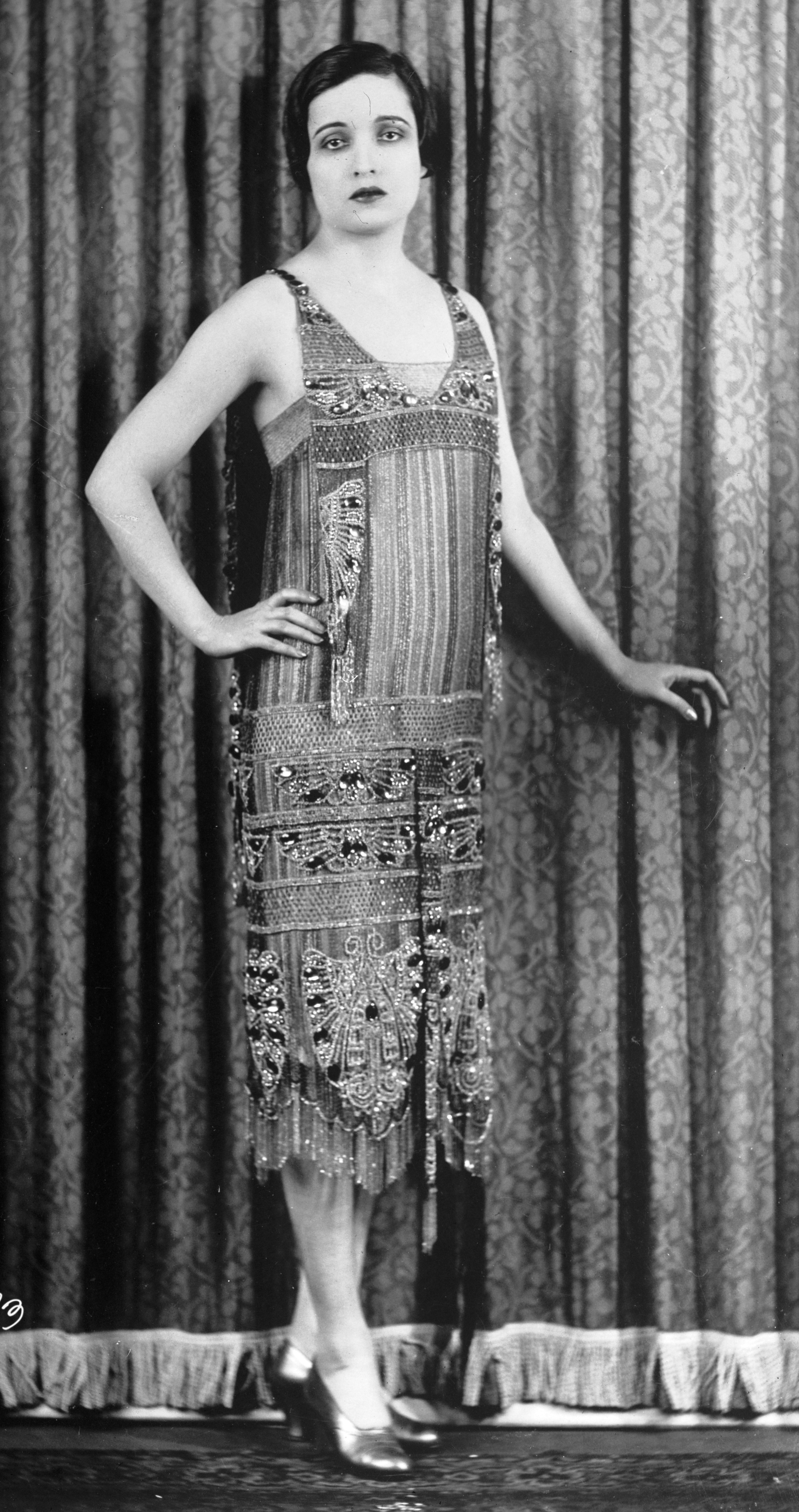
The actress Alice Joyce, 1926

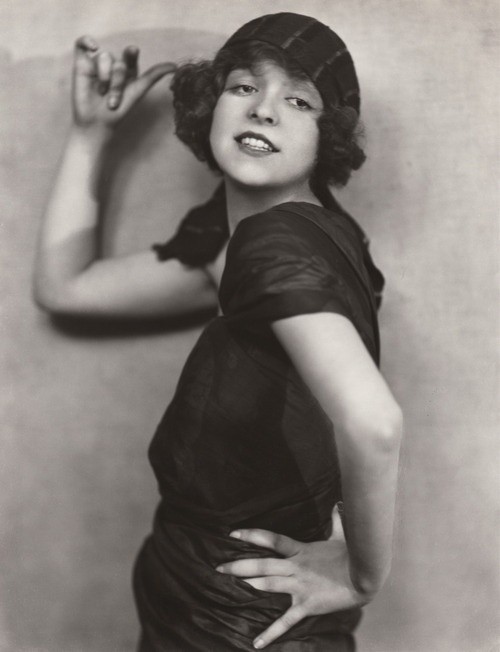
Clara Bow in 1921, before she became a star

The first appearance of the flapper style (Note: The word itself was introduced earlier.) in the United States came from the popular 1920 Frances Marion film The Flapper, starring Olive Thomas. Thomas starred in a similar role in 1917, though it was not until The Flapper that the term was used. In her final movies, she was seen as the flapper image. Other actresses, such as Clara Bow, Louise Brooks, Colleen Moore and Joan Crawford would soon build their careers on the same image, achieving great popularity. F. Scott Fitzgerald wrote of Crawford:

Joan Crawford is doubtless the best example of the flapper, the girl you see in smart night clubs, gowned to the apex of sophistication, toying iced glasses with a remote, faintly bitter expression, dancing deliciously, laughing a great deal, with wide, hurt eyes. Young things with a talent for living.

In the United States, popular contempt for Prohibition was a factor in the rise of the flapper. With legal saloons and cabarets closed, back alley speakeasies became prolific and popular. This discrepancy between the law-abiding, religion-based temperance movement and the actual ubiquitous consumption of alcohol led to widespread disdain for authority. Flapper independence was also a response to the Gibson Girls of the 1890s. Although that pre-war look does not resemble the flapper style, their independence may have led to the flapper wisecracking tenacity 30 years later.

Writers in the United States such as F. Scott Fitzgerald and Anita Loos and illustrators such as Russell Patterson, John Held Jr., Ethel Hays and Faith Burrows popularized the flapper look and lifestyle through their works, and flappers came to be seen as attractive, reckless, and independent. Among those who criticized the flapper craze was writer-critic Dorothy Parker, who penned "Flappers: A Hate Song" to poke fun at the fad. In 1922, Secretary of Labor James J. Davis denounced the "flippancy of the cigarette smoking, cocktail-drinking flapper". A Harvard psychologist reported that flappers had "the lowest degree of intelligence" and constituted "a hopeless problem for educators".

Another writer, Lynne Frame, said in her book that a large number of scientists and health professionals have analyzed and reviewed the degree of femininity of flappers' appearance and behavior, given the "boyishness" of the flapper look and behavior. Some gynecologists gave the opinion that women were less "marriageable" if they were less "feminine", as the husband would be unhappy in his marriage. In Frame's book, she also wrote that the appearance of flappers, like the short hair and short dress, distracted attention from feminine curves to the legs and body. These attributes were not only a fashion trend but also the expression of a blurring of gender roles.

=== Image of youth ===
The flapper stands as one of the more enduring images of youth and new women in the 20th century and is viewed by modern-day Americans as something of a cultural heroine. However, back in the 1920s, many Americans regarded flappers as threatening to conventional society, representing a new moral order. Although most of them were the daughters of the middle class, they flouted middle-class values. Lots of women in the United States were drawn to the idea of being a flapper. There were rival organizations of flappers – the National Flapper Flock and the Royal Order of the Flapper. Flappers shrugged off their chaperones, danced suggestively, and openly flirted with boys. "Flappers prized style over substance, novelty over tradition, and pleasure over virtue." Ruth Gillettes, a 1920s singer, had a song titled "Oh Say! Can I See You Tonight?" which expresses the new behavior of girls in the 1920s. Before the 1920s, for a woman to call a man to suggest a date would be impossible. However, in the 1920s, many girls seemed to play a leading role in relationships, actively asking boys out or even coming to their homes.

== Magazines ==
Magazine covers depicting flappers

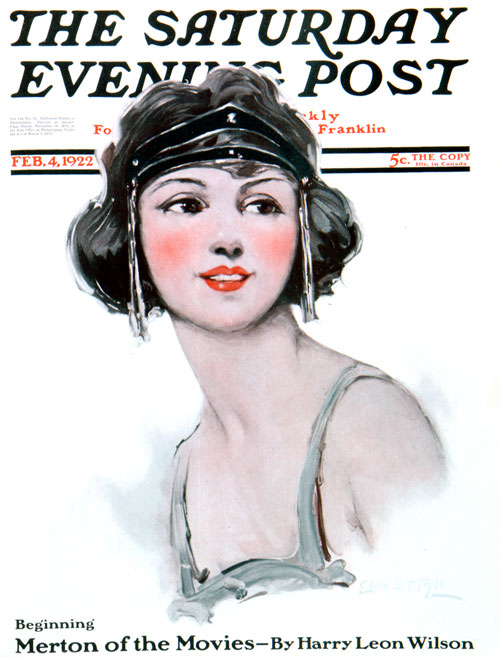
Ellen Bernard Thompson Pyle "The Flapper" Saturday Evening Post (February 4, 1922)

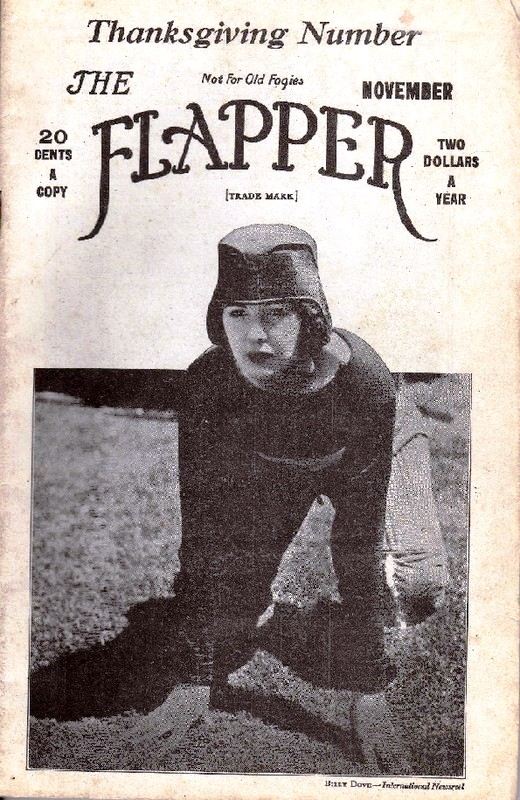
Billie Dove on the cover of The Flapper, subtitled Not for Old Fogies (November 1922)

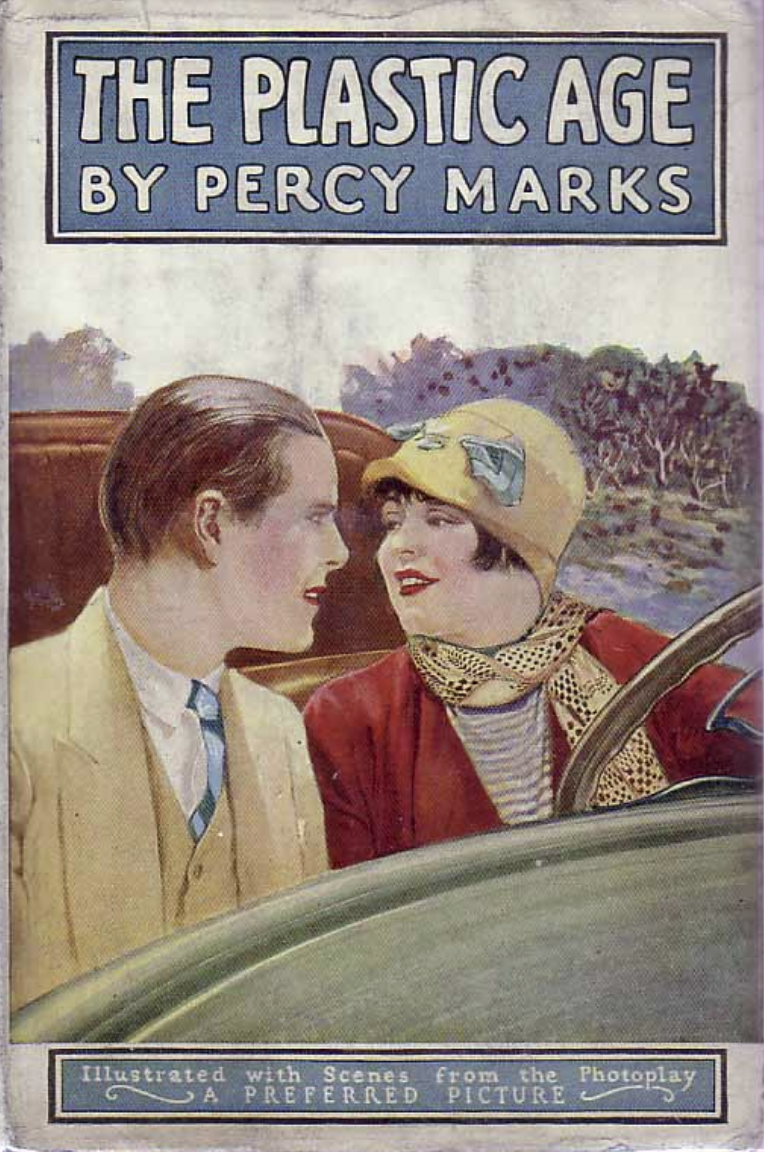
Woman depicted in typical flapper outfit in the cover art for The Plastic Age, 1924

In 1922, a small-circulation magazine – The Flapper, located in Chicago – celebrated the flapper's appeal. On the opening page of its first issue, it proudly declared flappers' break with traditional values.' Also, flappers defended themselves by contrasting their lifestyles with those of earlier generations of women whom they called "clinging vines". They mocked the confining fashions and demure passivity of older women and reveled in their own freedom. They did not even acknowledge that the previous generation of female activists had made the flappers' freedom possible.

In 1923, the flapper magazine Experience included an article on police reform, possibly indicating a concern for societal issues.

In the 1920s, new magazines appealed to young German women with a sensuous image and advertisements for the appropriate clothes and accessories they would want to purchase. The glossy pages of Die Dame and Das Blatt der Hausfrau displayed the "Girl"—the flapper. She was young and fashionable, financially independent, and was an eager consumer of the latest fashions. The magazines kept her up to date on fashion, arts, sports, and modern technology such as automobiles and telephones.

Although many young women in the 1920s saw flappers as the symbol of a brighter future, some also questioned the flappers' more extreme behavior. Therefore, in 1923, the magazine began asking for true stories from its readers for a new column called "Confessions of a Flapper". Some of these were lighthearted stories of girls getting the better of those who underestimated them, but others described girls betraying their own standards of behavior in order to live up to the image of flappers. There were several examples: a newlywed confessed to having cheated on her husband, a college student described being told by a boyfriend that she was not "the marrying kind" because of the sexual liberties she had permitted him, and a minister's daughter recounted the humiliation of being caught in the lie of pretending she was older and more sophisticated than she was. Many readers thought that flappers had gone too far in their quest for adventure. One 23-year-old "ex-vamp" declared: "In my opinion, the average flappers from 15 to 19 were brainless, inconsiderate of others, and easy to get into serious trouble."

So, among the readers of The Flapper, some of them celebrated the flappers' spirit and appropriation of male privilege, while others acknowledged the dangers of emulating flappers too faithfully, with some even confessing to violating their own codes of ethics so as to live up to all the hype.

== Behavior ==
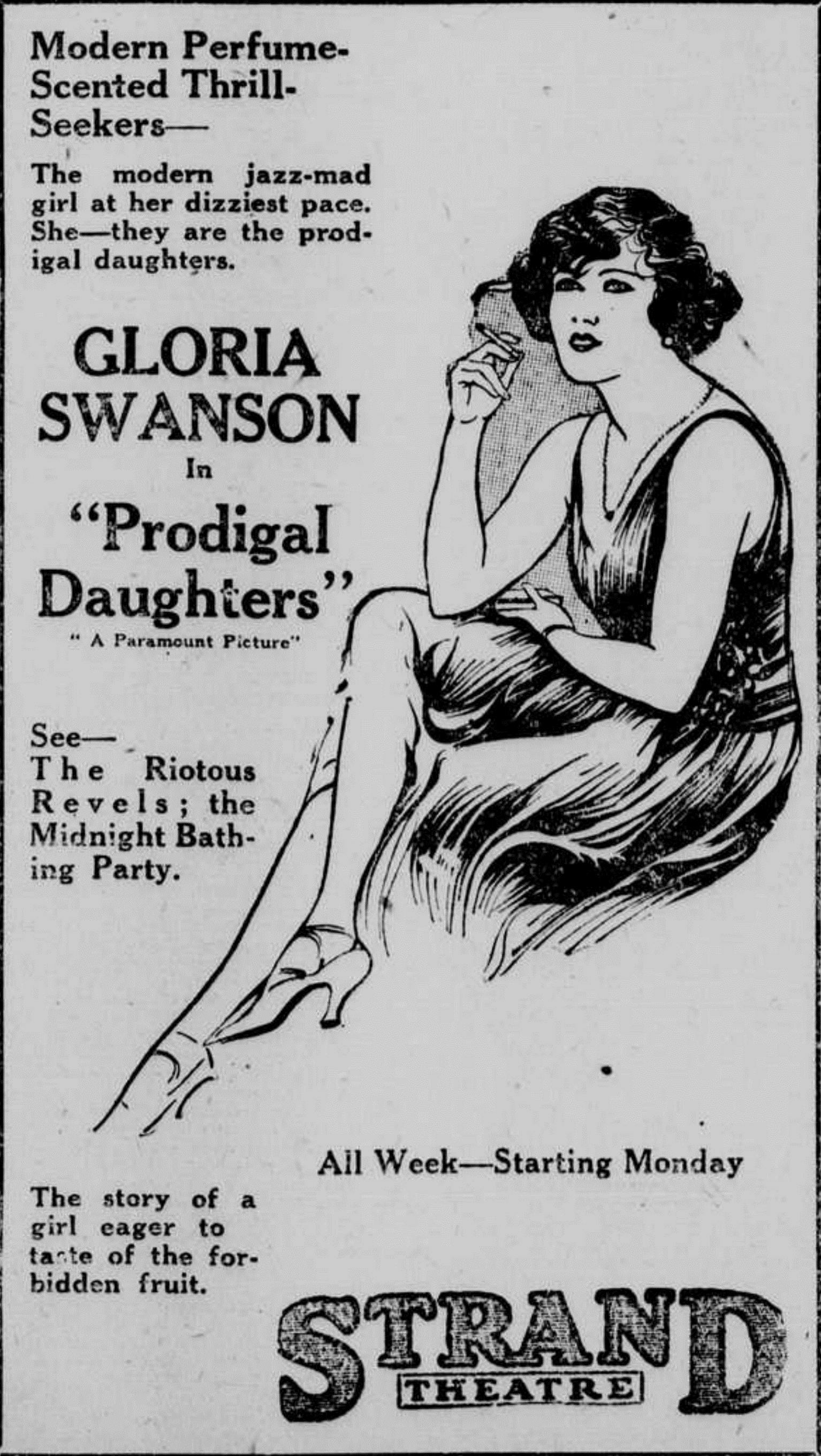
Advertisement for Prodigal Daughters, 1923

Flappers' behavior was considered outlandish at the time and redefined women's roles. In the English media, they were stereotyped as pleasure-loving, reckless and prone to defying convention by initiating sexual relationships. Some have suggested that the flapper concept as a stage of life particular to young women was imported to England from Germany, where it originated "as a sexual reaction against the over-fed, under-exercised monumental woman, and as a compromise between pederasty and normal sex". In Germany, teenage girls were called "Backfisch", which meant a young fish not yet big enough to be sold in the market. Although the concept of "Backfisch" was known in England by the late 1880s, the term was understood to mean a very demure social type unlike the flapper, who was typically rebellious and defiant of convention. The evolving image of flappers was of independent young women who went by night to jazz clubs such as those in Harlem, which were viewed as erotic and dangerous, where they danced provocatively, smoked cigarettes and dated freely, perhaps indiscriminately. They were active and sporting, rode bicycles, drove cars, and openly drank alcohol, a defiant act in the American period of Prohibition. With time, came the development of dance styles such as the Charleston, the Shimmy, the Bunny Hug, and the Black Bottom, which were considered shocking, but were a symbolic badge of the flapper's rejection of traditional standards.

=== Overturning of Victorian roles ===
Flappers also began working outside the home and challenging women's traditional societal roles and the monolithic historical idea of women being powerless throughout social history.

They were considered a significant challenge to traditional Victorian gender roles, devotion to plain-living, hard work and religion. Increasingly, women discarded old, rigid ideas about roles and embraced consumerism and personal choice, and were often described in terms of representing a "culture war" of old versus new. Flappers also advocated voting and women's rights.

In this manner, flappers were a result of larger social changes – women were able to vote in the United States in 1920, and religious society had been rocked by the Scopes trial.

For all the concern about women stepping out of their traditional roles, however, many flappers were not engaged in politics. In fact, older suffragettes, who fought for the right for women to vote, viewed flappers as vapid and in some ways unworthy of the enfranchisement they had worked so hard to win. Dorothy Dunbar Bromley, a noted liberal writer at the time, summed up this dichotomy by describing flappers as "truly modern", "New Style" feminists who "admit that a full life calls for marriage and children" and also "are moved by an inescapable inner compulsion to be individuals in their own right".

=== Petting parties ===
"Petting" ("making out" or foreplay or non-penetrative sex) became more common than in the Victorian era, for example, with the rise in popularity of "petting parties". At these parties, promiscuity became more commonplace, breaking from the traditions of monogamy or courtship with their expectations of eventual marriage. This was typical on college campuses, where young people "spent a great deal of unsupervised time in mixed company".

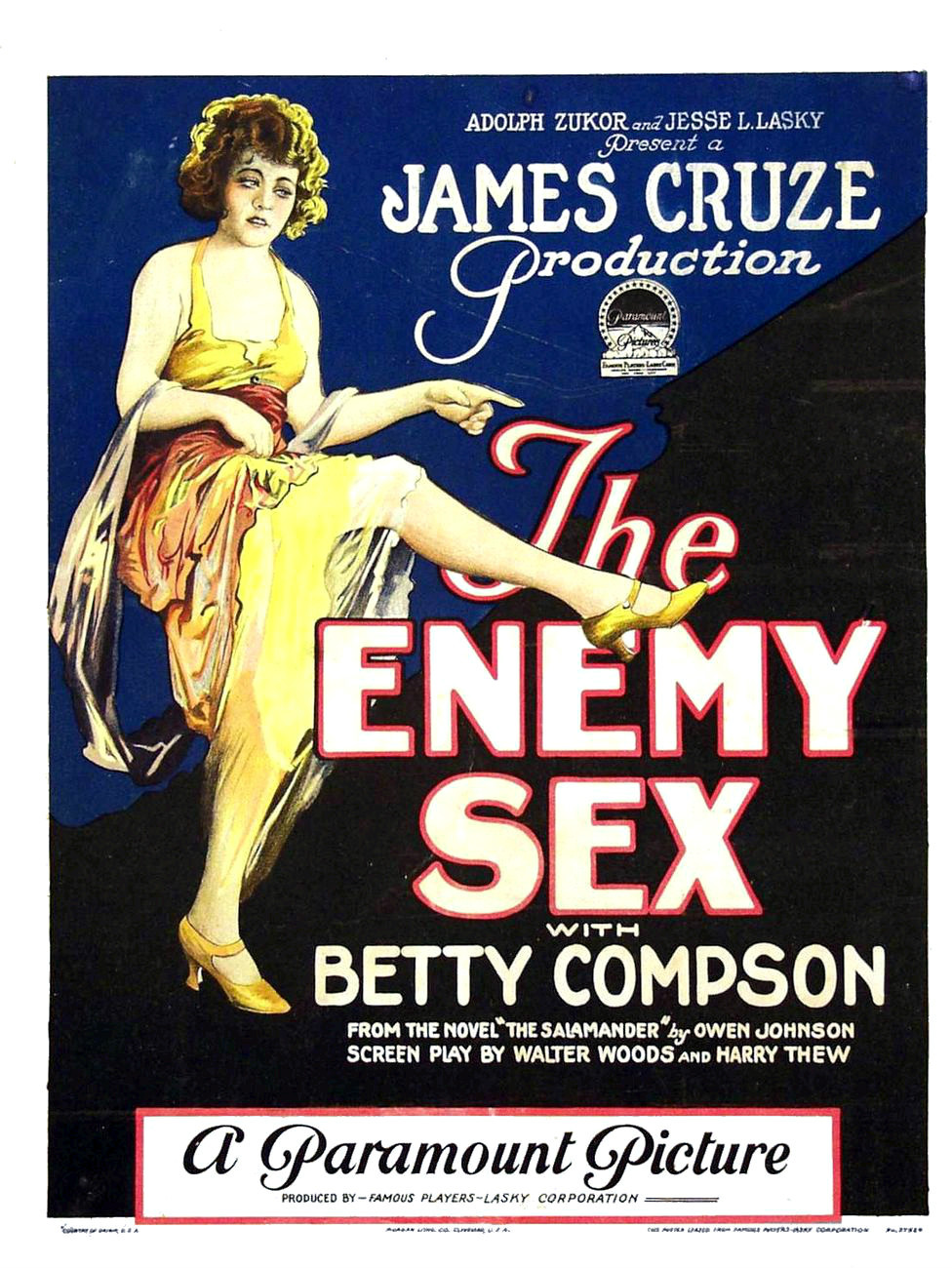
A flapper is featured on the poster for the 1924 film The Enemy Sex

Carolyn Van Wyck wrote a column for Photoplay, an upmarket magazine that featured articles on pop culture, advice on fashion, and even articles on helping readers channel their inner celebrity. In March 1926, an anonymous young woman wrote in describing petting as a problem, explaining, "The boys all seem to do it and don't seem to come back if you don't do it also. We girls are at our wits' end to know what to do. ... I'm sure that I don't want to marry anyone who is too slow to want to pet. But I want to discover what is right. Please help me." Van Wyck sympathized with the problem the writer faced and added, "It seems to me much better to be known as a flat tire and keep romance in one's mind than to be called a hot date and have fear in one's heart."

In the 1950s, Life magazine depicted petting parties as "that famed and shocking institution of the '20s", and, commenting on the Kinsey Report, said that they have been "very much with us ever since". In the Kinsey Report of 1950, there was an indicated increase in premarital intercourse for the generation of the 1920s. Kinsey found that of women born before 1900, 14 percent acknowledged premarital sex before the age of 25, while those born after 1900 were two and a half times more likely (36 percent) to have premarital intercourse and experience an orgasm.

=== Slang ===
Flappers were associated with the use of a number of slang words, including "junk", "necker", "heavy petting", and "necking parties", although these words existed before the 1920s. Flappers also used the word "jazz" in the sense of anything exciting or fun. Their language sometimes reflected their feelings about dating, marriage and drinking habits: "I have to see a man about a dog" at this period often meant going to buy whiskey, and a "handcuff" or "manacle" was an engagement or wedding ring. Moreover, flappers invented slang terms like "hush money", which meant the allowance from a father or "dropping the pilot", which meant getting a divorce. Also reflective of their preoccupations were phrases to express approval, such as "That's so Jake" (Note: First occurring as American criminal slang before 1914.) (okay), "She/he's the bee's knees" (a superb person), "Cake-eater" (a ladies' man), and the popular "the cat's meow" (anything wonderful).

There were two more slang terms that reflected flappers' behaviors or lifestyles, which were "treating" and "charity girls". In the social context of dating, treating was the practice of providing companionship and intimate activity in exchange for entertainment outings, gifts, and other items of monetary value. The activity was prevalent in the large urban areas of the United States from the 1890s to the 1940s and was most commonly engaged in by young working-class women. As treating became more widespread, the activity acquired the label "charity," and the young women who engaged in the more risqué aspects of the practice were often called charity girls.

== Appearance ==
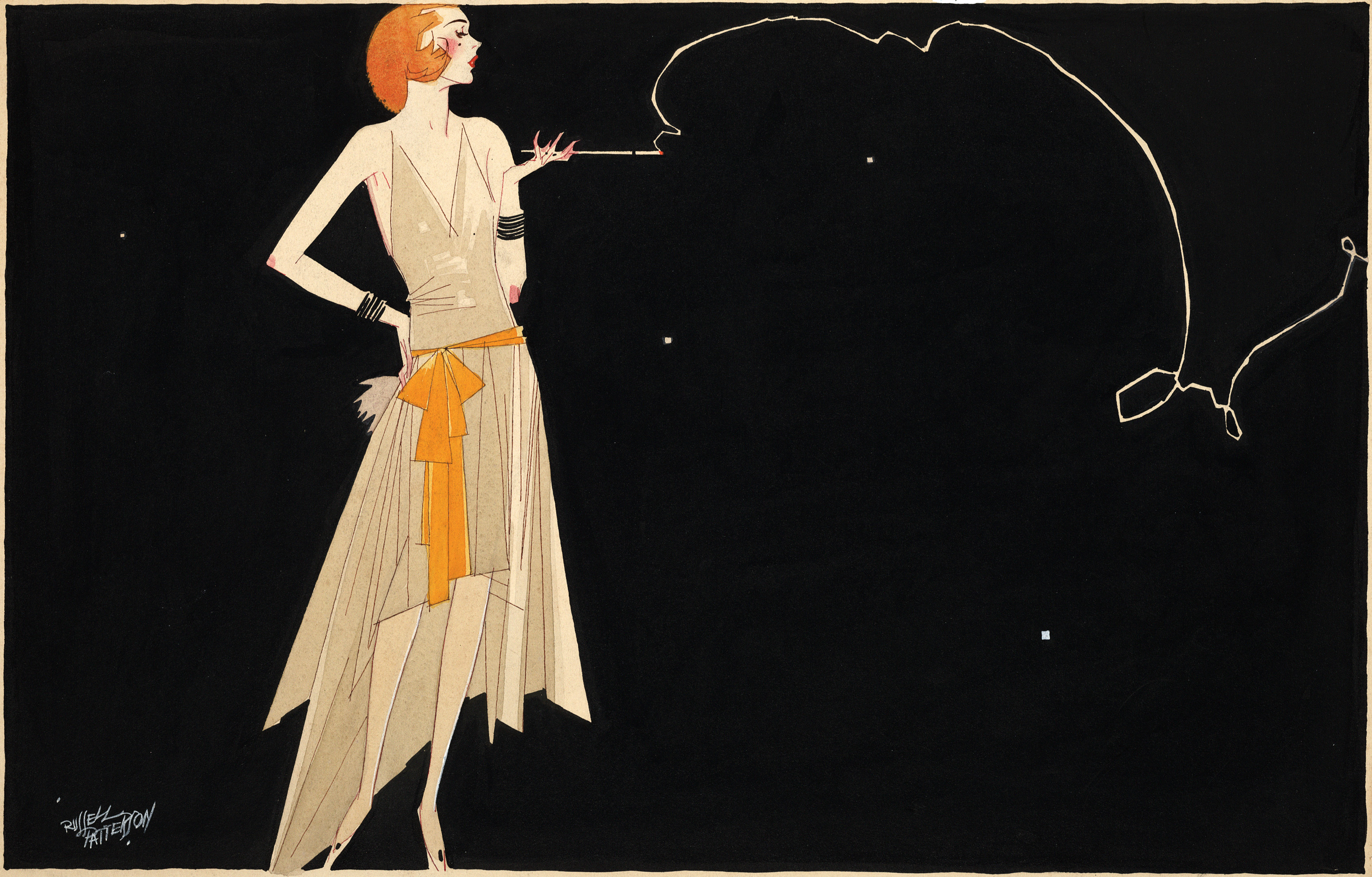
"Where there's smoke there's fire" by Russell Patterson, showing a fashionably dressed flapper in the 1920s.

In addition to their irreverent behavior, flappers were known for their style, which largely emerged as a result of French fashions, especially those pioneered by Coco Chanel, the effect on dress of the rapid spread of American jazz, and the popularization of dancing that accompanied it. Called garçonne in French ("boy" with a feminine suffix), flapper style made girls look young and boyish: short hair, flattened breasts, and straight waists accentuated it. By at least 1913, the association between slim adolescence and a certain characteristic look became fixed in the public's mind. Lillian Nordica, commenting on New York fashions that year, referred to

a thin little flapper of a girl donning a skirt in which she can hardly take a step, extinguishing all but her little white teeth with a dumpy bucket of a hat, and tripping down Fifth Avenue.

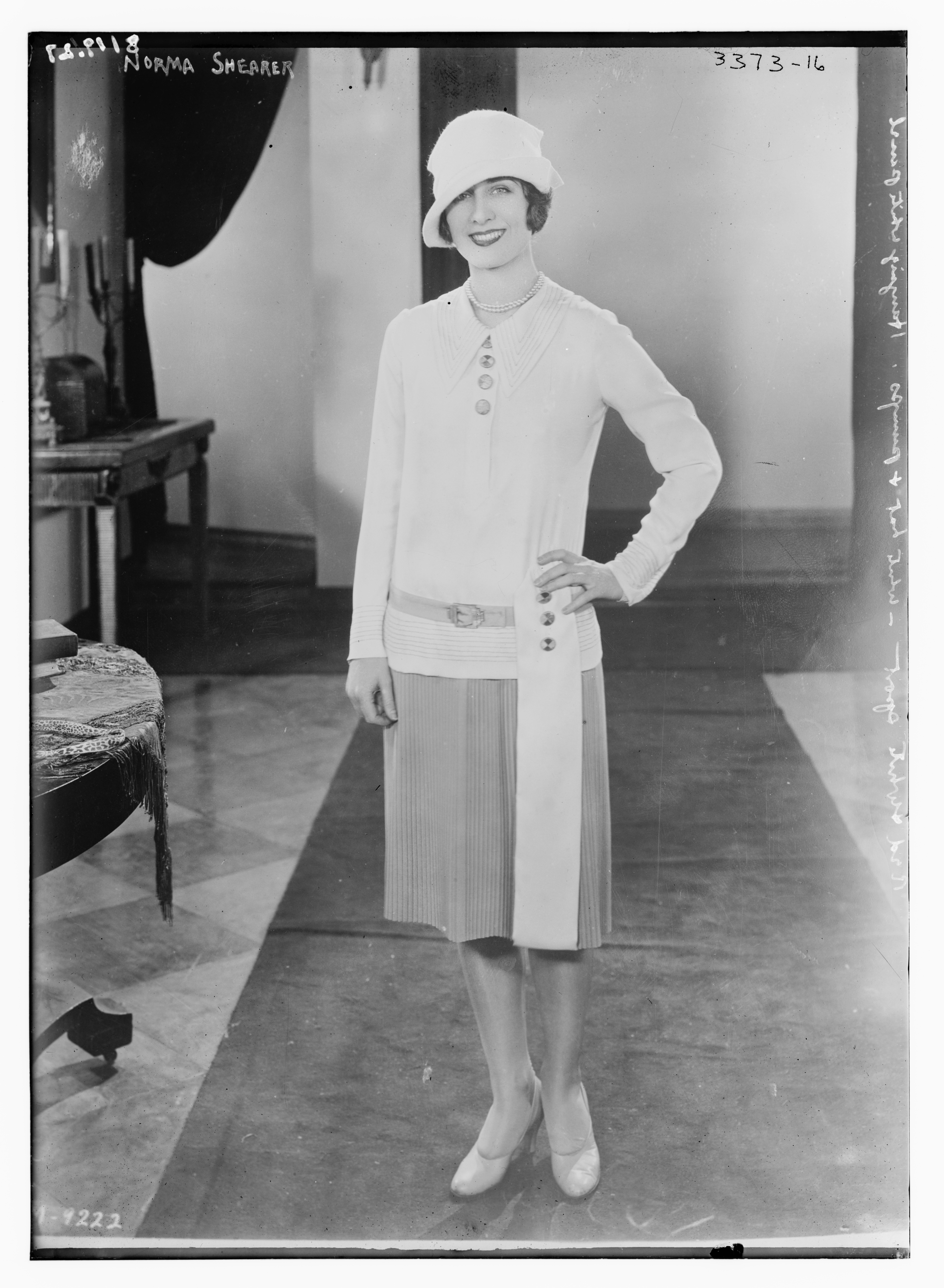
Norma Shearer in 1927

At this early date, it seems that the style associated with a flapper already included the boyish physique and close-fitting hat, but a hobble skirt rather than one with a high hemline.

Although the appearance typically associated now with flappers (straight waists, short hair and a hemline above or around the knee) did not fully emerge until 1925, there was an early association in the public mind between unconventional appearance, outrageous behavior, and the word "flapper". A report in The Times of a 1915 Christmas entertainment for troops stationed in France described a soldier in drag burlesquing feminine flirtatiousness while wearing "short skirts, a hat of Parisian type and flapper-like hair".

Despite the scandal flappers generated, their look became fashionable in a toned-down form among respectable older women. Significantly, the flappers removed the corset from female fashion, raised skirt and gown hemlines, and popularized short hair for women. Among actresses closely identified with the style were Tallulah Bankhead, Olive Borden, Clara Bow, Louise Brooks, Joan Crawford, Bebe Daniels, Billie Dove, Leatrice Joy, Helen Kane, Laura La Plante, Dorothy Mackaill, Colleen Moore, Norma Shearer, Norma Talmadge, Olive Thomas, and Alice White.

Beginning in the early 1920s, flappers began appearing in newspaper comic strips; Blondie Boopadoop and Fritzi Ritz – later depicted more domestically, as the wife of Dagwood Bumstead and aunt of Nancy, respectively – were introduced as flappers.

=== Apparel ===
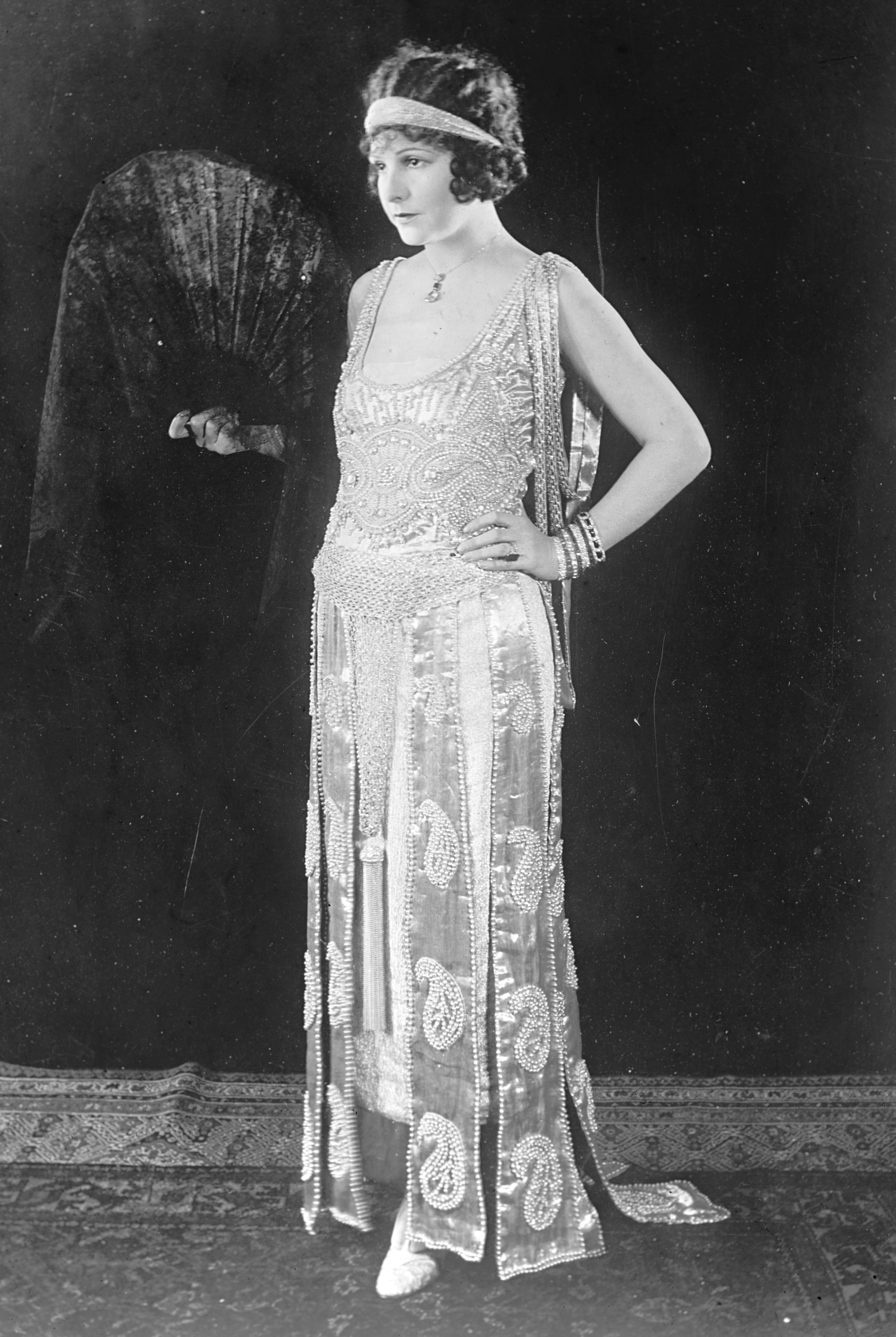
Actress Norma Talmadge

Flapper dresses were straight and loose, leaving the arms bare (sometimes no straps at all) and dropping the waistline to the hips. Silk or rayon stockings were held up by garters. Skirts rose to just below the knee by 1927, allowing flashes of leg to be seen when a girl danced or walked through a breeze, although the way they danced made any long loose skirt flap up to show their legs. To enhance the view, some flappers applied rouge to their knees. Popular dress styles included the robe de style. High heels also came into vogue at the time, reaching 2–3 inches (5–8 cm) high. Favored shoe styles were Mary Janes and T-straps in classic black, gold, silver, or nude shades.

==== Lingerie ====
Flappers started wearing "step-in" panties and simple bust bodices to restrain their chest when dancing. They also chose softer and suppler corsets that reached to their hips, smoothing the whole frame, giving women a straight up and down appearance as opposed to the old corsets that slenderized the waist and accented the hips and bust.

This lack of curves promoted a boyish look. Additionally, flat chests were fashionable and some women wore a type of bra made to pull in the back to flatten the chest, like the Symington Side Lacer.

=== Hair and accessories ===
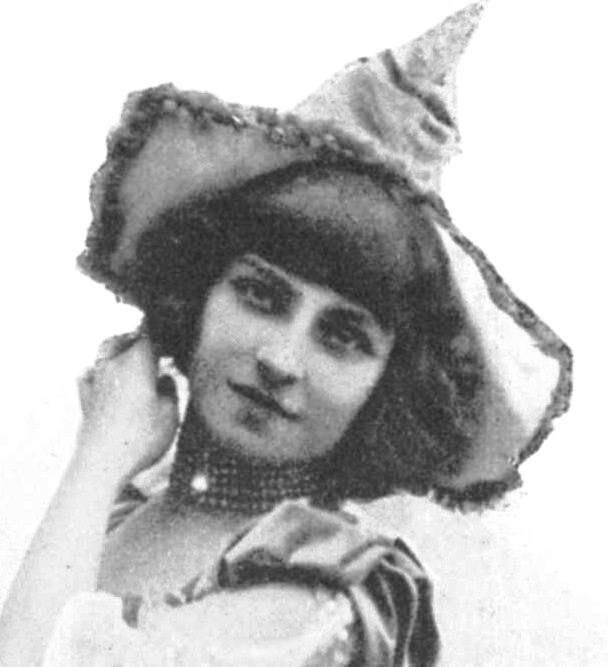
French actress Polaire in 1899

Boyish cuts were in vogue and released the weight of the tradition of women being required to grow their hair long, through popular cuts such as the bob cut, Eton crop, and shingle bob. Finger waving was used as a means of styling. Hats were still required wear, and popular styles included the newsboy cap and cloche hat.

Jewelry usually consisted of art deco pieces, especially many layers of beaded necklaces. Pins, rings, and brooches came into style. Horn-rimmed glasses were also popular.

=== Cosmetics ===
As far back as the 1890s, French actress Polaire pioneered a look which included short, disheveled hair, emphatic mouth and huge eyes heavily outlined in kohl. The evolving flapper look required "heavy makeup" in comparison to what had previously been acceptable outside of professional usage in the theater. With the invention of the metal lipstick container as well as compact mirrors, bee-stung lips came into vogue. Dark eyes, especially kohl-rimmed, were the style. Blush came into vogue now that it was no longer a messy application process. Women shaped their eyebrows needle-thin and penciled them in dark, emulating such actresses as Clara Bow.

Originally, pale skin was considered most attractive. However, tanned skin became increasingly popular after Coco Chanel showed off a tan after a holiday – it suggested a life of leisure, without the onerous need to work. Women wanted to look fit, sporty, and, above all, healthy.

=== American banks and "flapper" employees ===
According to a report in 1922, some banks across the United States started to regulate the dress and deportment of young female employees who were considered to be "flappers". It began with a complaint of a mother in New Jersey who felt dissatisfied because her son did business only with a young female employee, whom she considered illegally attractive. The incident was duly reported to the officials of the bank, and rules adopted regarding requirements in dress for female employees. Those rules included that the dress should not have a pattern, it should be bought from a specific store, it must be worn in either black, blue or brown, its sleeves must not be shortened above the elbow, and its hem must not be worn higher than 12 inches from the ground. After that, the anti-flapper code soon spread to the Federal Reserve, where female employees were firmly told that there was no time for them to beautify themselves during office hours.

== Semiotics and gender roles ==
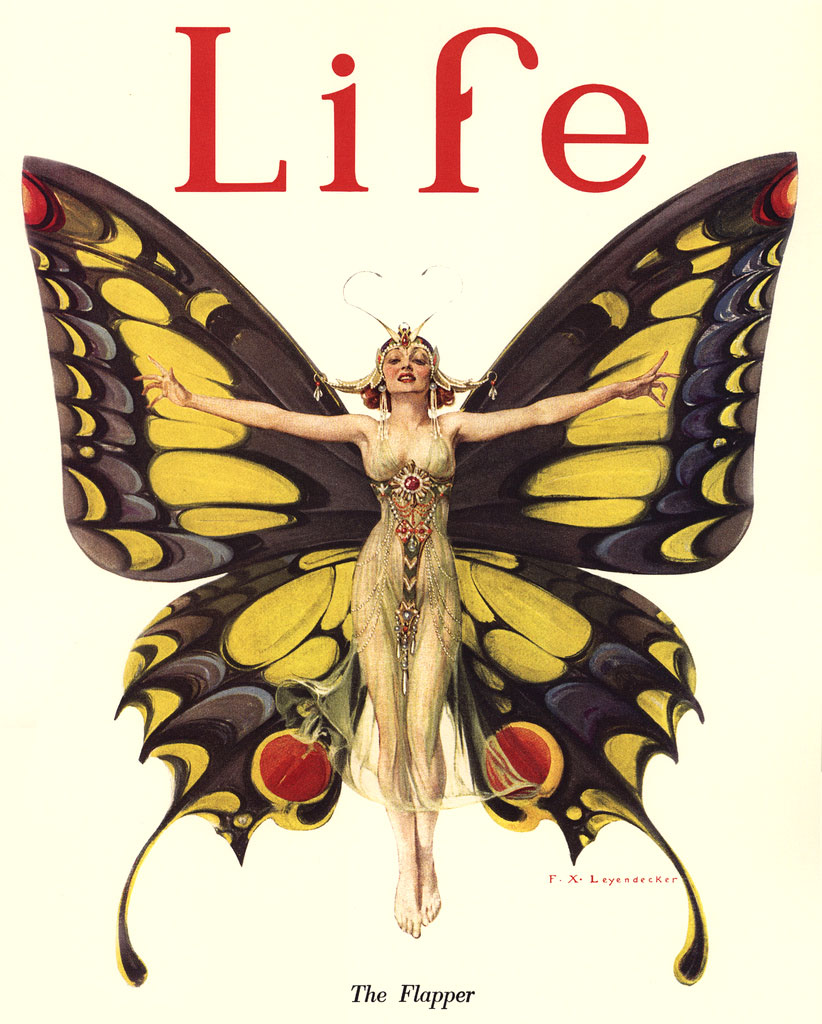
Life Magazine cover "The Flapper" by Frank Xavier Leyendecker, 2 February 1922

Being liberated from restrictive dress, such as laces that interfered with breathing and hoops that needed managing, suggested liberation of another sort. The new-found freedom to breathe and walk encouraged movement out of the house, and the flapper took full advantage. The flapper was an extreme manifestation of changes in the lifestyles of American women made visible through dress.

Changes in fashion were interpreted as signs of deeper changes in the American feminine ideal. The short skirt and bobbed hair were likely to be used as a symbol of emancipation. Signs of the moral revolution consisted of premarital sex, birth control, drinking, and contempt for older values. Before the War, a lady did not set foot in a saloon; after the War, a woman, though no more "a lady", entered a speakeasy as casually as she would go into a railroad station. Women had started swearing and smoking publicly, using contraceptives, raising their skirts above the knee and rolling their hose below it. Women were now competing with men in the business world and obtaining financial independence and, therefore, other kinds of independence from men.

The New Woman was pushing the boundaries of gender roles, representing sexual and economic freedom. She cut her hair short and took to loose-fitting clothing and low cut dresses. No longer restrained by a tight waist and long trailing skirts, the modern woman of the 1920s was an independent thinker, who no longer followed the conventions of those before her. The flapper was an example of the prevailing conceptions of women and their roles during the Roaring 1920s. The flappers' ideal was motion with characteristics of intensity, energy, and volatility. She refused the traditional moral code. Modesty, chastity, morality, and traditional concepts of masculinity and femininity were seemingly ignored. The flapper was making an appeal to authority and was being attached to the impending "demoralization" of the country.

The Victorian American conception of sexuality and other roles of men and women in society and to one another were being challenged. Modern clothing was lighter and more flexible, better suiting the modern woman such as the flapper who wanted to engage in active sport. Women were now becoming more assertive and less willing to keep the home fires burning. The flappers' costume was seen as sexual and raised deeper questions of the behavior and values it symbolized.

== End of era ==
During the early 1920s, legislators in several states proposed laws regulating women's dress. A 1921 Utah bill, for example, would have imposed penalties for wearing skirts more than three inches (7.5 cm) above the ankle; comparable measures were proposed elsewhere, but generally did not become state law.

An obituary for the "Flapper" ran in The New York Times Magazine in 1929, suggesting that she was being replaced by the "Siren", a mysterious, stylish, "vaguely European" ideal woman. The flapper lifestyle and look disappeared and the roaring '20s era of glitz and glamour came to an end in America after the Wall Street crash of 1929. Unable to afford the latest trends and lifestyle, the once-vibrant flapper women returned to their dropped hemlines, and the flapper dress disappeared. A sudden serious tone washed over the public with the appearance of the Great Depression. The high-spirited attitude and hedonism were less acceptable during the economic hardships of the 1930s. The popular bobbed haircut was the cause for some women being fired from their jobs.

== See also ==
- Betty Boop
- Generation gap
- Hawksian woman
- Interbellum Generation
- Jazz Age
- Lost Generation
- Modern girl
- New Woman
- Thoroughly Modern Millie, 1962 film and 2002 stage musical
- 1929 United Kingdom general election, "the flapper election"
- Youth culture
- Zelda Fitzgerald
