= Russell Patterson =

American cartoonist

- Russell Patterson arrives in Hollywood in 1937 for the filming of Artists and Models.
- Born: December 26, 1893 Omaha, Nebraska
- Died: March 17, 1977 (aged 83) Atlantic City, New Jersey
- Areas: Illustrator, costumer and scenic designer, cartoonist
- Notable works: Life covers, scenic designs for Paramount's film Give Me a Sailor (1938); Mamie comic strip.
- Awards: National Cartoonists Society Advertising and Illustration Award (1957); Elzie Segar Award (1974)

Russell Patterson (December 26, 1893 – March 17, 1977) was an American cartoonist, illustrator and scenic designer. Patterson's art deco magazine illustrations helped develop and promote the idea of the 1920s and 1930s fashion style known as the flapper.

Russell H. Patterson was born in Omaha, Nebraska. Although he claimed he knew at age 17 that he wanted to be a magazine cover artist, he took a circuitous route to his ultimate success in that field. His family left his hometown of Omaha and settled in Montreal when he was still a boy. He studied architecture briefly at McGill University, then became an undistinguished cartoonist for some newspapers in Montreal, contributing Pierre et Pierrette to La Patrie. Rejected by the Canadian army at the start of World War I, he moved to Chicago to become a catalog illustrator. His early career included interior design for department stores like Carson Pirie Scott & Company and Marshall Field's.

A trip to Paris gave him the opportunity to paint and attend life-drawing classes. However, it also left him in debt, and so he reluctantly returned to the dull work of advertising art in Chicago.

From 1916 to 1919, he intermittently attended the Art Institute of Chicago. From 1922 to 1925, Patterson, as Charles N. Landon had done before, distributed a mail-order art instruction course. Consisting of 20 lessons, it was called "The Last Word in Humorous Illustrations." Despite the finality suggested by that title, he afterwards contributed to the instruction books of the Art Instruction Schools.

In 1924, Patterson made an attempt to carve out a living as a fine artist. Traveling to the Southwest with his paintings, however, he found the art galleries indifferent to his work.

== Illustration ==
Patterson became famous for covers like this one for Life (March 10, 1927).

In 1925, having arrived in New York City, Patterson suddenly found his direction. He put aside his fine arts ambitions and turned his talents toward illustration. Drawing on his experience sketching beautiful women in Paris, he began adorning covers and interiors for magazines like College Humor and Judge, and later Life and Ballyhoo with his vivacious flappers. Within a couple of years, Russell Patterson the illustrator went from obscurity to celebrity, at a time when the leading graphic artists were as famous as movie stars. As his career blossomed, his ubiquitous version of the modern Jazz Age woman graced the covers and interior pages of The Saturday Evening Post, Vogue, Vanity Fair, Cosmopolitan, Redbook and Photoplay, among many other magazines. As celebrated at that time as the "Gibson Girl" had been years before, his "Patterson Girl" was, in the words of Armando Mendez, "simultaneously brazen and innocent." By incorporating the day's faddish "raccoon coats and flapping, unbuckled galoshes in his drawings, Patterson became a pacemaker in setting styles." Women of the time turned to Patterson's work to follow trends in clothing, jewelry and cosmetics. Martha H. Kennedy cites Patterson's dependence on the "graphic power of elegant, outlined forms, linear patterns of clothing and trailing smoke to compose strongly decorative, eye-catching designs."

In the late 1930s he was designing Christmas toy windows for In 1940 he took on a job from, creating a promotional item called "The Great Map of New York" (Patterson had just prior begun a run of five annual R.H. Macy & Co. Christmas-toy window designs). The large map was illuminated and captioned in a style that evoked such charts from the Age of Discovery. Text on the map described it as "A chart neither too literal nor too emotional, shewing the city New York replete with the wondrous Spectacles, Mysteries, and Pastimes of the natives... Done in the year of the New York World's Fair – 1939."

== Broadway ==
Branching out from magazine illustration, Patterson worked on Broadway on a number of productions in various creative capacities: The Gang's All Here (1931) as Costume Designer; Ballyhoo of 1932 (1932) as Costume Designer, Director and Scenic Designer; Hold Your Horses (1933) as Costume Designer and Scenic Designer; Fools Rush In (1934) as Scenic Designer; Ziegfeld Follies of 1934 as Costume Designer; and George White's Scandals (1936) as Scenic Designer.

== Films ==
One of Patterson's rough scenic designs, for the film Give Me a Sailor (1938).

He also worked in Hollywood for the silver screen. Patterson had an on-screen part playing himself in, and created lifelike dolls he called "Personettes" for, the film Artists and Models, which starred Jack Benny (four other cartoonists including Rube Goldberg also appeared). A New York Times movie reviewer wrote on August 5, 1937, "the appearance of the 'Personettes' struck me as satire of a high order. The puppets, you see, have a production number of their own… It seemed to me to be the perfect spoof of the usual song-and-dance interlude, proving how unnecessary it really is and how easy to duplicate (in fact, improve upon) with dolls." Patterson was art director on Stand Up and Cheer! (1934), and designed costumes and dance sets for Bottoms Up (1934). He also designed scenes and costumes for other films such as the Bob Hope and Martha Raye vehicle, Give Me a Sailor (1938). He designed Shirley Temple's wardrobe for her film, Baby, Take a Bow (1934).

Russell Patterson's Mamie (December 13, 1953)

== Comic strips ==
In 1929 Patterson began illustrating Sunday newspaper magazine cover series for the Hearst chain. Among the series was "Runaway Ruth" (1929), "Wings of Love" (1929–30), "Get-Your-Man Gloria" (c.1932), "The Countess & the Cowboy" (c. 1932), and "Carolyn's Cadet" (c. 1932). Each series ran for several months, and Patterson produced these on a semi-regular basis until 1933.

Patterson returned to the newspaper fold as the 1940s approached. He collaborated with writers Carolyn Wells and Percy Shaw on several series for the American Weekly Hearst Sunday magazine, all featuring the character Flossy Frills. These full-page works ran as front covers on the magazine from late 1939 to 1943 or after. Patterson's was perhaps the very last Sunday magazine comic strip series produced. From 1942-46 he produced a Sunday and daily panel cartoon series for Hearst's King Features Syndicate titled "Pin-Up Girls".

In 1951, Patterson created the cartoon Mamie, a Sunday page for United Feature Syndicate. Mamie was part of a revival of the glamorous "dumb blonde" in comics, in the movies and on the stage. The strip's beautiful lead was lovingly rendered, as was the New York City setting. Patterson added a panel of paper dolls to many of these Sunday comics. Maurice Horn called Mamie an "elegantly drawn, exquisitely composed page", but with "thin" humor, "a flapper strip that had somehow wandered into the wrong decade." Still, it ran until 1956 on the strength of Patterson's art and fashion-sense.

During the 1960s, arthritis began to limit his ability to draw. Patterson began mentoring younger artists as a faculty member of the National Institute of Art and Design.

== Legacy and awards ==
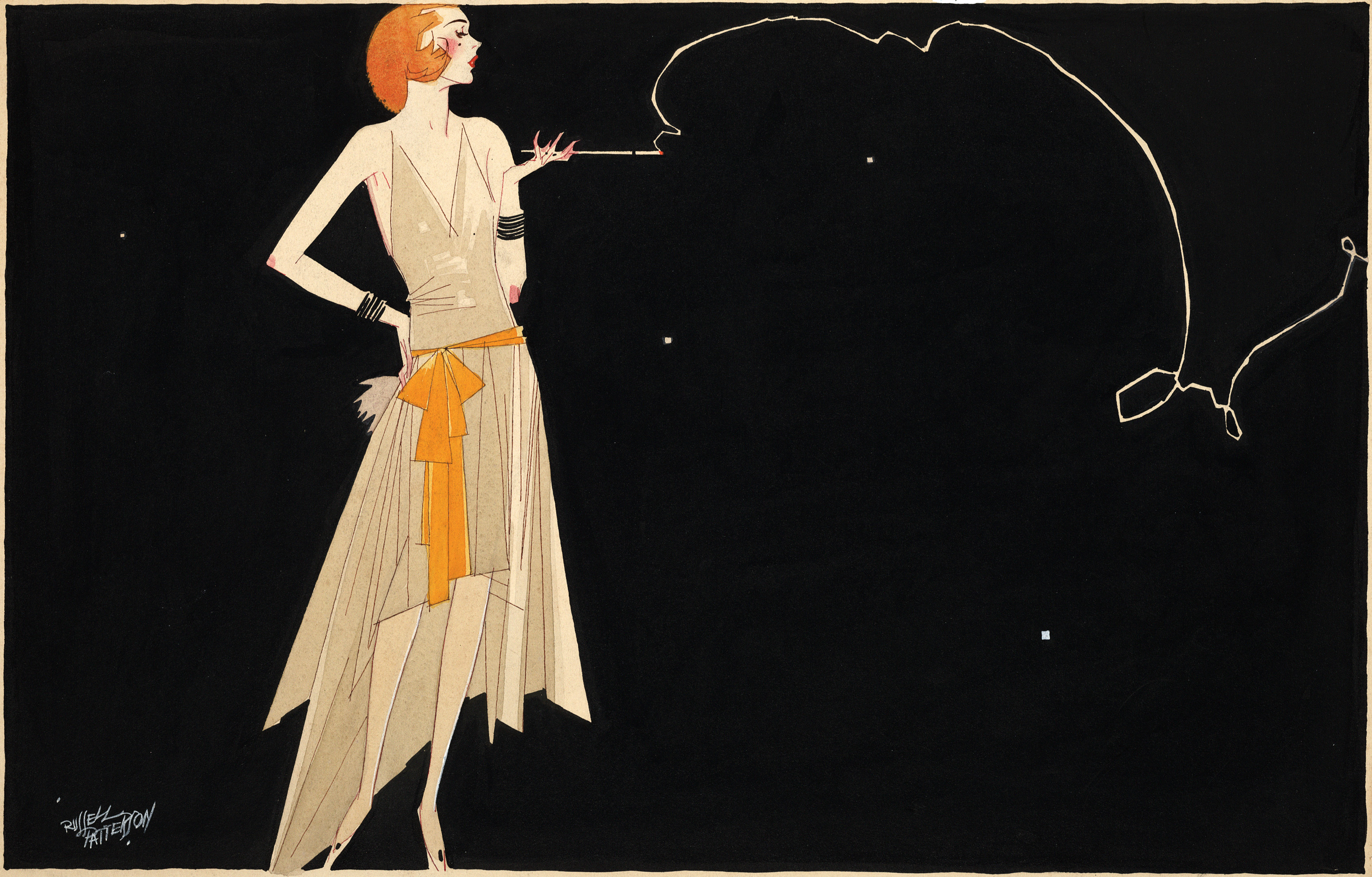
"Where there's smoke there's fire" by Russell Patterson, an example of the "girl-goddess" that influenced many artists.

Coulton Waugh gives much of the credit for the "creation of the lithe, full-breasted, long-legged American girl-goddess" to Patterson. Waugh notes Don Flowers' statement that his being an "ardent admirer" of Patterson should be readily apparent in his work. Flapper specialist Ethel Hays is also numbered among cartoonists influenced by Patterson, and E. Simms Campbell actually became a "girlie" cartoonist upon Russell Patterson's personal advice. Milton Caniff himself said that Patterson held a "king-pin place among illustrators," and also said that it was Patterson who best defined the "strut and fret" of American life between the two World Wars. Armando Mendez concludes that "it can be said with confidence that Patterson's trademark girl touched virtually every girlie comic artist working between 1930 and 1960."

A beauty expert, Patterson judged Miss America contests from 1927 to 1945 and Miss Universe pageants from 1960 through 1963. A well-known costumer and fashion designer, he contributed ideas in the early 1940s for the uniform of the fledgling Women's Army Auxiliary Corps. He served as president of the National Cartoonist Society from 1952 to 1953. Patterson received the National Cartoonists Society's Advertising and Illustration Award for 1957 and the Elzie Segar Award in 1974. His fame and reputation were such that his endorsements of Medaglia D'Oro coffee, Rheingold Beer, and Lord Calvert whiskey were trumpeted in magazine advertisements.

Russell Patterson died in Atlantic City of heart failure on March 17, 1977, as the Delaware Art Museum was preparing the first significant retrospective of his work. In 2006, Fantagraphics published Top Hats and Flappers: The Art of Russell Patterson, edited by Shane Glines and Alex Chun, with a foreword by Armando Mendez. He was honored posthumously as a Society of Illustrators 2007 Hall of Fame Inductee.
