= John Held Jr. =

American cartoonist (1889–1958)

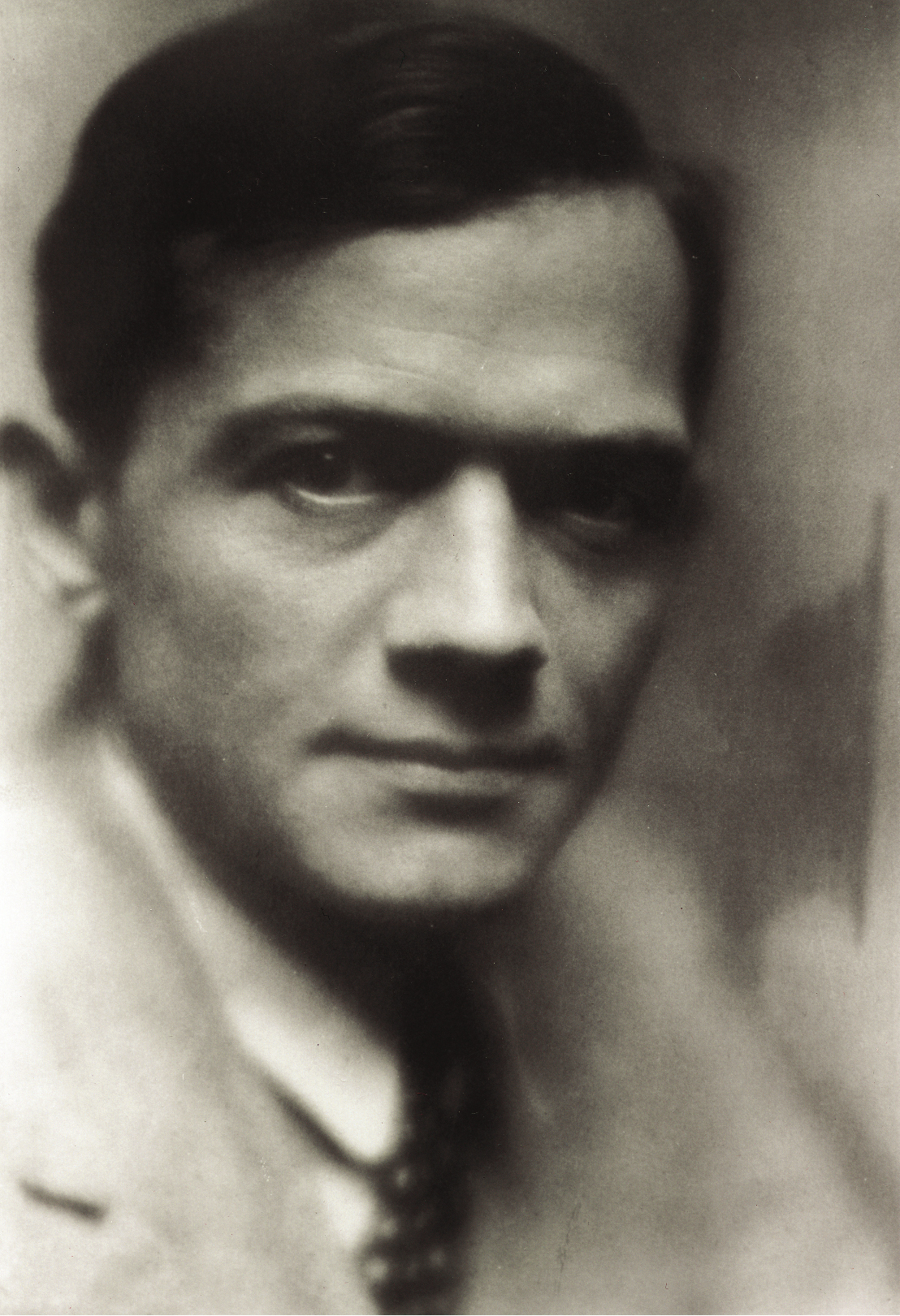
- Portrait by Pirie MacDonald (c. 1923)
- Born: January 10, 1889; Salt Lake City, Utah, U.S.
- Died: March 2, 1958 (aged 69); Belmar, New Jersey, U.S.

John James Held Jr. (January 10, 1889 – March 2, 1958) was an American cartoonist, printmaker, illustrator, sculptor, and author. One of the best-known magazine illustrators of the 1920s, his most popular works were his uniquely styled cartoons which depicted people dancing, driving, playing sports, and engaging in other popular activities of the era.

Held grew up in an artistic family that encouraged his pursuit of arts from the beginning. He began selling pieces of art by the age of nine. He never graduated from high school, finding his time was better spent honing his skills which he began at The Salt Lake Tribune as a sports illustrator during his late teenage years. His friendship with Harold Ross, creator of The New Yorker, served him well in his career, as his cartoons were featured in many prominent magazines including The New Yorker, Vanity Fair, Harper's Bazaar, and Life magazine.

Held was praised for his cartoon depictions of the cultural paradigm shift in the 1920s. The drawings depicted the flapper era in a way that both satirized and influenced the styles and mores of the time, and his images have continued to define the Jazz Age for subsequent generations.

== Youth ==
The oldest of six children, John Held Jr. was born in Salt Lake City, to Annie Evans and John Lyman Held, who met at a church social. His father was born in Geneva, Switzerland, to Jacques Held, a watchmaker, and was noticed by Mormon educator John R. Park who was scouting Europe for talented young people. He adopted Held Sr. and brought him back to Salt Lake City. He decided not to pursue a career as an educator like his mentor, but instead pursued a diverse career in copperplate engraving, manufacturing fountain pens, and operating a stationery shop. He privately developed his musical abilities on the cornet and organized Held's Band, which performed at all major Utah events for about fifty years. John Held Sr. contributed illustrations to the 1888 The Story of the Book of Mormon. Annie Evans, his mother, acted in the local theater. John Held Jr.'s maternal grandfather, James Evans, was an English convert to the Church of Jesus Christ of Latter-day Saints who traveled to Salt Lake City with the Mormon handcart pioneers.

Thriving in a home where the arts were appreciated and encouraged, Held showed a talent for the arts at a young age. He learned woodcutting and engraving from his father, and sold a drawing to a local newspaper at the age of nine. The wood block was his preferred medium in his youth and he would return to it several times throughout his career. He loved Western culture including horses, deserts, and cowboys, and this was a recurring theme in his art, both as a child and as an adult. He sold his first cartoon, a Western-themed one, to Life magazine at the age of 15.

In 1905, he began working as a sports illustrator and cartoonist at the Salt Lake City Tribune with his fellow West High School classmate Harold Ross. During his years at the Tribune, he obtained no formal art instruction claiming that his only teachers were his father and the sculptor Mahonri M. Young, a grandson of Brigham Young. In 1910 Held married Myrtle Jennings, the Tribune's society editor. In 1912 he relocated to New York, without his wife, to find a good job. While living in a flat with Hal Burrows and Mahonri Young, he drew posters for Collier's Street Railway Advertising Company and ads for Wanamaker's Department Store, and designed costumes and sets for the theater to make ends meet. In 1914, he returned to his linoleum block print style.

== Cartoons and covers ==
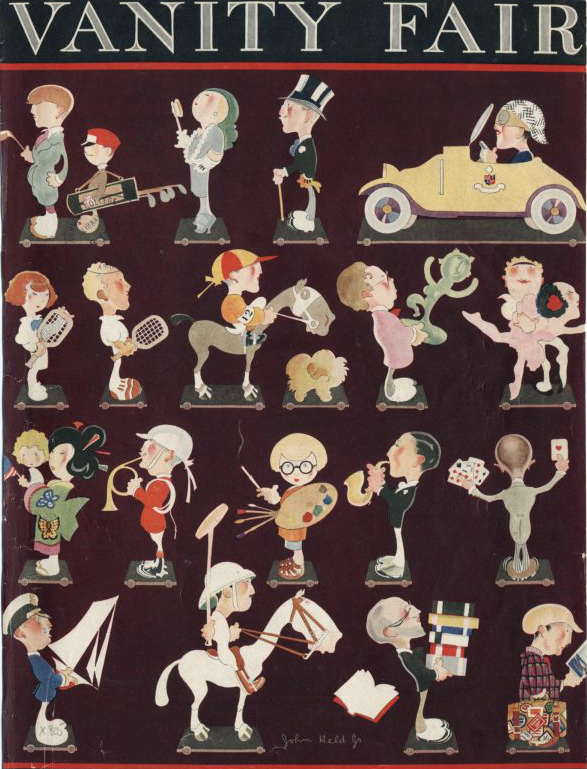
John Held, Jr. cover for Vanity Fair (April 1921)

In 1915 Vanity Fair began publishing his drawings, for which he used the pseudonym "Myrtle Held", because he was too shy to use his own name. He also began doing woodcuts for his "Frankie and Johnny" series, which would be published in limited quantity in 1930 and greater quantity in 1971.

During World War I, Held worked for US Naval Intelligence in Central America as an artist and cartographer. During this commission, he participated in an expedition co-sponsored by the American Museum of Natural History and the Carnegie Foundation with archaeologists Sylanus Morley and Herbert Spinden. His duties were to look for German submarine activity off-shore, make coastal maps, sketch any signs of military operation, and record the Mayan hieroglyphics and sketch any finds in the expedition. His friend and roommate Marc Connelly, a famous American playwright, later wrote of Held's distinct humor, recounting that he teased friend Ernest Haskell for wearing a terrible homemade camouflage costume by crying out, "My God! Where's Ernie?"

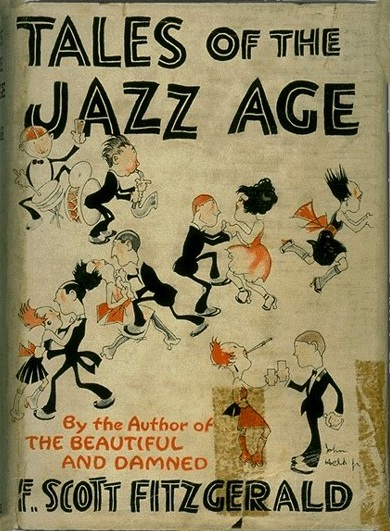
John Held, Jr.'s 1922 cover for an F. Scott Fitzgerald collection

In 1925, his old high school friend Harold Ross started The New Yorker. By 1927, Held's work had appeared in Life, Vanity Fair, Harper's Bazaar, and The New Yorker, and he had also contributed illustrations for other influential magazines, including Judge and The Smart Set. His work, which quickly became popular, defined the "funny, stylish image of the flapper with her cigarette holder, shingle bob and turned-down hose and of her slick-haired boyfriend in puffy pants and raccoon coat," whom he named Betty Co-ed and Joe College; the perfect archetypes for the generation. According to Held, he didn't really intend to create the flapper ideal; he just drew what was around him, and it became popular so he kept drawing. He was reportedly becoming so popular that people were sending him blank checks, offering anything for an original piece. From a 1957 interview with the New York Post, an editor explained that Held was seen as a man who could pull a magazine out of trouble, which made his cartoons valuable and coveted.

He wrote and drew two newspaper comic strips, Oh! Margy and its sequel Merely Margy and Rah Rah Rosalie. After F. Scott Fitzgerald complained that William Hill designed the characters on his covers to look too much like himself and his wife Zelda, Fitzgerald hired Held to illustrate his book covers, after taking a liking to his cartoon style. This represented the stylistic shift of the period from realism to abstraction which influenced the Art-Deco style of the decade. Held's first cover for Fitzgerald was a companion book of short stories for The Beautiful and Damned, and he subsequently illustrated Tales of the Jazz Age (1922) and The Vegetable (1923). Held also designed the cover for Pulitzer Prize-winning novel, So Big.

In addition to his archetypical flapper illustrations, Held also made linocuts and drew cartoons in a 19th-century woodcut style, as he had started getting bored with the flapper girls. During this time period, his art often depicted the "Gay Nineties". From 1925 to 1932, his woodcut-style cartoons and faux maps were published frequently in The New Yorker. Held Jr slipped occasional imagery alluding to the Church of Jesus Christ of Latter-day Saints such as temples, the acronym ZCMI, the Angel Moroni, and Brigham Young, and though some people believe he sneaked them in, Ross was fully aware of it and actually encouraged it. Held portrayed a satirical view of the Roaring Twenties, often criticizing the drinking, gambling, and rampant sexuality that often characterized the decade. This contrasted his counterparts in Jazz-Age cartoons such as Peter Arno who seemed to celebrate it. Held also created the iconic "Wise Men Fish Here" sign which hung above the door of the Gotham Book Mart for the life of the store.

During the Great Depression Held lost much of his money in the Ivar Kreuger fraud scheme. His last New Yorker illustration appeared in 1932. Held wrote and illustrated several novels, such as Grim Youth (1930) and The Flesh Is Weak (1931). The reduced demand for his cartoons in the 1930s gave him more time to paint. During this time, he painted somber landscapes and cityscapes, while also illustrating children's books and animal fantasies. He loved animals and depicted them frequently, but rarely used them for satire, because he found humans more strange and amusing. He also published The Works of John Held Jr. in 1931.

In 1937, he designed sets for the Broadway comedy revue Hellzapoppin, and produced the Tops Variety Show which showcased young talent. He exhibited his bronze sculptures of horses in New York in 1939 at Bland Gallery. He was named artist-in residence at Harvard and the University of Georgia by the Carnegie Corporation where he taught students and focused on sculpting. He moved to a dairy farm in Wall, New Jersey in 1943 working as a free-lance artist and illustrating children's books, after serving with his wife in the area during World War II in the U.S. Army Signal Corps, painting pictures of radar apparatus. In the 1950s, popular nostalgia for the 1920s resulted in a revival of interest in Held's earlier works, as the first edition of Playboy featured a reprint of Held's "Frankie and Johnny" cartoons.

== Style ==
Held was unorthodox among the artists of the decade, as he was uninterested in copying European art and made his own way stylistically. Pointillism was the only exception as he occasionally painted in this style up until 1931, taking inspiration from Georges Seurat. He claimed to be influenced by the Ashcan School early on in his career. Held admired the caricatural quality of Greek vase painting. He was also inspired by the Mayan geometric designs he saw during his time in Central America in 1917, using them as elements of his art rather than the foundation of it.

The angular style of Held's drawings depicting the Roaring Twenties has sometimes been incorrectly defined as Art Deco, according to art historian Carl Weidhardt. His classic style is represented by the exaggeratedly tall and skinny, yet anatomically correct flapper women that made him famous, shown in minimal detail with a high influence of angle and diagonal lines and a comedic use of color. In the midst of his long career, he began to loathe the characters he created, but looking back towards the end of his life, he was amazed by the uproar and social criticism that those women evoked. Having stated that he wasn't sure whether religion created his interest in geography or vice versa, he was also known for his satirical cartography, which contained cartoons and purposefully unrealistic geographical proportions.

Throughout his career, Held used woodblock, linocut, bronze, pen, and paint and he painted everything from maps to cartoons, to scenery and accurate animal portraits. Even though his art was so varied in style, there was unity in effect.

Corey Ford described Held as both the recorder and the setter of popular styles and manners of the Jazz Age:

His angular and scantily clad flapper was accepted by scandalized elders as the prototype of modern youth, the symbol of our moral revolution ... Week after week in Life and Judge and College Humor, they danced the Charleston with ropes of beads swinging and bracelets clanking and legs kicking at right angles ... So sedulously did we ape his caricatures that they lost their satiric point and came to be a documentary record of our time.

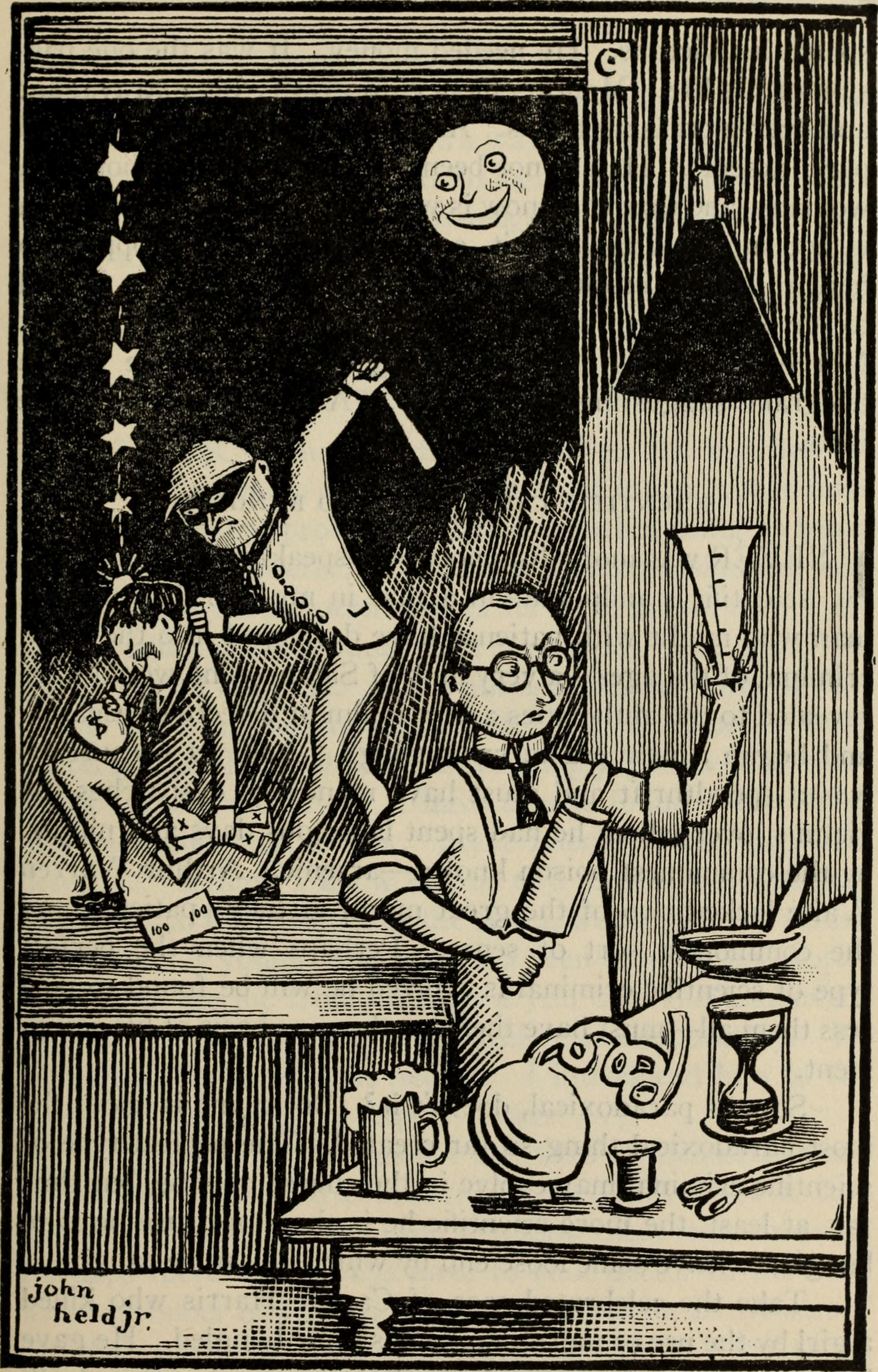
Held's illustration for "When the Criminal Takes to Science", The Forum (July 1919)

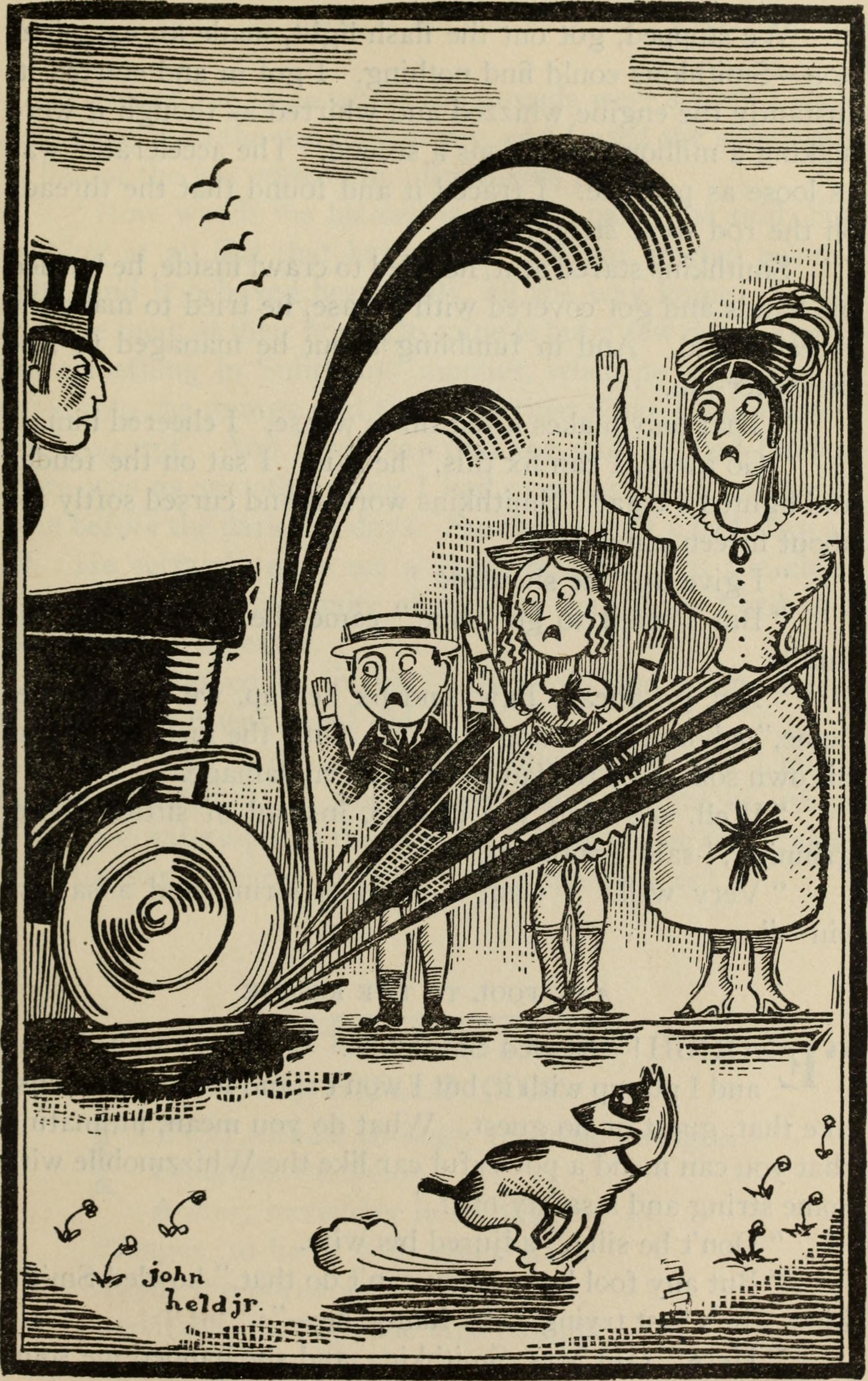
Held's illustration for "Any Fool Could Do It!", The Forum (September 1919)

== Personal life ==
Held made an enormous fortune in the 1920s and became a part of the high-society life that he depicted in his art.

Held was married four times. He married Myrtle Jennings in 1910. After a divorce, he married Ada Johnson in 1918. During the 1920s the couple adopted three children. He served as constable of Weston, Connecticut, and ran for Congress as a Democrat. The campaign was unsuccessful, much to his relief, because he never left his house nor gave a speech.

After the stock market crash, he suffered a nervous breakdown, selling his home in Connecticut, which led to his divorce from his second wife. In 1932, Held married Miss New Orleans Gladys Moore, and had a daughter named Judy. In 1942, he married Margaret Schuyler James, with whom he had a happy marriage. He spent the last years of his life on Old Schuyler Farm in Belmar, New Jersey, with animals and a new family. He died at his home in 1958, aged 69, from throat cancer.

John Held Jr. is interred in Woodlawn Cemetery in The Bronx, New York City.

== Legacy ==
In 1927, Held was nominated for the Vanity Fair Hall of Fame: "Because as a caricaturist, he invented the modern flapper; because last year he was almost elected a member of Congress from Connecticut; because he is a syndicated artist who has not lost his flair for drawing and satire; because he is a born comedian." Even after his death he has been the subject of many galleries and exhibitions. In 1967, his work was showcased from October to November at the Art Association of Indianapolis in an exhibition titled, "John Held, Jr.". The next year, from November to December, the Rhode Island School of Design presented "The Jazz Age", featuring Held and two other artists. The Smithsonian Institution featured a nationwide traveling exhibition from 1969 to 1972 called "The Art of John Held, Jr."
