= List of fictional salespeople =

This is a list of notable salespeople in fictional contexts.

== A ==
- Harry "Rabbit" Angstrom, in the John Updike novels Rabbit, Run and sequels.

== B ==
- George Babbitt, in the Sinclair Lewis novel Babbitt.
- Andy Bernard, on the television series, The Office.
- Rodney Blackstock, on the soap opera, Emmerdale.
- Theofiel Boemerang, vacuum cleaner salesman from Willy Vandersteen's comic Suske en Wiske.
- Al Bundy, shoe salesman on the U.S. television series Married... with Children.

== C ==
- Tim Canterbury, on the television series, The Office.
- John Casey, on the television series, Chuck.
- Comic Book Guy, comic book salesman from The Simpsons.
- Brett Craig, on the television series, Kath & Kim.

== D ==
- Larry Dallas, used car salesman on the sitcom Three's Company.
- C.M.O.T. Dibbler, in Terry Pratchett's Discworld series.
- Santo DiMera, in the soap opera Days of Our Lives.
- Terry Duckworth, in the soap opera Coronation Street.

== E ==
- Montague Egg, wine salesman, in short stories by Dorothy L. Sayers.

== F ==
- Oliveira da Figueira, Portuguese salesman, from Hergé's comic The Adventures of Tintin.
- Ned Flanders, owner of a store with items for left-handed people, from The Simpsons.

== G ==
- Garmt Grootgrut, a grocer from the Dutch comic series Tom Poes by Marten Toonder.
- Gil Gunderson, unsuccessful salesman from The Simpsons.

== H ==
- Jim Halpert, paper salesman in The Office.
- Hank Hill, from the TV series King of the Hill.
- Harold Hill, from the musical and film The Music Man.
- Audrey Horne, from the TV series Twin Peaks.

== K ==
- Gareth Keenan, paper salesman in British television series The Office.
- Malcolm Kennedy, salesman from the soap opera Neighbours.

== L ==
- Daniel LaRusso, car salesman in The Karate Kid and Cobra Kai.
- Leisure Suit Larry, eponymous video game character.
- Willy Loman, the salesman from Arthur Miller's play Death of a Salesman.

== M ==
- José María "Chema" Martínez, owner of a market store from Aída.
- Darren Miller, on the soap opera EastEnders.

== N ==
- Apu Nahasapeemapetilon, Indian supermarket owner from The Simpsons.

== R ==
- Luthen Rael, antiques dealer and Axis network spymaster operating out of a shop on Coruscant from the Star Wars television series Andor.

== S ==
- Gregor Samsa, from Franz Kafka's novel The Metamorphosis.
- Dwight Schrute, owner of a paper distribution company from the TV series The Office.
- Spamton G. Spamton, failed salesman in the video game Deltarune.
- Jan Spier, a French fries salesman from Marc Sleen's comic The Adventures of Nero.

== T ==
- Wash Tubbs, store owner from Roy Crane's store Wash Tubbs.

== U ==
- Unhygienix, the fishmonger in Astérix' village, from René Goscinny and Albert Uderzo's comic series Astérix.

== W ==
- Jolyon Wagg, annoying insurance salesman in The Adventures of Tintin.
- Watto, shopkeeper from the Star Wars film The Phantom Menace.
- Ash Williams, in the franchise The Evil Dead.
- Derek Wilton, on the soap opera Coronation Street.
