= Ann Turner Cook =

American Baby Food Icon (1926–2022)

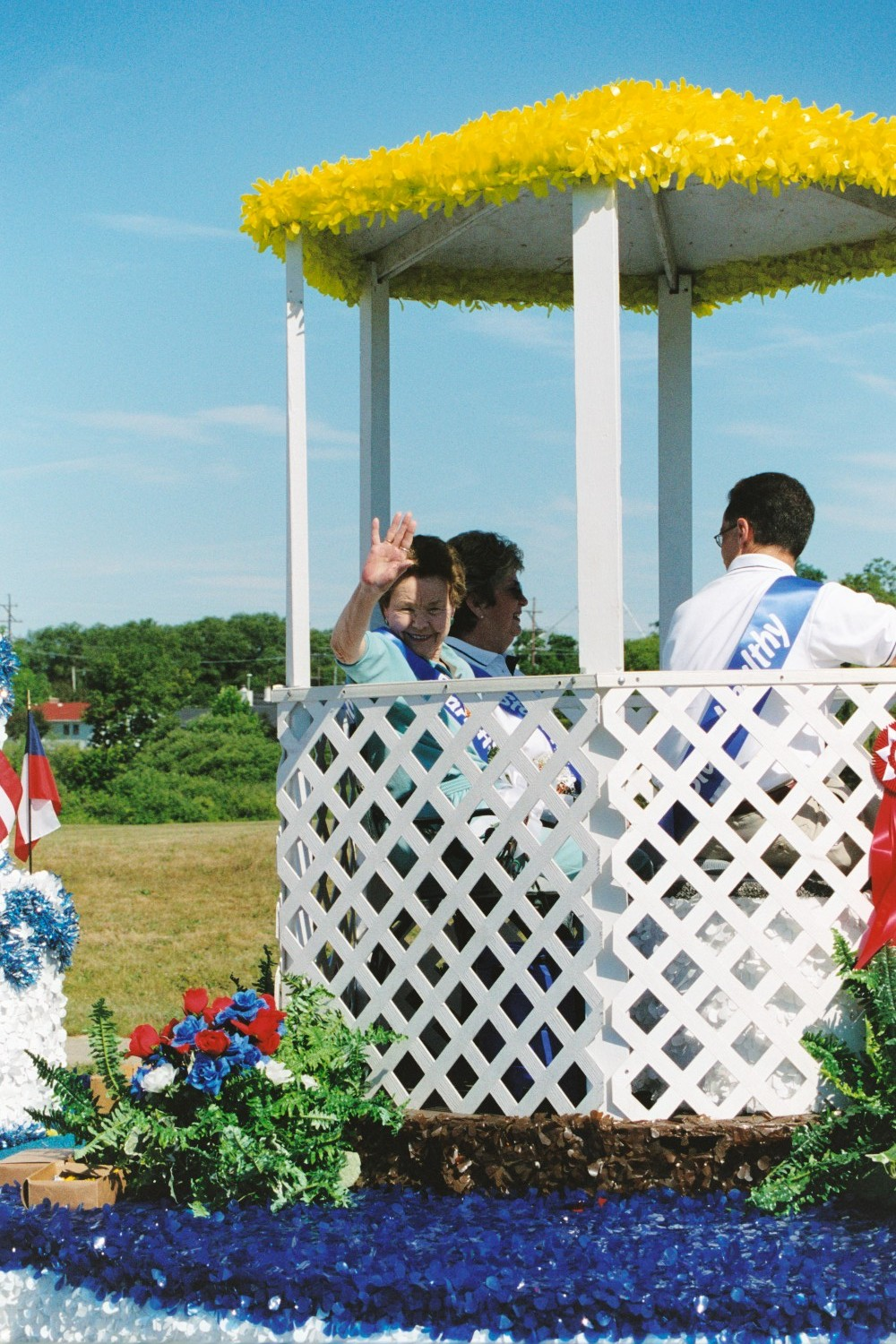
- Ann Turner Cook seen at the National Baby Food Festival parade in Fremont, Michigan, in 2003
- Born: Ann Leslie Turner; November 20, 1926; Westport, Connecticut, U.S.
- Died: June 3, 2022 (aged 95); St. Petersburg, Florida, U.S.
- Burial place: Florida National Cemetery
- Education: Southern Methodist University (BA); University of South Florida (MA)
- Occupations: Educator; novelist
- Known for: Gerber Baby
- Spouse: James Cook (died 2004)
- Children: 4
- Father: Leslie Turner

Ann Turner Cook (born Ann Leslie Turner; November 20, 1926 – June 3, 2022) was an American educator and mystery novelist who was best known as the model for the familiar Gerber Baby artwork, seen on baby food packages of the Gerber Products Company.

== Early life and Gerber Baby history ==
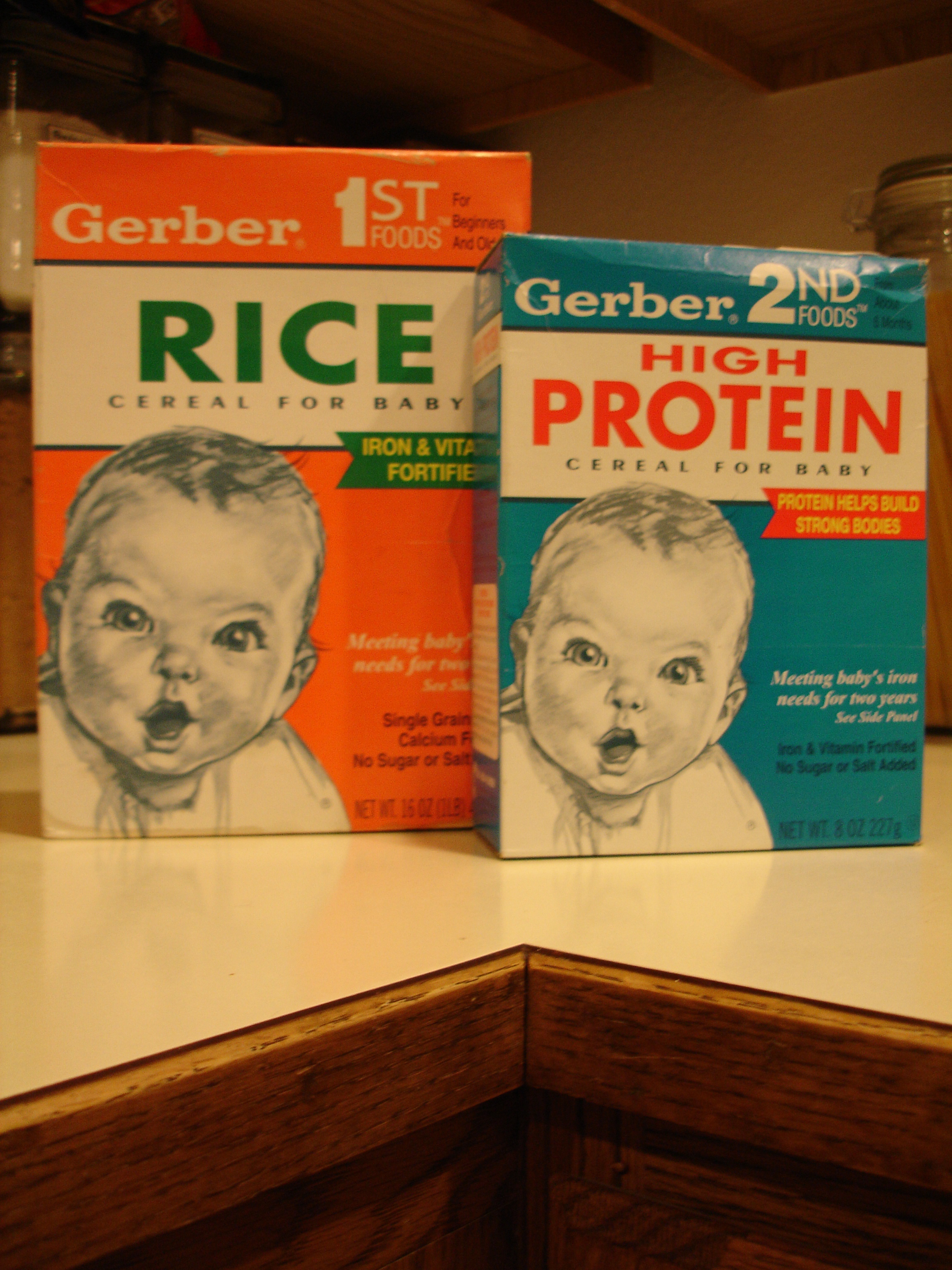
Examples of the Gerber Baby Artwork

Born in Westport, Connecticut, she was the daughter of Bethel (Burson) and syndicated cartoonist Leslie Turner, who drew the comic strip Captain Easy for decades. The family's neighbor was the artist Dorothy Hope Smith, who did a charcoal drawing of Ann when she was a baby. In 1928, when Gerber announced it was looking for baby images for its upcoming line of baby food, Smith's drawing was submitted and subsequently chosen. It was trademarked in 1931. The drawing of Ann Turner Cook has since been used on virtually all Gerber baby food packaging. Cook's identity was a secret until 1978. In 1990, Cook appeared as a guest on To Tell the Truth in a one-on-one segment.

Her family moved to Orlando, Florida, later in her childhood. She received a bachelor's degree in English from Southern Methodist University and a master's degree in English education from the University of South Florida. She was a sister in the sorority Pi Beta Phi.

== Career ==
Cook taught at Oak Hill elementary school in Florida, and then at Madison Junior High School, in Tampa, Florida. In 1966, she joined the English Department of Tampa's Hillsborough High School, where she eventually rose to being the school's department chairwoman. Students there dedicated the 1972 Hilsborean school yearbook to Cook, who sponsored the book. In it, students described her as "a teacher who really communicates with the students" and who, "without any complaints ... has stayed late, worked nights, and with quiet efficiency supported her staff in their monumental task".

After retiring from teaching, Cook became a novelist. A member of the Mystery Writers of America, she was the author of the Brandy O'Bannon series of mystery novels set on Florida's Gulf Coast. The adventures of Florida reporter and amateur sleuth O'Bannon are detailed in Trace Their Shadows (2001) and Shadow over Cedar Key (2003). The latter title received a negative review from Publishers Weekly, which stated the book had “An overly busy plot ... [and] is weighed down with limp prose and repetition.”

== Personal life and death ==
She was married to James Cook, a criminologist with the Hillsborough County Sheriff's Office, until his death in 2004. They had four children.

Cook died of natural causes at her home in St. Petersburg, Florida, on June 3, 2022, at the age of 95.
