= Leslie Turner =

American cartoonist and writer (1899–1988)

- Born: December 25, 1899 Cisco, Texas, U.S.
- Died: March 2, 1988 (aged 88) Orlando, Florida, U.S.
- Area: Cartoonist
- Notable works: Captain Easy

Leslie Turner (December 25, 1899 – March 2, 1988) was an American cartoonist and writer who produced Captain Easy for more than three decades.

== Biography ==
=== Early life and education ===
Born in Cisco, Texas, Turner grew up from age eight in Wichita Falls, Texas, where he started drawing while in high school. His grandfather was the courthouse architect and builder A. C. Swinburne, responsible for numerous courthouses across West Texas.

After serving briefly in the U.S. Army near the end of World War I, Turner began profiting from his art talent while a freshman at Southern Methodist University. He dropped out of college for one term to attend the Chicago Academy of Fine Arts. While a student at SMU, Turner and his college pals would make vagabond treks around the United States during the summer months. He edited SMU's 1922 yearbook, and after his graduation that same year with an English degree, he worked at a Dallas engraving plant.

=== Newlyweds in New York ===
While freelancing from Dallas, he sold a cartoon to Judge. He then married Bethel Burson of Silverton, Texas, and the newlyweds headed for New York where he became a freelance illustrator with work published in a variety of magazines, including Redbook, Pictorial Review, Ladies' Home Journal and Boys' Life. It took him two years to crack the major market, The Saturday Evening Post, work that included illustrating the popular "Plupy" stories of Henry Shute.

Jim Ivey, curator of the Cartoon Museum in Orlando, Florida, stated, "He was one of the best magazine illustrators in the 1920s and 1930s—the Golden Age of magazine illustrating. He was a superb artist." After six years in New York, the couple and their two daughters moved in 1929 to Colorado where they ran a small sheep ranch while living in a two-story stone house constructed by Turner. Unfortunately, the freelance assignments from New York soon slowed, but their Colorado claim required them to spend three years on the ranch. After four years in Colorado, they returned to New York, where Turner found work doing advertising illustrations.

=== Comic strips ===
A friend of fellow Texan Roy Crane, Turner began in comics in 1937 as an assistant on Crane's Wash Tubbs strip. Crane recalled their youthful adventures:

Les Turner, who later was my assistant on the Wash Tubbs daily strips, is from Wichita Falls. We were going on a sort of bumming trip together after we finished art school. There were no jobs for us, and we went riding freight trains and hitching rides. I missed him by one day when he got a ride to California. I went to Galveston and got a job as ordinary seaman on a tramp steamer to Europe. When we returned and landed at New York, I got my first art job on the New York World. I started Wash Tubbs in 1924.

When Crane moved to Orlando, the Turner family followed in 1938, living at 1218 Conway Road, where Turner designed and built all the furniture in the house.

=== Turner takes over ===
Leslie Turner's Captain Easy (April 12, 1953)

In 1943, when Crane left to do Buz Sawyer, Turner took over the daily Wash Tubbs, and his signature first appeared on the strip May 31, 1943. In January 1944, Turner made comic strip history when he observed a fighter plane flying over his home in Orlando. He drew it into Wash Tubbs, surprising the War Department. The aircraft was the Northrop P-61 Black Widow, and Turner's drawing of it appeared two days before the Army's official announcement.

In the late 1940s, Turner changed the title to Captain Easy, taking on Walt Scott (1894–1970) as a Sunday page assistant during the 1940s and 1950s. At its peak, the strip was carried in 600 newspapers. It was noted for its scientific accuracy, and the Captain explained the binary system to readers when computers were in their infancy. In 1949, Turner did extensive research into alcoholism in order to write a strip sequence on the rehabilitation of drunkard Gig Wilty. The story arc brought Turner praise from many members of Alcoholics Anonymous. Ten years later, he researched hypnotism for a sequence timed to coincide with publicity for the movie The Hypnotic Eye (1960).

The Sunday strip was drawn by Mel Graff during the 1960s. In late 1969–70, Turner's assistant Bill Crooks took over the art and Jim Lawrence scripted. At the time of Turner's death in Orlando in 1988, Crooks commented, "Everything I learned about the comic strip business I learned from him."

Turner had three daughters, Ann, Joy and Toby. Ann Turner Cook found fame as the model for the Gerber Baby, trademarked art reproduced from a 1928 charcoal sketch by the Turner family's neighbor, artist Dorothy Hope Smith. Cook, who taught literature and creative writing in Tampa, Florida for 26 years, wrote the Brandy O'Bannon mystery novels, including Trace Their Shadows and Shadow over Cedar Key, set on Florida's Gulf Coast.

== Awards ==
In 1965, Turner was honored by 60 Florida cartoonists during their annual Daytona Beach gathering with a plaque presented by cartoonist Dick Hodkins, regional chairman of the National Cartoonists Society.
