= Dragon Lady (disambiguation) =

Dragon Lady is a stereotype of certain East Asian and occasionally South Asian or Southeast Asian women as strong, deceitful, domineering, mysterious, and often sexually alluring.

Dragon Lady may also refer to:

== People ==
- Empress Dowager Cixi (1835–1908), Dowager empress of the late Qing dynasty
- Soong Mei-ling (1898–2003), First Lady of the Republic of China
- Devika Rani (1908–1994), Indian actress
- Madame Nhu (1924–2011), First Lady of South Vietnam
- Sante Kimes (1934–2014), American murderer, con artist, robber, fraudster

== Arts, entertainment and media ==
- Dragon Lady (Terry and the Pirates), a character in the comic strip Terry and the Pirates
- Dragon Lady (TV series), a 2019 Philippine television drama fantasy series broadcast by GMA Network
- Dragon Ladies: Asian American Feminists Breathe Fire, a 1997 book by Sonia Shah
- The G.I. Executioner, a 1975 American action film

== Business ==
- Dragon Lady Comics, a Canadian comic book shop
- Dragon Lady Press, a Canadian comic book publishing company

== Other uses ==
- Lockheed U-2, an American reconnaissance aircraft

== See also ==
- Lady Dragon, a 1990 American martial arts film
