= Florida National Cemetery =

Veterans cemetery in Sumter County, Florida

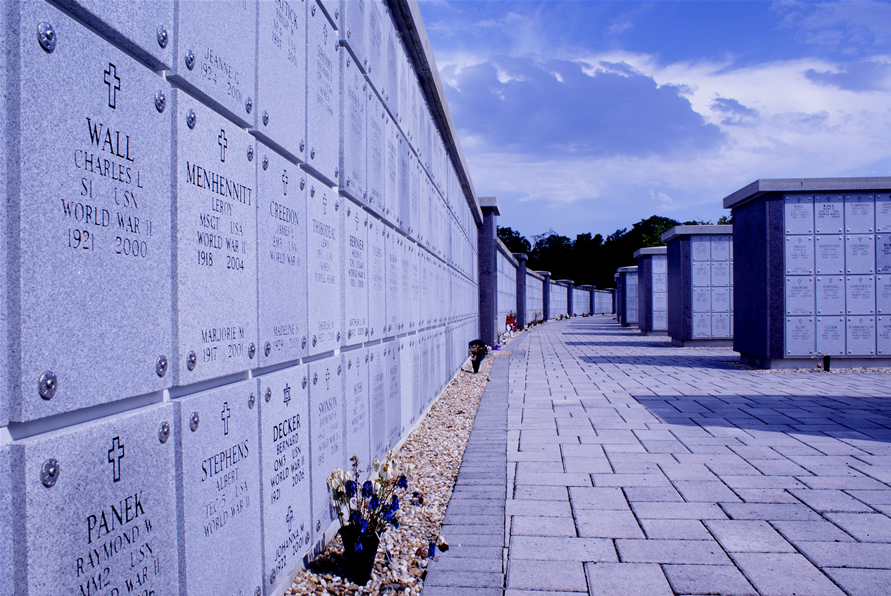
- Columbarium at Florida National Cemetery.
- Interactive map of Florida National Cemetery

Details
- Established: 1988
- Location: Bushnell, Florida
- Country: United States
- Coordinates: 28°36′21″N 82°12′36″W
- Type: United States National Cemetery
- Size: 512.9 acres (207.6 ha)
- No. of interments: 180,000
- Website: Official
- Find a Grave: Florida National Cemetery

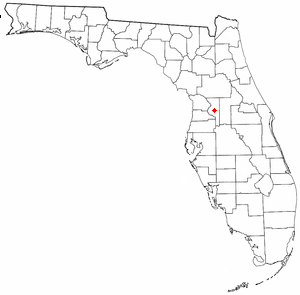
Location of cemetery in Florida

Florida National Cemetery is a United States National Cemetery, near the city of Bushnell, in Sumter County, Florida. Administered by the United States Department of Veterans Affairs, it encompasses 512.9 acres (207.6 ha). It began interments in 1988, and has become one of the busiest cemeteries in the United States.

== History ==
Florida National Cemetery is in the Withlacoochee State Forest, about 50 miles (80 km) north of Tampa. The forest was acquired by the federal government from private landowners between 1936 and 1939 under the provisions of the U.S. Land Resettlement Administration. The United States Forest Service managed the property until a lease-purchase agreement transferred it to the Florida Board of Forestry in 1958. Currently, Withlacoochee State Forest is the second largest state forest in Florida, divided into eight distinct tracts of land.

In 1842, Congress encouraged settlement here by establishing the Armed Occupation Act. The law granted a patent for 160 acres (0.65 km^{2}) to any white man who kept a gun and ammunition, built a house, cultivated 5 acres (20,000 m^{2}) of the land, and remained there for at least five years. Settlers moved in to take advantage of the generous offer. The area contained abundant timber and suitable farmland, appealing attributes to frontiersmen. In 1845 Florida was granted statehood.

During the Civil War, a sugar mill on the Homosassa River supplied sugar to the Confederacy. A robust citrus-growing industry developed in the eastern part of the area and became a focus of intense economic expansion soon after the war.

In 1980, the Department of Veterans Affairs (VA) announced that it would establish a new national cemetery in Florida, its fourth. Two major locations for the cemetery were studied: property near the Cross Florida Barge Canal and the Withlacoochee State Forest. The Withlacoochee site, though more environmentally sensitive, was supported by government officials. In February 1983, the state transferred land to the VA for the development of a Florida National Cemetery. The first burial was in 1988 and a columbarium was opened in November 2001.

In 1999, federal officials asked the Florida Cabinet to grant land for the expansion of the Florida National Cemetery, providing 65,000 to 100,000 grave sites for veterans in the state. Environmentalists argued that Florida Department of Agriculture and Consumer Services Forestry Division officials did not state whether the 179 acres of land within the Withlacoochee State Forest was surplus in accordance to a Florida constitutional amendment concerning the acquisition of land for conservation.

Before the Florida Cabinet meeting on October 26, the Department Veterans Affairs and the Florida Cabinet agreed that 42 acres would be removed from the proposed expanded site, as they served as habitat for several endangered species. Florida governor Jeb Bush and the Florida Cabinet then voted 7–0 in favor of selling the remaining 137 acres of land to the Department of Veterans Affairs for the cemetery's expansion.

== Notable interments ==
- Medal of Honor recipients
  - Master Chief Hospital Corpsman William R. Charette (1932–2012), U.S. Navy, for action with the Marine Corps in the Korean War. Charette also was the individual who selected the Unknown Soldier representing World War II in a ceremony aboard the USS Canberra.
  - Duane E. Dewey, U.S. Marine Corps, for actions with the 1st Marine Division during the Korean War.
  - Master Sergeant James R. Hendrix (1925–2002), U.S. Army, for action with the 4th Armored Division at the Battle of the Bulge in World War II.
  - Sergeant Major Franklin D. Miller (1945–2000), U.S. Army Special Forces, for action in the Vietnam War.
- Others
  - Frank Baker (1944–2010), professional baseball player
  - Mel Brandt (1919-2008), TV announcer and actor, World War II veteran
  - Philip J. Corso (1915–1998), U.S. Army Lt. Colonel & ufologist
  - Raymond Fernandez, aka "Hercules Hernandez" (1956–2004), professional wrestler.
  - Scott Helvenston (1965–2004), film trainer-stuntman and former Navy SEAL
  - Lt. Commander Mike Holovak (1919–2008), U.S. Navy, skipper of PT boat in the South Pacific credited with sinking nine Japanese ships in World War II.
  - Hal Jeffcoat (1924–2007), Major League Baseball pitcher and outfielder
  - Major David Moniac (1802–1836), veteran of the Second Seminole War, first Native American graduate of United States Military Academy.
  - Blackjack Mulligan (1941–2016), professional wrestler, author and football player
  - Ernie Oravetz (1932–2006), Major League Baseball outfielder
  - Colonel Leonard T. Schroeder (1918–2009), the first soldier ashore in the Normandy Landings on D-Day, June 6, 1944, during World War II.
  - Frank Stanley (1922–1999), cinematographer for Clint Eastwood films such as Breezy, Magnum Force, Thunderbolt and Lightfoot and The Eiger Sanction
  - Champ Summers (1946–2012), Major League Baseball outfielder
  - Ann Turner Cook (1926-2022), Original Model of the Gerber Baby Logo

== Notable monuments ==
A carillon was constructed by the World War II AMVETS organization in an open area adjacent to the first administration building. It was dedicated on October 9, 1993. The cemetery contains a Memorial Pathway that in 2003 featured 47 plaques, statues, monuments, etc., honoring America's soldiers from 20th-century conflicts.

On October 6, 2021 a Gold Star Families Memorial Monument from the Woody Williams Foundation was Dedicated in the cemetery's area known as Freedom Memorial Plaza.
