= Edwin Granberry =

American novelist

- Born: April 18, 1897; Meridian, Mississippi
- Died: December 5, 1988 (aged 91)
- Occupations: Writer; Novelist; Translator
- Children: Julian Granberry

Edwin Phillips Granberry (April 18, 1897 – December 5, 1988) was an American writer, novelist and translator. In 1932, he won the O. Henry Award for Best Short Short Story.

Edwin Granberry was born in Meridian, Mississippi, and went to Starkville High School in Starkville, Mississippi. He was educated at the University of Florida (from 1916 to 1918), at Columbia University (in 1920) and at Harvard University (from 1922 to 1924).

== New York Sun ==
Granberry became an English professor at Rollins College in 1933. Granberry was a reviewer (for The New York Sun) of Margaret Mitchell's Gone with the Wind, which he compared favorably to War and Peace by Leo Tolstoy. Later, Granberry and his wife, Mabel, became friends with Mitchell.

== Buz Sawyer ==
Today, Granberry is best known for his 30-year run as a writer on the Roy Crane comic strip Buz Sawyer, which he continued scripting after Crane's death in 1977.

== Television ==
In 1955, Granberry was a scripter for the anthology drama television series Star Tonight.

== Novels ==
- The Ancient Hunger (Macaulay, 1927)
- The Erl King (Macaulay, 1930)
- Strangers and Lovers (Signet, 1951)
- A Trip to Czardis (Trident, 1966)

== Awards ==
In 1932, Granberry won the O. Henry Award for Best Short Short Story, "A Trip to Czardis", which he later expanded into a novel and an unproduced screenplay.
