= Dragon Lady Press =

Defunct Canadian comic book publisher

- Parent company: Dragon Lady Comics
- Status: Defunct, 1988
- Founded: 1985
- Founder: John Biernat
- Country of origin: Canada
- Headquarters location: Toronto, Ontario
- Publication types: Comics
- Fiction genres: Golden Age of Comic Books

Dragon Lady Press was the publishing wing of the Toronto-based comic book store Dragon Lady Comics, operating from 1985 to 1988. The company was known for its reprints of classic newspaper comic strips in various forms. Its publications were distributed through the direct market throughout the United States and Canada.

== Titles published ==
- Alley Oop Quarterly, 3 issues (Nov. 1987–Jan. 1988)
- The Best of the Tribune Co., 4 issues (Sept. 1985–Apr. 1986) — continues in Thrilling Adventure Strips
- Bravo for Adventure (Alex Toth), 1 issue (Jan. 1987)
- Buz Sawyer Quarterly, 3 issues (Nov. 1986–Apr. 1987)
- Classic Adventure Strips, 16 issues (Jan. 1985–Aug. 1987)
- The Complete Max Collins/Rick Fletcher Dick Tracy, 3 issues (June 1986–Aug. 1987)
- Dragon Lady Press Presents, 16 issues (Jan. 1986–Jan. 1988)
- Dragon Lady Productions, 2 issues ([Aug.] 1985–[Oct.] 1985)
- Johnny Hazard Quarterly, 10 issues (Aug. 1986-Aug. 1987)
- Red Ryder
- Science Fiction Classics, 1 issue (Nov. 1987)
- Thrilling Adventure Strips, 16 issues (June 1986–Apr. 1987) — continues from The Best of the Tribune Co.
- Wash Tubbs Quarterly, 7 issues (Oct. 1986 - Nov. 1987)
