= Julian Granberry =

American anthropologist, ghost hunter, and writer

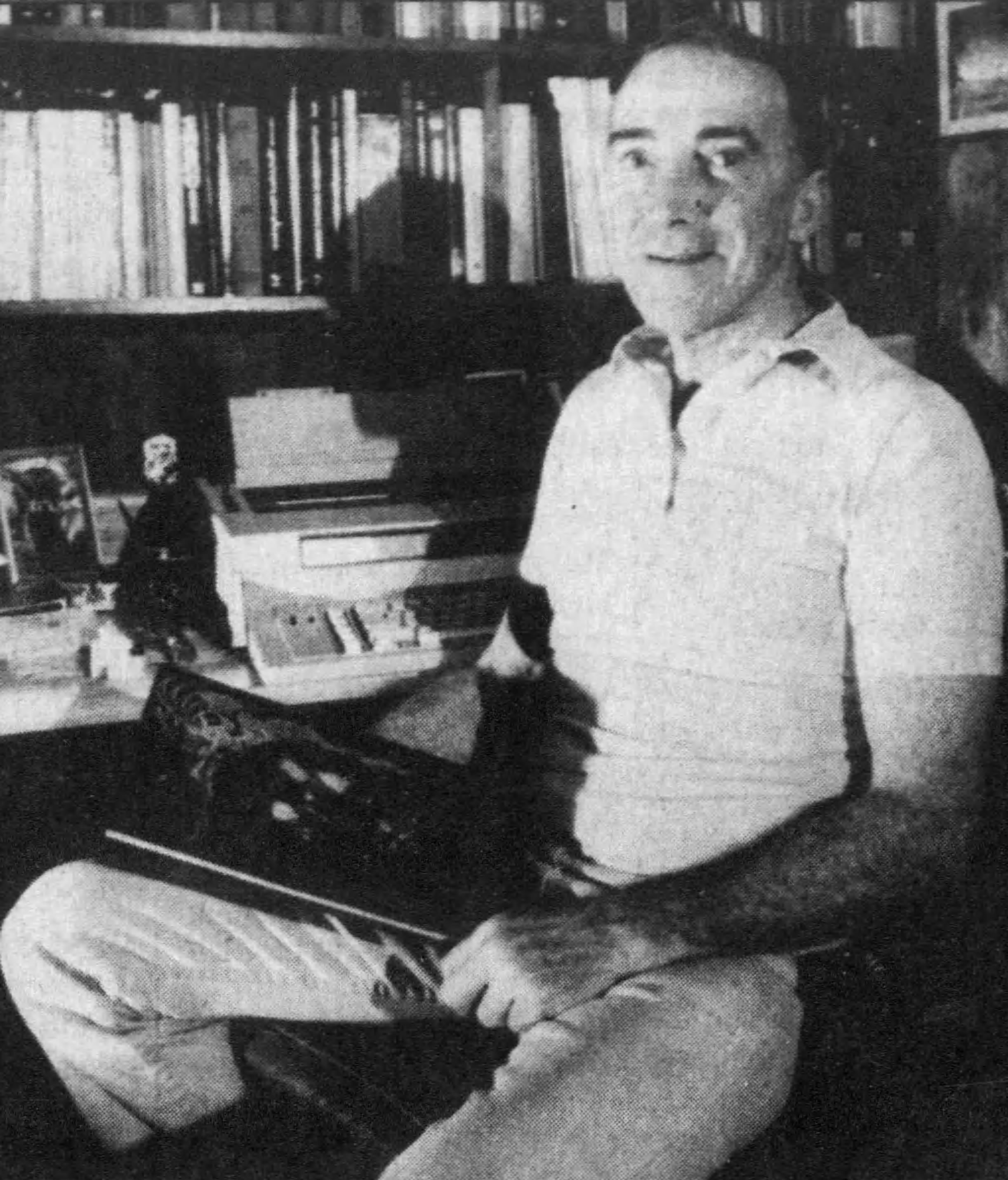
- Granberry in 1987
- Born: March 15, 1929; East Orange, New Jersey, U.S.
- Died: June 5, 2018 (aged 89)
- Occupations: Anthropologist; archaeologist; linguist; ghost hunter; writer
- Parent(s): Edwin Granberry; Mabel Leflar Granberry

Julian Maddux Granberry (March 15, 1929 – June 5, 2018) was an American anthropologist, archaeologist, linguist, ghost hunter, and writer, who specialized in writings about the Indigenous peoples, languages, and archaeology of the Caribbean and Florida. He wrote 17 books and a variety of articles, primarily on Indigenous and Caribbean historical and archaeological topics. Following his retirement from teaching, Granberry founded the organization Ghost Hunters, which investigated over 10,000 reported hauntings nationwide.

== Early life ==
Julian Maddux Granberry was born in East Orange, New Jersey in 1929. He was raised in Winter Park, Florida. His parents were Mabel Leflar Granberry and Edwin Granberry. Julian's father Edwin, a writer, was friends with the novelist Margaret Mitchell, who wrote Gone with the Wind. Julian published Letters From Margaret, a book of correspondence between his father and Mitchell. In 2002, the Margaret Mitchell House and Museum in Atlanta, Georgia, marked its fifth anniversary by celebrating the book.

== Career ==
=== Anthropology, archaeology, and linguistics ===
Granberry received a doctorate in archaeology and linguistics from the University at Buffalo in 1959. He received additional education at Yale University and the University of Florida. He worked for over 25 years teaching at multiple universities, including the University of Florida, St. John Fisher University, a university in Canada, and a college in the Bahamas.

During the 1950s, he conducted studies of the Indigenous Apalachee and Timucua peoples of Florida. In 1997, the federally recognized Chitimacha tribe consulted with Granberry about reviving the Chitimacha language. In his book Languages of the Pre-Columbian Antilles, Granberry advanced his view that the Indigenous peoples of the Greater Antilles historically spoke an Arawakan language called Taíno. Granberry and Vescelius (2004) describe two varieties of this language: "Classical Taíno", spoken in Puerto Rico and most of Hispaniola, and "Ciboney Taíno", spoken in the Bahamas (the Lucayan language), most of Cuba, western Hispaniola, and Jamaica. In 2000, the federally recognized Mohegan Tribe in Connecticut consulted with Granberry about how to recreate a modern Mohegan language.

=== Ghost hunting ===
In the 1980s, during his retirement, Granberry developed an interest in ghosts and ghost hunting. He founded an organization called Ghost Hunters, which functioned as an investigatory team that proclaimed the use of "empirical scientific" methods to detect ghosts. In 1987, he told the Journal and Courier that he had never personally encountered a ghost. He stated that "We've got about a dozen serious reports, about half from Florida". According to Granberry, the Ghost Hunters investigated over 10,000 reported hauntings nationwide. Granberry was also a member of the American Society for Psychical Research, an organization for paranormal investigators.

== Personal life ==
Despite his interest in the paranormal, Granberry described himself as "agnostic in every sense". He compared ghosts to UFOs; he believed that there were unexplained reports in both categories. In 1987, Granberry lived in Horseshoe Beach, Florida.

== See also ==
- Indigenous archaeology

== Bibliography ==
- Essential Swedish Grammar, Dover Publications, Inc., 1991.
- Letters from Margaret, 1st Book Library, 2001.
- Languages of the Pre-Columbian Antilles, Julian Granberry and Gary S. Vescelius, University of Alabama Press, 2004.
- The Americas That Might Have Been: Native American Social Systems through Time, University of Alabama Press, 2005.
- The Calusa: Linguistic and Cultural Origins and Relationships, University of Alabama Press, 2011.
- A Grammar and Dictionary of the Timucua Language, 1984
