= Dorothy Hope Smith =

American artist

- Born: October 1, 1895; Hyattsville, Maryland, U.S.
- Died: December 16, 1955 (aged 60); Westport, Connecticut, U.S.
- Burial place: Willowbrook Cemetery; Westport, Connecticut, U.S. 41°09′17″N 73°21′43″W
- Education: The School of the Art Institute of Chicago
- Occupations: Artist; Painter
- Known for: Drawing of the Original Gerber Baby
- Style: Charcoal Drawing
- Spouse: Perry Barlow (m. 1922)
- Children: 2

Dorothy Hope Smith (October 1, 1895 – December 16, 1955) was an American artist and painter, best known as the artist who drew the Gerber Baby.

== Early life ==
Dorothy Hope Smith was born in Hyattsville, Maryland to Lincoln B. and Mary L. Smith. She had 2 sisters, Edith and Clare, of which Dorothy was in the middle. In the early 1910s, Dorothy's family relocated to Chicago, where she spent her adolescence.

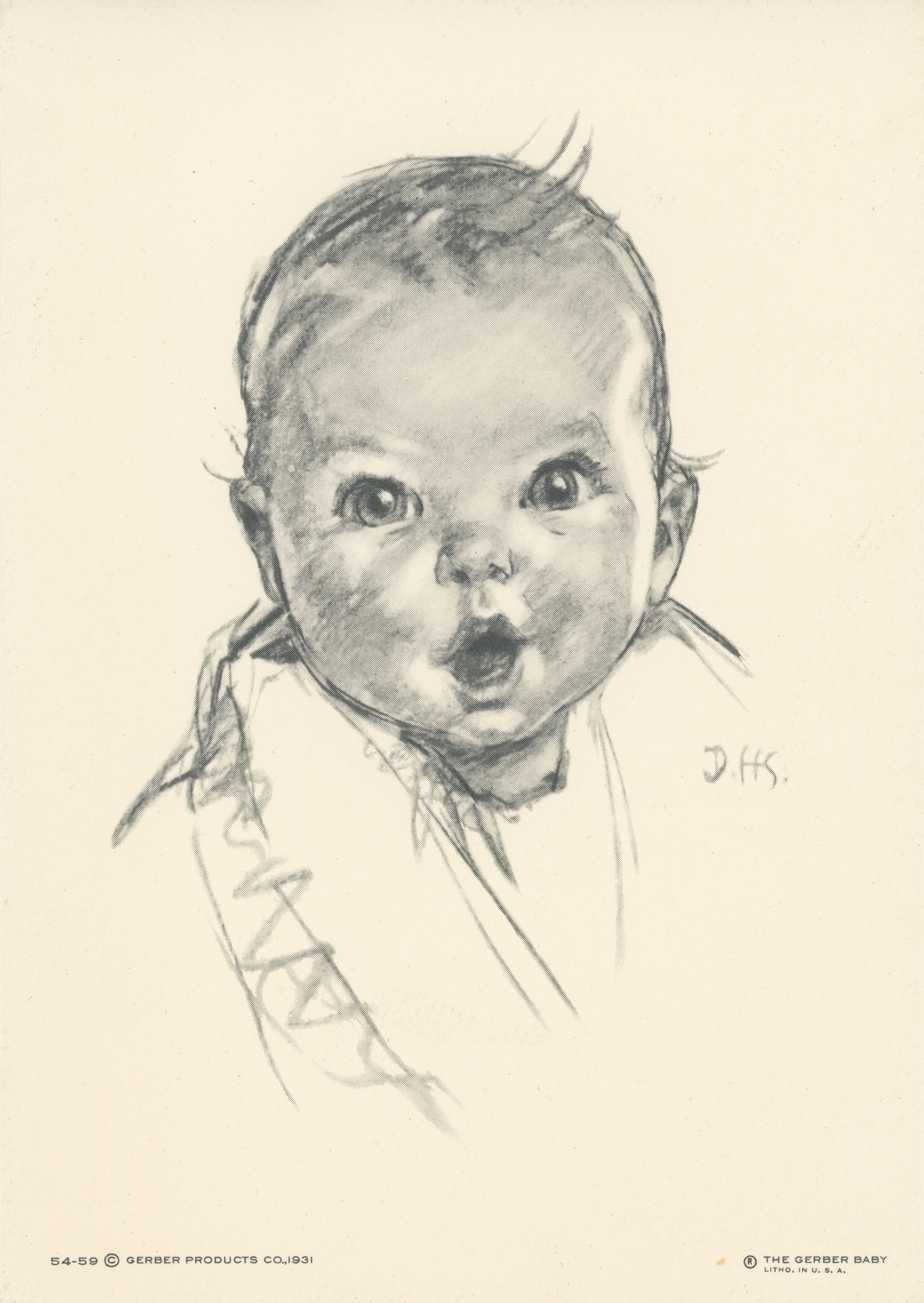
A lithograph of Smith's drawing

Smith studied illustration at The School of the Art Institute of Chicago where she met Perry Barlow. They were married February 22, 1922 in Manhattan, New York City, and honeymooned in France.

They moved to New York City after they wed to pursue separate illustration careers. Eventually, the couple worked out of their Westport, Connecticut home.

== Career ==
Smith was a commercial illustrator specializing in babies and children. She was one of the "Ivory Soap Baby" illustrations for Procter & Gamble, illustrating children's books for Putnam and several magazine covers.

- Woman's Home Companion (August 1925)
- Woman's Home Companion (September 1934)
- Parent-Teacher Magazine (April 1935)
- Parent's Magazine (June 1936)
- The Farmer's Wife Magazine (December 1936)

== Gerber baby ==
Smith's famous Gerber Baby drawing came about through a contest. In 1928, Gerber invited artists to submit drawings of babies for a contest. Dorothy submitted a preliminary charcoal sketch. The sketch was created from a snapshot of Ann Turner, the child of a family friend. Dorothy's unfinished submission was intended more as an inquiry as to what the age of the baby should be and what the ad size would be. Dorothy intended to finish the sketch if accepted. The Gerber Company judges, however, preferred the simplicity of the illustration when compared to other more elaborate entries. Smith won $300 in the contest, selling the rights of her drawing to Gerber. Due to its popularity, Gerber officially trademarked the drawing in 1931.

Smith worked regularly from the 1920s until her death in 1955, serving as a successful commercial illustrator for many products.

== Personal life ==
Smith's husband, Perry Barlow, whom she married on February 22, 1922, was a cartoonist for The New Yorker magazine, drawing 135 covers over the years in addition to many cartoons. He also contributed work to Collier's, The Saturday Evening Post and others. Because Perry was partially colorblind, Smith helped with the color process of his work. Smith and Perry had two sons, Collins and Peter. Peter's child is Smith's only granddaughter. Dorrie carries her namesake, Dorothy "Dorrie" Barlow Thomas. After Dorothy's death in 1955, their son Peter continued the color treatments to Perry's work.
