= Duane E. Dewey =

American former combat Marine (1931–2021)

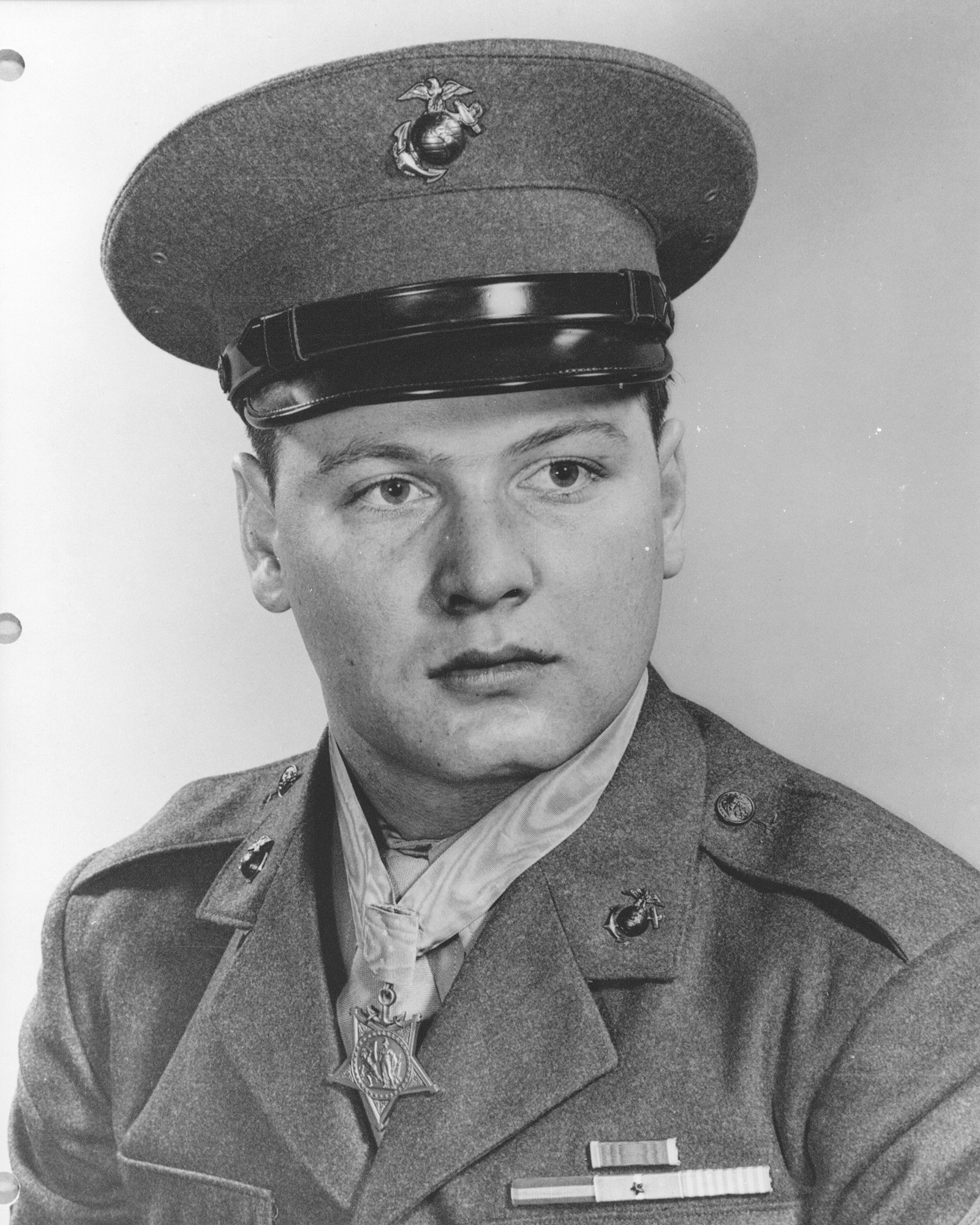
- Born: November 16, 1931; Grand Rapids, Michigan, U.S.
- Died: October 11, 2021 (aged 89); St. Augustine, Florida, U.S.
- Military career
- Allegiance: United States
- Branch: United States Marine Corps
- Service years: 1951–1952
- Rank: Corporal
- Units: Company E, 2nd Battalion, 5th Marines, 1st Marine Division
- Conflicts: Korean War
- Awards: Medal of Honor; Purple Heart

Duane Edgar Dewey (November 16, 1931 – October 11, 2021) was an American combat Marine. He received the United States military's highest decoration for valor, the Medal of Honor, for his actions on April 16, 1952, during the Korean War. Although wounded by an enemy grenade, he smothered another exploding grenade with his own body to save the life of a corpsman and the other Marines around him.

== Early life and education ==
Dewey was born on November 16, 1931, in Grand Rapids, Michigan and died October 11, 2021, at the age of 89 in St. Augustine, Florida and was buried with full military honors at the Florida National Cemetery at Bushnell, Florida. He attended school in Muskegon until 1947. He then worked for six months on a farm in South Haven, and for a year as a foundry worker at National Motor Casting (formerly Marshall Casting), also in South Haven.

== Marine Corps ==
Dewey signed with the United States Marine Corps Reserve on March 7, 1951, for an "'indefinite' enlistment – the duration of the war plus six months." He completed recruit training at the Marine Corps Recruit Depot Parris Island, South Carolina, and underwent intensive combat training at Camp Pendleton, California.

Dewey embarked for Korea in September 1951. He participated in the United Nations summer-fall offensive of 1951 and the second winter of Korean fighting. Corporal Dewey earned the Medal of Honor on April 16, 1952, near Panmunjom, while serving as leader of a machine gun squad with Company E, 5th Marines, 1st Marine Division. He had been wounded by a grenade that had exploded at his feet, and was being treated by a navy medical corpsman when an enemy grenade landed at the squad's position. Yanking the corpsman to the ground and warning members of the squad, Dewey flung himself on the grenade shouting, "Doc, I got it in my hip pocket!" The grenade exploded, lifting Dewey off the ground and inflicting "gaping shrapnel wounds throughout the lower part of his body". In addition, he sustained a bullet wound to the stomach.

After treatment of his wounds in Korea, Dewey was evacuated to the United States Naval Hospital in Yokosuka, Japan, and then to the naval hospitals at Mare Island, California, and Great Lakes, Illinois. Following his recuperation at Great Lakes, he was released from active duty on August 19, 1952.

On March 12, 1953, Dewey was the first person to receive the Medal of Honor from President Dwight D. Eisenhower. After presenting the medal to Dewey during the ceremony at the White House, Eisenhower said to him, "You must have a body of steel."

== Medal of Honor ==
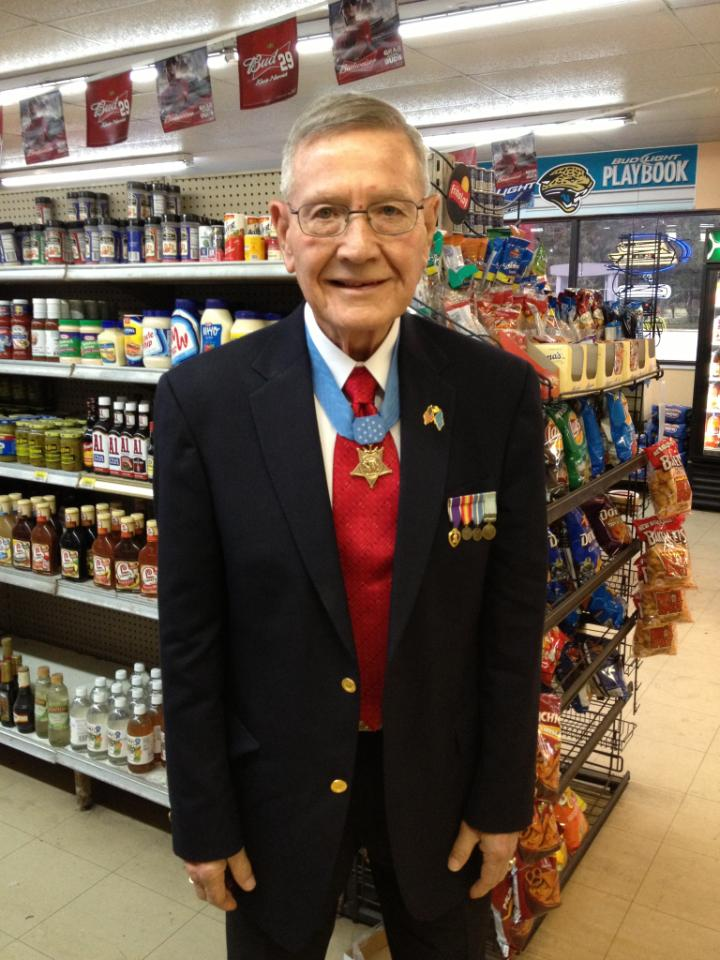
CPL Dewey 2013

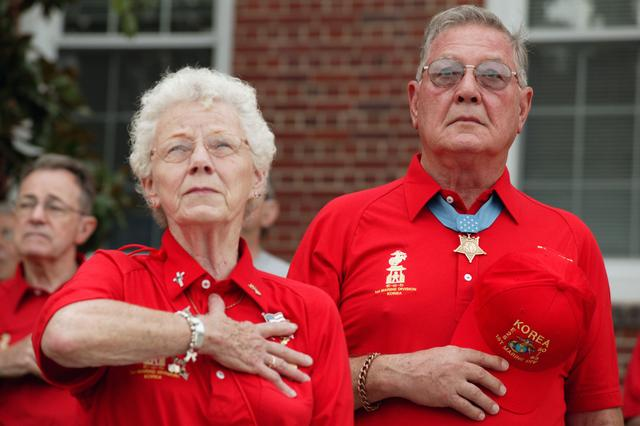
Dewey and his wife in 2004

The President of the United States takes pride in presenting the MEDAL OF HONOR to

CORPORAL DUANE E. DEWEY
UNITED STATES MARINE CORPS RESERVE

for service as set forth in the following

CITATION:

For conspicuous gallantry and intrepidity at the risk of his life above and beyond the call of duty while serving as a Gunner in a Machine-Gun Platoon of Company E, Second Battalion, Fifth Marines, First Marine Division (Reinforced), in action against enemy aggressor forces near Panmunjom, Korea, on April 16, 1952. When an enemy grenade landed close to this position while he and his assistant gunner were receiving medical attention for their wounds during a fierce night attack by numerically superior hostile forces, Corporal DEWEY, although suffering intense pain, immediately pulled the corpsman to the ground and, shouting a warning to the other Marines around him, bravely smothered the deadly missile with his body, personally absorbing the full force of the explosion to save his comrades from possible injury or death. His indomitable courage, outstanding initiative and valiant efforts in behalf of others in the face of almost certain death reflect the highest credit upon Corporal DEWEY and enhance the finest traditions of the United States Naval Service.

/S/ DWIGHT D. EISENHOWER

== Awards and decorations ==
Dewey's military awards include:

| 1st row | Medal of Honor | | |
| 2nd row | Purple Heart | Combat Action Ribbon | Navy Presidential Unit Citation |
| 3rd row | Marine Corps Good Conduct Medal | National Defense Service Medal | Korean Service Medal with 2 Campaign stars |
| 4th row | Korean Presidential Unit Citation | United Nations Service Medal Korea | Korean War Service Medal |

== See also ==
- List of Korean War Medal of Honor recipients
