= Captain Easy =

American comic strip

- Captain Easy, Soldier of Fortune: Volume One (Fantagraphics, 2010)
- Author(s): Roy Crane (1933–1943); Leslie Turner (1943–c. 1969); Mel Graff (1960–1969); Bill Crooks (1970–1988); Jim Lawrence (1970–1981); Mick Casale (1981–1988)
- Current status/schedule: Concluded daily and Sunday strip
- Launch date: July 30, 1933
- End date: October 1, 1988
- Syndicate(s): Newspaper Enterprise Association
- Publisher(s): Big Little Books; Dell Comics; NBM Publishing; Fantagraphics Books
- Genre: Action-adventure
- Preceded by: Wash Tubbs

Captain Easy, Soldier of Fortune is an American action-adventure comic strip created by Roy Crane that was syndicated by Newspaper Enterprise Association beginning on Sunday, July 30, 1933. The strip ran for more than five decades until it was discontinued on October 1, 1988.

== Characters and story ==
Originally, Captain Easy was a supporting character in the daily comic strip Wash Tubbs, which focused on the adventures of the zany Washington Tubbs II. On February 26, 1929, Crane introduced taciturn toughguy Captain Easy, who soon took over the strip. On July 30, 1933, Crane launched Captain Easy, Soldier of Fortune as a Sunday page starring Easy.

Captain Easy was a chivalrous Southern adventurer in the classic adventure-hero mold. After a series of globe-trotting adventures, Easy enlisted in the U.S. Army during World War II, afterwards becoming a private detective.

== Sunday strips ==
The Sunday adventures were initially unconnected to those of the Wash Tubbs strip and dealt with Easy's adventures prior to meeting Tubbs. They are considered a tour-de-force by Crane, who crafted layouts intended to be seen as a coherent whole rather than a disparate collection of panels. Comics historian R. C. Harvey described Crane's Sunday page innovation:

On Sundays, Crane concentrated on Easy, and these pages soon absorbed him. The art chores on the dailies were assigned to others in the NEA bullpen so that Crane could pour his imagination into the weekly installments of Easy's adventures. Crane loved the spacious potential of the Sunday page—as would any graphic artist; and he spent most of his energy here rather than on the less visually challenging dailies. And on the Sunday pages, Crane did some of his finest work. Since he was drawing for the addition of color, Crane shaded these pages very little, so his artwork here is refined to its unembellished essence. And in its essence, Crane's work demonstrates the marvelous precision and telling efficacy of a line so simple it seems naive. But appearances in art are as often deceiving as they are in life. The simplicity of Crane's linework is the ultimate sophistication of irreducible economy, the absolute in purity of graphic expression.

Crane's Sunday pictures are carefully, lovingly, drawn, every panel composed to tell the story while sustaining the illusion of time and place. And the pages themselves are artful designs, irregular albeit nonetheless pleasing patterns of panels rather than uniform grids. But these layouts are not simply designs: they were devised to give visual impact to the story. When Crane drew Easy at the brink of a cliff, he gave depth to the scene by depicting it in a vertical panel that is two- or three-tiers tall. When Easy leads a cavalry charge or paddles a canoe down a lazy river, the panel is as wide as the page, giving panoramic sweep to the scene depicted.

However, in 1937, the Newspaper Enterprise Association syndicate, which employed Crane and owned the strip, introduced a new policy requiring Sunday pages designed so the panels could be rearranged into different formats. Crane then turned the Sunday pages over to his assistant Leslie Turner so he could concentrate on the daily strip. The Tubbs and Easy characters were owned by NEA, and in 1943, Crane abandoned his strips and exited NEA to begin Buz Sawyer, a strip he owned outright. Crane's last daily Wash Tubbs strip ran on May 29, 1943.

== After Roy Crane ==
After Crane's departure, Turner took control of the strips, with his assistant Walt Scott drawing the Sunday page. Easy was in the Army by that time, and Tubbs had an increasingly unimportant role, so both daily and Sunday strips displayed the name Captain Easy in 1949 (with Wash Tubbs fading away).

Scott drew the Sunday strip until 1952, when Turner took it over with inks by assistant Bill Crooks. Mel Graff began ghosting the Sunday page in 1960. Turner continued to draw the daily strip until he retired in 1969, with his last credited daily strip running January 17, 1970.

Following Turner's departure, the strips passed to his assistants, Bill Crooks (art) and Jim Lawrence (story). The pair produced both the daily and Sunday strips from January 19, 1970, to May 23, 1981. The Sunday page ended on March 29, 1981. Mick Casale joined as the new writer, and he and Crooks produced the daily strip until it was discontinued on October 1, 1988.

Before the Sunday Captain Easy, there was a short-lived Wash Tubbs Sunday third, which began with gags featuring Tubbs and later puzzles for children. It ran from 10 May 1931 to 9 July 1933. Captain Easy appeared in one strip.

== Reprints ==
Wash Tubbs and Captain Easy were featured in Big Little Books during the 1930s. They also appeared in Dell comic books from 1936 (Captain Easy, as early as The Funnies #1, October 1936 cover date) and 1937 (Wash Tubbs, as early as The Comics #1, March 1937 cover date) into the 1940s.

Almost the entire 1924–43 run of Crane's strip was reprinted in Wash Tubbs and Captain Easy, an 18-volume black-and-white series featuring biographical and historical commentary by Bill Blackbeard. With production, design and strip restoration by Bhob Stewart, this series was published by NBM Publishing on a quarterly schedule from 1987 to 1992.

Between 2010 and 2013, Fantagraphics Books printed a series of four hardback books reprinting Roy Crane's complete run of Captain Easy Sunday pages from 1933-1943.

Fantagraphics also published The Best of Captain Easy And Wash Tubbs in 2015—a collection of ten selected daily strip adventure continuities drawn by Roy Crane ranging from 1928 to 1935.

== Sources ==
- Strickler, Dave. Syndicated Comic Strips and Artists, 1924–1995: The Complete Index. Cambria, California: Comics Access, 1995. ISBN 0-9700077-0-1
