= Leonard T. Schroeder =

United States Army officer (1918–2009)

Leonard T. Schroeder Jr.
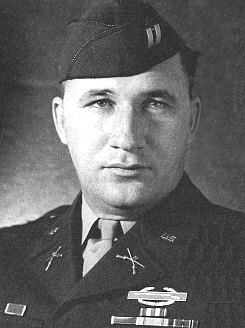
- As a captain during World War II
- Born: July 16, 1918; Linthicum, Maryland, U.S.
- Died: May 26, 2009 (aged 90); Largo, Florida, U.S.
- Burial place: Florida National Cemetery
- Military career
- Allegiance: United States
- Branch: United States Army
- Service years: 1941–1971
- Rank: Colonel
- Nicknames: Max; Moose
- Conflicts: World War II; Normandy Landings; Utah Beach; Korean War; Vietnam War
- Awards: Silver Star; Bronze Star; Purple Heart

Leonard Treherne Schroeder Jr. (July 16, 1918 – May 26, 2009) was a colonel in the United States Army, who served on active duty from 1941 to 1971. As a captain during World War II, he commanded Company F of the 2nd Battalion, 8th Infantry Regiment, 4th Infantry Division in the Normandy Landings on June 6, 1944, landing on Utah Beach in France. Leading the men of his company, Schroeder was the first American soldier to come ashore from a landing craft in the D-Day invasion.

== Early years ==
Schroeder was born in the Baltimore suburb of Linthicum Heights, Maryland, on July 16, 1918. Although bullied as a child, Schroeder became an outstanding athlete in high school, graduating in 1937 from nearby Glen Burnie High School where he played soccer and baseball. While captain of his high school's soccer team in 1936, they won the Maryland state championship. He then attended the University of Maryland, College Park, on a full athletic scholarship. While there, he was enrolled in the Reserve Officers' Training Corps (ROTC). In June, 1941, Schroeder graduated from the University of Maryland and was commissioned as a second lieutenant in the U.S. Army at the age of 22. In December, 1941, he married the former Margaret Nicholson, whom he had met while in high school. The couple's first child, a son, was born the following year. They would later have two more children (a daughter and another son).

== Army career ==
Assigned to the 4th Infantry Division, Schroeder was stationed at Camp Gordon, near Augusta, Georgia, until September 1943, when his division began training in Florida for assault landings using various amphibious craft. In January 1944, the Division left the U.S. and arrived in the south of England, where they continued practice amphibious landings in preparation for the unprecedented Normandy Landings.

=== D-Day Invasion ===
On D-Day, June 6, 1944, Schroeder was a 25-year-old captain in command of the 219 men of Company F of the 2nd Battalion, 8th Infantry Regiment, 4th Infantry Division. The 8th Infantry Regiment was ordered to make the initial D-Day landing on Utah Beach as part of the invasion. Prior to D-Day, Brigadier General Theodore Roosevelt Jr., had visited an ill Schroeder in an English hospital, urging him to get well quickly so that Roosevelt could ride in Schroeder's boat to the beach. Calling the young captain by his nickname, Roosevelt said. "Moose, you got to get out because I’m riding on your boat. I want you to get me on the beach in your boat when you go ashore".

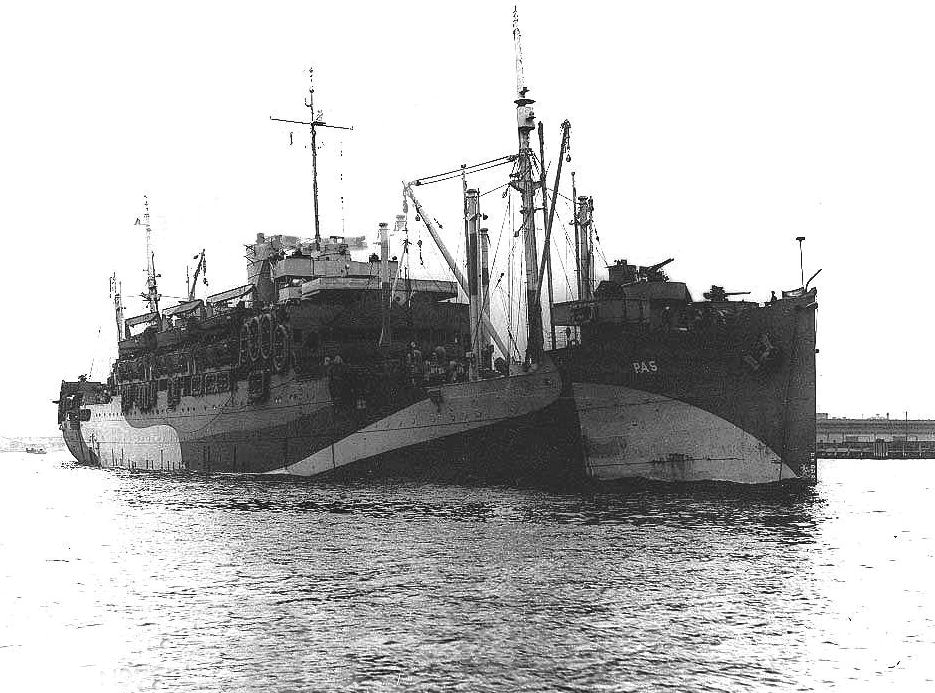
The USS Barnett, six months after D-Day

As they sailed to France from England on the night of June 5 aboard the navy's USS Barnett on the rough English Channel, they heard Supreme Allied Commander General Dwight D. Eisenhower's exhortation to the troops over the radio, "Together, we shall achieve victory". Afterwards, the company commanders were summoned by the 2nd Battalion commander, Lieutenant Colonel Carlton MacNeely, to Brigadier General Roosevelt's quarters for a final briefing before the invasion. When the meeting ended near midnight, Schroeder later recounted, the officers "wished each other well and shook hands", and MacNeely affectionately put his arm around Schroeder's shoulders, "Well, Moose, this is it. Give 'em hell!" Schroeder said they both "choked up" and he replied, "Well, colonel, I'll see you on the beach!" At 2:30 a.m. on June 6, Schroeder's company left the Barnett to board their LCVP landing craft. Before departing the Barnett to face the enemy, Schroeder wrote a letter to his wife: "I told her where I was, what I was about to do, and how much I loved her".

At 6:28 a.m., two minutes ahead of the time set as H-Hour, Schroeder's unit was in the first wave of 20 LCVPs to disembark on Utah Beach. Schroeder's own assault boat, commanded by navy Lieutenant (j.g.) Abraham Condiotti of Brooklyn, New York, was the first to hit the beach. In his boat were 32 men, including Brigadier General Roosevelt. He recalled to a television interviewer in 2008 that "80 percent of the guys on the boat were sick" due to the rough seas and, as his landing craft in the first wave neared the shore, Allied forces were still shelling Company F's designated landing site on Utah Beach. "They were dropping all those bombs on the place where we were going in" and his company had to disembark "without getting bombed by our own guys". Schroeder recalled years later that American air support was "running a little late and we were running ahead of time. They were dropping all those bombs on the place where we were going in," he said.

Leaving the lead landing craft and carrying a carbine rifle on his left shoulder while holding a .45-caliber pistol above the waist-high water, Schroeder waded the final 100 yards (91 m) from his landing craft to the beach, traversing the remaining distance as quickly as possible due to enemy fire. The soldiers encountered machine gun fire from German pillboxes and artillery shelling, underwater mines, barbed wire, and trenches. His company's mission was to break up the enemy's fortified seawall and then liberate a village five miles inland. Half of his men were casualties and Schroeder himself was shot twice in the left arm. He was hospitalized in England and later in South Carolina and almost had his arm amputated due to the severity of his wounds. Asked later if he knew that he was the first soldier on the beach, he said, "I knew my company was in the first wave, but I didn't know I was actually going to be the first ashore. Besides, I was too scared to think about it". Afterwards, he was hailed in a Pentagon press release as "the first GI to invade Europe". The Baltimore Sun said of Schroeder afterwards, "when his boot touched French soil, it was a great moment in history". He earned a Silver Star, Bronze Star, and Purple Heart during World War II, in addition to numerous other decorations.

=== Postwar army career ===
After World War II, Schroeder remained in the army as a career officer, serving on active duty for 30 years. In the late 1940s, Schroeder lived with his family in Japan, where he was part of the occupation forces with the rank of Major. Upon the outbreak of the Korean War in 1950, he was an Air Operations Officer, coordinating air support for ground forces and planning bombing strikes. After the Korean War ended in 1953, he participated in a British Staff College critique of World War II battle strategies. One of his fellow students was Israeli military leader and future prime minister Yitzhak Rabin. Later, Schroeder served during the Vietnam War in the late 1960s. He had frequent overseas assignments during the 1950s–1960s, including England, Greece, and Turkey. In the U.S., he was stationed at Fort Knox, Kentucky, and Fort Meade, Maryland (very near his boyhood home in Linthicum Heights).

== Later years and death ==
Following his retirement from the Army as a full colonel in 1971, Schroeder and his wife Margaret moved to Largo, Florida. On the 50th anniversary of the D-Day Invasion in June, 1994, he was feted in Normandy and featured on a French television broadcast describing his experiences that day as the first American to come ashore at Normandy. Produced by Jean-Christophe Giesbert, Les héros du 6 juin: Le débarquement de 1944 ("The heroes of June 6: the landing of 1944"), is available in French on DVD. A 50th anniversary cover feature in the French magazine VSD, published June 2, 1994, profiled Schroeder's life and D-Day exploits. In an interview for the magazine article, he said, "Today, I realize that to be the first man ashore is an immense honor, yet I do not merit it more than anyone else. Five of my men died down there at Normandy. They alone are the heroes". An exhibit displaying Schroeder's D-Day invasion uniform, boots, and equipment, along with a narration of his D-Day experience recorded in his voice, was presented for many years at the old Armed Forces Military Museum in Largo, Florida. Shortly before his death from emphysema early on the morning of May 26, 2009, Schroeder reflected on his 30 years of military service to the nation, saying he still missed the comradeship and family-like brotherhood of army life. At televised ceremonies on June 6, 2009, commemorating the 65th anniversary of the D-Day invasion, the Armed Forces Military Museum presented Schroeder's family with a plaque in his memory. The plaque displayed the insignia of the 19 Army divisions that landed on the Normandy beaches. He is interred at the Florida National Cemetery in Bushnell, Florida, alongside his wife, Margaret, who died on January 8, 2010.
