= Buz Sawyer =

American comic strip

- Roy Crane's Buz Sawyer (November 28, 1943). This is the first Buz Sawyer Sunday strip. Sidekick Sweeney, who joined Buz in the daily strip adventures, was the central character in Crane's Sunday strips.
- Author(s): Roy Crane (1943–1977); Edwin Granberry (c. 1943–1983); Clark Haas (Sundays, late 1940s–1962); Al Wenzel (Sundays, 1962–1974)
- Illustrator(s): Roy Crane (1943–1977); Henry G. Schlensker (1977–1983); John Celardo (1983–1989)
- Current status/schedule: Concluded daily & Sunday strip
- Launch date: November 1, 1943
- End date: October 7, 1989
- Syndicate(s): King Features Syndicate
- Publisher(s): Dragon Lady Press; Manuscript Press; Fantagraphics Books
- Genre: Adventure
- Preceded by: Wash Tubbs and Captain Easy

Buz Sawyer is a comic strip created by Roy Crane. Distributed by King Features Syndicate, it had a run from November 1, 1943 to October 7, 1989. The last strip signed by Crane was dated 21 April 1979.

== Characters and story ==
During World War II, the adventurous John Singer Sawyer, nicknamed Buz Sawyer, became a Naval Aviator and flew as an ace Navy fighter and dive bomber pilot in the Pacific Theater where he had numerous adventures with his sidekick, enlisted Naval Aircrewman Rosco Sweeney. As a civilian in the post-World War II years, Buz became an oil company troubleshooter, traveling to far-flung locales. He married Christy Jameson on 13 December 1948, and their son Pepper was born in 1951. Buz rejoined the Navy in the 1950s and flew carrier-based reconnaissance attack jets over Vietnam during the 1960s.

Roy Crane was one of the innovators of the adventure comic strip. Wash Tubbs began in 1924 as a humorous story about the romantic adventures of Washington Tubbs, but increasingly Tubbs became involved in exciting adventures in exotic places. With the creation of the popular soldier of fortune Captain Easy in 1929, the strip became, along with Tarzan of the Apes and Buck Rogers, one of the first adventure strips. However, Crane was an employee of the Newspaper Enterprise Association syndicate, which owned the rights to the Tubbs and Easy characters. Crane approached King Features with an idea for a new strip, and when they offered him ownership, he abandoned Wash Tubbs and Captain Easy in 1943, giving full concentration to launching Buz Sawyer. Crane remembered the events this way:

I drew Wash Tubbs until 1943, when I started drawing Buz Sawyer. It was during World War II, so I decided to make Buz a Navy pilot. It promised lots of action, and I also felt that I would be making a contribution to the war effort. Before actually starting the strip, and to insure authenticity, I did a great deal of research. I’ve always loved to travel, so I went to many different places in search of information that I could use in the strip; I even spent some time aboard an aircraft carrier. In addition, I gathered together a very large collection of Navy photographs to use as background material. Rosco Sweeney, who is now featured on the entire Sunday page, was Buz’s wartime buddy. He was also the gunner on the Navy bomber which Buz flew. After the war, I had Sweeney start an orange grove in Florida… the same as I did. I have no plans for bringing Buz into the Sunday page. Action is one of the most important elements in a strip. In fact, I feel that graphic pictorialization is the essence of the comic strip medium and that is what makes it a unique art form. When newspapers cut the size of the comic strip until there is no room left for anything but dialogue, then that will be the end of comics. Buz is conceived four weeks in advance. My collaborator, Hank Schlensker, finishes the layouts from my rough drawings. He works approximately one week behind me. I am also assisted by Al Wenzel and Edwin Granberry. I own the rights to the strip. The rendering of Buz Sawyer is done with Craftint; a technique pioneered in this strip as well as in Wash Tubbs. I have always been interested in trying new techniques, and I especially try to capture a three-dimensional quality in the strip.

== Daily strip ==
Roy Crane's Buz Sawyer (June 14–16, 1944)

Granberry began writing Buz Sawyer during the 1940s, continuing as the strip's scripter until 1983. In 1946, 31-year-old Henry G. Schlensker, who had created Biff Baker with Ernest Lynn (1941–45), settled in Orlando, where he became Crane's art assistant. An ulcer resulted in Crane's retirement from the strip in the 1960s, but he continued to work closely with Granberry and Schlensker. After Crane's death in 1977, Schlensker began signing the strip. The duo continued as a team until 1983. When they retired, John Celardo drew the daily until it was discontinued on 7 October 1989. Schlensker, who fought with the Army Air Corps in East Asia during World War II, died in 1997 at the age of 82. His wife Virginia Schlensker said that "he loved to draw, and he loved action. That strip was his whole life".

== Sunday strip – Roscoe Sweeney ==
Roscoe Sweeney, Sawyer's comic-relief sidekick, was the lead character of the Buz Sawyer Sunday strip titled Buz Sawyer Featuring His Pal Roscoe Sweeney. It began November 28, 1943, and, at first, was about Sweeney and other gunners from the aircraft carrier Tippecanoe. After World War II Roscoe often worked on a farm with his sister Lucille near Indiantown, in Martin County, Florida.

Sweeney kept looking for adventure, and in 1947 he enlisted in the naval reserve program, now named the United States Navy Reserve. Even when he was on the farm he had interesting adventures. In 1964 he and Lucille met space aliens with a flying saucer, and in 1967 he planted a tree that grew five dollar bills.

Roy Crane claimed that Sweeney was his favorite character – just an average guy, trying to do the right thing, but getting into trouble. By 1949 Roscoe Sweeney was carried in over a hundred Sunday newspapers. Roy Crane ended the Sunday comic in 1974.

== Awards ==
Roy Crane won the Reuben Award from the National Cartoonists Society in 1950 (when it was the Barney Award). He also won their Story Comic Book Award in 1965.

== Books and reprints ==
Roy Crane's comic strip was adapted into a Better Little Book, Buz Sawyer and Bomber 13.

The daily Buz Sawyer has been reprinted by Comics Art Showcase, Dragon Lady Press and Comics Revue. Manuscript Press has published two books collecting the daily strip from the beginning. Only a few scattered Sundays have ever been reprinted. The comic strip was also adapted into a Better Little Book, Buz Sawyer and Bomber 13.

In 2011, Fantagraphics Books published the first in a series of books reprinting the daily strips, along with selected Sunday strips. The first volume covers the daily strips from 1 November 1943 (the first strip) until 5 October 1945 (when Buz leaves the Navy). The second volume covers daily strips from October 1945 to July 1947, along with the Salvaduras Sunday sequence, and came out in 2012. The third volume covers daily strips from July 1947 to July 1949, and came out in 2014. The fourth volume covers daily strips from July 1949 to June 1952, and came out in 2016. The fifth volume covers daily strips from June 1952 to May 1955, and came out in 2025.

== Digital rebirth ==
In June 2006, King Features' email service, DailyINK, now Comics Kingdom, began running Buz Sawyer dailies from the beginning. By 2009, this run had brought Buz into civilian life. All of these strips are missing the bottom quarter inch of art.

== Episode guide ==
Story arcs in the early years of the daily strip:

- 1943
  - War in the Pacific
- 1944
  - Island Raids
  - Sultry
- 1945
  - Mr. Flint
  - Civilian Life
  - Sultry’s Tiger
- 1946
  - The Mad Baron
  - Salvaduras (daily and Sunday)
- 1947
  - Africa
  - Vacation with Christy
  - Thursty Collins
  - Harry Sparrow
- 1948
  - Miss Freeze
  - The Search for Buz
  - The Wedding Present
- 1949
  - African Honeymoon
  - Monkey Business
  - Revolution
- 1950
  - Buz Alone
  - Diana
  - William Shakespeare
- 1951
  - Wish Jones
  - Alaska
  - Doldrums
  - Zazarof
- 1952
  - The Hawks Boys
  - Locusts
  - Panazuela Oil
- 1953
  - Island of the Lotus Eaters
  - Christy’s Baby
  - Test Pilot
- 1954
  - Hurricane Hunters
  - VTO
- 1955
  - Paint
  - Mystery Plane
  - All Washed Up
- 1956
  - “Ginger” Schnaps
  - The Cobbs
