= Roy Crane =

American cartoonist

- Born: Royston Campbell Crane; November 22, 1901 Abilene, Texas, U.S.
- Died: July 7, 1977 (aged 75) Orlando, Florida, U.S.
- Area: Cartoonist
- Notable works: Wash Tubbs; Captain Easy; Buz Sawyer
- Awards: Billy DeBeck Memorial Award (1950); Reuben Award Story Comic Strip Award (1965); New York Banshee Society Silver Lady Award (1961)
- Spouse: Evelyn Cecila Hatcher

Royston Campbell Crane (November 22, 1901 – July 7, 1977), who signed his work Roy Crane, was an American cartoonist who created the comic strip characters Wash Tubbs, Captain Easy and Buz Sawyer. He pioneered the adventure comic strip, establishing the conventions and artistic approach of that genre. Comics historian R. C. Harvey wrote, "Many of those who drew the earliest adventure strips were inspired and influenced by his work."

== Biography ==
Born in Abilene, Texas, Crane grew up in nearby Sweetwater. When he was 14, he took the Charles N. Landon correspondence course in cartooning. He initially attended college at Hardin-Simmons University in Abilene and later the University of Texas, where he was a member of Phi Kappa Psi fraternity. At 19, he studied for six months at the Academy of Fine Arts in Chicago. His early work history was a checkered one, including pitching tents for a Chautauqua, a seaman's berth and a stint riding the rails. In 1922, he began his newspaper cartooning career on the New York World, where he assisted H. T. Webster. Crane was also influenced by the work of cartoonist Ethel Hays, especially in the drawing of women.

=== Wash Tubbs and Captain Easy ===
In 1924, Crane approached Charles N. Landon, an editor at the Newspaper Enterprise Association. Landon and Crane discussed a strip titled Washington Tubbs II about a diminutive goof employed at a grocery store. With the title shortened to Wash Tubbs, the strip debuted April 14, 1924. After four months, Crane tired of the gag-a-day format and sent his pint-size hero hunting for a treasure buried somewhere on a South Pacific island. The strip then evolved into a rollicking adventure yarn, with Crane introducing innovations in storytelling, sound effects and layouts, as noted by pop culture historian Tim DeForest:

Though played mostly for laughs, the storyline contained a notable element of danger as well... Crane was developing strength as an artist that added to his already strong figure work. He had an eye for detail, paying close attention to background and to the overall layout of each panel. He was an innovator in the use of lettering, using bold type and exclamation points to enhance the emotions already expressed by his character design... It was Crane who pioneered the use of onomatopoeic sound effects in comics, adding "bam," "pow" and "wham" to what had previously been an almost entirely visual vocabulary. Crane had fun with this, tossing in an occasional "ker-splash" or "lickety-wop" along with what would become the more standard effects. Words as well as images became vehicles for carrying along his increasingly fast-paced storylines. Following Wash's initial adventure, the strip reverted to a dependence on gags for a time. But Wash had acquired a taste for travel and adventure.

With the introduction in 1929 of the raffish soldier of fortune, Captain Easy, Crane heightened the spirit of adventure and later created a Sunday strip focusing on Captain Easy. NBM Publishing's Flying Buttress Classics Library reprinted Crane's complete run of Wash Tubbs and Captain Easy in a series of 18 volumes. Bill Blackbeard's introductions to these books contain biographical and critical material.

=== Buz Sawyer ===
World War II rendered the comic-opera settings of Tubbs' adventures frivolous, and the strip took on a new tone. In 1943, an offer from Hearst's King Features Syndicate persuaded Crane to jump ship and create a more realistic comic strip, Buz Sawyer. He left Wash Tubbs in the hands of his assistant, Leslie Turner, a boyhood friend who had shared the hobo life with him.

Crane, an excellent draftsman despite his deceptively cartoonish style, introduced more illustrative shading techniques to the daily comics page. He progressed from line drawings with crosshatching to grease pencil on textured paper, then to Benday Dots and finally to Craftint Doubletone Paper. The Craftint paper, when brushed with chemical solutions, revealed either one or two layers of diagonal shading. Under Crane's brush, the technique yielded scenes of dramatic atmosphere, such as junglescapes fading into the misty distance. As he had done with Wash Tubbs, Crane traveled to various locations to research his plot lines and visuals. According to Crane: "In using benday, at first I thought in terms of blacks, grays, and white. Years of indifferent results and frustration followed. Gradually, black became less important. Today white is not just something to bring out the color of black... on the contrary, black is something to bring out the color of white".

Crane progressively relinquished his cartooning to assistants, and he died in Orlando, Florida in 1977.

Today, Buz Sawyer has been resurrected digitally as one of the vintage strips in King Features' emailed DailyINK subscription service.

According to comics historian Jeet Heer, Crane had a relationship with the State Department and the Navy Department and used the Buz Sawyer strip for propaganda purposes in order to support American foreign policy aims during World War II, the Cold War as well as the Vietnam War.

== Awards ==
Crane was awarded the National Cartoonists Society's Billy DeBeck Memorial Award, later renamed the Reuben Award, for Cartoonist of the Year in 1950, and their Story Comic Strip Award in 1965, both for Buz Sawyer. In 1961 he was awarded the Silver Lady by the New York Banshee Society. He was named a Distinguished Alumnus of the University of Texas at Austin in 1969.

In 1965, he established the Roy Crane Award in the Arts at the University of Texas to encourage excellence and creativity in the arts among undergraduate and graduate students. In 1980, this award was given to Berkeley Breathed.
