= Dragon Lady Comics =

Comic book shop in Toronto, Canada

- Type: Private
- Industry: Retail
- Founded: 1978 (mail order), 1979 (store)
- Founder: John Biernat
- Defunct: February 1, 2012
- Fate: Out of business
- Successor: Comic Book Lounge and Gallery
- Headquarters: Toronto, Ontario, Canada
- Area served: Toronto, Ontario, Canada (also mail order)
- Services: Comics, Magazines
- Subsidiaries: Dragon Lady Press

Dragon Lady Comics was a comic book shop in Toronto, Canada, owned by John Biernat. Founded in 1978 as a mail order company, Dragon Lady Comics was opened as a store the following year. Dragon Lady closed on 3 February 2012. The comics business reopened nearby on 8 February 2012 as the Comic Book Lounge and Gallery.

== Overview ==
Dragon Lady Comics is named after the Dragon Lady character that appeared in Milton Caniff's Terry and the Pirates comic strip. The store opened in 1978 as a mail order memorabilia business. However, in 1979, a retail outlet was opened at 200 Queen Street West, tapping into the new direct market aimed at comic collectors. In 1979, owner John Biernat was interviewed by local CBC Television station CBLT for a news segment on "the comics craze" (airdate 23 June 1979).

From 1985 to 1988, Dragon Lady Comics operated a publishing wing, Dragon Lady Press, devoted to reprints of class newspaper comic strips.

In 1996, as Queen Street was being transformed into a more upscale retail district and rents increased, Dragon Lady Comics moved to larger premises at 609 College Street. Merchandise expanded to include movie memorabilia and magazines, and a small selection of secondhand books. This change was reflected in the new (albeit rarely used) name for the store, "Dragon Lady Comics and Paper Nostalgia".

Shifts in the comics market and the lingering effects of the 2008 recession negatively affected the store's profitability, and a rent increase forced its closure early in 2012.

The store itself was split in two: the new comics and graphic novel business was relocated a few doors east under a new business name and new owner Kevin Boyd, while the back issues and paper nostalgia went with Biernat back to his home in Kitchener, ON.

== In popular culture ==
Dragon Lady Comics is mentioned in Margaret Atwood's 1993 novel, The Robber Bride.

The Dragon Lady Comics storefront is shown in the background of the 2011 film Take This Waltz at minute 107.

== See also ==
- The Beguiling
- The Silver Snail
