= Gerber Baby =

Trademark logo of the Gerber Products Company

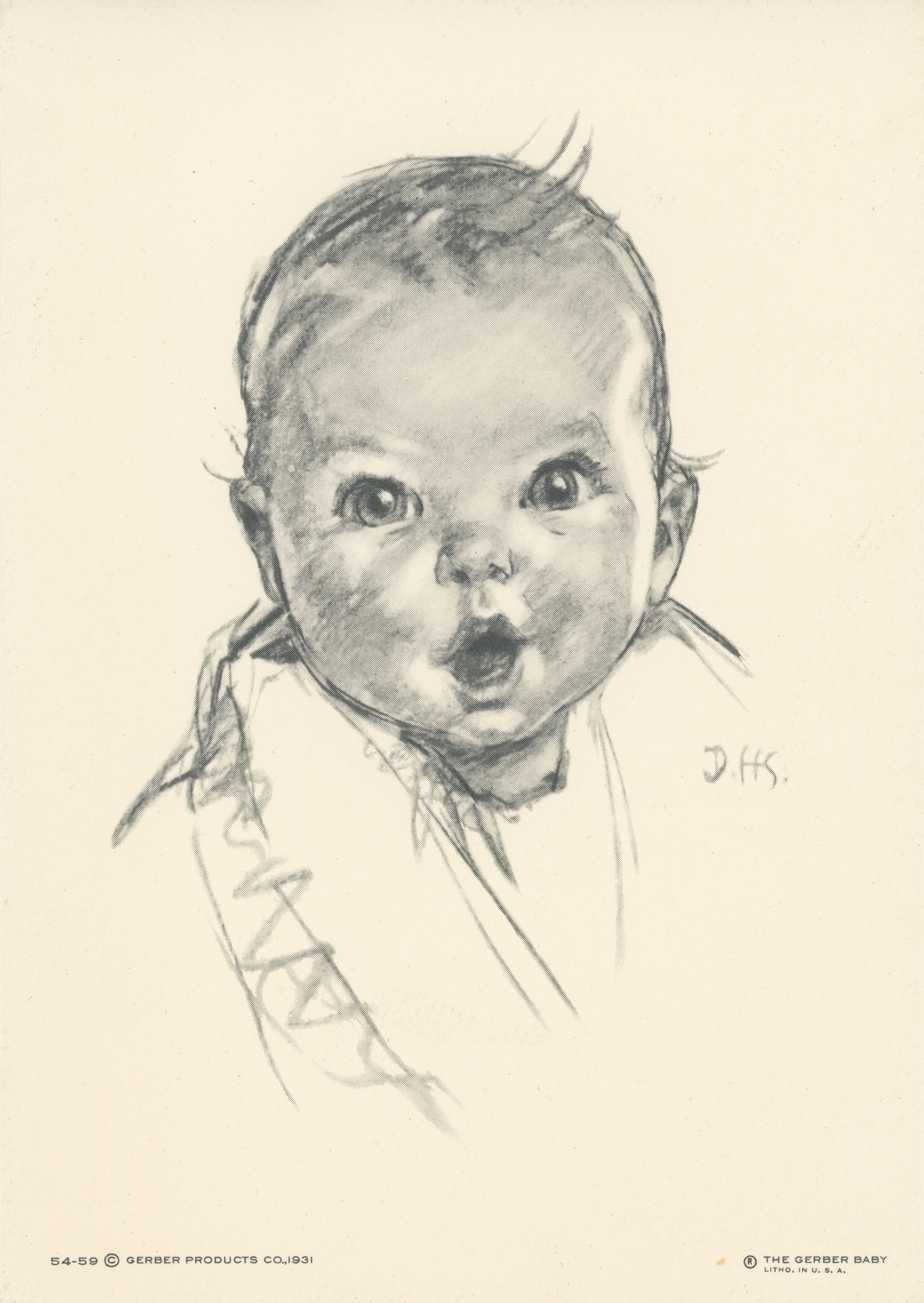
1931 lithograph of the Gerber Baby by Dorothy Hope Smith

The Gerber Baby is the trademark logo of the Gerber Products Company, an American purveyor of baby food and baby products. Drawn by artist Dorothy Hope Smith, the Gerber Baby was modeled after Ann Turner Cook (1926–2022).

== History ==
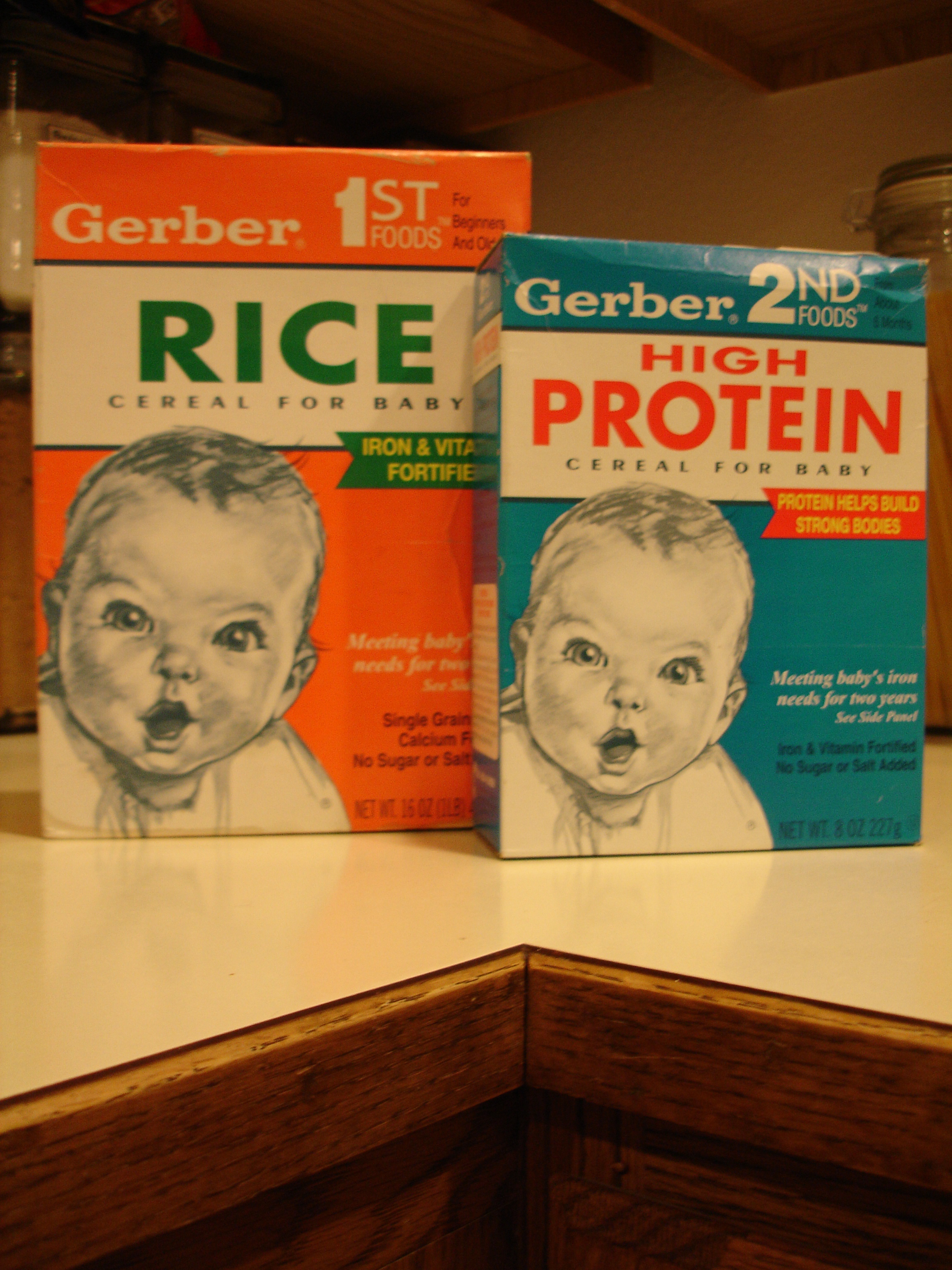
Sketch of the Gerber Baby on product packaging

Fremont Canning Company, owned and operated by Dan Gerber, was looking for a baby face for its new baby food campaign, which was to start in the later part of 1928. To find a baby face that it believed would best represent the new baby food, the Fremont Canning Company conducted a contest in the summer of 1928. Many drawings and paintings were submitted. Some were elaborate baby portraits in oil paint, while others were simple sketches.

Dorothy Hope Smith of Westport, Connecticut, an artist specialising in children's drawings, submitted an unfinished charcoal drawing, that was closer to a simple sketch than a professional drawing. Smith told the judges that, if the sketch were selected as the winner, she would finish it professionally. The drawing won but, to her surprise, the judges wanted no changes to it.

In 1928, the “Gerber Baby” symbol was introduced to help identify the new product. It was first used in a baby food advertisement in the magazine Good Housekeeping. Within sixty days, Gerber Strained Foods, using the “Gerber Baby” symbol, had gained national recognition, being distributed to various places throughout the United States. It became internationally recognized.

The campaign encouraged mothers of newborns to participate directly in a coupon redemption program. The introductory offer gave each consumer six cans of the canning company's soup and strained vegetables for a dollar in exchange for the name of a favorite grocer.

The idea was to stress the nutritional value of Gerber's baby foods and the time and money saving advantages over buying by prescription. The sketch was so popular that it became the Fremont Canning Company's official trademark in 1931. The Gerber Baby has since appeared on all Gerber packaging and in every Gerber advertisement. The Fremont Canning Company changed its name to Gerber Products Company in 1941.

The model for Smith's original sketch, Ann Turner Cook (1926–2022) grew up to be a mystery novelist and English teacher. Although she avoided publicity for many years, Cook more recently granted interviews to several Florida newspapers. In the beginning of 2011, the company was in the process of looking for the next Gerber Baby. It eventually chose a toddler named Mercy Townsend.

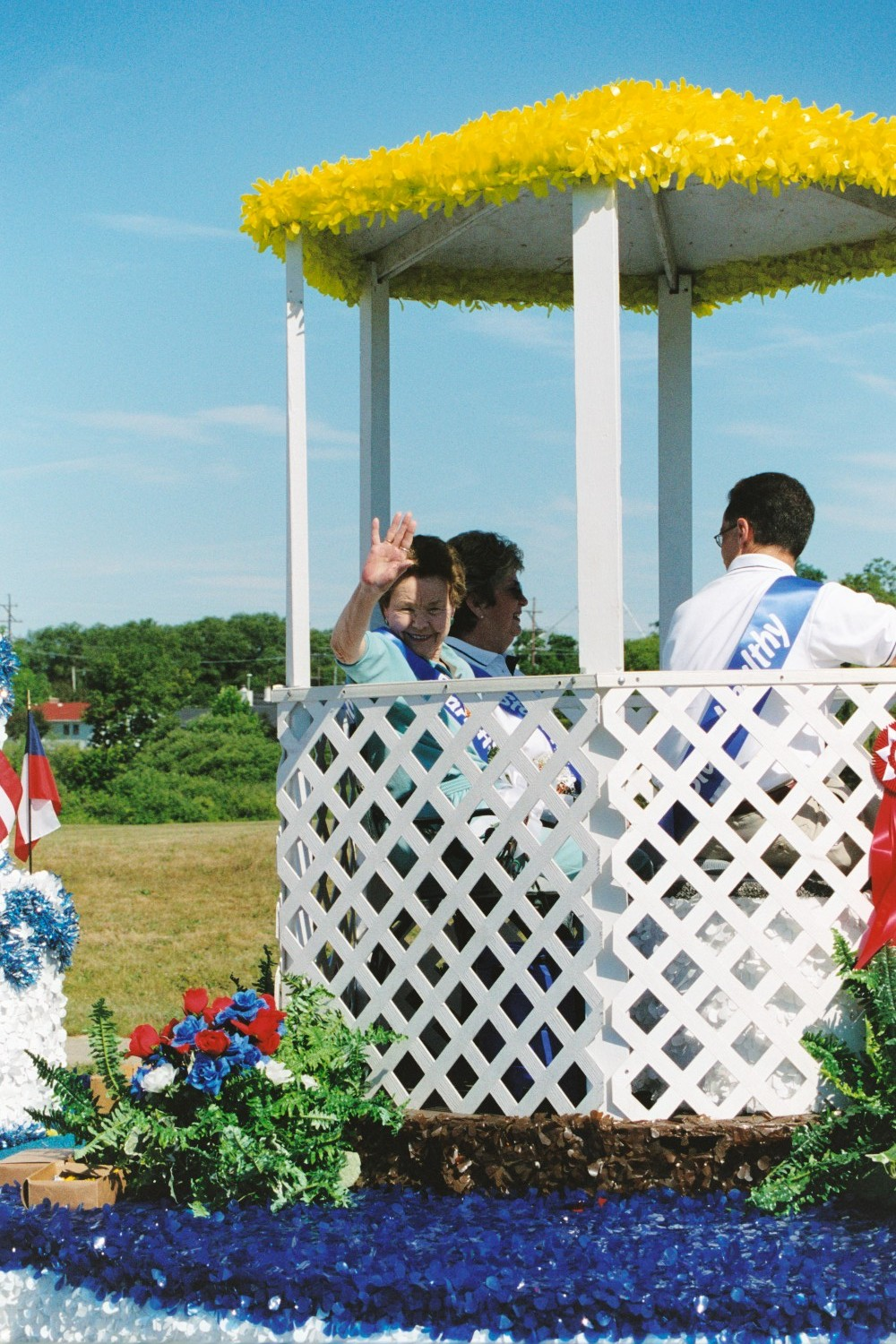
Ann Turner Cook, the original model for the Gerber Baby, seen at the National Baby Food Festival parade in Fremont, Michigan, in 2003

Earlier, one poll conducted in the United States showed that many people thought that the Gerber Baby became someone famous, such as Humphrey Bogart, Elizabeth Taylor, or Ernest Borgnine. The trademark of the Gerber Baby has been shown by the United States public to be associated with the highest consumer loyalty, according to one survey in 1998.

Of note, in the beginning of February 2018, Gerber selected a baby affected by Down syndrome for its advertising campaign, and received praise and appreciation from many sources. In 2020, for the first time, Gerber chose an adopted baby as the face of their campaign. In 2022, Gerber chose a baby born with a limb difference, and matched the $25,000 cash prize with a donation to March of Dimes.

== Gerber Baby Photo Contest winners ==
Gerber Baby Photo Contest winners
Year	Baby's name	Baby's age	Hometown	Prize	Distinction	Reference
2026	Cameron Chung	11 months old	Minnesota	$50,000	2025 Gerber Baby Photo Contest skipped.	
2024	Akil "Sonny" McLeod	1 year old	Goodyear, AZ	$25,000		
2023	Madison Mendoza	10 months	Colorado	$25,000		
2022	Isa Slish	7 months	Edmond, OK	$25,000	First Spokesbaby to have a limb difference, selected from 225,000 entries	
2021	Zane Kahin	5 months	Winter Park, FL	$25,000	First Spokesbaby to be named Chief Growing Officer	
2020	Magnolia Earl	1 year old	Ross, CA	$25,000	First Spokesbaby to be adopted, selected from 327,000 entries	
2019	Kairi Yang	1 year old	Hickory, NC	$50,000	First Spokesbaby of Hmong descent, selected from 544,000 entries	
2018	Lucas Warren	1 year old	Dalton, GA	$50,000	First Spokesbaby with Down syndrome, selected from 140,000 entries	
2017	Riley Shines	7 months	Columbus, OH	$50,000	Selected from 110,000 entries	
2016	Isla Welch	7 months	Troy, MI	$50,000	Selected from 170,000 entries	
2015	Grace Pfautz	7 months	East Petersburg, PA	$50,000	Selected from 180,000 entries	
2014	Levi & Paxton Strickland	10 months	Wernersville, PA	$50,000	First Spokesbabies who are twins, selected from 156,000 entries	
2013	Mary Jane Montoya	8 months	Fresno, CA	$50,000	Selected from 300,000 entries	
2012	Tate Rosendahl	11 months	Springfield, MO	$50,000 scholarship	Selected from 156,000 applications	
2011	Mercy Townsend	2 years old	Toledo, OH	$25,000 scholarship	Selected from 217,000 applications	

== Sources ==
- Avakian, Arlene Voski et al., From Betty Crocker to Feminist Food Studies, Liverpool University Press (2005), ISBN 1-55849-511-8
- Belasco, Warren James, Food Nations, Routledge (2002), ISBN 0-415-93076-6
- Heim, Michael, Exploring America's Highways, Exploring America's Highway (2004), ISBN 0-9744358-2-1
- Ingham, John N., Biographical Dictionary of American Business Leaders: A-G, Greenwood Publishing Group (1983), ISBN 0-313-23907-X
