= Bill Blackbeard =

American writer-editor and comic strip collector (1926–2011)

- Bill Blackbeard in 1971
- Born: William Elsworth Blackbeard; April 28, 1926; Lawrence, Indiana, U.S.
- Died: March 10, 2011 (aged 84); Watsonville, California, U.S.
- Education: Fullerton College
- Occupations: Writer, editor
- Known for: San Francisco Academy of Comic Art
- Notable work: The Smithsonian Collection of Newspaper Comics
- Spouse: Barbara (m. 1966–2011)
- Awards: Eisner Award, 2004

William Elsworth Blackbeard (April 28, 1926 – March 10, 2011), better known as Bill Blackbeard, was a writer-editor and the founder-director of the San Francisco Academy of Comic Art, a comprehensive collection of comic strips and cartoon art from American newspapers. This major collection, consisting of 2.5 million clippings, tearsheets and comic sections, spanning the years 1894 to 1996, has provided source material for numerous books and articles by Blackbeard and other researchers.

== Biography ==
Born in Lawrence, Indiana, Blackbeard spent his childhood in this rural town northeast of Indianapolis. His grandfather ran a service station; his father, Sydney Blackbeard, was an electrician, and his mother, Thelma, handled the bookkeeping for Sydney's business. When he was eight or nine, the family moved to Newport Beach, California, where he attended high school.

During World War II, Blackbeard served with the 89th Cavalry Reconnaissance Squad, 9th Army, in France, Belgium and Germany. In the post-war years, he went to Fullerton College on the G.I. Bill, studying history, English and American literature. He also worked on the staff of the Torch, the college yearbook.

== Books ==
The Smithsonian Collection of Newspaper Comics

Blackbeard vigorously defended comic strips as worthy of study. "The comic strip is the only wholly indigenous American art form. . . . Only the tasteless and uninformed consider comic art trivial." He described comic books, by contrast, as "meretricious dreck," which may have marginalized him in the broader field of comic art.

As a freelance writer, Blackbeard wrote, edited or contributed to more than 200 books on cartoons and comic strips, including 100 Years of Comic Strips, the Krazy & Ignatz series (Eclipse/Fantagraphics) and NBM's 18-volume Wash Tubbs and Captain Easy. His contributions to various magazines has been documented by illustrator John Adcock, who commented:

When Bill Blackbeard began chronicling the comic strip there was no appreciation of comic strips by academics and institutions. Comics were still an untouchable subject for adults. The study of comic strips was considered to be the domain of morons and illiterates. Most critical articles on the comics, as Bill noted more than once, appeared in the lowly form of the zine, with low distribution and a small readership. Bill Blackbeard considered the best of the comic strips to be the equal of great art, cinema and literature, and spent his highly productive life trying to convince the world that the subject was worthy of their attention.

In 1977, Blackbeard and the jazz critic Martin Williams collaborated on The Smithsonian Collection of Newspaper Comics, regarded by the comics community as a major work in the field because it provides an authoritative overview of the 20th century's leading strips.

== San Francisco Academy of Comic Art ==
Finding that libraries were discarding bound newspapers after microfilming, Blackbeard established the San Francisco Academy of Comic Art in 1968 as a non-profit organization and began collecting newspapers from California libraries, expanding his scope to institutions nationwide. Blackbeard and his wife Barbara, married in 1966, were forced out of several San Francisco addresses by the growth of Bill's collections. The Academy found its longest lasting home in a Spanish stucco home at 2850 Ulloa Street in San Francisco's quiet residential Sunset district. The scope of this collection was detailed by Jeet Heer:

In the early 1960s, Blackbeard, then a middle-aged World War II vet and pulp fiction enthusiast, noted that local libraries were microfilming their newspaper collections and throwing away the paper versions, on the grounds that the paper copies took up too much space and were going to crumble quickly. Blackbeard immediately understood the dangers this presented to anyone interested in using newspapers as a source and in particular how this would make it impossible to preserve the history of comic strips. A newspaper tearsheet for a comic strip could be reprinted and give readers a good idea of what the strip looked like, something that was impossible from microfilm. Blackbeard asked his local library if he could have the newspapers they were throwing away. He was told that as a private citizen he wouldn’t be allowed to but they could be donated to an institution. Blackbeard’s solution was to make himself into an institution, becoming the Founder-Director of the San Francisco Academy of Comics Art in 1968. Newly incorporated, Blackbeard was in a position to save and salvage as many newspapers as he could get his hands on before they were sent to the rubbish pile. Working with a strong network of comics fans, he got the word out to libraries all across North America that the San Francisco Academy of Comics Art was where they should send those large bound volumes of newspapers. Blackbeard’s network included two retired bus drivers (Gale Paulson and George Cushing) who criss-crossed the continent on Ryder Trucks (loaned from another friend) packed to the gills with yellowing newsprint.

During three decades of acquisition, Blackbeard accumulated 75 tons of material, which filled both the upstairs rooms and the ground-floor garage. In 1997, he learned that the owner of the home was not going to renew his lease, necessitating a new location for the SFACA collection.

Blackbeard then entered into negotiations with Lucy Shelton Caswell, curator of Ohio State University's Billy Ireland Cartoon Library & Museum (then known as the Cartoon Research Library). In January 1998, six semi-trailer trucks moved the collection from California to Ohio. The Billy Ireland Cartoon Library & Museum offered this description of Blackbeard's collection:

Materials in the collection include clipped comic strips, single comic pages, complete Sunday comic sections, and entire newspapers. The focus of the first two years of work on this collection, supported by grants from the Getty Foundation, the Scripps Howard Foundation and the Charles D. Farber Memorial Foundation, has been to establish a chronological run of each comic feature, either by amassing a group of clippings, or by identifying each feature's location in the collection of Sunday comic sections. The distinction between comic clippings and comic sections is significant. The collector's original intent was to establish a complete run, from beginning to end, of every comic feature to have appeared in an American newspaper. In most cases, this meant clipping examples of each feature from various newspapers, for two reasons. First, no single newspaper could have run every comic feature. Second, any given newspaper might print a feature for a certain length of time, and then drop it, either temporarily or permanently. Newspaper strikes and mail strikes could also interfere with the continuous run of a feature in a given publication. However, some features were never clipped from the original comic sections in which they appeared. The collector recognized that many of the early comic sections, dating from the 1890s to the 1920s, were extremely rare, and should be kept intact. In addition to the comic art they contain, many feature elaborate headers, marginal illustrations and illustrated advertisements, all forming part of the overall design of the publication.

== Double Fold ==
It was Blackbeard who told Nicholson Baker about "fraudulent" studies used by libraries to justify their massive destruction of books and newspapers, information documented by Baker in his book Double Fold: Libraries and the Assault on Paper (2001), a National Book Critics Circle Award Winner. Baker, who devoted the preface of that book to his discussions with Blackbeard, later commented:

The thing about Blackbeard—he is like so many collectors in that he saved something terribly important, but he was single-minded: he saved things with a razor. He had no interest in the women’s sections, in the magazine sections, in the beautiful photographs that had nothing to do with comics.

According to Billy Ireland Cartoon Library & Museum curator Jenny E. Robb, Blackbeard left bound volumes intact in later years.

== Later life and death ==
After he sold the collection to Ohio State in 1997, Blackbeard moved from San Francisco to Santa Cruz, California, where his wife liked to surf. He continued to contribute to books and indulge his interests, in addition to comic strips, in pulp magazines, old films and penny dreadfuls.

Blackbeard died on March 10, 2011, in Watsonville, California; he was 84.

== Awards ==
Blackbeard received a 2004 Eisner Award for Krazy & Ignatz, the archival series of Krazy Kat Sunday pages that included additional work and biographical information on George Herriman.

== See also ==
- List of newspaper comic strips

== Sources ==
- Comic Book Awards Almanac
