= Baby Food Festival =

American festival in Fremont, Michigan

National Baby Food Festival
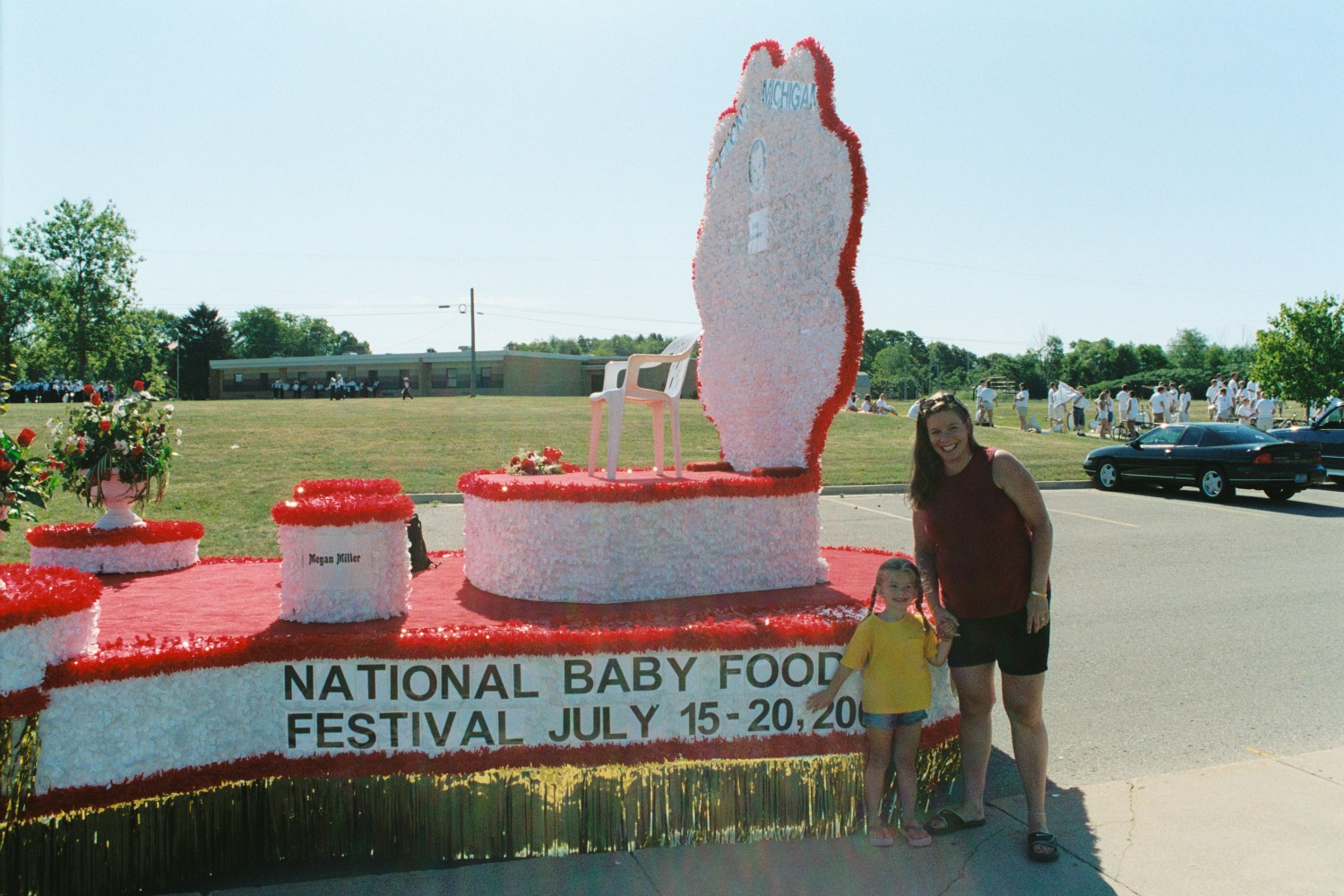
- parade float for the Baby Food Queen, pictured in 2003
- Status: Active
- Frequency: Annually
- Location: Fremont, Michigan
- Country: United States
- Years active: 1991–present
- Website: fremontcommerce.com/national-baby-food-festival

43°28′0″N 85°56′54″W

The National Baby Food Festival is an annual community festival in Fremont, Michigan, United States. It is held in mid-July near the Gerber Products Company, a Nestlé company that manufactures baby food. Established in 1951 as the Old Fashioned Days, it was changed to National Baby Food Festival in 1990.

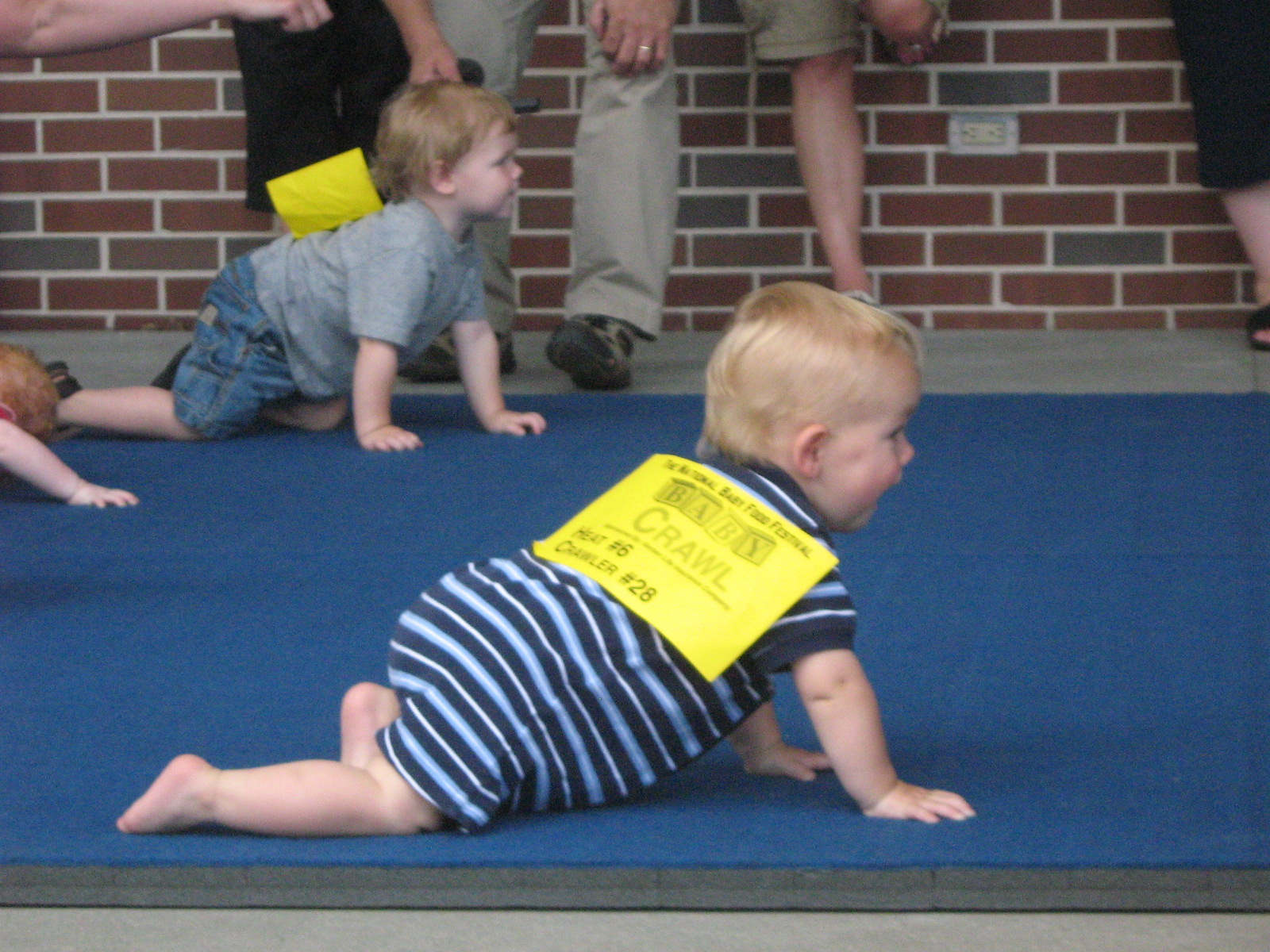
A competitor in the annual crawling contest at the National Baby Food Festival

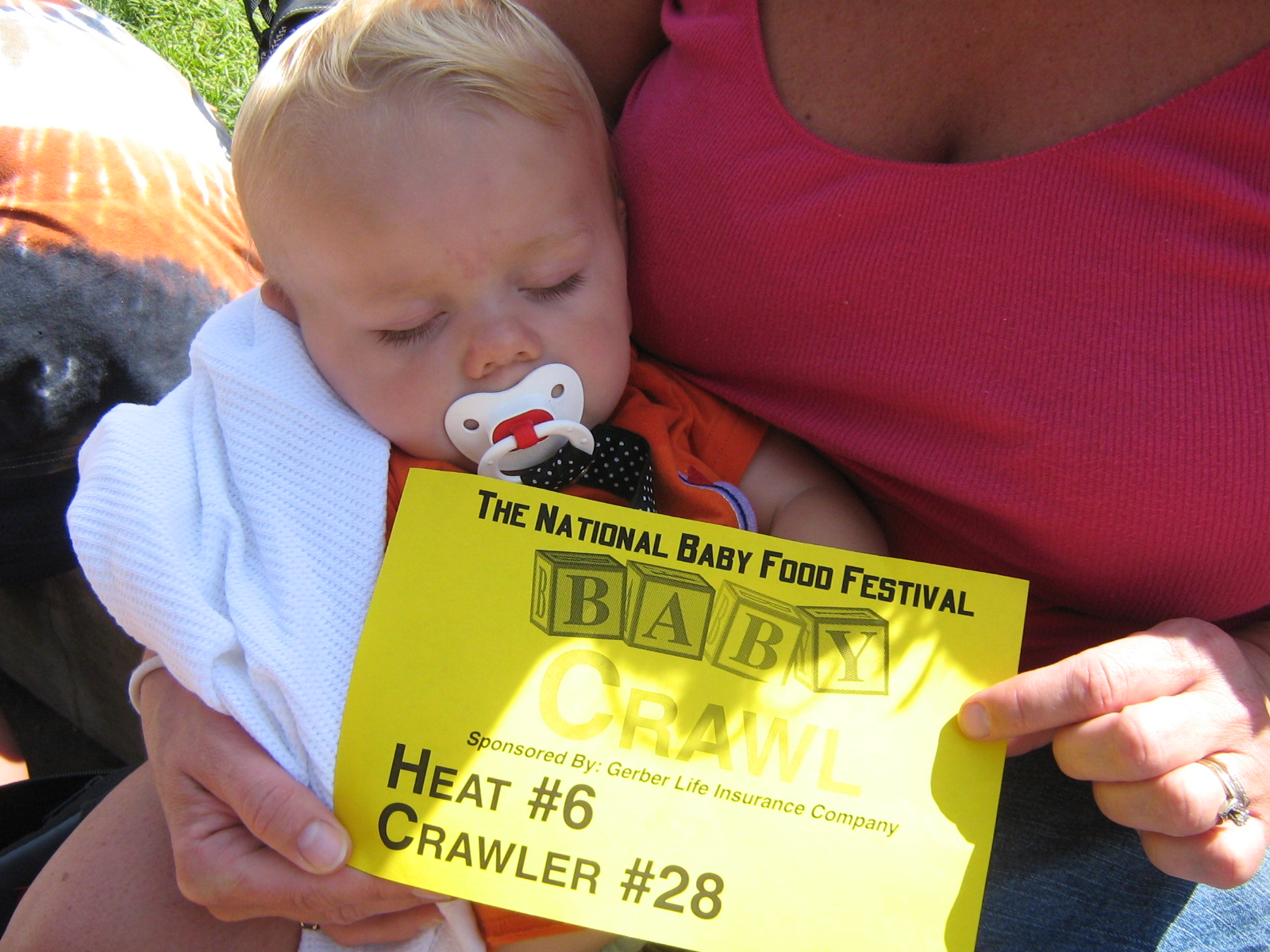
The tired crawler sleeping after his race

== History ==
In 1951, the Old Fashioned Days festival was first held in Fremont, Michigan, with visitors partaking in historical fashion and culture of "the horse and buggy days". The festival featured "roving accordionists", a parade, and tours of the Gerber Baby Food Company. Each year, the Old Fashioned Days honored a couple that had been married for at least 50 years as the annual "king and queen". It reached 60,000 visitors in 1962. In 1990, the Old Fashioned Days was changed to the National Baby Food Festival to celebrate the city's status as the home of Gerber.

It went virtual in 2020 before resuming the next year.

== Festivities and operations ==
The festival draws as many as 100,000 people to Fremont, a town of about 4600. The three-day event includes live music performances, carnival rides, children's events, games, entertainment, markets and exhibitions. The parade including custom vehicles and antique cars is often included.

Part of the celebration includes the selection of a festival queen from the local area. Pageant winners receive scholarships and prizes, and are asked to represent the festival and locale at noteworthy events.

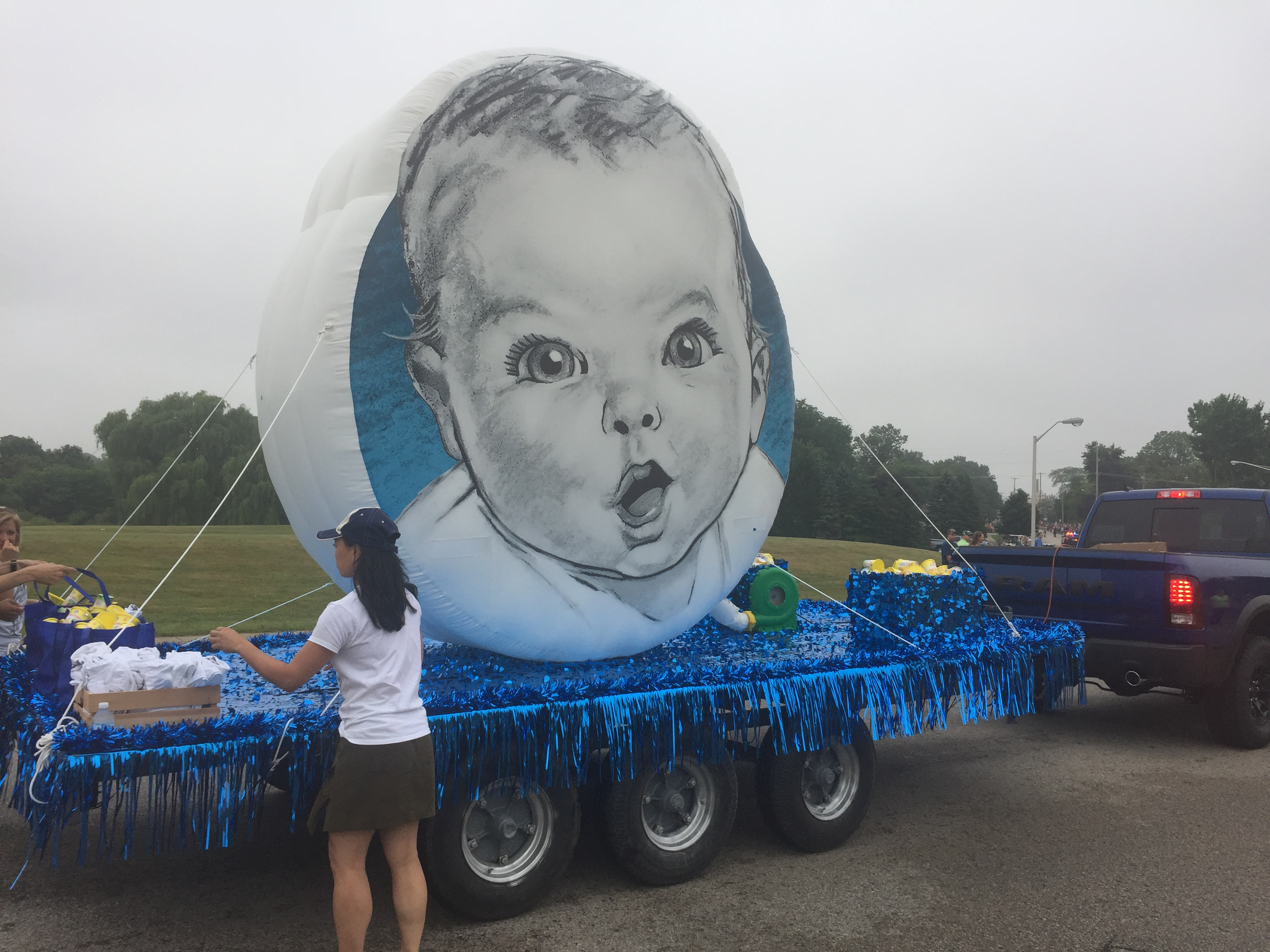
Volunteers prepare a float featuring the Gerber baby for the Baby Food Festival's annual parade in 2017.

There was a virtual festival in 2020.
