= Wash Tubbs =

American comic strip (1924–1949)

- Roy Crane strips from 1937–38 as reprinted in the Dell Four-Color Wash Tubbs #11.
- Author: Roy Crane; Leslie Turner (1943–1949)
- Current status/schedule: Concluded daily & Sunday strip
- Launch date: April 14, 1924
- End date: 1949; folded into Captain Easy
- Alternate name: Washington Tubbs II
- Syndicate(s): Newspaper Enterprise Association
- Publisher(s): Big Little Books; Dell Comics; NBM Publishing; Fantagraphics Books
- Genre(s): Gag-a-day, then Adventure
- Followed by: Captain Easy

Wash Tubbs is an American daily comic strip created by Roy Crane that ran from April 14, 1924 to 1949, when it merged into Crane's related Sunday page, Captain Easy. Crane left both strips in 1943 to begin Buz Sawyer, but a series of assistants, beginning with Leslie Turner, kept the combined Captain Easy daily and Sunday strips going until October 1, 1988.

== History ==
Initially titled Washington Tubbs II, it originally was a gag-a-day daily strip which focused on the mundane misadventures of the title character, a bespectacled bumbler who ran a store. However, Crane soon switched from gag-a-day to continuity storylines. He reinvented the strip after its 12th week to make it the first true action/adventure comic strip, initially by having Tubbs leave the store and join a circus. To research this, Crane spent many days with a circus, even incorporating characters in the strip based directly on the circus performers he knew personally.

Wash was a girl-crazy zany, and his character never truly changed even as the strip changed around him. After a Polynesian treasure hunt in which Wash made and lost a fortune, adventures followed in which he fell afoul of his arch-enemy, Bull Dawson, who reappeared throughout the series. Since the short Wash was not a fighter, Crane tried out several scrappier sidekicks until May 6, 1929, when he introduced Captain Easy, a tough, taciturn Southerner with a mysterious past. Easy gradually took over the strip and became its lead character, getting his own Sunday page, Captain Easy, Soldier of Fortune, starting July 30, 1933. Wash continued to appear as a supporting character, but he became steadily less important during the 1940s.

The Tubbs and Easy characters were owned by the Newspaper Enterprise Association syndicate. Crane left that syndicate and abandoned the strips in 1943 to begin Buz Sawyer, a strip he would own outright. Crane's last daily Wash Tubbs strip ran on May 29, 1943.

After Crane’s departure, control of the strip then passed to Crane’s assistant, Leslie Turner, who had ghosted on the daily strip since 1937. Turner's assistant Walt Scott drew the Sunday page. Easy was in the Army by that time, and Tubbs had an increasingly unimportant role, so both daily and Sunday strips displayed the name Captain Easy in 1949 (with Wash Tubbs fading away).

Scott drew the Sunday strip until 1952, when Turner took it over with inks by assistant Bill Crooks. Mel Graff began ghosting the Sunday page in 1960. Turner continued to draw the daily strip until he retired in 1969, with his last credited daily strip running January 17, 1970.

Following Turner's departure, the strips passed to his assistants, Bill Crooks (art) and Jim Lawrence (story). The pair produced both the daily and Sunday strips from January 19, 1970 to May 23, 1981. The Sunday page ended on March 29, 1981. Mick Casale joined as the new writer, and he and Crooks produced the daily strip until it was discontinued on October 1, 1988.

Wash remained a supporting character in Leslie Turner's Captain Easy (February 29, 1964)

== Wash Tubbs toppers ==
Starting February 27, 1927, a Wash Tubbs-themed topper, or subsidiary strip, appeared over the Sunday page of J. R. Williams' Out Our Way with the Willets Sunday strip. Originally an extension of the gag-a-day comic strip, the topper shifted focus to become A Wash Tubbs Game from September 4, 1932 to January 29, 1933. After this, the comic strip returned for a few weeks, and then became Wash Tubbs Comical Jigsaw Puzzle from March 19 to May 7, 1933. The topper was then turned into a children's craft-ideas panel called Goofy-Ginks, and ran until September 24, 1933.

== Books ==
Wash Tubbs and Captain Easy were featured in Big Little Books during the 1930s. They also appeared in Dell comic books from 1936 (Captain Easy, as early as The Funnies #1, October 1936 cover date) and 1937 (Wash Tubbs, as early as The Comics #1, March 1937 cover date) into the 1940s.

Roy Crane's Wash Tubbs – The First Adventure Comic Strip. New York: Luna Press. 1974. — co-assembled by Jim Ivey with Gordon Campbell and featuring a foreword by Charles M. Schulz

The entire 1924–43 run of Crane’s strip was reprinted in Wash Tubbs and Captain Easy, an 18-volume series with biographical and historical commentary by Bill Blackbeard and design by Bhob Stewart. This series was published by NBM Publishing on a quarterly schedule from 1987 to 1992.

Between 2010 and 2013, Fantagraphics Books printed a series of four hardback books reprinting Roy Crane's complete run of Captain Easy Sunday pages from 1933-1943.

Fantagraphics also published The Best of Captain Easy And Wash Tubbs in 2015—a collection of ten selected daily strip adventure continuities drawn by Roy Crane ranging from 1928 to 1935.
