= National Register of Historic Places listings in Robertson County, Texas =

Location of Robertson County in Texas

This is a list of the National Register of Historic Places listings in Robertson County, Texas.

This is intended to be a complete list of properties and districts listed on the National Register of Historic Places in Robertson County, Texas. There are one district and four individual properties listed on the National Register in the county. One individually listed property is a State Antiquities Landmark and contains within it a Recorded Texas Historic Landmark (RTHL). The remaining three individually listed properties are each also RTHLs while the district holds several more.

This National Park Service list is complete through NPS recent listings posted March 21, 2025.

== Current listings ==
The locations of National Register properties and districts may be seen in a mapping service provided.

	Name on the Register	Image	Date listed	Location	City or town	Description
1	Robert C. Allen House	Robert C. Allen House	August 11, 1982 (#82004521)	402 Cedar St. 30°52′44″N 96°35′45″W	Hearne	Recorded Texas Historic Landmark
2	Calvert Historic District	Calvert Historic District	April 3, 1978 (#78002978)	Roughly bounded by Main, Garritt, Pin Oak, Maple, and Barton Sts. 30°58′48″N 96°40′16″W	Calvert	Includes Recorded Texas Historic Landmarks
3	Franklin Carnegie Library	Franklin Carnegie Library	November 25, 2005 (#05001337)	315 East Decherd; 31°01′38″N 96°29′03″W	Franklin	Recorded Texas Historic Landmark
4	Hammond House	Hammond House	October 28, 1970 (#70000759)	Bounded by Burnet, China, Elm, and Hanna Sts. 30°58′51″N 96°40′13″W	Calvert	Recorded Texas Historic Landmark; part of Calvert Historic District
5	Robertson County Courthouse and Jail	Robertson County Courthouse and Jail	December 22, 1977 (#77001472)	Public Sq. 31°01′37″N 96°29′14″W	Franklin	State Antiquities Landmark, includes Recorded Texas Historic Landmark

== See also ==
- National Register of Historic Places listings in Texas
- Recorded Texas Historic Landmarks in Robertson County
