= Calvert High School (Texas) =

Public school in Texas, United States

Location
- 310 Hickory St. Calvert, Texas 77837-0007; United States; 30.9845°N 96.16644°W

Information
- School type: Public high school
- School district: Calvert Independent School District
- Principal: Thomas Kelly
- Staff: 18.00 (on an FTE basis)
- Grades: PK-12
- Enrollment: 147 (2023–24)
- Student to teacher ratio: 8.17
- Colors: Purple & White
- Athletics conference: UIL Class A
- Mascot: Trojan
- Website: Calvert High School

Calvert High School is a public high school located in the city of Calvert, Texas, USA and classified as a 1A school by the UIL. It is a part of the Calvert Independent School District located in southeastern Robertson County. In 2015, the school was rated "Improvement Required" by the Texas Education Agency.

== Athletics ==
The Calvert Trojans compete in these sports -

Volleyball, Cross Country, 6-Man Football, Basketball & Track

=== State titles ===
- Boys Basketball -
  - 2012(1A/D2)
- Football -
  - 2002(6M)
- Boys Track -
  - 1992(1A)

==== State finalist ====
- Girls Basketball -
  - 2014(1A/D2)
