= Hammond House (Calvert, Texas) =

- U.S. National Register of Historic Places
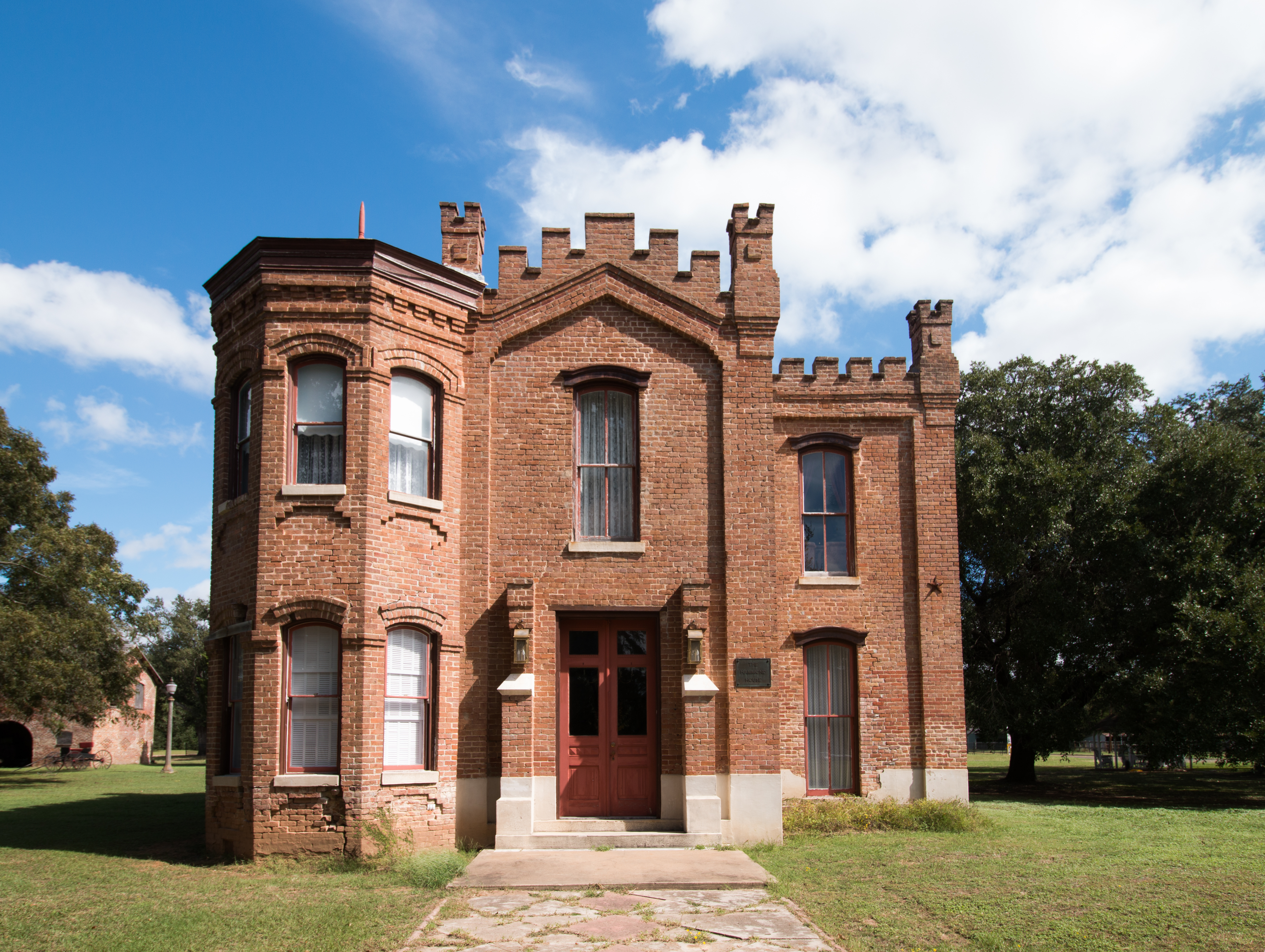

- Location within Texas
- Location: Bounded by Burnet, China, Elm, and Hanna Sts., Calvert, Texas
- Coordinates: 30°58′51″N 96°40′13″W
- Area: 2.7 acres (1.1 ha)
- Built: 1875
- Architect: W.T. Ingraham
- Architectural style: Gothic Revival
- Part of: Calvert Historic District
- NRHP reference No.: 70000759
- Added to NRHP: October 28, 1970

The Hammond House in Calvert, Texas is a two-story Gothic Revival-style building built in 1875. It was listed on the National Register of Historic Places in 1970. It is also included in the National Register-listed Calvert Historic District. The listing includes two contributing buildings.

It was designed by St. Louis architect W.T. Ingraham and has a crenellated parapet.

It is a Recorded Texas Historic Landmark.

It was built to serve as the county jail of Robertson County, Texas, but within three years, the county seat was moved to Franklin and a new jail was built there. The property was then purchased by Andrew Faulkner who converted it into a hotel. The building was documented by the Historic American Buildings Survey. A set of measured drawings was prepared.
