= Robert Calvert (disambiguation) =

Robert Calvert (1945–1988) was a South African-born English musician and writer.

Robert Calvert may also refer to:

- Robert Calvert (Texas pioneer) (1802 - 1867) American plantation owner, judge, and politician
- Robert Calvert (saxophonist), English saxophonist
- Robert S. Calvert (1892–1981), Texas comptroller, 1949–1975
- Robert W. Calvert (1905–1994), Texas politician and judge
