= List of people from Abilene, Texas =

The following people were all born in, residents of, or otherwise closely associated with the American city of Abilene, Texas.

== A–L ==
- Coby Archa, contestant on reality competition television series Survivor: Palau
- Alvin O. Austin (born 1942), administrator at Hardin–Simmons University
- Brown Bannister (born 1951), music producer; winner of numerous Dove Awards; Abilene Christian University alumnus
- Sammy Baugh (1914–2008), football coach at Hardin–Simmons University
- Ken Baumann (born 1989), actor
- Ray Berry (born 1963), linebacker who played for the Minnesota Vikings and the Seattle Seahawks
- Gordon Bethune (born 1941), chief executive officer, Continental Airlines; Abilene Christian University alumnus
- Marion Zimmer Bradley (1930–1999), fantasy writer; works include The Mists of Avalon and the Darkover series; Hardin–Simmons University alumnus
- Doyle Brunson (1933–2023), championship-level poker player; author; Hardin–Simmons University alumnus
- Melinda Plowman (born 1941), actress
- Chris Christian (born 1955), music producer; artist; songwriter for Elvis Presley, The Carpenters, Amy Grant, Ali Lohan, The Pointer Sisters, Al Jarreau; Vice Chairman/Managing Partner of Dallas Wings WNBA
- Karen Christy (born 1951), model; Playboy magazine's Playmate of the Month; Abilene native
- Isaac Cline (1861–1955), meteorologist; resident of Abilene
- Randall "Tex" Cobb (born 1950), prizefighter; actor; Abilene native
- Charles Coody (born 1937), professional golfer; twelve PGA Tour victories; one Masters Tournament victory; Abilene resident
- Byron Cook (born 1954), Republican state representative for Navarro
- Carole Cook (1924–2023), actress; protégé of Lucille Ball; Abilene native
- Roy Crane (1901–1977), cartoonist; creator, Wash Tubbs, Captain Easy, and Buz Sawyer; Abilene native
- Sonny Cumbie (born 1981), quarterback for the Los Angeles Avengers of the Arena Football League; Abilene native
- Bonnie Curtis (born 1966), film producer; work includes Saving Private Ryan, A.I., and Minority Report; Abilene Christian University alumnus
- Jody Dean (born 1959), news anchor of KTVT, Dallas; Abilene Christian University alumnus
- Shae D'lyn (born 1963), actress; work includes appearing as Jane Deaux in the television sitcom Dharma & Greg; Abilene native
- Holly Dunn (born 1957), country music singer-songwriter; Abilene Christian University alumnus
- Novalyne Price Ellis (1908–1999), schoolteacher in Cross Plains, Texas; member of the National Forensic Hall of Fame; memoirist
- Billie Sol Estes (1925–2013), financier; has accused Lyndon B. Johnson of a variety of crimes; Abilene native
- Bob Estes (born 1966), American professional golfer; from Graham, Texas
- Mark I. Fox (born 1956), Vice Admiral, U.S. Navy; Deputy Commander, United States Central Command; Deputy Assistant to the President and Director, White House Military Office; Abilene native
- David Funderburk (born 1944), U.S. Ambassador to Romania (1981–1985); member, United States House of Representatives from North Carolina's 2nd congressional district (1995–1997); former professor, Hardin–Simmons University
- Larry Gatlin (born 1948), actor; singer-songwriter
- Stedman Graham (born 1951), businessman; motivational speaker; romantically linked with Oprah Winfrey; Hardin–Simmons University basketball player
- Carol Hall (1936–2018), composer and lyricist; work includes The Best Little Whorehouse in Texas
- Lou Henson (1932–2020), college basketball coach whose lengthy coaching career included four seasons at Hardin–Simmons University
- Case Keenum (born 1988), former quarterback for University of Houston; quarterback for the Houston Texans (2012–2014), St. Louis/Los Angeles Rams (2014–2016), Minnesota Vikings (2017), and the Denver Broncos (2018–present)
- Lonnie D. Kliever (c. 1931–2004), professor of religious studies; Hardin–Simmons University alumnus
- John Lackey (born 1978), Major League Baseball pitcher for the Anaheim Angels (2002–2009), [Boston Red Sox] (2010–2014), St. Louis Cardinals (2014–2015), and the World Champion Chicago Cubs (2016–present); played in and won the 2002, 2013, and 2016 World Series
- Deirdre Lovejoy (born 1962), actress; work includes The Talented Mr. Ripley
- Max Lucado (born 1955), Christian author, preacher and broadcaster; Abilene Christian University alumnus

== M–Z ==
- Ed V. Mead (1921–1983), 17th Lieutenant Governor of New Mexico
- Wayne Millner (1913–1976), Hardin–Simmons University football coach; professional football wide receiver; member, Pro Football Hall of Fame
- Paige Moss (born 1973), actress; work includes Buffy the Vampire Slayer and Beverly Hills, 90210
- Ty O'Neal, actor; member, Professional Rodeo Cowboys Association
- Terry Orr, Tight End/H-Back for the Washington Redskins
- Caryl Mack Parker, country music singer-songwriter
- Fess Parker, actor; work includes appearing as title character of the television series Daniel Boone; Hardin–Simmons University alumnus
- Lee Roy Parnell, country musician
- Paige Patterson, Southern Baptist theologian; seminary president; Hardin–Simmons University alumnus
- Vinnie Paul, drummer and co-founder of heavy metal band Pantera
- Don Pierson, businessman; founder, Wonderful Radio London and Swinging Radio England radio stations; longtime Abilene resident; Hardin–Simmons University alumnus
- Dominic Rhodes, running back for the Indianapolis Colts
- Sid W. Richardson, oilman; cattleman; philanthropist; Simmons College (now Hardin–Simmons University) alumnus
- Bill Sharman, Hall of Fame basketball player, coach, and executive
- Jessica Simpson (born 1980), pop singer; actress
- Justin Snow, long snapper for the Indianapolis Colts
- Diane Stanley, children's book author
- Rawson Stovall (born 1972), first nationally syndicated video game journalist in the U.S.
- Steven Stucky, Pulitzer Prize-winning composer
- Hollis Thomas, National Football League defensive tackle
- Reverend L.T. Thomas, preacher and artist
- Jeanette Tillett, composer
- Bulldog Turner, Pro Football Hall of Fame defensive back; Hardin–Simmons University alumnus
- Sarah Weddington, attorney; represented "Jane Roe" in the Roe v. Wade legal case before the United States Supreme Court; Abilene native
- Duane Whitaker, actor; work includes The Devil's Rejects

== See also ==
- List of people from Texas
