= John Lackey =

American baseball player (born 1978)

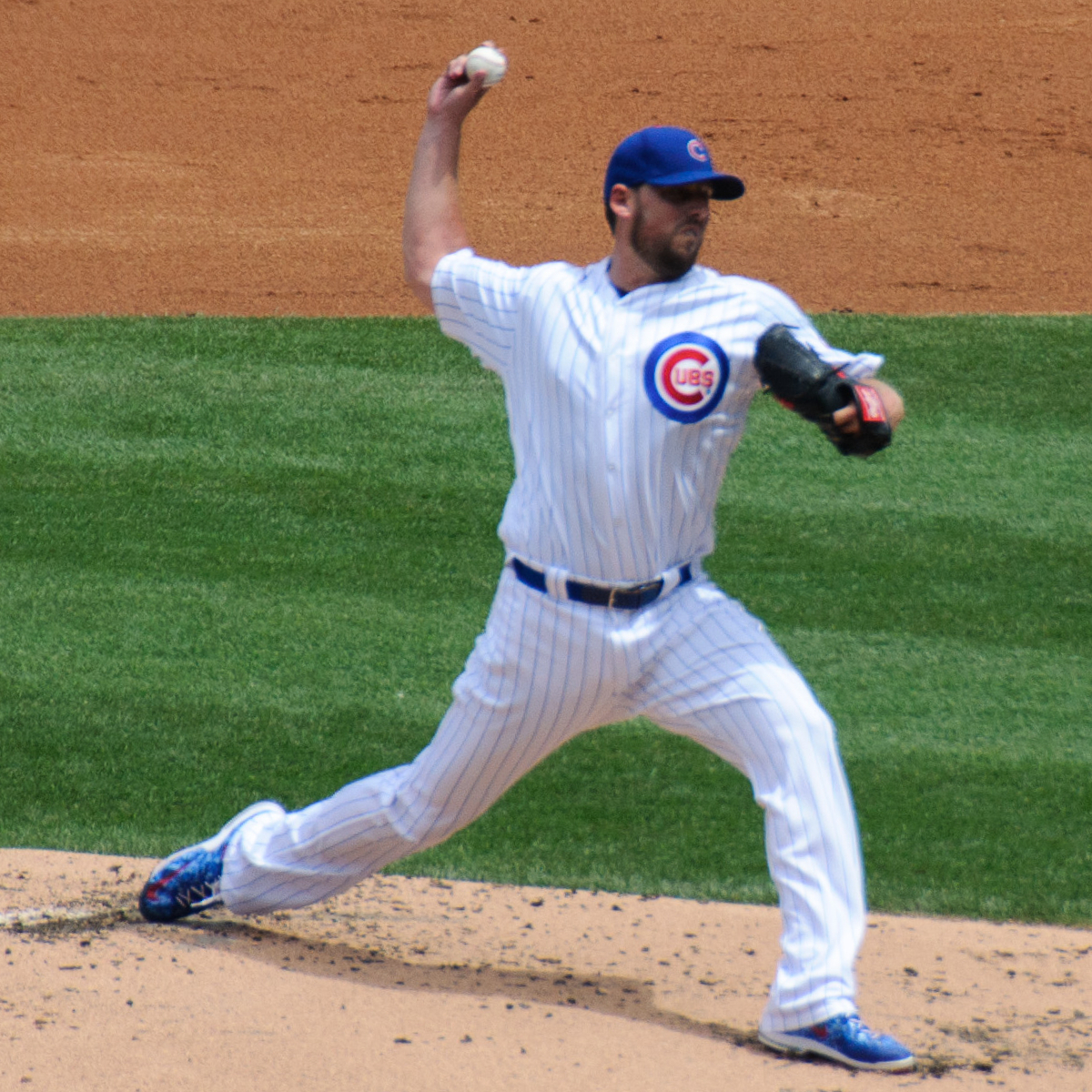
- Lackey with the Chicago Cubs in 2016
- Pitcher
- Born: October 23, 1978 (age 47); Abilene, Texas, U.S.
- Batted: Right Threw: Right

MLB debut
- June 24, 2002, for the Anaheim Angels

Last MLB appearance
- October 1, 2017, for the Chicago Cubs

MLB statistics
- Win–loss record: 188–147
- Earned run average: 3.92
- Strikeouts: 2,294
- Stats at Baseball Reference

Teams
- Anaheim Angels / Los Angeles Angels of Anaheim (2002–2009); Boston Red Sox (2010–2011, 2013–2014); St. Louis Cardinals (2014–2015); Chicago Cubs (2016–2017)

Career highlights and awards
- All-Star (2007); 3× World Series champion (2002, 2013, 2016); AL ERA leader (2007)

John Derran Lackey (born October 23, 1978) is an American former professional baseball starting pitcher who played in Major League Baseball from 2002 through 2017 for the Los Angeles Angels of Anaheim, Boston Red Sox, St. Louis Cardinals and Chicago Cubs. A three-time World Series champion with three different teams, Lackey is regarded as a key figure in his clubs' postseason success, winning the title-clinching games of two out of the three Series. Selected to the MLB All-Star Game in 2007, he won that year's American League (AL) earned run average (ERA) title. After missing the 2012 season due to ulnar collateral ligament reconstruction surgery in his pitching elbow, and helping the Red Sox win the 2013 World Series, Lackey was named the winner of the Tony Conigliaro Award.

A right-handed pitcher and batter, the Anaheim Angels selected Lackey from Grayson County College in Texas in the 1999 amateur draft. He made his MLB debut with the Angels in 2002 and helped the franchise win its first World Series title that year. After winning more than 100 games with the Angels, Lackey signed with Boston in free agency prior to the 2010 season. Declining performance and elbow injuries in 2011 led him to allow the most earned runs in the American League before missing the next season due to elbow surgery. Lackey rebounded in 2013 to win his second championship. Boston traded him to St. Louis in July 2014, and prior to the 2016 season, he signed with Chicago as a free agent. Lackey earned his third World Series championship in 2016 with the Cubs.

Known for his intense competitiveness and overall durability, Lackey reached at least 200 innings pitched six times in his career, and in five seasons was in the top ten in games started. With the exception of his rookie season in 2002, he reached at least 10 wins every season of his career. In ten of his 15 seasons, he registered an ERA below 4.00 − once below 3.00 − and four times was in the top ten in ERA. He also twice reached the top ten in both wins and strikeouts. He appeared in ten postseasons overall, recording a career 8–6 record and 3.44 ERA over 144 innings. In 2007 and 2015, he received votes for the Cy Young Award.

== Early life ==
Lackey was born in Abilene, Texas to Derran and Sharon Lackey. Before Lackey was in high school, he played at Dixie Little League in Abilene. Lackey attended Abilene High School, and was a letterman in football, basketball, and baseball. In baseball, he was a two-time first team All-District honoree and as a senior, he was also an All-State selection.

== College career ==
He played one season of baseball at the University of Texas at Arlington (UTA), playing first base and sometimes moonlighting as a relief pitcher. The first summer after attending UTA, Lackey first learned to pitch in the Kansas Jayhawk Summer League. In 1999, he played on the Junior College World Series champion Grayson County College team in Denison, Texas, which went 50–13. In 100 innings pitched (IP), he posted a 10–3 record with a 4.23 earned run average (ERA) and 88 strikeouts. At the plate, he batted .428 with 15 home runs (HR) and 81 runs batted in (RBI). In the World Series, he tallied eight hits, two HR, and seven RBI.

== Professional career ==
=== Draft and minor leagues ===
The Anaheim Angels selected Lackey in the second round of the 1999 Major League Baseball draft as the 68th overall. He began his professional career with the Boise Hawks in the Short Season Class A Northwest League, posting a 6–2 record and a 4.98 ERA. Already in his first year, Lackey became known for his competitiveness. According to MLB.com, Tom Kotchman, the veteran manager, recalled "one particular game when he tried to replace Lackey only to have the tall Texan tell him otherwise. Sure enough, Kotchman trotted back to the dugout and Lackey kept dominating, as if to say, 'See? I'm not done yet.'"

In 2000, Lackey split his time between the Single-A Cedar Rapids Kernels, High-A Lake Elsinore Storm, and Double-A Erie SeaWolves. Because of his quick ascent up the minor league ladder, he was named the Angels' Minor League Pitcher of the Year, posting a combined 15–9 record with a 3.15 ERA. He began 2001 with Double-A Arkansas before being promoted in July of that year to the Triple-A Salt Lake Stingers, where he struggled a bit, posting a 3–4 record and a 6.71 ERA. He recovered in the 2002 season, being named Best Pitching Prospect of the Pacific Coast League and accumulating an 8–2 record with a 2.57 ERA.

=== Anaheim Angels / Los Angeles Angels of Anaheim (2002–2009) ===
==== 2002 ====
The Angels called Lackey up to the major leagues on June 24, 2002, dropping his first major league start against the Texas Rangers. He was optioned back to Salt Lake, only to be recalled on June 28 to replace pitcher Al Levine. Two days later, he replaced Scott Schoeneweis in the Angels' rotation and gained his first victory against the cross-town rival Los Angeles Dodgers. Lackey was also the winning pitcher for the American League (AL) Wild Card-clinching victory against Texas on September 26.

With the AL Wild Card in hand, the Angels began their march through the 2002 postseason, facing the New York Yankees in the American League Division Series (ALDS). He made his relief and postseason debut in Game 3, allowing two earned runs in the midst of an Angels rally to win 9–6. He gained his first postseason victory against the Minnesota Twins in Game 4 of the American League Championship Series (ALCS), pitching seven innings while allowing only three hits and striking out seven.

With their victory in five games over the Twins, the Angels earned their first AL pennant and trip to the World Series. After starter Kevin Appier was pulled after two-plus innings in Game 2, Lackey pitched two innings giving up two earned runs on two hits, receiving a no-decision in the eventual 11–10 Angels victory over the San Francisco Giants. He started Game 4 of the Series, pitching four scoreless innings, but gaining a no-decision after allowing three hits and three earned runs in the 5th inning in the eventual Angels loss.

However, in Game 7 of the World Series on October 27, 2002, Lackey allowed one earned run on four hits while striking out four in five innings, allowing the Angels to hold an early 4–1 lead to hand over to their bullpen trio of Brendan Donnelly, Francisco Rodríguez, and Troy Percival to seal their World Series title. Lackey became only the second rookie in World Series history to start and win Game 7, the other being Babe Adams of the 1909 Pittsburgh Pirates. It was the first of two Series title-clinching games in which he received credit as the winning pitcher.

==== 2003–2006 ====
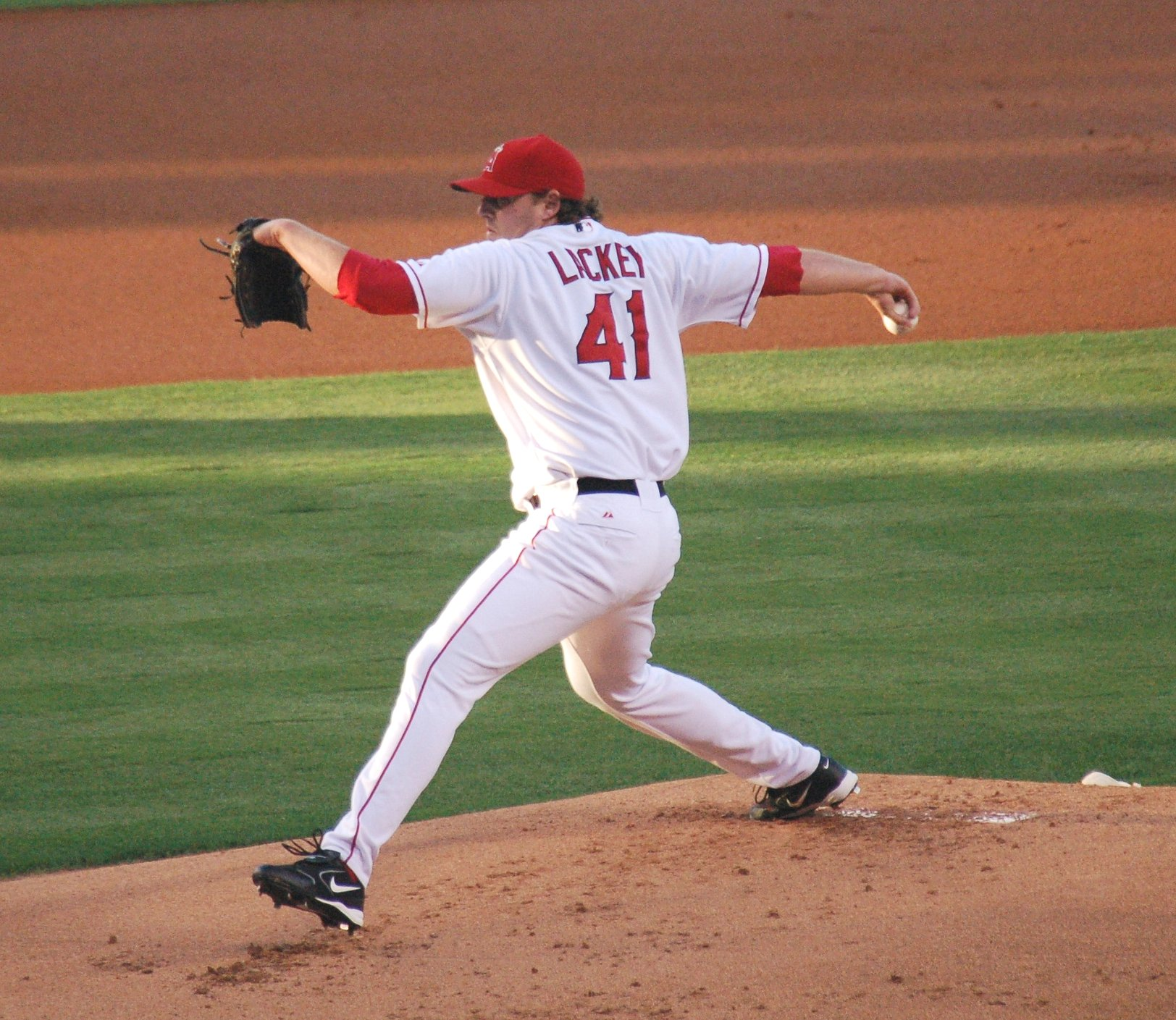
Lackey pitching for the Los Angeles Angels of Anaheim in 2006

Mike Scioscia announced that Lackey would start on Opening Day 2003, replacing injured ace Jarrod Washburn. Lackey struggled his sophomore year, compiling a 10–16 record with a 4.63 ERA while leading the team in hits and earned runs allowed, and wild pitches. He finished 2004 with a record of 14–13 and a 4.67 ERA, helping the Angels win their first division title since 1986. The 2005 campaign saw Lackey mature further, working into the sixth inning in 30 of his 36 starts, earning a 14–5 record with a 3.44 ERA. He ranked second in strikeouts per nine innings (with 8.6 K/9 IP) and third in strikeouts (199). However, he finished with the third most wild pitches in the league.

He participated in the MLB 2006 All-Star Series in Japan. After the Angels placed 2005 Cy Young winner Bartolo Colón on the disabled list in 2006, Lackey emerged as the team's ace, and skipper Mike Scioscia made him the number one starter after the All-Star break. On July 7, 2006, Lackey retired 27 consecutive batters after Mark Kotsay of the Oakland Athletics led off the first inning with double. He threw a career high 30 2/3 scoreless innings from July 2 through July 19, 2006, when he gave up a fifth-inning home run to Ben Broussard of the Cleveland Indians, leaving his scoreless streak 5 1/3 innings short of the club record, set by Jim McGlothlin in 1967. He was later named American League Pitcher of the Month for July 2006.

==== 2007–2009 ====
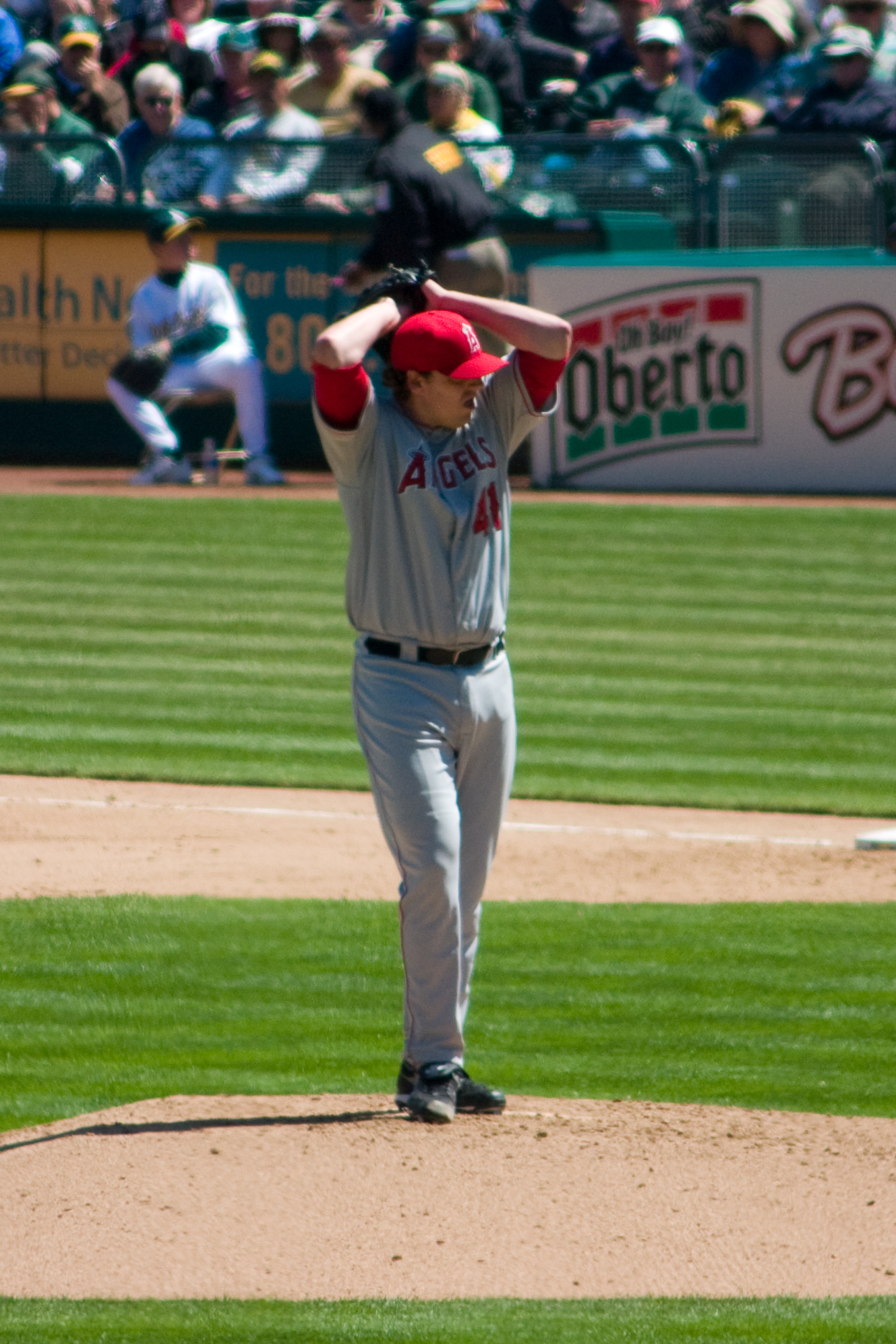
Lackey on April 18, 2007

On June 13, 2007, Lackey became the first pitcher to win 10 games for the 2007 season. On July 1, Lackey was named as one of three Angels to represent the club and the American League at the 2007 All-Star Game. Lackey finished the 2007 season with an American League leading 3.01 ERA. He finished in third place for that season's Cy Young Award voting.

On July 10, 2008, Lackey allowed six runs on 15 hits in 5 2/3 innings. The 15 hits tied an all-time Angels' franchise record for hits allowed by a starter in a single game.

On July 18, 2008, Lackey recorded his 1000th career strikeout, against Kevin Youkilis of the Boston Red Sox. Lackey was the sixth Angels pitcher to accomplish that feat. On July 29, 2008, Lackey pitched against the Red Sox at Fenway Park, carrying a no-hitter into the ninth inning. He came within two outs of a no-hitter before Dustin Pedroia singled to left to spoil it. The next batter, Youkilis, hit a two-run homer to break up the shutout. Lackey still finished the game and the Angels won 6–2.

In Game 1 of the 2008 ALDS, he gave up a two-run home run to Jason Bay of the Red Sox, and was charged with the Angels' first loss in the series.

In his first start of 2009, on May 16, Lackey was ejected after his first two pitches of the season in a game against the Texas Rangers. Lackey threw his first pitch behind Ian Kinsler's head, and hit Kinsler in the side with his second pitch. Home plate umpire Bob Davidson immediately ejected Lackey. Since Kinsler scored, Lackey was charged with an earned run, giving him an ERA of infinity. Kinsler had hit two home runs against the Angels the night before.

On August 30, 2009, Lackey earned his 100th career win against the Oakland Athletics, giving up one run (on an error by shortstop Erick Aybar) through eight innings.

Lackey is one of only six major league pitchers who won at least 11 games in each year from 2004 to 2009, the others being CC Sabathia, Derek Lowe, Johan Santana, Javier Vázquez, and Jason Marquis.

At the end of the 2009 season Lackey became a free agent, widely regarded as the best free agent starting pitcher on the 2010 market. Baseball Prospectus declared, "Lackey stands alone as the best of the best, a relatively young righty who carries significantly less risk than the other high-upside hurlers", additionally noting he faced a tough division and tougher league and his statistics would likely be even better if he were a National League pitcher. As one of the top free agent starters on the market, he was predicted to command a deal worth around $70 to $80 million, similar to the deal A. J. Burnett received from the Yankees. Lackey drew interest from many teams, including the Seattle Mariners, the Milwaukee Brewers, the New York Yankees, the New York Mets, the Boston Red Sox, and the Pittsburgh Pirates. He formally declined the Angels' offer of salary arbitration on December 8.

=== Boston Red Sox (2010–2014) ===
On December 16, 2009, Lackey officially signed a five-year contract worth $82.5 million with the Boston Red Sox. His contract had a clause where if he missed a full season due to injury, the Red Sox would have a team option at the end of the contract worth the league minimum. On April 7, 2010, Lackey made his debut for Boston at Fenway Park against the Yankees, pitching six innings of three-hit, shutout ball.

==== 2010 ====
Lackey posted a 10–5 record and a 4.26 ERA during the first half of the 2010 season and finished his first season with the Red Sox with a 14–11 record, 4.40 ERA over 215 innings pitched.

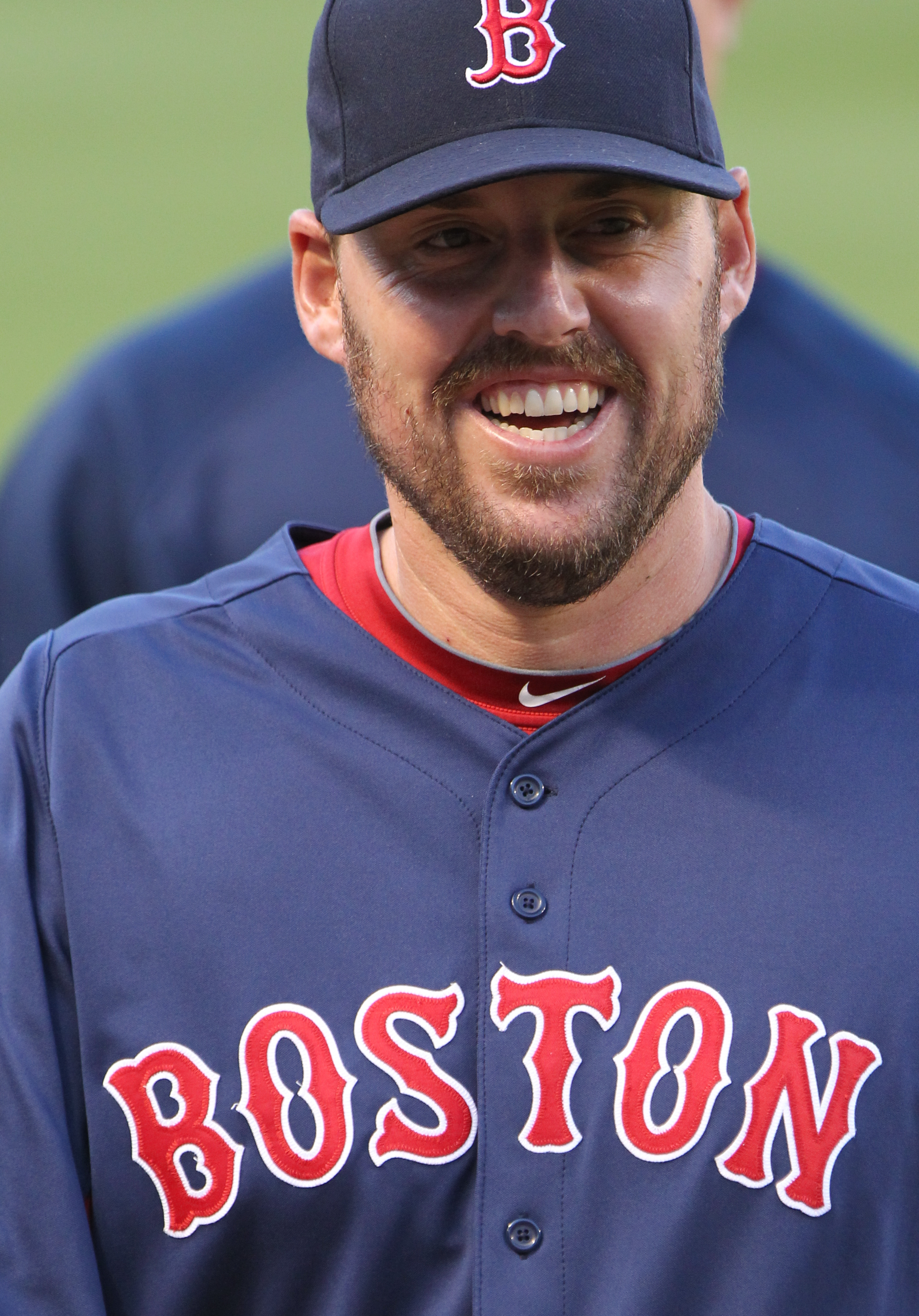
Lackey with the Boston Red Sox in 2011

==== 2011 ====
Lackey went 2–5 with an 8.01 ERA in his first seven starts, and in May, he was placed on the disabled list with an elbow strain in his throwing arm. Lackey returned shortly, recording an ERA over 5.00 in every month but one. In 28 starts, Lackey finished the season 12–12 with a 6.41 ERA and 1.62 WHIP, both career worsts. The 114 earned runs he allowed were the most in the American League, and his ERA was the highest in Red Sox history for a starter with at least 150 innings pitched. In the end of the 2011 season, Lackey and two more starting pitchers (Josh Beckett and Jon Lester, allegedly) were in the center of a controversy that told that the three (and sometimes more) drank beers and ate fried chicken in the clubhouse during games in which they were not pitching.

==== 2012 ====
During a press conference, Ben Cherington, the new GM of the Boston Red Sox, revealed that John Lackey had Tommy John surgery during the 2011 offseason. As a result, Lackey did not pitch for the entire 2012 season. Lackey was later seen drinking beer in the clubhouse during his rehabilitation, causing further controversy.

==== 2013 ====
On April 6, Lackey injured his arm in his first start since September 2011. The Red Sox announced it was a right biceps strain. On April 28, Lackey got his first win since the 2011 season, going six innings, giving up one run and five hits in a 6–1 win over the Houston Astros.

On October 30, Lackey was the winning pitcher in Game 6 of the 2013 World Series, which clinched the Boston Red Sox' eighth World Series title. In doing so, Lackey became the first starting pitcher in Major League history to win two World Series "clinching" games with two different teams. Lackey garnered much media attention by his refusal to leave the game when Manager John Farrell came to the mound with two outs in the seventh inning, telling Farrell "this is my guy" (referring to the next batter, Matt Holliday). Farrell allowed Lackey to stay in the game, but he eventually walked Holliday to load the bases. Lackey exited to a standing ovation from Fenway Park.

Many credited Lackey's turnaround as a major reason for the Red Sox' success in 2013, especially at mid-season when Clay Buchholz went on the disabled list and Jon Lester was going through a rough stretch. Lackey finished 2013 with a 10–13 record and a 3.52 ERA. He was plagued by a lack of run support throughout the season, but threw two complete games, the first time in a season that he had multiple complete games since 2008.

After the season, Lackey was awarded with the Tony Conigliaro Award, an award given out to the player who has overcome the most adversity.

==== 2014 ====
Lackey began the 2014 season as the Red Sox' number-two starter behind Lester. He made six starts in April, with four being quality starts, and two giving up six runs in less than six innings. Dating back to the previous May 23, he had thrown six straight quality starts, going 3–1 with a 1.60 ERA and 34 strikeouts.

On July 5, Orioles designated hitter Nelson Cruz went 3-for-3 with a double off of Lackey. Cruz had served a 50-game suspension for his involvement in the Biogenesis baseball scandal the previous season, which Cruz claimed he had sought help from Biogenesis of America to fight a gastrointestinal infection. After Cruz' big game, Lackey stated, "I'm not going to comment on him. I've got nothing to say about him. There are some things I would like to say but I'm not going to. You guys forget pretty conveniently about stuff." Orioles manager Buck Showalter countered by saying, "Considering the timing of things, it's one of those things that you keep quiet about it and it reflects poorly upon the person who said it."

=== St. Louis Cardinals (2014–2015) ===
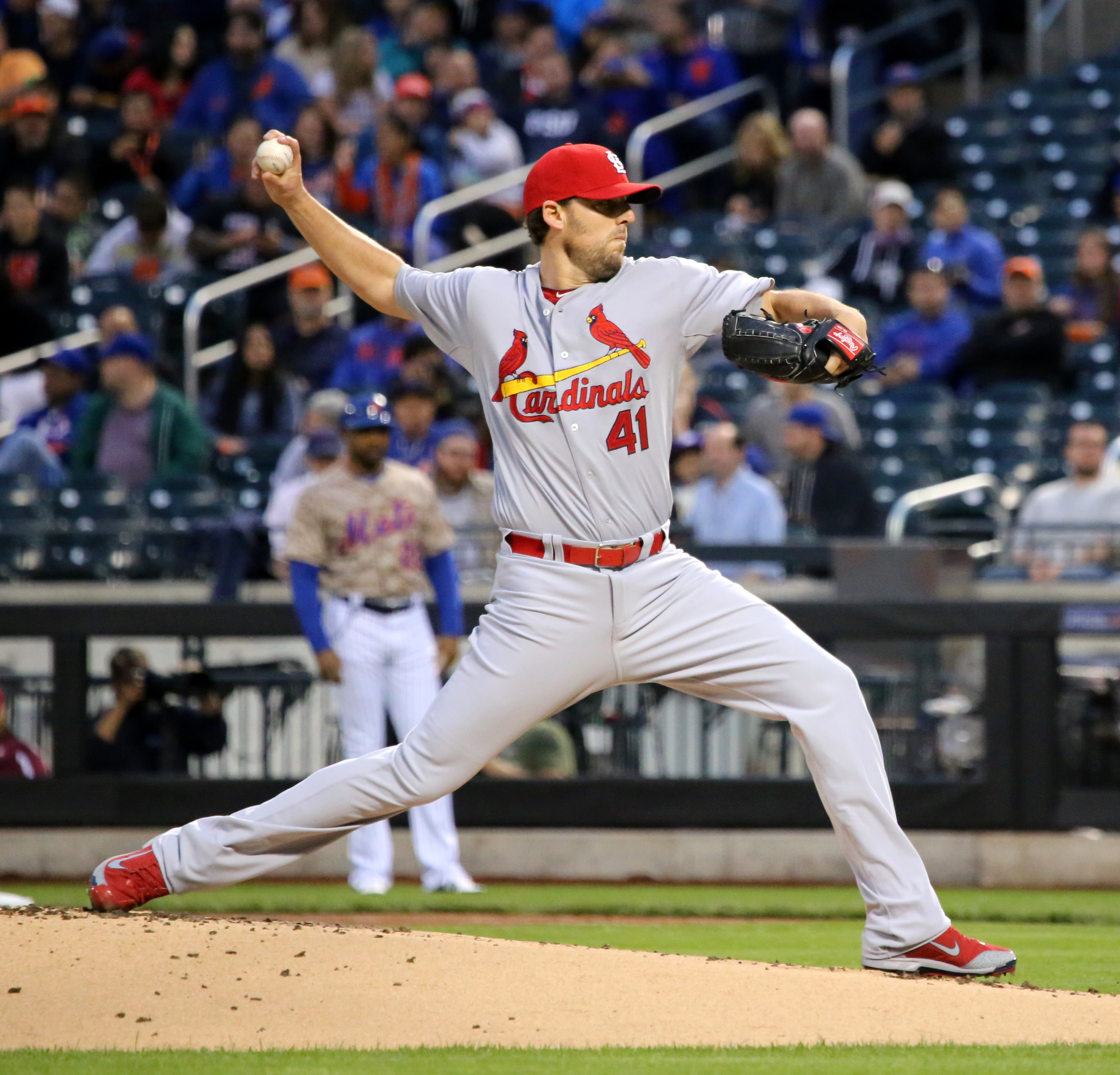
Lackey pitching for the St. Louis Cardinals in 2015

On July 31, 2014, the Red Sox traded Lackey with minor league pitcher Corey Littrell to the St. Louis Cardinals for outfielder Allen Craig and pitcher Joe Kelly. In his Cardinals debut, Lackey pitched seven innings but was behind 2–0 when he exited the game. The Cardinals rallied for three runs the next inning, and ended up winning the game 3–2 while crediting him the win, the 150th of his career. Catcher A. J. Pierzynski, acquired from the Red Sox the same month, caught Lackey for the 19th time in 22 starts in 2014. Wearing uniform number 41 during his tenure with Anaheim and Boston, Lackey acquired the number from new teammate Pat Neshek in exchange for an autographed Babe Ruth baseball.

In 10 regular season starts for the Cardinals, Lackey allowed two or fewer runs in seven of them. He totaled a 3–3 W–L with a 4.30 ERA in 60 2/3 IP with St. Louis, and his totals for the year including those with Boston were 14-10 W–L with a 3.82 ERA and 164 strikeouts in 198 innings. He made the postseason for the seventh time in his career, starting once each against the Los Angeles Dodgers in the National League Division Series (NLDS) and the San Francisco Giants in the National League Championship Series (NLCS). The Giants defeated the Cardinals in five games, ending their season. Instead of retiring and foregoing being paid the league minimum, Lackey had stated in the previous August that he would pitch in 2015 if the Cardinals picked up the option that actuated because he missed the 2012 season due to Tommy John surgery. On October 30, the Cardinals announced they had picked up the Tommy John option. With a guaranteed base salary of $507,000, the club added performance bonuses before the start of the season.

In 7 2/3 IP against the Chicago Cubs on May 7, 2015, Lackey struck out 10. He also drove in his third career run with a double, his third career extra base hit in a 5–1 win. On July 12, despite the Cardinals losing to the Pittsburgh Pirates 6–5 in 14 innings, he achieved his sixth consecutive quality start, and 12th in 15 appearances. He lost to the Cincinnati Reds on July 29, but gave up just one run with eight strikeouts while allowing one walk and two hits. It was the fewest hits he allowed through that point in the season. He also allowed three runs or fewer in all but of one of his prior 17 starts.

By earning his 10th win of 2015 in a 6–2 defeat of the Miami Marlins on August 15, Lackey recorded his 12th consecutive season of double-digit victory totals. He struck out six in 8 1/3 innings and retired nine batters in a row at one point. One of the hits Lackey allowed was a single to Ichiro Suzuki, a hit with which Ichiro passed Ty Cobb for the total attained in top-level professional baseball organizations, including Nippon Professional Baseball and Major League Baseball. With seven scoreless innings of the Milwaukee Brewers on September 17, Lackey reached 200 IP for the sixth time in his career and first time since 2010. He had a 2.23 ERA over his last 17 starts. By reaching 200 IP, he triggered a $400,000 bonus, bringing his earnings for the season over $2 million. Further, Lackey turned in a season that exceeded his career norms, including a career-best 2.77 ERA, seventh-best in the league, and recorded 218 IP, his highest total since 2010. His fastball average speed for the season was 91.6 miles per hour (147.4 km/h), the highest since 2009.

The Cardinals won 100 games and the National League Central division, and made Lackey the Game 1 starter of the NLDS against the Cubs. He opposed Jon Lester — both men had faced the Cardinals in the World Series two years earlier as teammates with the Red Sox. Lackey held the Cubs hitless through the first five innings on the way to pitching 7 1/3 shutout innings in a 4–0 win. The Cardinals started him on three days' for Game 4, the elimination game. He allowed a three-run home run to Javier Báez, Lackey's first allowed in the playoffs since 2008, a span of 75 1/3 innings. The Cubs won this game and the series, ending the Cardinals' season, with Lackey's free agency following.

=== Chicago Cubs (2016–2017) ===
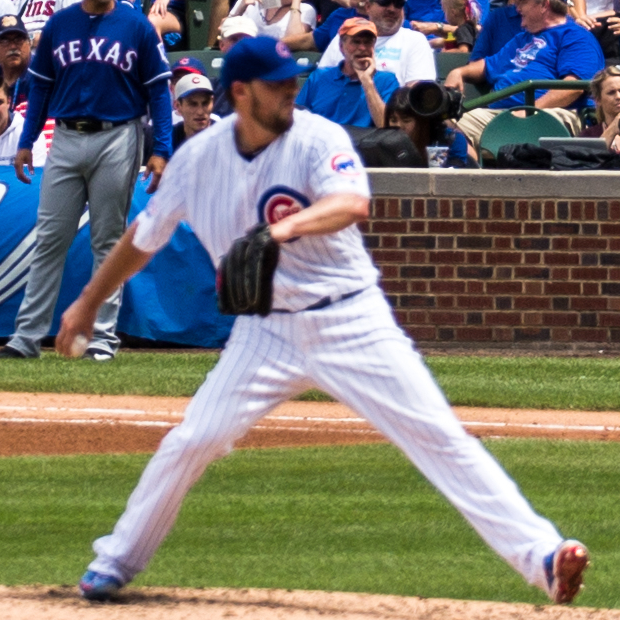
Lackey pitching for the Chicago Cubs in 2016

On December 8, 2015, Lackey signed a two-year, $32 million contract with the Chicago Cubs.

On April 18, 2016, in a game against the Cardinals, his former club, Lackey struck out 11 hitters in seven innings, earning his third win of the season. It was also his first regular season win against St. Louis, making him only the 16th player to notch a win against all 30 major league teams. He joined Al Leiter, Randy Johnson, Kevin Brown, Barry Zito, Terry Mulholland, Curt Schilling, Woody Williams, Jamie Moyer, Javier Vázquez, Vicente Padilla, Derek Lowe, Dan Haren, A. J. Burnett, Kyle Lohse, and Tim Hudson as the only players to achieve this milestone. He reached double-digit win totals for the 13th consecutive season on September 21, 2016, in a 9−2 win over the Cincinnati Reds. In 29 starts of 2016, Lackey finished 11–8 with a 3.35 ERA. With the Cubs finishing the season 103–58, the team clinched the NL Central Division. Lackey won the World Series for the third time of his career, and with a third different team after the Cubs beat the Cleveland Indians in the 2016 World Series, ending a 108-year long drought for a championship.

On August 16, 2017, against the Cincinnati Reds, Lackey recorded his first career stolen base, but was then picked off shortly thereafter.

On September 15, 2017, Lackey was ejected and fined for arguing a strike call by umpire Jordan Baker. Baker also ejected catcher Willson Contreras who was arguing the same strike call. He became a free agent after the Cubs lost to the Los Angeles Dodgers in the NLCS.

=== Retirement ===
During the 2018 season, Lackey was offered a minor league contract by the Arizona Diamondbacks, and promptly turned it down. At a Chicago Cubs home game on September 27, 2018, Lackey was in attendance, and toasted to the camera when it panned to him. After the season concluded, Lackey officially retired.

== Personal life ==
On August 30, 2011, Lackey filed for divorce from Krista, his wife of almost three years, who had been battling cancer since March and underwent chemotherapy through June. The divorce was finalized by February 2012.

Lackey resides in the Austin area in the off-season. He and his wife, Kristina Carter, had their first child, a daughter, in November 2015. He is also a stepfather to Kristina's children from her first marriage.

Lackey was featured as a pitcher for one inning during the Savannah Bananas game at Angels Stadium, May 31, 2025.

== Popular culture ==
In 2009, the satirical publication The Onion published an article about Lackey, titled "Superstitious John Lackey Has to Build, Destroy a Luxury Hotel Before Every Start." The article was intended to satirize superstitious professional athletes.

He was featured in a 2011 Kevin Fowler music video alongside fellow Red Sox starting pitchers Josh Beckett, Jon Lester, Tim Wakefield, and Clay Buchholz.

In 2021, Lackey made a cameo in the football film Under the Stadium Lights as a guest speaker at a pep rally.

== See also ==
- List of Major League Baseball annual shutout leaders
- List of Major League Baseball career hit batsmen leaders
- List of Major League Baseball career putouts as a pitcher leaders
- List of Major League Baseball career strikeout leaders
- List of people from Abilene, Texas
- List of University of Texas at Arlington people
- List of World Series starting pitchers
- Los Angeles Angels award winners and league leaders

Awards and achievements
Preceded by Johan Santana; Scott Kazmir	American League Pitcher of the Month; July 2006; June 2008	Succeeded by Esteban Loaiza; Jon Lester
