= Calvert Independent School District =

School district in Texas, United States

Address
- 1007 Hanna Calvert, Texas, 77837; United States
- Coordinates: 30.9838°N 96.6656°W

District information
- Type: Public
- Grades: PK–12
- Schools: 1
- NCES District ID: 4812540

Students and staff
- Students: 147 (2023–2024)
- Teachers: 18.00 (on an FTE basis) (2023–2024)
- Staff: 21.90 (on an FTE basis) (2023–2024)
- Student–teacher ratio: 8.17 (2023–2024)

Other information
- Website: www.calvertisd.com

Calvert Independent School District is a public school district based in Calvert, Texas (USA).

== Academic achievement ==
In 2009, the school district was rated "academically acceptable" by the Texas Education Agency.

== Schools ==
- Calvert High School (Grades 9-12)

== Special programs ==
=== Athletics ===
Calvert High School plays six-man football.

== See also ==
- List of school districts in Texas
- List of high schools in Texas
