= Franklin Carnegie Library =

- U.S. National Register of Historic Places
- Recorded Texas Historic Landmark
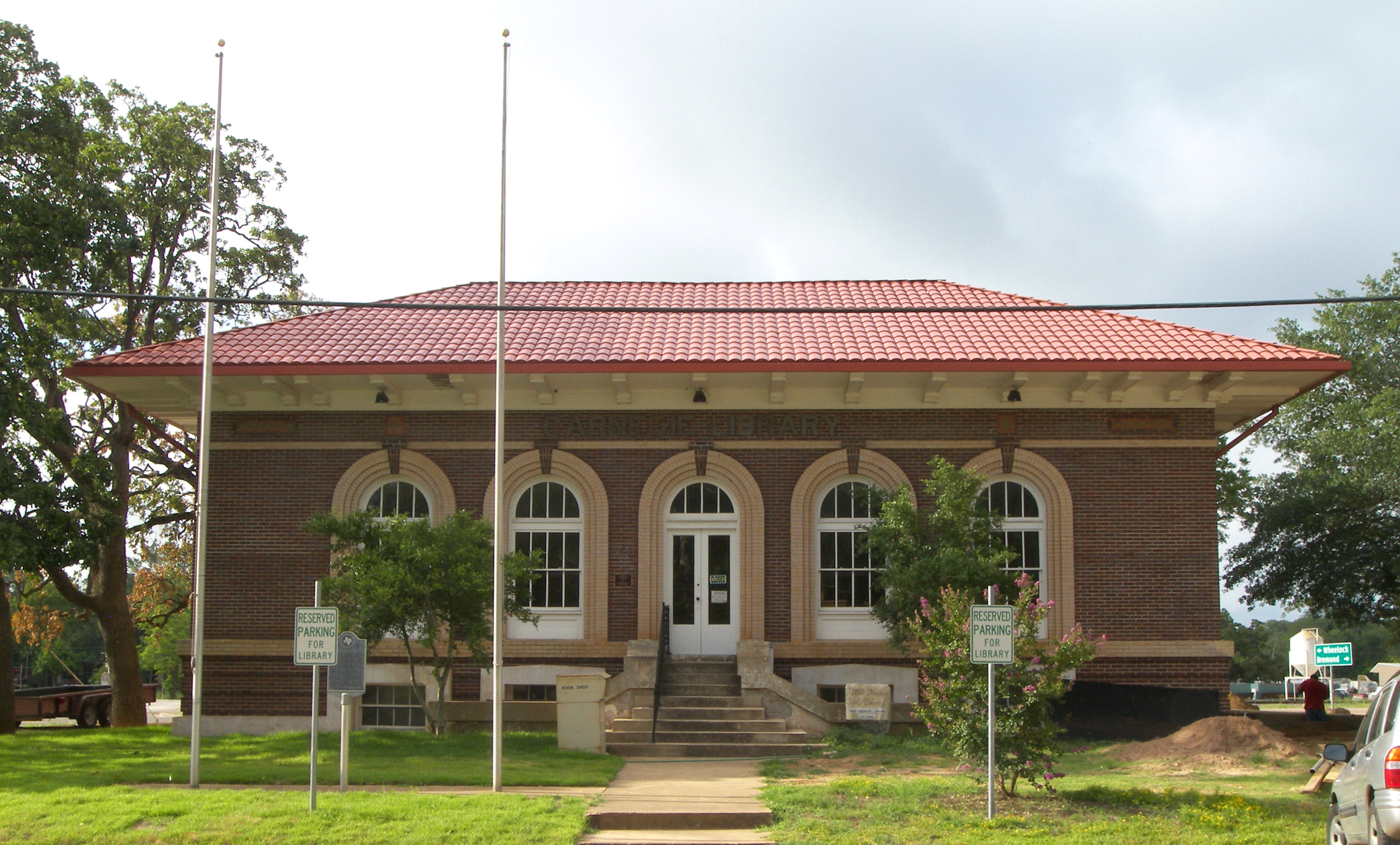
- Franklin Carnegie Library in 2010.

- Location within Texas Location within the United States
- Location: 315 East Decherd, Franklin, Texas
- Coordinates: 31°1′44″N 96°29′3″W
- Area: less than one acre
- Built: 1914
- Architect: Wayne Patterson
- Architectural style: Renaissance
- NRHP reference No.: 05001337
- RTHL No.: 10925

Significant dates
- Added to NRHP: November 25, 2005
- Designated RTHL: 1986

Franklin Carnegie Library is an historic library building at 315 E Decherd in Franklin, Texas. Before 1913, the City of Franklin housed its 1,000 volume library in its city hall. The city applied for a grant from the Carnegie Corporation and $7,500 was awarded for the construction of a new library. The building was completed in 1914 but only served as a library through 1918. It was then used for school classes and civic activities though 1984. Currently, it houses the Robertson County Library. It added to the National Register of Historic Places on November 25, 2005.

== See also ==
- National Register of Historic Places listings in Robertson County, Texas
- Recorded Texas Historic Landmarks in Robertson County
