= Calvert Historic District =

Historic district in Texas, United States

- U.S. National Register of Historic Places
- U.S. Historic district
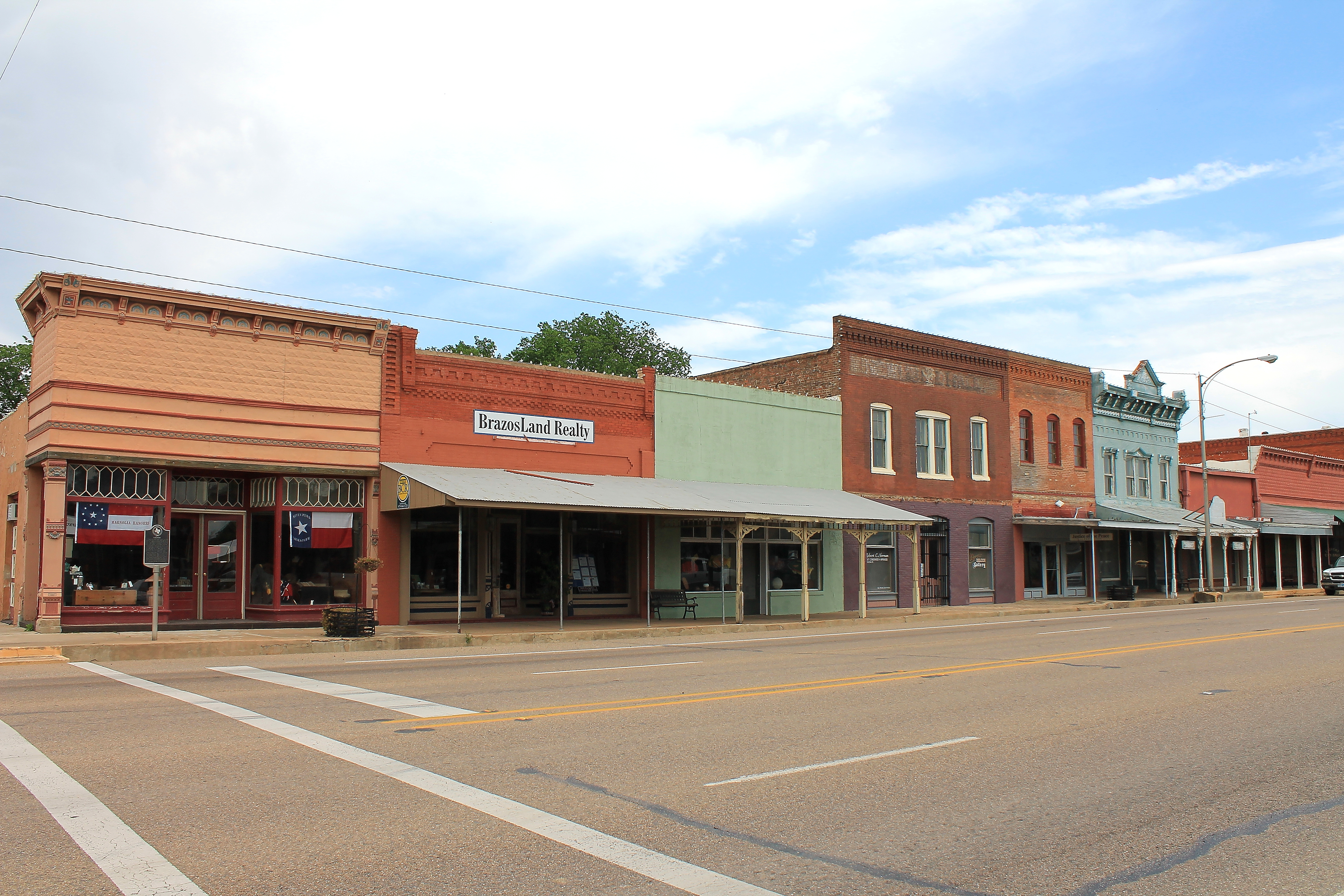
- Calvert Historic District in 2013

- Location within Texas Location within the United States
- Location: Roughly bounded by Main, Garritt, Pin Oak, Maple, and Barton Sts., Calvert, Texas
- Coordinates: 30°58′48″N 96°40′16″W
- Area: 70 acres (28 ha)
- Architect: Multiple; Unknown
- Architectural style: Colonial Revival, Late Victorian, Queen Anne
- NRHP reference No.: 78002978
- Added to NRHP: April 3, 1978

The Calvert Historic District is a historic district which comprises 70 acres (280,000 m^{2}) roughly bounded by Main, Garritt, Pin Oak, Maple, and Barton streets in Calvert, Texas. Contributing properties in the district consist of 82 buildings, one site and two other structures. On April 3, 1978, the district was added to the National Register of Historic Places.

== Photo gallery ==
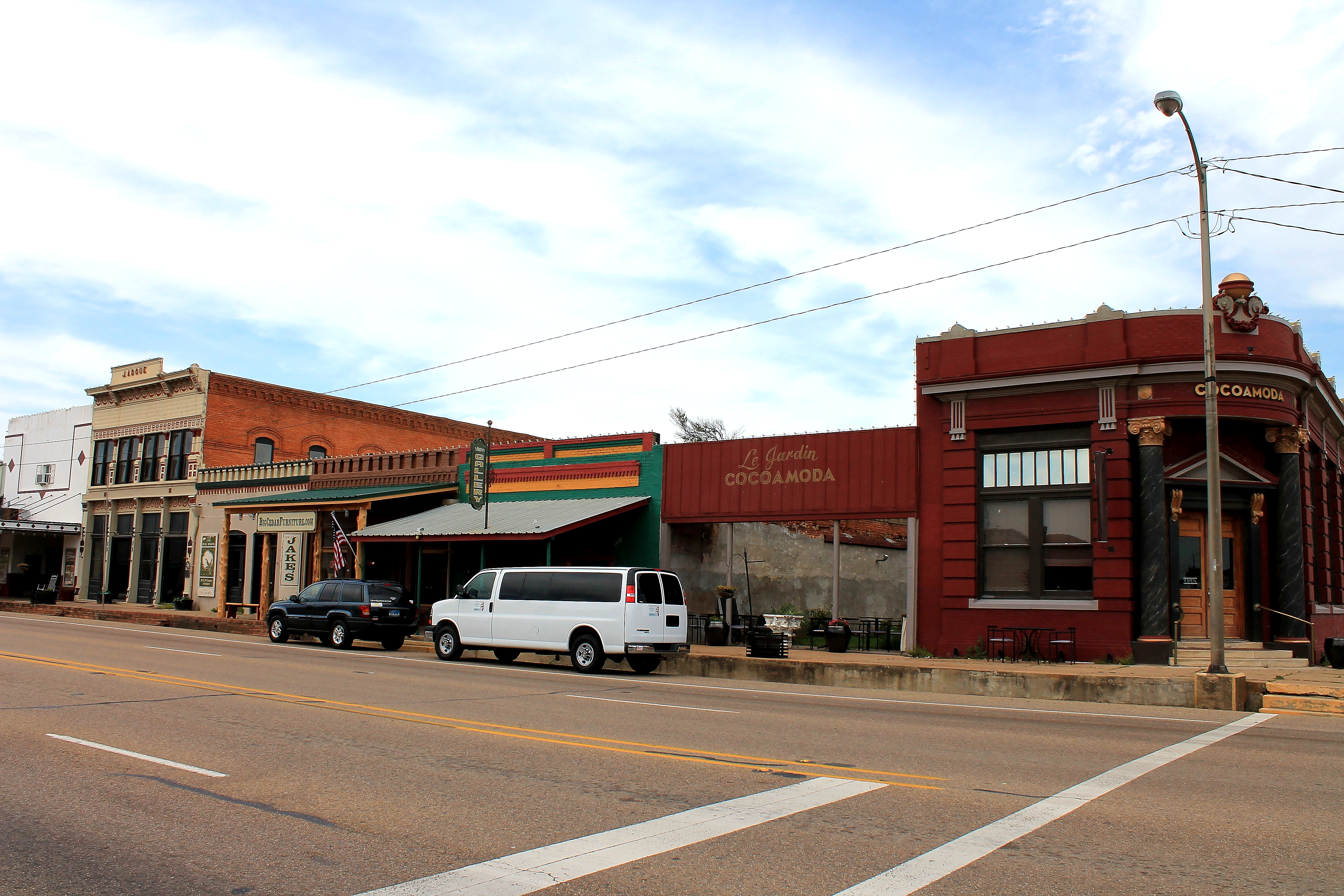

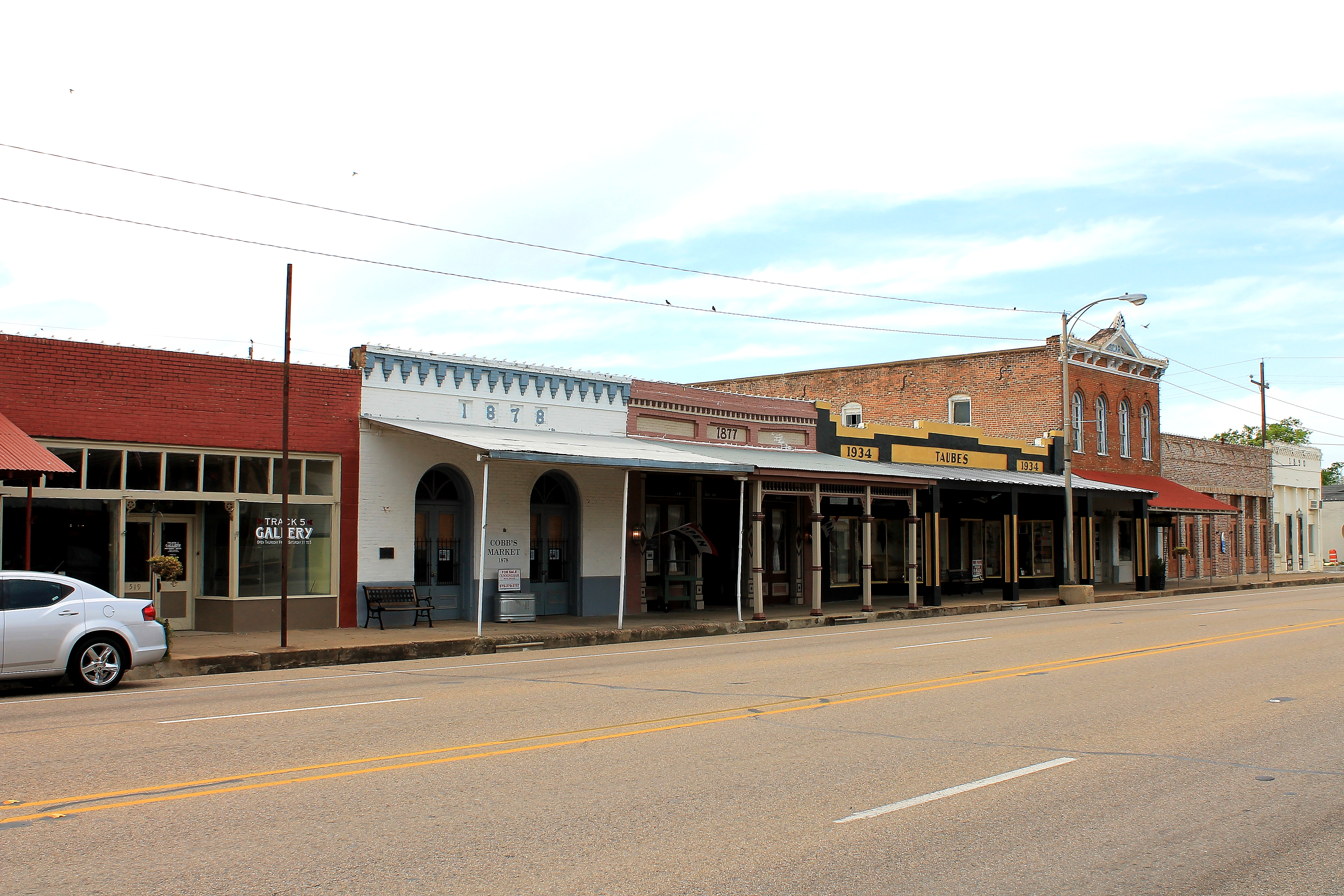

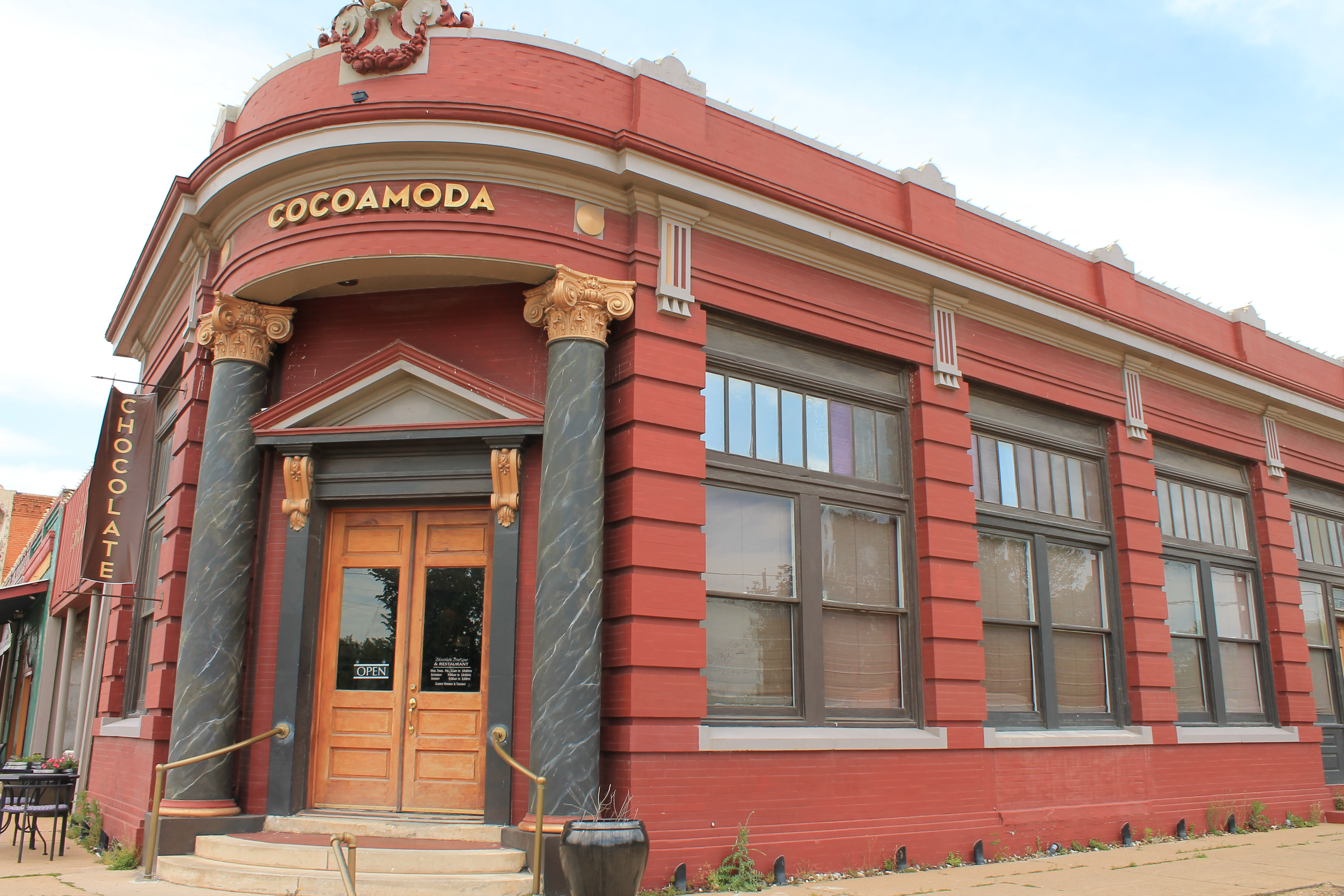

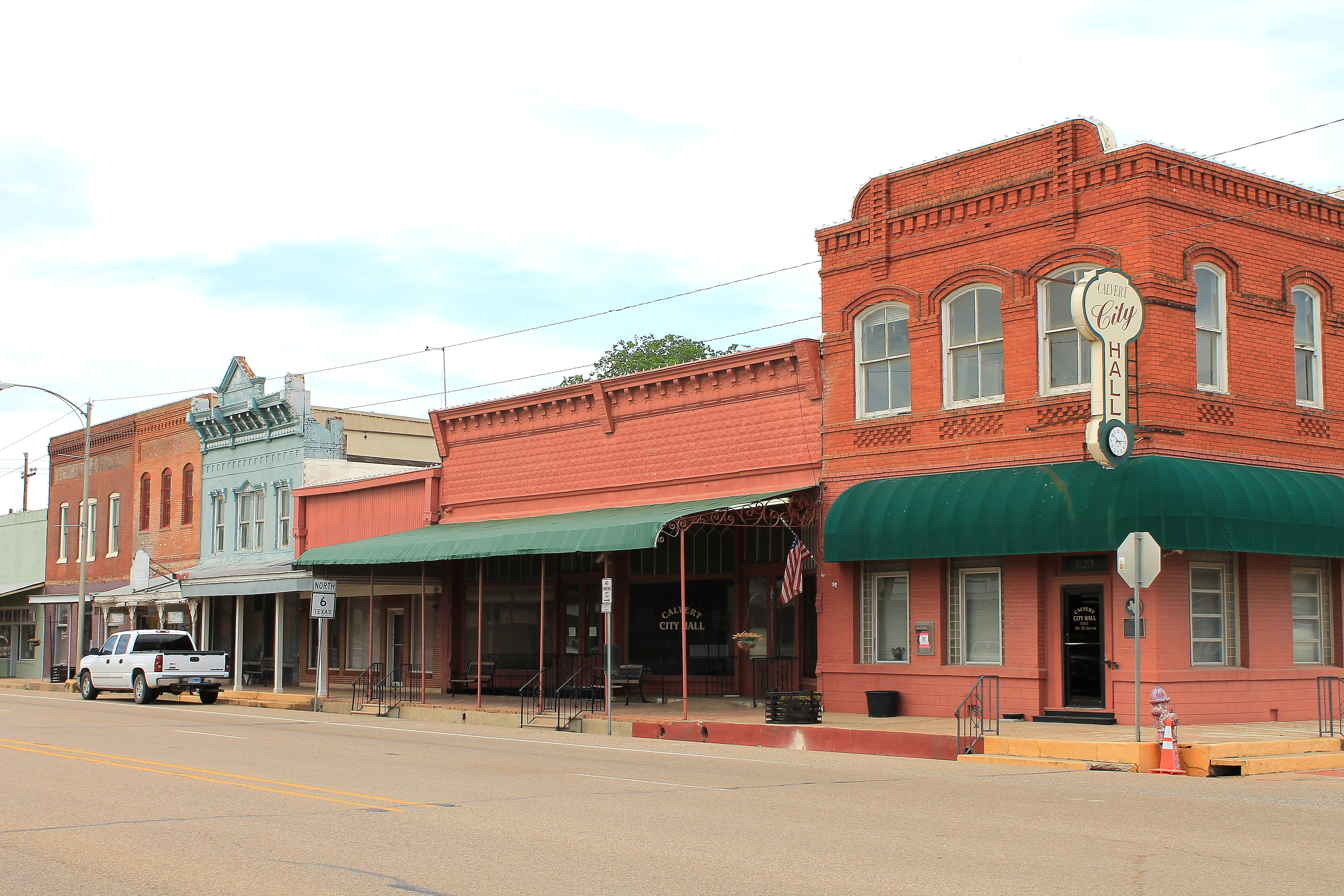

== See also ==
- National Register of Historic Places listings in Robertson County, Texas
- Recorded Texas Historic Landmarks in Robertson County
