= Reverend L.T. Thomas =

American preacher and artist (1904–1995)

Lilion T. Thomas (born October 9, 1904 in Calvert, Texas; died 1995 in Abilene, Texas) was an American pastor and self-taught artist. He began drawing portraits in the 1940s while working as a pastor at Mt. B Zion Baptist Church in Kerens, Texas. He was given the nickname "Thunderbolt" due to his hellfire-preaching sermons. In the 1960s he became pastor at Mt. Pleasant Baptist Church in Abilene, Texas where he continued his artistic practice. His art would feature famous outlaws such as Clyde Barrow and Bonnie Parker. He used different materials to create portraits and figures in profile.

== Selected exhibitions ==
- Spirited Journeys: Self-Taught Texas Artists of the Twentieth Century, August 29 – October 19, 1997

== Selected permanent collections ==
- Collection de L'art Brut, Lausanne, Switzerland
