= Robert Calvert (Texas pioneer) =

Robert Calvert (February 19, 1802 - September 20, 1867) was a community founder and state legislator in Texas. He had a plantation west of what became the town of Calvert, Texas, named for him. He served in the Texas House of Representatives. He urged the Houston and Texas Central Railway to build through the area. The Houston and Texas Central Railroad agreed to build a station in the town in 1868.

== Biography ==
He was born in Wartrace, Tennessee. William Calvert and Lucy née Rogers Calvert were his parents. His family moved in Alabama and he married Mary Keesee in Bibb County August 28, 1823. In 1838 he moved to Saline County, Arkansas and served as a county judge. In 1850 settled in Robertson County, Texas. He grew cotton and corn in the Brazos Bottoms.

He was an elder in the Presbyterian Church and belonged to the mason fraternity. He had a son who contracted an illness during the Mexican War, three daughters, and a grandson who died in the Civil War.

He lived in Wheelock, Texas. He represented House District 46 from November 7, 1853 to November 5, 1855 in the Texas House of Representatives. He is buried at the Sterling Cemetery in Calvert.
