= Calvert, Texas =

- City
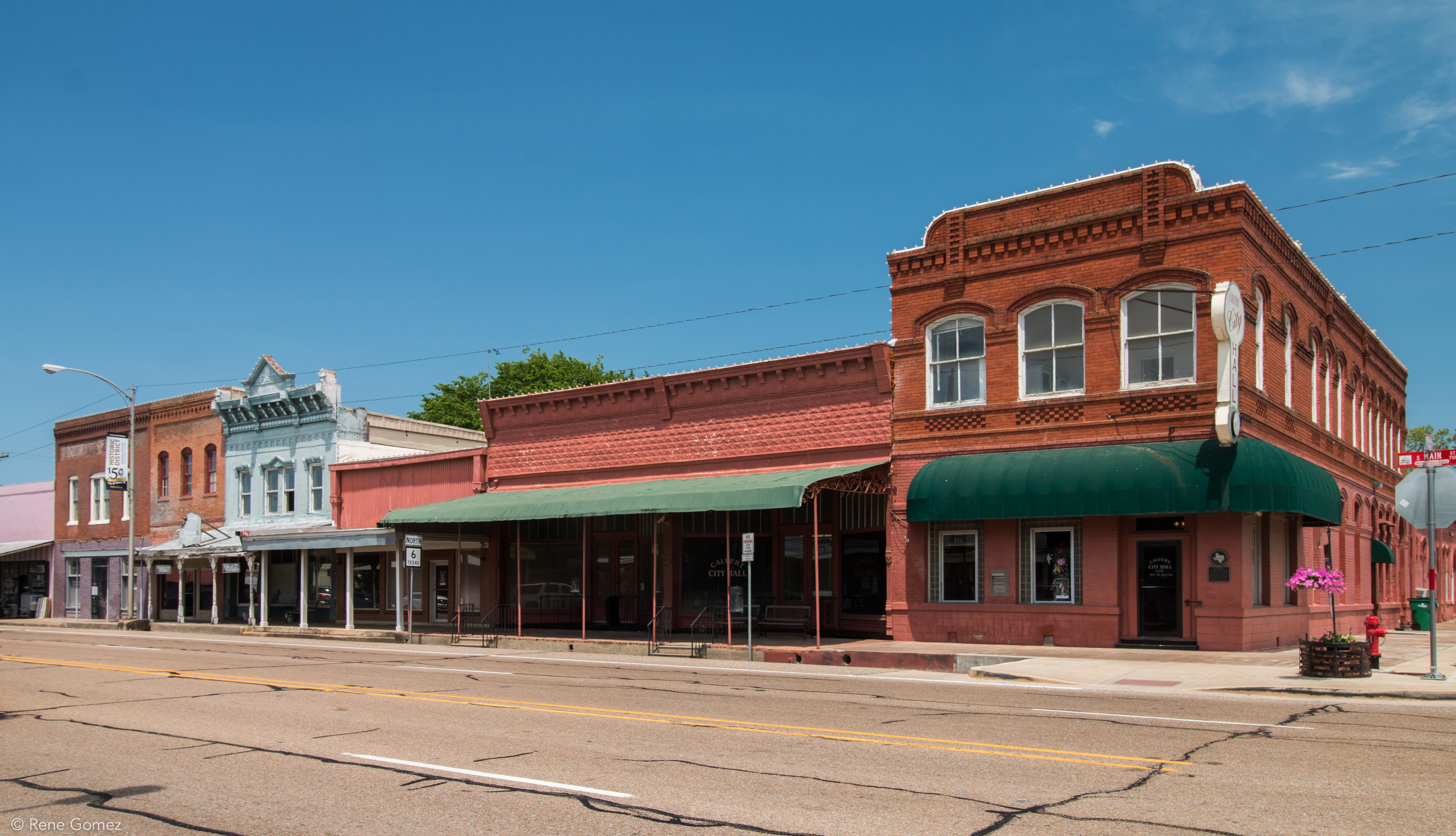
- Calvert Historic District (2018)
- Nickname: Calvy
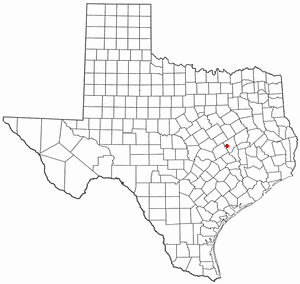
- Location of Calvert within Texas
- Coordinates: 30°58′45″N 96°40′18″W
- Country: United States
- State: Texas
- County: Robertson

Area
  - Total: 3.89 sq mi (10.07 km^{2})
  - Land: 3.89 sq mi (10.07 km^{2})
  - Water: 0 sq mi (0.00 km^{2})
- Elevation: 335 ft (102 m)

Population (2020)
  - Total: 962
  - Density: 289.5/sq mi (111.76/km^{2})
- Time zone: UTC-6 (Central (CST))
  - Summer (DST): UTC-5 (CDT)
- ZIP code: 77837
- Area code: 979
- FIPS code: 48-11992
- GNIS feature ID: 2409965
- Website: https://calverttx.gov/

Calvert is a city in Robertson County, Texas, United States. As of the 2020 census, the city population was 970. It is located approximately halfway between Waco and Bryan-College Station at the intersection of Texas State Highway 6 and Farm to Market Roads 979 and 1644, on the Southern Pacific line, nine miles north of Hearne, in west central Robertson County. For the last 35 years, Calvert has enjoyed a relative success as an antique "capital". The town is named for Robert Calvert, an early settler who served in the Texas Legislature representing Robertson and Milam counties.

== History ==
=== Founding & coming of the railroads ===
The earliest known white settler in the area was Joseph Harlan, whose 1837 land grant laid five miles south of what is now the City of Calvert. In 1850, Robert Calvert, for whom the town is named, established a plantation west of the town. Calvert, who was a former Texas Representative and area farmer urged the Houston and Texas Central Railway to build through the area. The Houston and Texas Central Railroad agreed to stop in the town, at the encouragement of town leaders, in 1868.

In January 1868, a group of investors purchased land at the townsite and platted the community; by February of that year, merchants from the nearby communities including Sterling and Owensville were uprooting and moving to the community. A post office also opened in Calvert in 1868. The first trains arrived in Calvert in 1869, and the town was incorporated the next year with an aldermanic form of municipal government. Although the Stroud family owned most of the land, the town was named for Robert Calvert because he was a driving force behind getting the railroad to stop in the town. The order of election for the incorporation of Calvert was issued July 5, 1869, but a majority actually voted against incorporation. This election was set aside because it was believed that "a fair expression of the qualified voters was not had," and a new election was held Saturday, July 24, 1869, a majority voted for incorporation, and the town was ordered incorporated on August 13, 1869.

After the railroad made Calvert the major trading center of the area, it was reported that:

It was a common sight to see six or eight wagons drawn by oxen slowly passing through the one and only street of these towns en route to Houston to dispose of their cotton. These wagons averaged ten miles a day. The team-masters usually owned their teams and were paid so much per hundred pounds for hauling freight.

=== Named as county seat ===
In 1870, as Reconstruction sparked political maneuvering in Robertson County, the former county seat of Owensville was replaced by Calvert. The town had been briefly occupied by federal troops early in 1870. Just nine years later, however, the voters of Robertson County voted to move the county seat to nearby Morgan, now named Franklin.

=== Development and decline ===
By 1871, the town claimed to have the largest cotton gin in the world. However, sources differ on when, exactly, the gin was built. The Handbook of Texas cites the 1871 date, while a 1931 Frontier Times piece on Calvert places the building of the gin by John H. Gibson as 1876. Eventually, P.C. and J.H. Gibson, Jr., took over the gin. It had 21 stands and a connected oil mill. The gin served a significant portion of the Brazos River bottoms. A total of 32,000 bales were reported received in 1882.

In 1873 a severe yellow fever epidemic killed many in the community, severely depopulating the town. An early judge, in speaking about the epidemic, noted:

The disease was brought to town by a traveling printer from Louisiana where the fever was raging. He took a room over the restaurant in the Bailey building and died there. As many persons as could made an exodus before the town was quarantined. We lost between three and four hundred persons. The fever was a terrible epidemic, and our people suffered because we did not know how to treat the disease. The trains were not allowed to stop in Calvert then and the windows of the coaches were closed until they were far out of town.

A county jail was built in 1875. By 1878, Calvert had 52 businesses. Today, the city of Calvert still exists as a Texas municipality

=== Modern controversies ===
In June 2015, a TV station reported that cities of Calvert, Franklin, Hearne and Lott, in a "Texas Triangle", were using their police departments to issue numerous speeding tickets to turn their municipal court into a "cash cow".

== Demographics ==
Historical population
Census	Pop.	Note	%±
1880	2,280		—
1890	2,632		15.4%
1900	3,322		26.2%
1910	2,579		−22.4%
1920	2,099		−18.6%
1930	2,103		0.2%
1940	2,366		12.5%
1950	2,548		7.7%
1960	2,073		−18.6%
1970	2,072		0.0%
1980	1,732		−16.4%
1990	1,536		−11.3%
2000	1,426		−7.2%
2010	1,192		−16.4%
2020	962		−19.3%
U.S. Decennial Census

Calvert is part of the Bryan-College Station metropolitan area.

=== Racial and ethnic composition ===
Calvert city, Texas – Racial and ethnic composition Note: the US Census treats Hispanic/Latino as an ethnic category. This table excludes Latinos from the racial categories and assigns them to a separate category. Hispanics/Latinos may be of any race.
Race / Ethnicity (NH = Non-Hispanic)	Pop 2000	Pop 2010	Pop 2020	% 2000	% 2010	% 2020
White alone (NH)	456	438	326	31.98%	36.74%	33.89%
Black or African American alone (NH)	745	585	482	52.24%	49.08%	50.10%
Native American or Alaska Native alone (NH)	6	0	3	0.42%	0.00%	0.31%
Asian alone (NH)	1	3	4	0.07%	0.25%	0.42%
Native Hawaiian or Pacific Islander alone (NH)	0	0	0	0.00%	0.00%	0.00%
Other race alone (NH)	0	4	3	0.00%	0.34%	0.31%
Mixed race or Multiracial (NH)	6	9	27	0.42%	0.76%	2.81%
Hispanic or Latino (any race)	212	153	117	14.87%	12.84%	12.16%
Total	1,426	1,192	962	100.00%	100.00%	100.00%

=== 2020 census ===
As of the 2020 census, Calvert had a population of 962, and the median age was 48.9 years. 20.5% of residents were under the age of 18 and 25.3% of residents were 65 years of age or older. For every 100 females there were 94.7 males, and for every 100 females age 18 and over there were 93.2 males age 18 and over.

0% of residents lived in urban areas, while 100.0% lived in rural areas.

There were 423 households in Calvert, of which 27.0% had children under the age of 18 living in them. Of all households, 32.6% were married-couple households, 23.6% were households with a male householder and no spouse or partner present, and 40.4% were households with a female householder and no spouse or partner present. About 35.9% of all households were made up of individuals and 16.8% had someone living alone who was 65 years of age or older.

There were 578 housing units, of which 26.8% were vacant. Among occupied housing units, 61.2% were owner-occupied and 38.8% were renter-occupied. The homeowner vacancy rate was 1.1% and the rental vacancy rate was 10.7%.

Racial composition as of the 2020 census
Race	Percent
White	38.0%
Black or African American	50.5%
American Indian and Alaska Native	0.4%
Asian	0.4%
Native Hawaiian and Other Pacific Islander	0%
Some other race	5.5%
Two or more races	5.1%

=== 2010 census ===
As of the 2010 United States census, there were 1,192 people, 509 households, and 374 families residing in the city. The population decreased to 1,180 residents in 2012. In 2010, the population density was 366.6 inhabitants per square mile (141.5/km^{2}), and there were 675 housing units at an average density of 186.6 per square mile (72.0/km^{2}).

The city's population was 36.7% White, 49.1% African American, 0.42% Native American, and 0.07% Asian. A total of 8.77% of residents are from other races, and 1.47% are from two or more races. Hispanic or Latino residents of any race constitute 16.3% of the population.

Of the 584 households in the city, 27.4% of households had children under the age of 18, 34.7% were married couples living together, 25.4% were households led by single females, and 34.7% were non-related groups. A total of 32.4% of all households in the city consisted of individuals and 16.6% of households were single people at least 65 years old. The average household size was 2.44 people and the average family size was 3.07 people.

A total of 20.7% of residents were under the age of 18, 7.1% were between the ages of 18 and 24, 21.9% were between 25 and 44, 22.1% were between 45 and 64, and 19.1% were at least 65 years of age. The median age was 38 years of age. For every 100 female residents there were 85.2 male residents, but for every 100 female residents age 18 and over, there were only 78.0 male residents.

The median household income was $18,105, and the median family income was $23,214. Median income for males was $24,722 and $17,885 for females. The per capita income for the city was $13,165. About 30.3% of families and 36.9% of the population are below the poverty line, including 53.4% of residents under age 18 and 32.6% of those age 65 or over.

== Attractions ==
- Calvert Historic District
- Katy Hamman-Stricker Women's Heritage Center – Historic library and museum honoring the efforts of the American Woman's League in Calvert.

== Government ==
Calvert is served by Calvert Police Department, Calvert Fire Department, and Robertson County EMS. The city currently has a mayor (Layla Hensarling Wright) and council form of government with a police chief, city attorney, and city secretary.

A former Calvert mayor, Briscoe Rowell Cain, Sr. (1931–2011), was the grandfather of Texas State Representative, House District 128, Republican Briscoe Cain, III, a lawyer from Harris County.

== Education ==
The city's schools are part of the Calvert Independent School District.

== Media ==
The Robertson County News and "Central Texas Star Independent news media" reports the local news.

== Photo gallery ==
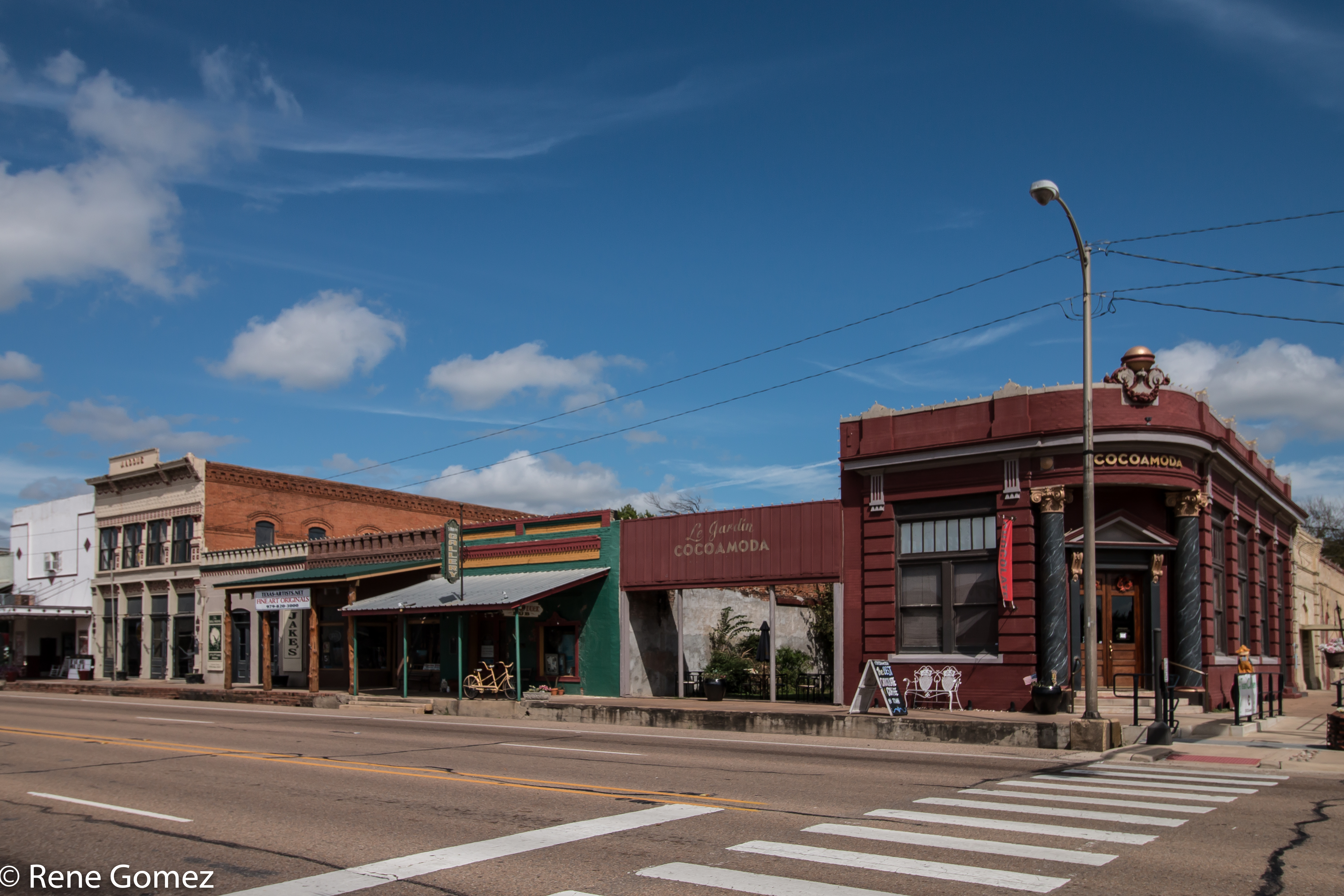
Downtown Calvert

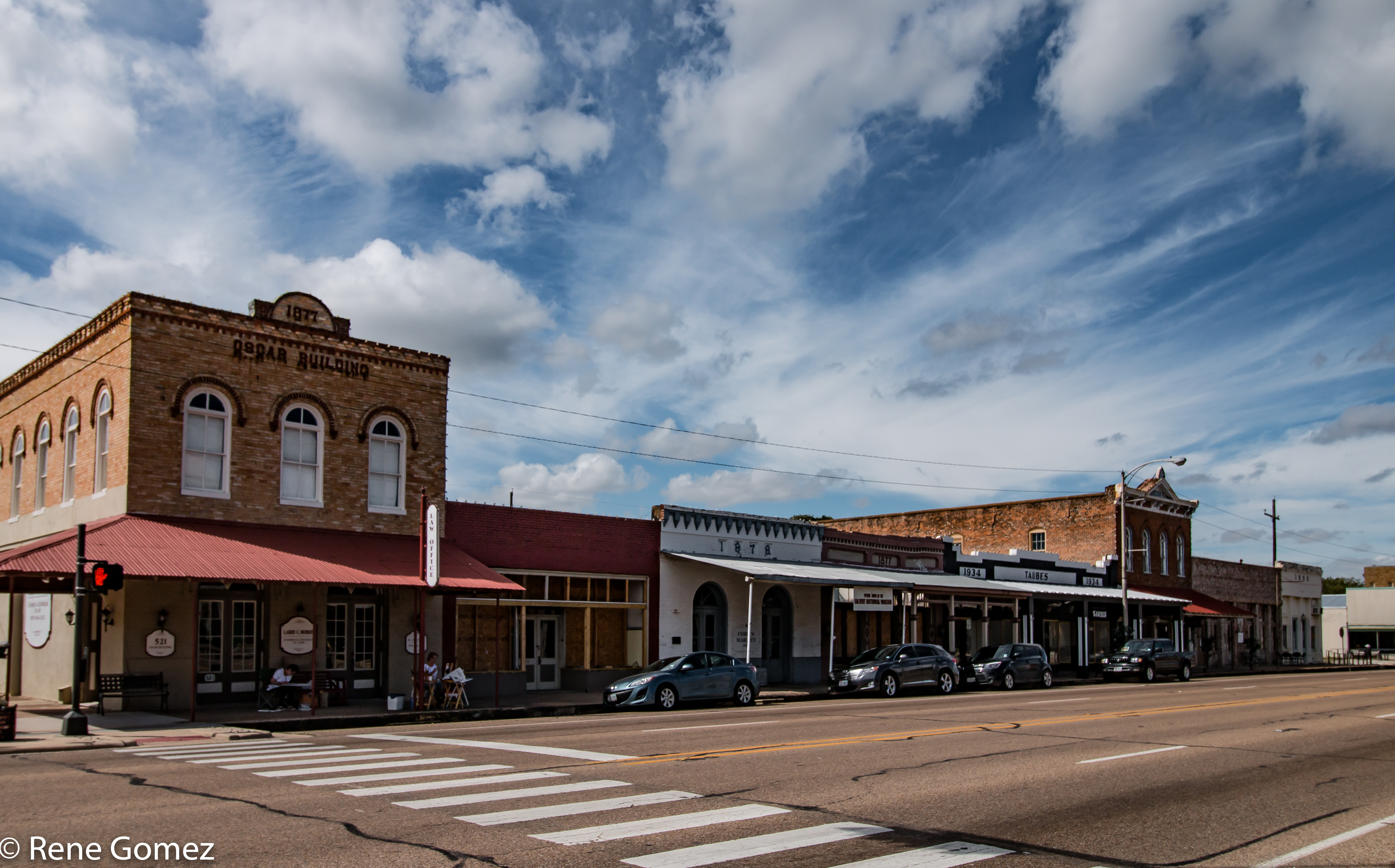
Downtown Calvert

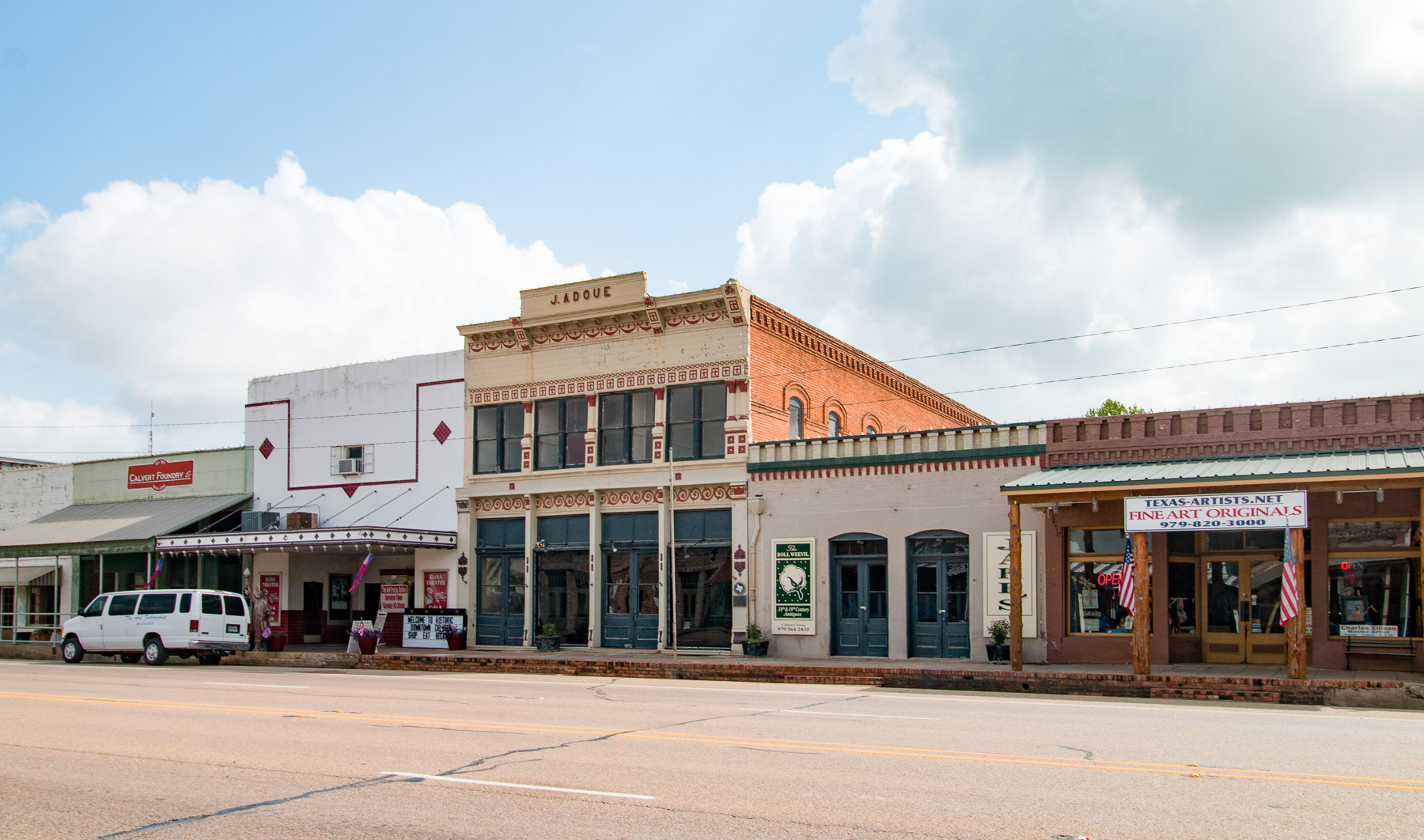
Downtown Calvert

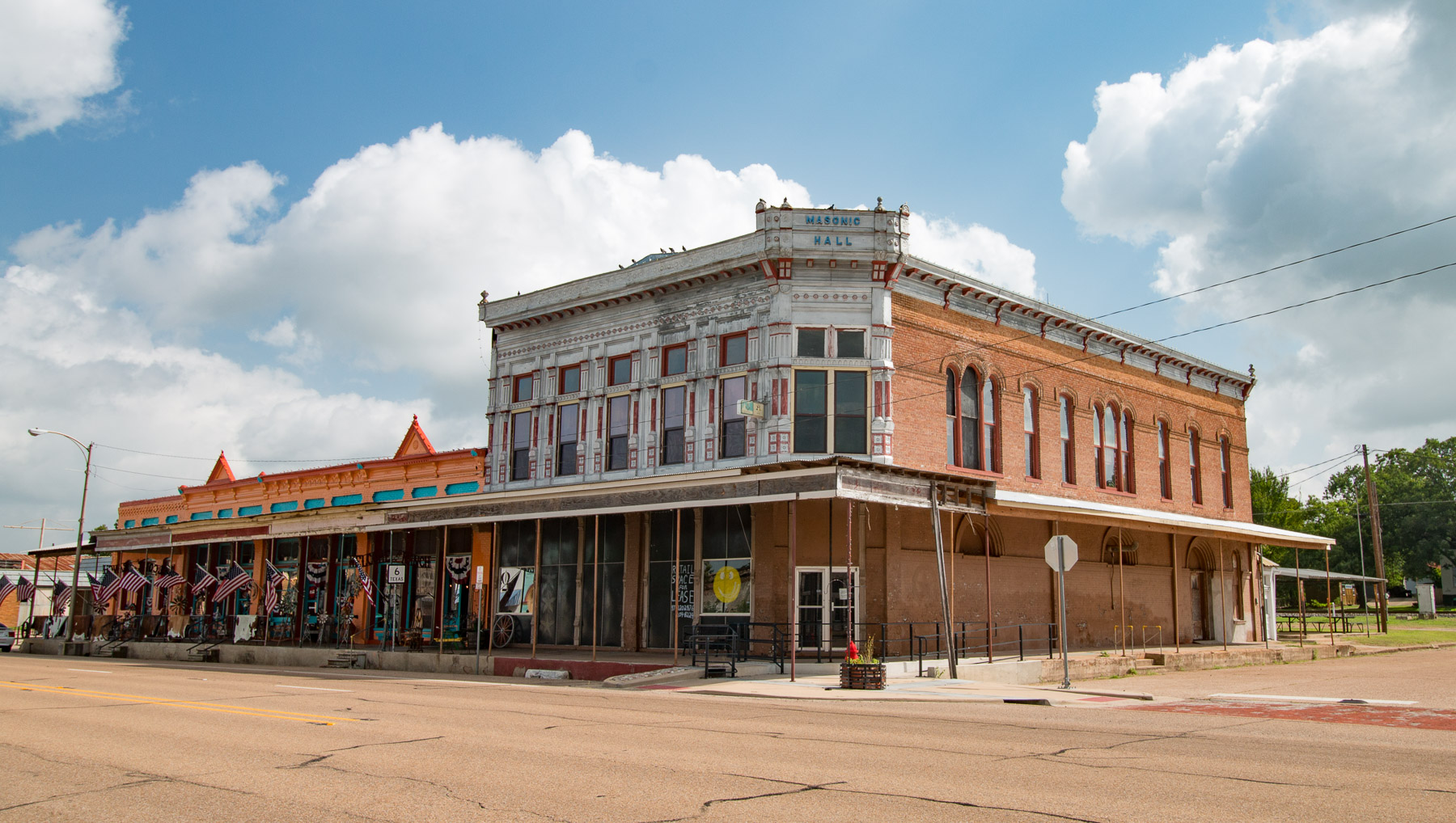
Masonic Lodge in Calvert, Texas

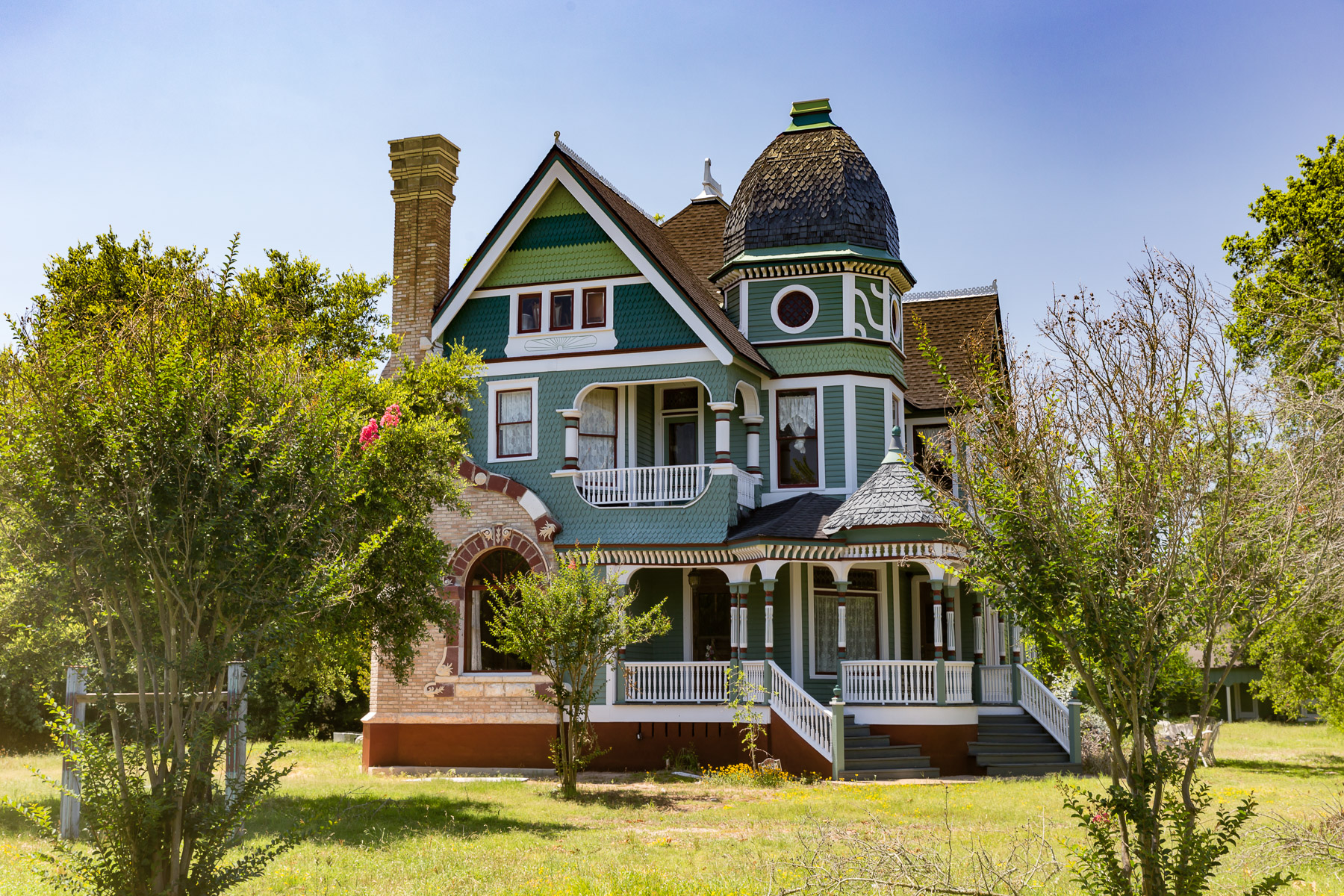
Parrish House

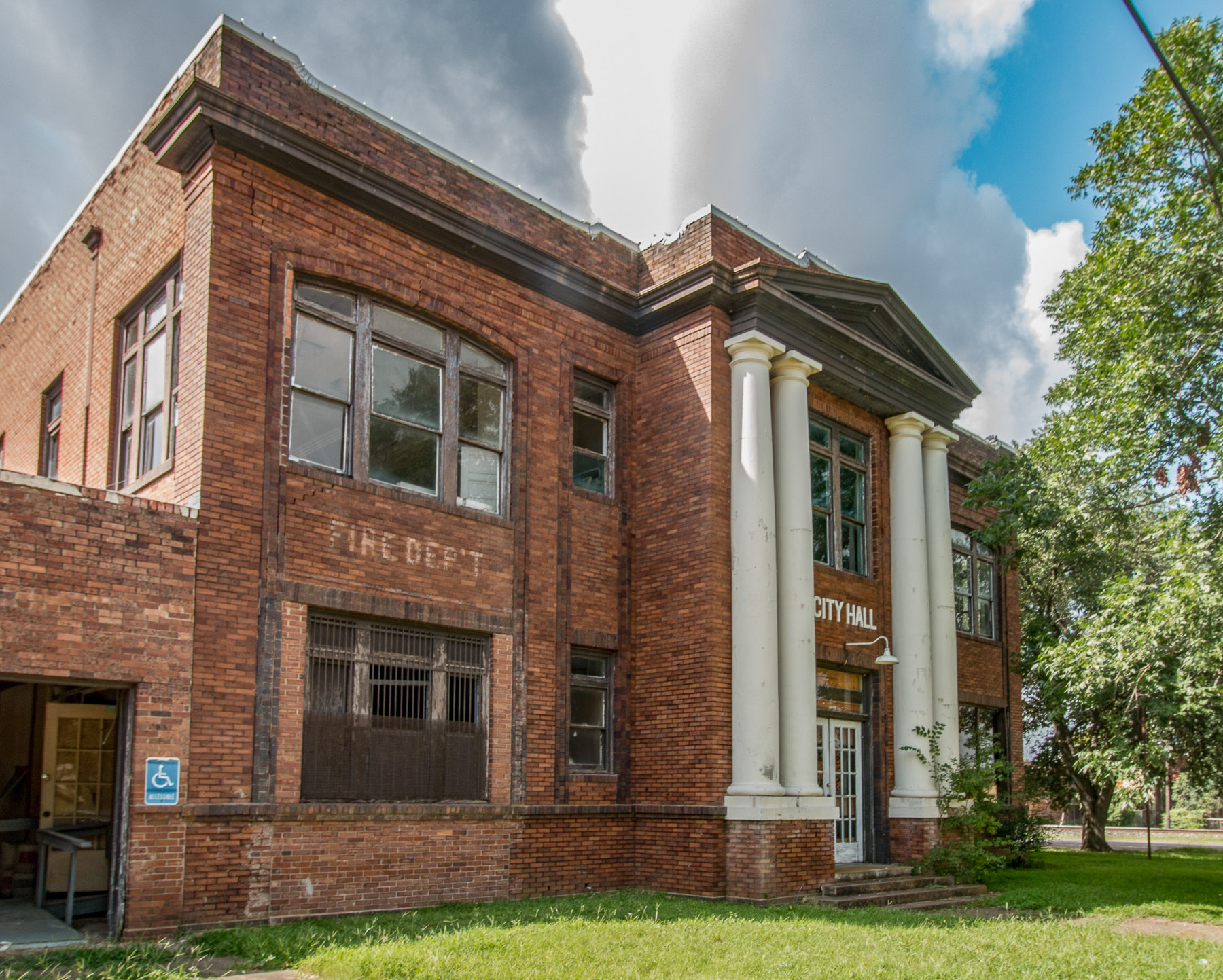
Old Calvert City Hall

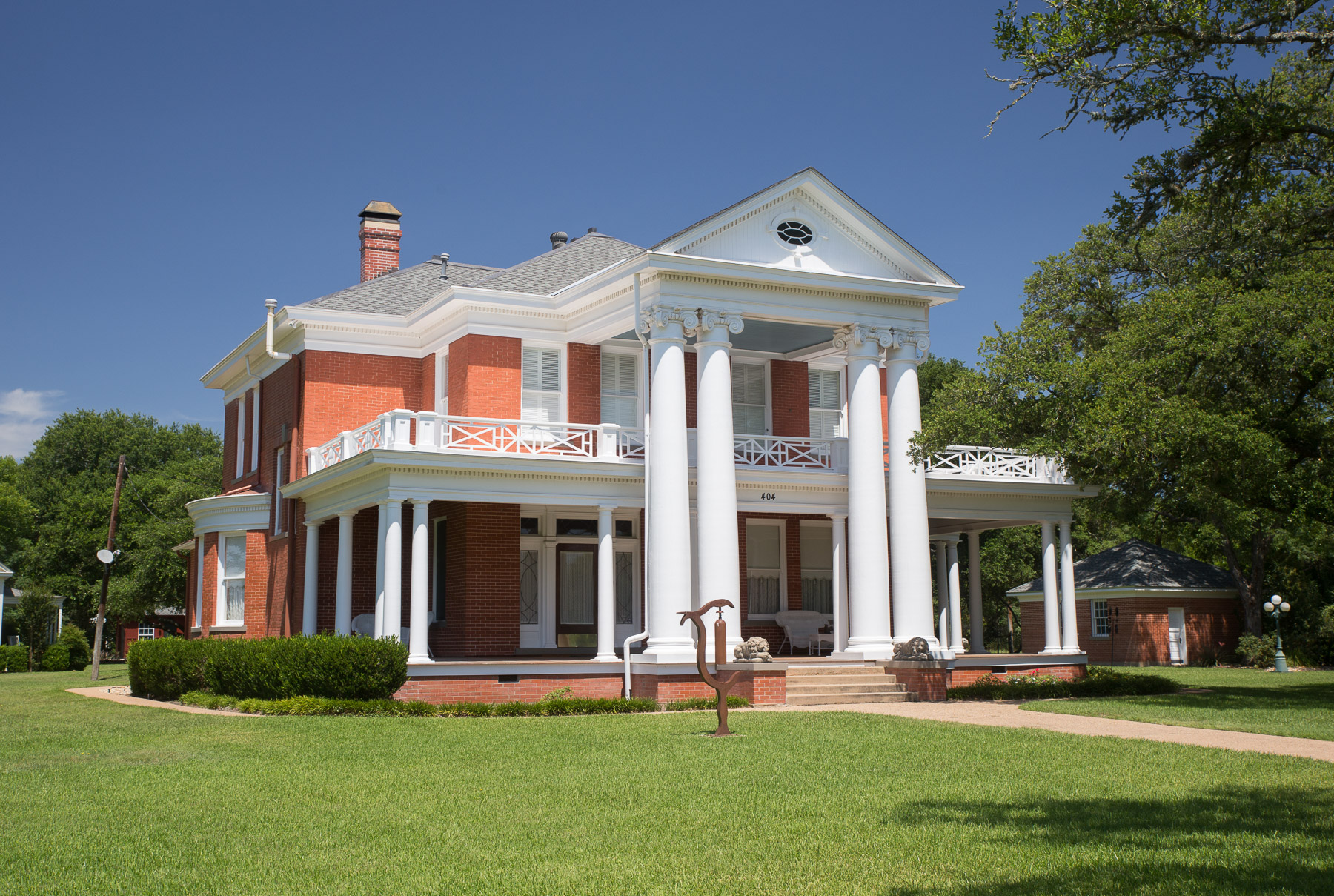
Barton Home

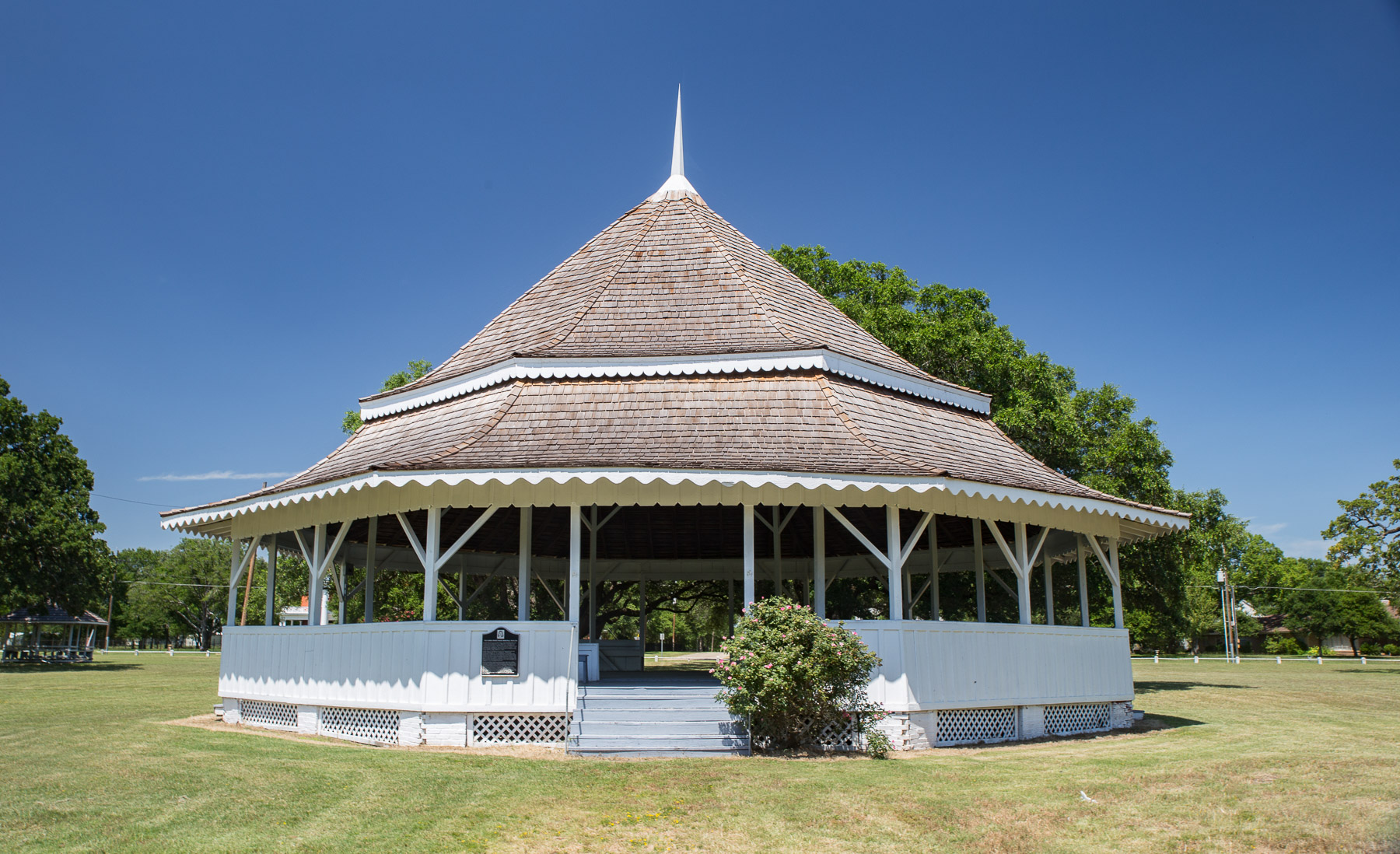
Wiese Memorial Pavilion

== Notable people ==
- Chalie Boy, rapper
- Tom Bradley, Mayor of Los Angeles, California from 1973 to 1993
- Bill Foster, Hall of Fame pitcher in the Negro Leagues
- Rube Foster, baseball player, manager and pioneer executive in the Negro leagues
- Tex McCrary, originator of the talk-show format, radio personality, adviser to presidents
- Joe Sneed, U.S. federal judge
- Reverend L.T. Thomas, preacher and artist
