= The All New Popeye Hour =

American animated television series

- logo
- Genre: Comedy
- Based on: Popeye by E. C. Segar
- Directed by: Ray Patterson (seasons 1–2); Carl Urbano (seasons 1–2, 4); Oscar Dufau (season 2); George Gordon (seasons 2, 4); Chris Cuddington (season 3); Rudy Zamora (season 4)
- Voices of: Jack Mercer; Marilyn Schreffler; Allan Melvin; Daws Butler; Don Messick; Hal Smith; John Stephenson; Jo Ann Worley
- Theme music composer: Sammy Lerner (arranged by Hoyt Curtin)
- Opening theme: "I'm Popeye the Sailor Man"
- Composer: Hoyt Curtin
- Country of origin: United States
- Original language: English
- No. of seasons: 4
- No. of episodes: 56 (164 segments)

Production
- Executive producers: William Hanna; Joseph Barbera
- Producers: Alex Lovy (seasons 1–2, special); Art Scott (seasons 3–4)
- Editors: Gil Iverson; Peter Jennings (season 1); Robert Ciaglia (seasons 1–3, special)
- Production companies: Hanna-Barbera Productions; King Features Entertainment

Original release
- Network: CBS
- Release: September 9, 1978 – September 5, 1983

Related
- Popeye and Son (1987)

The All New Popeye Hour is an American animated television series produced by Hanna-Barbera Productions and King Features Entertainment. Starring the comic strip character Popeye, the series aired from 1978 to 1983 on Saturday mornings on CBS. Despite the series' mixed reception (mostly being criticized for its cheap animation, writing and PSAs), it was a hit for King Features Entertainment.

== Production ==
The show was produced by Hanna-Barbera Productions, which tried to retain the style of the original Thimble Theatre comic strip while complying with the prevailing content restrictions on violence. Featured characters, aside from the popular main stars of Popeye, Bluto, Olive Oyl and Wimpy, were Swee'Pea, Poopdeck Pappy, Eugene the Jeep and Popeye's quadruplet nephews. Popeye's outfit reverted to his original blue sailor's uniform, except for his white hat, which retained the "Dixie cup" style featured in his white United States Navy uniform. Bluto's name was restored, as it had been changed to "Brutus" for the early 1960s Popeye cartoons because of an incorrect understanding by King Features over who owned the rights to the character. Olive Oyl also reverted to her 1930s look.

At the start, The All New Popeye Hour had three segments: "Popeye", "Popeye's Treasure Hunt" and "Dinky Dog", a non-Popeye segment about the misadventures of an enormous sheepdog that was later spun off into its own show. In 1979, the show added "The Popeye Sports Parade".

Because of restrictions on violence on television cartoons for children at the time, Popeye did not throw punches in retaliation to Bluto; he often lifted him, with his own hands or with machinery, and hurled him away. The series marked the last time Jack Mercer would voice Popeye; he died on December 4, 1984, fifteen months after the show's cancellation. Unlike most other cartoon series produced by Hanna-Barbera in the 1970s, The All New Popeye Hour did not contain a laugh track.

Each episode also contains a PSA interstitial called a Safety Tip or a Health Tip about things that include but are not limited to: washing hands before dinner, brushing teeth, nutrition, crossing the street the right way, protection against sunburn, and spray paint safety. Some Safety Tips feature an anthropomorphic wolf named Mr. No-No who would engage in dangerous or destructive activities like consuming toxic substances, drinking alcohol, smoking, and recreational drug use. He would tend to get Pipeye, Peepeye, Poopeye, and Pupeye to do the same until he is either stopped in some way or turned away by Popeye.

During the time the series was in production, CBS aired the half-hour special The Popeye Valentine Special: Sweethearts at Sea on February 14, 1979.

The All New Popeye Hour ran on CBS until September 1981, when it was shortened to a half-hour show and retitled The Popeye and Olive Comedy Show. The show added two new segments. The first segment was "Prehistoric Popeye", which is similar to The Flintstones. The second segment was "Private Olive Oyl", where Olive and Alice the Goon join the Army, then proceed to drive their drill instructor, Sgt. Bertha Blast (voiced by Jo Anne Worley) nuts, yet impress the base commander, Col. Crumb (voiced by Hal Smith). This cartoon is based on the idea of Private Benjamin; Hanna-Barbera was also concurrently producing a virtually identical concept with sitcom characters Laverne and Shirley called Laverne and Shirley in the Army for rival network ABC at the time.

The show was removed from the CBS lineup in September 1983, and the cartoons were immediately sold to local stations in nationwide syndication as The All New Popeye Show. They have also been released on VHS and DVD. The syndicated version can currently be seen on Amazon Prime Video, Tubi (as "Popeye: The Continuing Adventures") and on YouTube (as "All-New Popeye").

== Voice cast ==
In addition to providing many of the cartoon scripts, Jack Mercer reprised his voice as Popeye, while Marilyn Schreffler and Allan Melvin became the new voices of Olive Oyl and Bluto, respectively (Mae Questel was asked by Hanna-Barbera to recreate Olive Oyl, but she declined due to scheduling conflicts). It would ultimately serve as Mercer's final work (apart from a brief voice cameo in the 1980 live-action film).

=== Main ===
- Jack Mercer as Popeye, Poopdeck Pappy, Pipeye, Peepeye
- Allan Melvin as Bluto
- Marilyn Schreffler as Olive Oyl, The Sea Hag, Swee'Pea, Alice the Goon, Poopeye, Pupeye
- Julie Bennett as Monica
- Daws Butler as Wimpy
- Jackie Joseph as Sandy
- Don Messick as Eugene the Jeep
- Frank Nelson as Uncle Dudley
- Hal Smith as Col. Crumb
- John Stephenson as Mr. No No
- Frank Welker as Dinky
- Jo Anne Worley as Sgt. Bertha Blast

=== Additional ===
- Roger Behr
- Ted Cassidy
- Richard Erdman
- Joan Gerber
- Ross Martin
- Virginia McSwain
- Pat Parris
- Barney Phillips
- Jane Roberts
- William Schallert
- Jean Vander Pyl
- Janet Waldo
- Lennie Weinrib

== Episodes ==
=== Season 1 (1978) ===
No. overall	No. in season	Title	Written by	Original release date
1	1	"A Bad Knight for Popeye/Ballet-Hooey/The Big Wheel"	Unknown	September 9, 1978
2	2	"Bluto's Bike Bullies/Boola Boola Hula (Note: Episodes that are part of Popeye's Treasure Hunt.)/Bully Dozer"	TBA	TBA
3	3	"A Camping We Will Go/Captain Meno's Sunken Treasure/Chips Off the Old Ice Block"	TBA	TBA
4	4	"Close Encounters of the Third Spinach/Coldfinger/The Crunch for Lunch Bunch"	TBA	TBA
5	5	"A Day at Muscle Beach/A Day at the Rodeo/The Decathlon Dilemna"	TBA	TBA
6	6	"The Delmonica Diamond/Free Hauling Brawl/Getting Popeye's Goat"	TBA	TBA
7	7	"Heir-Brained Popeye/Here Stew You/A Horse of a Flying Color"	TBA	TBA
8	8	"I Left My Spinach in San Francisco/I Wants Me Mummy/The Loneliness of the Long Distance Popeye"	TBA	TBA
9	9	"The Mask of Gorgonzola/Mother Goose Is on the Loose/Olive's Shining Hour"	TBA	TBA
10	10	"Play It Again, Popeye/Polly Wants Some Spinach/Popeye's Engine Company"	TBA	TBA
11	11	"Popeye's Finest Hour/Popeye's Roots/Popeye and Bigfoot"	TBA	TBA
12	12	"Popeye and the Beanstalk/Popeye and the Pest/Popeye and the Pirates"	TBA	TBA
13	13	"Popeye at the Center of the Earth/Popeye of the Klondike/Popeye the Carpenter"	TBA	TBA
14	14	"Popeye the Carpenter/Popeye the Plumber/Popeye the Robot"	TBA	TBA
15	15	"Popeye the Sleepwalker/Popeye Goes Hollywood/Popeye Goes Sailing"	TBA	TBA
16	16	"Popeye Goes Sightseeing/Popeye Meets the Blutostein Monster/Popeye Out West"	TBA	TBA
17	17	"Popeye Snags the Seahag/Popeye Versus Machine/A Seal with Appeal"	TBA	TBA
18	18	"Shark Treatment/Ship Ahoy/Ship Ahoy"	TBA	TBA
19	19	"The Ski's the Limit/The Spinach Bowl/Spinach Fever"	TBA	TBA
20	20	"Spring Daze in Paris/Steeple Chase at Ups and DownsThe Sword of Fitzwilly/Take Me Out to the Brawl Game"	TBA	TBA
21	21	"The Terrifyink Transylvanian Treasure Trek/The Three Ring Ding-a-Ling/The Three Ring Ding-a-Ling"	TBA	TBA
22	22	"The Treasure of Howe's Bayou/The Treasure of Werner Schnitzel/A Trio in Rio"	TBA	TBA
23	23	"A Whale of a Tale/Whotsa Matterhorn?/Wilder Than Usual Blue Yonder"	TBA	TBA
24	24	"Yukon County Mountie"	TBA	TBA

=== Special (1979) ===
Title	Directed by	Written by	Storyboarded by	Original release date
"The Popeye Valentine Special: Sweethearts at Sea"	Oscar Dufau	Tom Dagenais and Jack Hanrahan	George Singer and Paul Sommer	February 14, 1979

=== Season 2 (1979) ===
No. overall	No. in season	Title	Written by	Original release date
25	1	"Bad Day at the Bakery/Boo Who/Building Blockheads"	TBA	TBA
26	2	"En Un Lugar De La Mancha/Fantastic Gymnastics (Note: Episodes that are part of The Popeye Sports Parade.)/The Game"	TBA	TBA
27	3	"The Great Decathlon Championship/King of the Rodeo/Love on the Rocks"	TBA	TBA
28	4	"Old McPopeye Had a Farm/Olive's Bugged House Blues/On Mule-itary Detail"	TBA	TBA
29	5	"Paddle Wheel Popeye/Pedal-Powered-Popeye/Plunder Down Under"	TBA	TBA
30	6	"Popeye's Aqua Circus/Popeye's High School Daze/Popeye's Poodle Problem"	TBA	TBA
31	7	"Popeye in Wonderland/Popeye the Painter/Queen of the Load"	TBA	TBA
32	8	"The Reel Hollywood Treasure Hunt/Roller Rink-a-Dink/Sky High Fly Try"	TBA	TBA
33	9	"Swee'Pea Plagues a Parade/Take It or Lump It/Tough Sledding"	TBA	TBA
34	10	"Water Ya Doin'?/Westward Ho! Ho!"	TBA	TBA

=== Season 3 (1980) ===
No. overall	No. in season	Title	Written by	Original release date
35	1	"Abject Flying Object/Alpine for You/Around the World in 80 Hours"	TBA	TBA
36	2	"Bad Company/Beyond the Spinach Brick Road/Cliff Hanger"	TBA	TBA
37	3	"Dublin or Nothin'/Forum or Against 'Em/A Goon Gone Gooney"	TBA	TBA
38	4	"The Great Speckled Whale/Hail, Hail, the Ganges All Here/In a Little Spinach Town"	TBA	TBA
39	5	"I Wouldn't Take That Mare to the Fair on a Dare/Merry Madness at the Mardi Gras/No Fuel Like an Old Fuel"	TBA	TBA
40	6	"Olive Goes Dallas/Pappy Fails in Love/Peask and Quiet"	TBA	TBA
41	7	"Popeye's Perilous Pursuit of a Pearl/Popeye's Self Defense/Popeye of Sherwood Forest"	TBA	TBA
42	8	"Popeye of the Jungle/Popeye the Lone Legionnaire/Popeye Stumps Bluto"	TBA	TBA
43	9	"Popierre the Musketeer/Ships That Pass in the Fright/Spa-ing Partners"	TBA	TBA
44	10	"Top Kick in Boot Camp/Tour Each His Own/The Umpire Strikes Back"	TBA	TBA
45	11	"Unidentified Fighting Object/W.O.I.L."	TBA	TBA

=== Season 4: The Popeye and Olive Comedy Show (1981–83) ===
No. overall	No. in season	Title	Written by	Original release date
46	1	"Reptile Ranch (Note: Episodes that are part of Prehistoric Popeye.) / Mission Improbable (Note: Episodes that are part of Private Olive Oyl.) / So Who's Watching the Bird Watchers"	Glenn Leopold Cliff Roberts Tom Yakutis	TBA
47	2	"Computer Chaos / Chilly Con Caveman / Here Today - Goon Tomorrow"	Glenn Leopold Glenn Leopold and Cliff Roberts Glenn Leopold	TBA
48	3	"Come Back, Little Stegosaurus / Troop Therapy / Olive's Devastatingk Decorators"	Cliff Roberts Glenn Leopold Tom Dagenais	TBA
49	4	"Goon Native / Cheap Skate Date / Alice in Blunderland"	Glenn Leopold Doug Booth Cliff Roberts	TBA
50	5	"Neanderthal Nuisance / Wreck Room / The Incredible Shrinking Popeye"	Glenn Leopold Frances Novier, Cliff Roberts, and Glenn Leopold Glenn Leopold	TBA
51	6	"Private Secretaries / The First Resort / Goon Balloon"	Cliff Roberts Cliff Roberts and Glenn Leopold Glenn Leopold	TBA
52	7	"Vegetable Stew / Tanks a Lot / Winner Window Washer"	Coslough Johnson, Glenn Leopold, and Cliff Roberts Glenn Leopold Bryce Malek	TBA
53	8	"Rocky Rolls / Hogwash at the Car Wash / Snow Fooling"	Cliff Roberts Gary Greenfield Cliff Roberts and Glenn Leopold	TBA
54	9	"Bronto Beach / Infink-try / The Midnight Ride of Popeye Revere"	Cliff Roberts Glenn Leopold	TBA
55	10	"Goon Hollywood / Popeye Stumps Bluto (Note: Rerun of an episode from the Season 3.) / Basic Train-ing"	Glenn Leopold and Cliff Roberts Unknown Glenn Leopold and Cliff Roberts	TBA
56	11	"Up a Lizard River / Jeep Thrills / Olive's Moving Experience"	Glenn Leopold Bryce Malek	September 5, 1983

== Home media ==
The first DVD that features The All New Popeye Hour was released on May 16, 2000, by Rhino Home Video with eighteen segments from the series. A few years later, Warner Home Video released Popeye & Friends - Volume One, a single DVD featuring eight unedited episodes. As of 2026, the series has yet to have a complete series DVD box set.
