= Sea Hag =

Fictional character from Popeye

- Art by E. C. Segar

Publication information
- Publisher: King Features Syndicate
- First appearance: Thimble Theatre (December 26, 1929)
- Created by: E. C. Segar
- Voiced by: Mae Questel (1960s); Marilyn Schreffler (1970s); Richard Steven Horvitz (1998); Kathy Bates (2004)

The Sea Hag is a cartoon character owned by King Features Syndicate. She is a tall witch featured in comics and cartoons as a nemesis to the character Popeye. The Sea Hag was created by Elzie Crisler Segar in 1929 as part of the Thimble Theatre comic strip.

== Character history ==
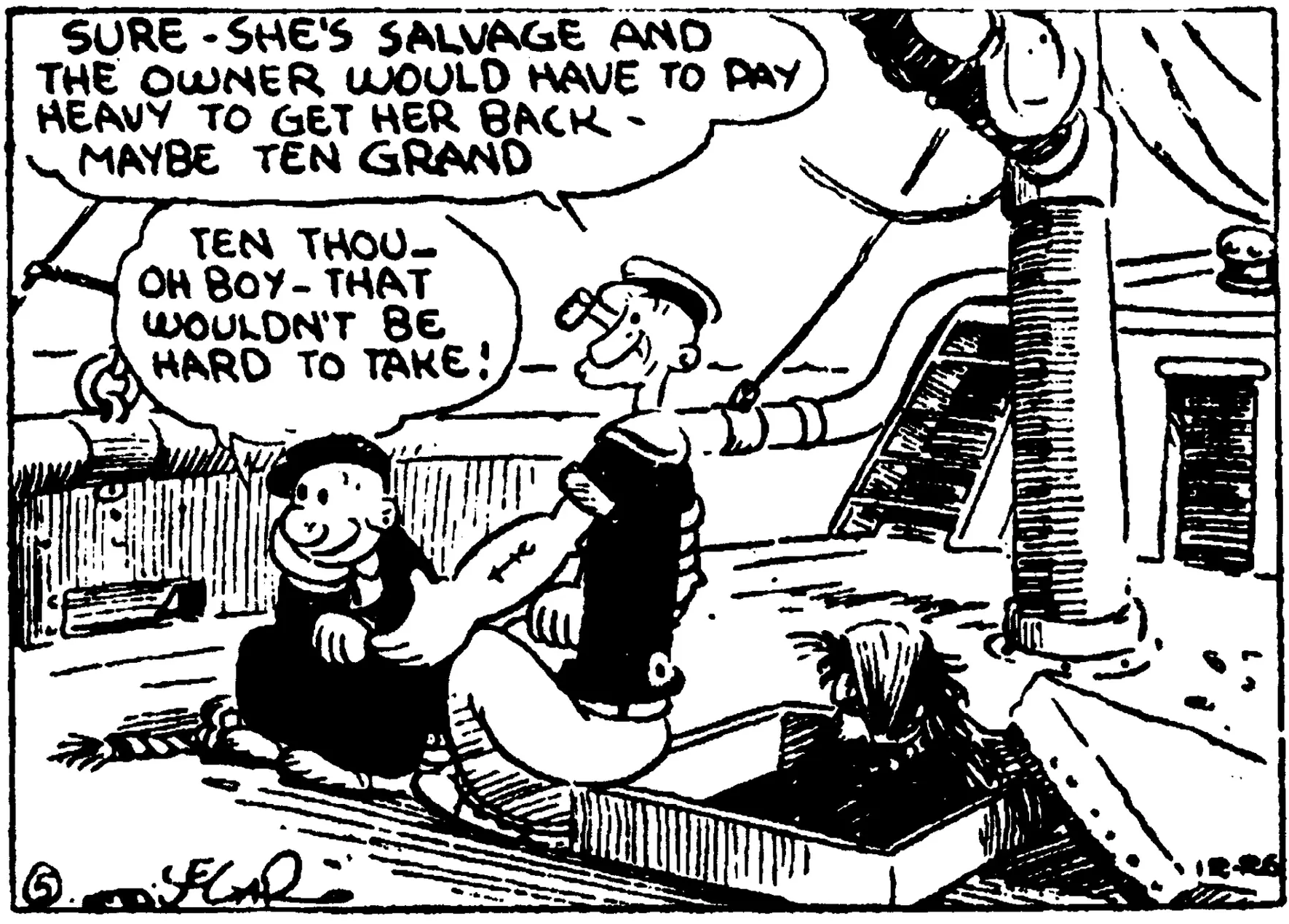
Sea Hag in the Thimble Theatre strip from December 26, 1929, her first appearance.

The Sea Hag is one of the central enemies of Popeye the Sailor. She is the last witch on earth, and a pirate who sails the Seven Seas in her ship "The Black Barnacle". She has a headquarters on Plunder Island, where she keeps a pride of lions that she uses to dispatch her enemies. She also has a deep knowledge of magic artifacts, and has used many of them to great effect over the years. She is able to practice Voodoo magic and powerful enough to capture the equally magical Eugene the Jeep (though in the 1961 cartoon "Myskery Melody" she declares her magic is powerless against him, and is subsequently shown running as Eugene attacks her with magical electricity from his tail), and on one occasion Santa Claus. She can even alter her appearance to that of her alter ego, "Rose of the Sea". The Sea Hag has a pet vulture named Bernard as her familiar. Bernard is abnormally strong and can easily carry a human in flight. The Sea Hag also commands an army of Goons. The most famous of the Goons is Alice the Goon.

Because she is a woman, Popeye cannot physically attack her. His honor says that he would never hit a woman, even someone as evil as the Sea Hag. In such cases, it is Olive Oyl herself who steps in and does physical damage to her. One notable exception to this is in the 1960s cartoon "Old Salt Tale", where Popeye grabs her whip and uses it to fling her into the sea.

Upon meeting Popeye, she falls madly in love with him. Discovering that Popeye already has a girlfriend named Olive Oyl, she tries her best to be rid of Olive and win Popeye over to her favor. Popeye makes it clear to her though that under no circumstances would he be interested in a relationship with her. Enraged, on one occasion she gave Popeye's archenemy Bluto a potion to become young and handsome as a means to win Olive Oyl's heart. Later after thinking that the Sea Hag had died, Popeye had this to say once he discovered that she wasn't: "I yam glad she ain't dead even if she is a exter bad woman. If they wasn't no bad women, maybe we wouldn't appreciate the good ones. Anyway, she yam what she yam!" Despite this, the Sea Hag has tried to kill Popeye on occasion when upset that Popeye remains uninterested in her romantically.

Some 1960s comics had the Sea Hag being the mother of Bluto, although this relationship wasn't mentioned in subsequent stories.

When he took over the strip, new writer/artist Randy Milholland introduced an intern, Linden, for the Sea Hag. Linden is a young non-binary person with an interest in the mystical arts, so they have become the Sea Hag's "intern", or apprentice in the secrets of witchcraft. However, they are most often seen performing various chores at the Hag's lair. Linden is also a member of the LGBT community, having mentioned only dating girls, and has been shown to be in a relationship with Sutra Oyl.

== Other media ==
- In the 1960s, the Sea Hag made her television debut in Popeye the Sailor. She was voiced by actress Mae Questel, who also provided the voice for Olive Oyl and Swee'Pea.
- In 1978, the Sea Hag appeared in The All-New Popeye Hour animated series. She was voiced by actress Marilyn Schreffler, who also provided the voice of Olive Oyl, Swee'Pea and two of Popeye's nephews.
- She appears in the first episode of Popeye and Son, where she comes to collect a driftwood mermaid that fell off her ship. Bluto had taken it, and used it as a key decoration for his yacht party. The Sea Hag tries to sink the boat with numerous guests on board to reclaim it. Popeye's son Junior, after eating spinach, boards the ship and throws the hag her mermaid back.
- In the 1982 Nintendo arcade game Popeye, the Sea Hag appears on higher stages to throw bottles at Popeye, and her vulture Bernard attacks Popeye during the third stage.
- In 2004, actress Kathy Bates performed the voice of the Sea Hag/Siren for the 3D CGI animated feature Popeye's Voyage: The Quest for Pappy, where she acts as the main antagonist. The storyline follows Popeye's journey to find his long-lost father Poopdeck Pappy in time for the holidays. As he sails the treacherous Seas of Mystery, he encounters the villainous Sea Hag who is smitten by the hulking seaman and vows to stop at nothing until she steals him away.
