= Popeye the Sailor (TV series) =

- Genre: Comedy
- Based on: Popeye, created by E. C. Segar
- Directed by: Jack Kinney (for Jack Kinney Productions); Seymour Kneitel (for Paramount Cartoon Studios); Gene Deitch and John Dunn (for Rembrandt Films/Halas and Batchelor); Paul Fennell (for Larry Harmon Pictures)
- Voices of: Jack Mercer; Mae Questel; Jackson Beck
- Theme music composer: Sammy Lerner (Original); Winston Sharples (Intro and Outro)
- Composers: Ken Lowman (for Jack Kinney Productions); Winston Sharples (for Paramount Cartoon Studios); Steven Konichek (for Rembrandt Films/Halas and Batchelor); Gordon Zahler (for Larry Harmon Pictures)
- Country of origin: United States
- Original language: English
- No. of episodes: 220

Production
- Executive producer: Al Brodax
- Producers: Jack Kinney; Paramount Cartoon Studios; William L. Snyder; Larry Harmon; Gerald Ray
- Editors: Joe Siracusa, Roger Donley, and Cliff Millsap (for Jack Kinney Productions); Dan Milner (for Larry Harmon Pictures); Norm Vizents (for Gerald Ray Studios)
- Running time: 5–7 minutes
- Production company: King Features Syndicate (Note: Animation outsourced to Paramount Cartoon Studios, Rembrandt Films, Halas and Batchelor, Larry Harmon Pictures, Gerald Ray Studios, Jack Kinney Productions and Format Films)

Original release
- Network: Syndication
- Release: June 10, 1960 – April 23, 1963

Popeye the Sailor is an American animated television series produced for King Features Syndicate TV starring Popeye that was released between 1960 and 1963 with 220 episodes produced. The episodes were produced by multiple animation studios and aired in broadcast syndication until the 1990s.

== Production ==
In the late 1950s, the original Popeye the Sailor theatrical shorts released by Paramount Pictures from 1933 to 1957 began airing in many television markets and garnered huge ratings. King Features Syndicate, which owned the rights to the Popeye character, did not earn any money from the syndication of the theatrical shorts. In order to capitalize on Popeye's television popularity, King Features hastily commissioned a new series of made-for-TV Popeye animated shorts. Al Brodax served as executive producer of the cartoons for King Features' then-newly created television production and distribution division (known today as Hearst Entertainment, named after King Features' parent company, Hearst Communications). Jack Mercer, Mae Questel and Jackson Beck returned for this series, which was produced by several different animation companies, including Larry Harmon Pictures, Rembrandt Films, Halas and Batchelor, Gerald Ray Studios, and Jack Kinney Productions. Famous Studios, which produced the theatrical entries from 1942 to 1957, also returned, although by this point it had been renamed Paramount Cartoon Studios.

The series was produced using limited animation techniques, whose production values contrasted sharply to the theatrical shorts. The artwork was streamlined, simplified for television budgets, and the entries were completed at a breakneck pace; 220 made-for-television cartoons were produced in two years. In contrast, 231 theatrical cartoons were produced over 24 years. Several minor changes were made for the characters. Though World War II had ended 15 years earlier, Popeye still retained his white US Navy uniform as had been the case for post-war theatrical shorts. Olive Oyl's appearance was a hybrid of different incarnations; while her outfit reverted to the Fleischer years of a red turtleneck, long black skirt and huge shoes, her hair retained the mid/late 1940s and 1950s makeover initiated by Famous Studios. Notably, the short "Barbecue for Two" uses the designs from the earlier theatrical shorts.

The biggest change was to Bluto, whose name was changed to "Brutus". At the time, King Features mistakenly believed that Paramount owned the rights to the name "Bluto", but the character had been originally created for the comic strip. However, due to their misunderstanding, the character was renamed Brutus to avoid supposed copyright infringement problems. Realizing their mistake, King Features began to promote Brutus as an entirely new character. His demeanor was altered slightly, and his physical appearance was changed from being muscular to slightly obese. In addition, his sailor uniform was replaced with a regular blue shirt and brown pants. (In later years, the newspaper comic strip brought back the original Bluto alongside Brutus, presenting them as brothers.)

Many entries lifted storylines directly from the comic strip, resulting in the inclusion of many characters not seen in the theatrical releases, including the Sea Hag, Toar, Rough House, and King Blozo. Like their theatrical counterparts, the made-for-television series was also a big ratings success. Popeye the Sailor aired in syndication in the United States into the 1990s. Notably, the 1960s shorts marked the final time that Mae Questel voiced Olive Oyl in a regularly-airing production, although she did the voice in a commercial for the arcade game based on the series in 1983 and in various interviews until she retired.

== Voice cast ==
- Jack Mercer as Popeye, Wimpy, Poopdeck Pappy, King Blozo, Additional voices
- Mae Questel as Olive, Swee'Pea, Sea Hag, Alice the Goon, Diesel Oyl
- Jackson Beck as Brutus, Toar, O. G. Wotasnozzle, Rough House, Additional voices

== Episodes ==
=== Larry Harmon Pictures ===
Note: The stories of all episodes are written by Charlie Shows.

No.	Title	Original release date
1	"Muskels Shmuskels"	1 September 1960
Popeye runs afoul of circus heavyweight Brutus.
2	"Hoppy Jalopy"	2 September 1960
Popeye races to save Olive from Brutus, who places death traps around the track.
3	"Dead-Eye Popeye"	2 September 1960
4	"Mueller's Mad Monster"	2 September 1960
Popeye and Olive tangle with a mad scientist's monster.
5	"Caveman Capers"	3 September 1960
Popeye remembers his prehistoric ancestor's discovery of spinach.
6	"Bullfighter Bully"	3 September 1960
7	"Ace of Space"	3 September 1960
8	"College of Hard Knocks"	4 September 1960
9	"Abdominal Snowman"	4 September 1960
10	"Ski-Jump Chump"	4 September 1960
11	"Irate Pirate"	5 September 1960
12	"Foola-Foola Bird"	5 September 1960
13	"Uranium on the Cranium"	5 September 1960
Popeye and Brutus race to an island containing uranium.
14	"Two-Faced Paleface"	8 September 1960
15	"Childhood Daze"	8 September 1960
Popeye has to protect Olive from Brutus, while he is changed into a baby.
16	"Sheepish Sheep-Herder"	8 September 1960
Popeye and Poopdeck Pappy clash with rustlers.
17	"Track Meet Cheat"	9 September 1960
18	"Crystal Ball Brawl"	9 September 1960
Brutus tries to steal a crystal ball in Popeye's possession.

=== Rembrandt Films/Halas and Batchelor ===
No.	Title	Original release date
1	"Interrupted Lullaby"	9 September 1960
Brutus learns from a newspaper headline that Swee'Pea has inherited 1 million dollars. Brutus devises a plot to kidnap the baby, but must get past Popeye, who has been left to babysit while Olive shops.
2	"Sea No Evil"	10 September 1960
Brutus is a marine shopkeeper who is practicing quite a scam. (Note: Jack Mercer performs Brutus here.)
3	"From Way Out"	10 September 1960
Popeye, Olive, and the Professor deal with a Martian delinquent.
4	"Seeing Double"	10 September 1960
Two plot elements: an expensive mink stole and a mechanical doppelganger of Popeye.
5	"Swee'pea Soup"	11 September 1960
King Blozo's subjects demand that he step down and install Swee'pea as King.
6	"Hag-Way Robbery"	11 September 1960
Sea Hag steals Popeye's cargo of spinach, putting the sailor in some of his worst distress since How Green Is My Spinach.
7	"The Lost City of Bubble-lon"	11 September 1960
Brutus raids an undersea kingdom.
8	"There's No Space Like Home"	12 September 1960
Brutus exploits a costume party in an attempt to win Olive.
9	"Potent Lotion"	12 September 1960
Popeye receives an "aftershave lotion" that induces aggression in anyone who smells him while Brutus and his cronies rob the bank.
10	"Astro-Nut"	12 September 1960
Popeye volunteers to be the test subject for the space capsule and must remain inside for the next 60 days.
11	"Goon with the Wind"	18 September 1960
Popeye and Olive enjoy a quiet stroll on the boat, arriving in Goon Island with the whole group of Goons.
12	"Insultin' the Sultan"	18 September 1960
Popeye and Olive get into a heated argument and break up. However, when a sultan wants Olive to be his bride, Popeye decides to go back to his old lover.
13	"Dog-Gone Dog-Catcher"	19 September 1960
When Olive's poodle named Zsa-Zsa gets snatched by Brutus, the unruly dog catcher, Popeye is determined to rescue Zsa-Zsa by disguising himself in a dog outfit.
14	"Voice from the Deep! or See Here Sea Hag!!"	19 September 1960
Popeye is called to Phony Island to help Chief Knucklebone and investigate the "talking volcano". He soon learns that Sea Hag is behind the strange voice.
15	"Matinée Idol Popeye"	19 September 1960
Director Brutus constantly finds roles for Popeye so deadly that they could kill him. (Note: the copyright line on the title card is incorrect as MCMXL (1940) instead of MCMLX (1960).)
16	"Beaver or Not"	22 September 1960
Two beavers build a dam that floods property owned by Popeye.
17	"The Billionaire"	17 September 1961
Take-off on the television series The Millionaire.
18	"Model Muddle"	18 September 1961
Olive decides that Popeye needs some type of art stuff, so she takes him to the American Museum of Art.
19	"Which Is Witch"	18 September 1961
The Sea Hag has a late plan. She makes a robot double of Olive to attack Popeye.
20	"Disguise the Limit"	18 September 1961
The master of disguises, Popeye and Brutus; Today's case is "The Gorilla Escapes from Zoo". It is a disguising case to solve.
21	"Spoil Sport"	19 September 1961
Olive wants to live the "sports car set" life and is baited by Brutus' expensive convertible.
22	"Have Time, Will Travel"	19 September 1961
A time machine takes Popeye and Olive back to the prehistoric era, where all kinds of madcap adventures take place.
23	"Intellectual Interlude"	19 May 1962
Olive Oyl tells Popeye that he needs to be more intellectual, so she enrolls herself and Popeye into adult education classes. While there, he samples a scientist's "Intellectual Spinach" potion which gives him genius-level intelligence.
24	"Partial Post"	22 January 1962
A spaceship lands on Earth carrying an alien disguised as a mailbox, just when Popeye wants to post a card to Olive.
25	"Weight for Me"	22 September 1961
Depressed over a lengthy tour by Popeye and Brutus, Olive eats herself into a grotesque shape.
26	"Canine Caprice"	22 March 1962
A talking dog (Jackson Beck) gets Popeye in repeated bits of trouble.
27	"Roger"	2 February 1963
Roger the talking dog wins himself back into Popeye and Olive's good graces in time to thwart a jewelry store heist.
28	"Tooth Be or Not Tooth Be"	23 April 1963
Swee'Pea undergoes an early rite of passage – his first tooth. Poopdeck Pappy tells Swee'Pea the story about how the Sea Hag tried to steal his perfect set of teeth.

=== Gerald Ray Studios ===
Note: In this production, the animation team was composed by: Izzy Ellis, Sam Kai, Casey Onaitis, Ray Young, Bill Higgins, Barney Posner, John Garling, and Bud Partch. Finally, backgrounds and layouts are made respectively by Dave Weidman and Henry Lee.

No.	Title	Directed by	Original release date
1	"Where There's a Will"	Bob Bemiller	September 15, 1960
Brutus and Popeye are co-beneficiaries in a will. At one point Brutus hurls a can of spinach at Popeye then says, "Oops, I shouldn't have done that!"
2	"Take It Easel"	Bob Bemiller	September 15, 1960
Popeye the artist literally paints his spinach to save the day.
3	"I Bin Sculped"	Bob Bemiller	September 15, 1960
Olive the artist is sculpting a statue personifying weakness and exhaustion.
4	"Fleas a Crowd"	Bob Bemiller	September 16, 1960
Brutus uses a robotic dog to steal Popeye's performing fleas.
5	"Popeye's Junior Headache"	Bob Bemiller	September 16, 1960
Popeye has more than he can take of Olive's mischievous niece named Deezil.
6	"Egypt Us"	Tom McDonald	September 16, 1960
In Egypt, Popeye, Olive and Wimpy are walking across the desert in swim gear carrying an umbrella, a ball and baskets of food. Olive is looking for a beach, assuming that they are in Atlantic City. Popeye is dubious, especially since they took such a long ferry ride to get there. Olive thinks the Sphinx is a fun house. Deciding to go no further, they start a fire to cook hamburgers while Olive seeks the ocean. Popeye is jumped by Egyptians and carried through a secret entrance in the Sphinx. He discovers that Olive has been made a desert goddess. Popeye tries to get Olive to leave, but she loves her new position. When she discovers what they have in mind, Popeye tries to save her from mummies, daddies and crocodiles. However, the real carnivore turns out to be Wimpy, who has eaten everything.
7	"The Big Sneeze"	Tom McDonald	September 17, 1960
Popeye, Olive and Swee'Pea are on a skiing vacation in the French Alps. Their guide is a St. Bernard dog. Olive refuses to ski because she is afraid of ruining her new raccoon coat, so the rest of the party leaves without her. Mysteriously, Olive's coat is stolen. She discovers a trail of footprints and sets off to find her coat. When Popeye, Swee'Pea, and the dog return, they start looking for Olive. They find her a captive of the abominable snowman, who suffers so much from colds every winter that he stole Olive's coat to get warm. He also captures Popeye and Swee'Pea, but the dog gets away and comes back with a can of spinach, which Olive eats. She beats the snowman, frees her friends and gets her coat back. However, she has a change of heart when the snowman starts sneezing and shivering and gives him her coat after all.
8	"The Last Resort"	Tom McDonald	September 17, 1960
Popeye, Olive and Wimpy check into a resort run by the Sea Hag and Toar. Wimpy makes "spinach burgers".
9	"Jeopardy Sheriff"	Tom McDonald	September 17, 1960
After Popeye reprimands Pappy for telling Swee'Pea tall tales of his days as a famous sheriff, the old man sets out to prove himself by stopping a bank robbery.
10	"Baby Phase"	Tom McDonald	September 18, 1960
After punishing Swee'Pea for juggling, Popeye dreams that the boy ran away to join the circus.

=== Jack Kinney Productions ===
No.	Title	Directed by	Written by	Background by	Layout by	Original release date
1	"Battery Up"	Volus Jones, Ed Friedman	Jack Kinney	Jules Engel, Rosemary O'Connor	Robert Givens	September 22, 1960
The big ball game between the Spinach Street AC (Popeye's the pitcher) vs. The Boilmaker Boys (Brutus and his gang) with Wimpy as umpire... Olive is rooting for Popeye. Popeye's zany pitching and Brutus' wild hits and misses turns the championship game into a disaster.
2	"Deserted Desert"	Eric Cleworth, Bill Keil	Jack Kinney	Jules Engel, Noel Tucker	Bruce Bushman	September 22, 1960
Popeye is in the desert looking for the lost Dutchman gold mine. He and Brutus find it at the same time and a fight for ownership ensues. Popeye wins only to face relatives and tax men stampeding for their share.
3	"Skinned Divers"	Rudy Larriva	Jack Kinney	Jules Engel, Boris Gorelick	Robert Givens	September 23, 1960
Popeye takes up the art of skin diving to hunt for buried treasure. He meets underwater creatures including mermaid Olive. He saves her from the clutches of another skindiver – Brutus.
4	"Popeye's Service Station"	Volus Jones, Ed Friedman	Jack Kinney	Jules Engel, Boris Gorelick	Noel Tucker	September 23, 1960
Popeye runs a gas station featuring free services. Customers want these free services, including Brutus, who sees Olive and tries to get a date with her. Popeye rescues Olive from Brutus.
5	"Coffee House"	Harvey Toombs	Jack Kinney	Jules Engel, Boris Gorelick	Robert Givens	September 23, 1960
Hip episode with a square Popeye who goes to the title location and tries to recapture Olive's affection from beatnik Brutus.
6	"Popeye's Pep-Up Emporium"	Volus Jones, Ed Friedman	Jack Kinney	Jules Engel, Boris Gorelick	Noel Tucker	September 24, 1960
Popeye is owner and instructor of a gym (a la Vic Tanny). The setup includes a TV commercial with Olive, Wimpy and later Brutus as clients.
7	"Bird Watcher Popeye"	Harvey Toombs	Ed Nofziger	Jules Engel, Boris Gorelick	Raymond Jacobs	September 24, 1960
Olive tries to improve Popeye's attitude by having him become a bird watcher.
8	"Time Marches Backwards"	Hugh Fraser	Ed Nofziger	Jules Engel, Boris Gorelick	Raymond Jacobs	September 24, 1960
Professor Wotasnozzle's time travel takes Popeye back to prehistoric times . . . Popeye rescues Olive from Caveman Brutus . . . Running gag finds Caveman Wimpy trying to catch a cow. As soon as Popeye rescues Olive, he is returned to the present.
9	"Popeye's Pet Store"	Rudy Larriva	Ed Nofziger	Jules Engel, Rosemary O'Connor	Noel Tucker	September 25, 1960
As a pet store owner, Popeye wants to have satisfied customers. (All other characters are his customers, except Brutus). Brutus snatches pets from customers and rejoices that they are now dissatisfied customers. Popeye dons a dog costume to investigate the trouble, outwits and outfights Brutus, and returns the pets to their rightful buyers.
10	"Ballet de Spinach"	Ken Hultgren	Ken Hultgren	Jules Engel, Boris Gorelick	Vern Jorgensen and Ken Hultgren	September 25, 1960
Brutus make fun of Popeye for donning a ballet costume and taking to the stage with Olive.
11	"Sea Hagracy"	Ken Hultgren	Ken Hultgren	Jules Engel, Boris Gorelick	Vern Jorgensen and Ken Hultgren	September 25, 1960
After the IRS man leaves her penniless, the Sea Hag decides to return to a life of piracy and make her enemy Popeye her partner. When Popeye refuses to join forces, she decides to take him out, even enlisting Wimpy to double-cross his buddy for the price of two hamburgers.
12	"Spinach Shortage"	Alan Zaslove	Jack Kinney	Jules Engel, Boris Gorelick	Bruce Bushman	September 26, 1960
Brutus corners the spinach market. Spinach prices soar and Popeye is unable to get spinach. He weakens progressively while searching for Brutus' spinach warehouse. He outwits Brutus, gets spinach and restores order to the market.
13	"Popeye and the Dragon"	Ken Hultgren	Raymond Jacobs	Jules Engel, Rosemary O'Connor	Robert Givens	September 26, 1960
Olive is carried off by a dragon in a Middle Ages-Time Machine gimmick . . . Sir Popeye buys a suit of armor and goes to her rescue. He wins a zany battle with a dragon. Do not confuse with "Popeye and the Polite Dragon" (#58, below).
14	"Popeye the Fireman"	Osmond Evans	Osmond Evans	Jules Engel, Rosemary O'Connor	Bruce Bushman	September 26, 1960
Brutus' very smoky cigar precipitates a series of gags involving firefighter's equipment as Popeye attempts to save Olive.
15	"Popeye's Pizza Palace"	Eddie Rehberg	Eddie Rehberg	Jules Engel, Rosemary O'Connor	Noel Tucker	September 29, 1960
After Wimpy wants pizza on credit. Brutus wants a pizza that Popeye does not make. He uses an assembly-line pizza making machine with resulting gags. There is a fight between Brutus and Popeye over pizza. Brutus is made into Pizza Bread Man. Wimpy ends up paying cash for his pizza.
16	"Down the Hatch"	Alan Zaslove	Jack Kinney	Rosemary O'Connor, Boris Gorelick	Robert Givens	September 29, 1960
A sea-faring tale involving Popeye, Brutus and Wimpy.
17	"Lighthouse Keeping"	Eddie Rehberg	Eddie Rehberg	Jules Engel, Boris Gorelick	Eddie Rehberg	September 29, 1960
Popeye is in charge of a lighthouse and must defeat a hungry shark.
18	"Popeye and the Phantom"	Ken Hultgren	Ed Nofziger	Jules Engel, Rosemary O'Connor	Vern Jorgensen and Ken Hultgren	September 1960
Ghosts outwit Popeye but there's a plot twist.
19	"Popeye's Picnic"	Osmond Evans	Osmond Evans	Jules Engel, Rosemary O'Connor	Bruce Bushman	September 1960
A picnic outing becomes an unpleasant encounter with a bull.
20	"Out of This World"	Volus Jones, Ed Friedman	Ed Nofziger	Jules Engel, Rosemary O'Connor	Robert Givens	September 1960
21	"Madam Salami"	Harvey Toombs	Tony Benedict	Jules Engel, Rosemary O'Connor	Raymond Jacobs	September 1960
Brutus disguises himself as the title character, a fortune teller.
22	"Timber Toppers"	Osmond Evans	Noel Tucker	Jules Engel, Rosemary O'Connor	Noel Tucker	September 1960
Lumberjack Popeye takes Olive to the forest to show her what a great tree cutter he is. Brutus hijacks Popeye's trees, and Olive too. A fight ensues. Popeye finds himself tied to a log headed for the saw mill with Olive but manages to consume his spinach.
23	"Skyscraper Capers"	Rudy Larriva	Nick George	Jules Engel, Rosemary O'Connor	Robert Givens	October 1960
24	"Private Eye Popeye"	Rudy Larriva	Raymond Jacobs	Jules Engel, Rosemary O'Connor	Jerry Nevius	October 2, 1960
Note: This episode is also the name of a 1954 Popeye theatrical cartoon.
25	"Little Olive Riding Hood"	Harvey Toombs	Ed Nofziger	Jules Engel, Connie Matthews	Robert Givens	October 2, 1960
Note: A parody of Little Red Riding Hood.
26	"Popeye's Hypnotic Glance"	Volus Jones, Ed Friedman	Ed Nofziger	Jules Engel, Rosemary O'Connor	Noel Tucker	October 2, 1960
Brutus hypnotizes Olive into falling in love with him. Then he hypnotizes Alice the Goon into falling in love with Popeye.
27	"Popeye's Trojan Horse"	Ken Hultgren	Ed Nofziger	Jules Engel, Boris Gorelick	Ken Hultgren	October 3, 1960
Popeye reads the Trojan Horse legend to Swee'Pea .
28	"Frozen Feuds"	Eddie Rehberg	Eddie Rehberg	Jules Engel, Rosemary O'Connor	Eddie Rehberg	October 3, 1960
A small town in the new State of Alaska is being menaced by "Alice the Goon" -- who puts such fear into people that they turn white. Popeye tries to catch Alice and does so by promising her a movie contract. In exchange for this, Alice gives Popeye her hat for Olive Oyl.
29	"Popeye's Corn-Certo"	Eddie Rehberg	Joe Siracusa, Cliff Millsap	Jules Engel, Rosemary O'Connor	Raymond Jacobs	October 3, 1960
30	"Westward Ho-Ho"	Volus Jones, Ed Friedman	Ed Nofziger	Jules Engel, Boris Gorelick	Raymond Jacobs	October 6, 1960
A family album tale told to Swee'Pea by Popeye about Great-Grandpappy Poopdeck Popeye who signed up to captain a "prairie schooner," only to discover it was a wagon train.
31	"Popeye's Cool Pool"	Rudy Larriva	Ed Nofziger	Jules Engel, Rosemary O'Connor	Jerry Nevius	October 6, 1960
Popeye gets an idea to build a "do-it-yourself' swimming pool. He borrows his tools back from his next-door neighbor, Brutus, and starts in. Brutus sneakily changes the property line fence, and Popeye unknowingly builds most of the pool in Brutus' yard. Olive and Wimpy keep dropping in to check the pool progress. When the pool is finally completed, Brutus discloses the pool is in his yard, and after a fight between Popeye and Brutus, Brutus is forced to dig a hole in Popeye's backyard and put the pool back.
32	"Jeep Jeep"	Ken Hultgren	Ed Nofziger	Jules Engel, Rosemary O'Connor	Ken Hultgren	October 6, 1960
Swee'Pea befriends a mystical creature called Jeep who can answer any question. Popeye's arch enemies -- Brutus and Sea Hag -- steal the Jeep and let him disclose the gold site. However, Jeep tricks them by drawing a map which causes Brutus and the Hag to dig right into jail.
33	"Popeye's Museum Piece"	Eddie Rehberg	Carol Beers, Ruben Apodaca	Jules Engel, Rosemary O'Connor	Raymond Jacobs	October 7, 1960
Popeye, custodian of a museum, must deal with artifact damage and art theft.
34	"Golf Brawl"	Volus Jones, Ed Friedman	Jack Kinney	Jules Engel	Robert Givens	October 7, 1960
Popeye, Brutus, Olive and Wimpy find themselves in a comedy-of-errors golf tournament.
35	"Wimpy's Lunch Wagon"	Volus Jones	W. Schmidt	Boris Gorelick	Raymond Jacobs	October 7, 1960
Wimpy as restaurateur has help from Popeye and Olive.
36	"Weather Watchers"	Volus Jones, Ed Friedman	Raymond Jacobs	Jules Engel, Connie Matthews	Noel Tucker	October 8, 1960
Brutus and Popeye are rival weather forecasters and Olive runs their station.
37	"Popeye and the Magic Hat"	Ken Hultgren	Osmond Evans	Jules Engel, Rosemary O'Connor	Ken Hultgren	October 8, 1960
During his magic show, Brutus asks Popeye on-stage and proceeds to make him look foolish.
38	"Popeye and the Giant"	Hugh Fraser	Noel Tucker	Jules Engel, Boris Gorelick	Noel Tucker	October 8, 1960
Brutus feeds Wimpy growth pills, causing him to grow to freakish proportions.
39	"Hill-Billy-Dilly"	Harvey Toombs	Wesley Bennett	Jules Engel, Rosemary O'Connor	Jerry Nevius	September 24, 1960
Popeye and Olive blunder into a hillbilly feud.
40	"Pest of the Pecos"	Harvey Toombs	Raymond Jacobs	Raymond Jacobs, Vern Jorgensen	Raymond Jacobs	October 8, 1960
Popeye, sheriff of the Old West town Gravestone Flats, has all he can handle after Brutus arrives.
41	"The Blubbering Whaler"	Ken Hultgren	Raymond Jacobs	Jules Engel, Rosemary O'Connor	Noel Tucker	October 9, 1960
42	"Popeye and the Spinach Stalk"	Ken Hultgren	Jack Miller	Jules Engel, Connie Matthews	Ken Hultgren	October 9, 1960
A parody of Jack and the Beanstalk.
43	"Shoot the Chutes"	Volus Jones, Ed Friedman	Ed Nofziger	Jules Engel, Rosemary O'Connor	Jerry Nevius	October 9, 1960
44	"Tiger Burger"	Harvey Toombs	Cal Howard	Rosemary O'Connor	Jerry Nevius	October 10, 1960
45	"Bottom Gun"	Rudy Larriva	Raymond Jacobs	Jules Engel, Boris Gorelick	Raymond Jacobs	October 10, 1960
46	"Olive Drab and the Seven Sweapeas"	Volus Jones, Ed Friedman	Jack Miller	Jules Engel, Boris Gorelick	Noel Tucker	October 10, 1960
A parody of Snow White and the Seven Dwarfs with Sea Hag as villain.
47	"Blinkin' Beacon"	Eddie Rehberg	Eddie Rehberg	Jules Engel, Rosemary O'Connor	Raymond Jacobs	October 13, 1960
Stormy weather and an extremely mischievous Sea Hag make a troublesome night at Popeye's lighthouse.
48	"Aztec Wreck"	Hugh Fraser	Warren Bennett	Jules Engel, Boris Gorelick	Raymond Jacobs	October 13, 1960
Popeye and Olive are treasure-questing tourists in Mexico and Brutus is a native guide who shows his unscrupulous side.
49	"The Green Dancin' Shoes"	Ken Hultgren	Ed Nofziger	Jules Engel, Boris Gorelick	Jerry Nevius	March 13, 1963
Magic shoes send Olive out of control.
50	"Spare Dat Tree"	Ken Hultgren	Ed Nofziger	Jules Engel, Rosemary O'Connor	Ken Hultgren	October 14, 1960
Popeye is a Park ranger who must protect landmark trees from Brutus and his cutting tools.
51	"The Glad Gladiator"	Eddie Rehberg	Cal Howard	Jules Engel, Boris Gorelick	Raymond Jacobs	October 14, 1960
Popeye is transported by a time machine to the center of the Coliseum in Rome, 65 A.D. Brutus Nero, emperor, is annoyed by his girlfriend's (Olive) interest in Popeye. He makes Popeye battle gladiators, lions, and elephants. Popeye gets mad, beats up Nero and becomes the new emperor. Nero avenges by burning Rome. Popeye returns to the present, and Brutus rises with his hat charred.
52	"The Golden Touch"	Eddie Rehberg	Ed Nofziger	Jules Engel, Boris Gorelick	Jerry Nevius	October 24, 1960
53	"Hamburger Fishing"	Harvey Toombs	Ed Nofziger	Boris Gorelick	Raymond Jacobs	September 5, 1961
Popeye tells Swee'Pea about a hungry fisherman (Wimpy) who is casting for hamburgers in a forest with a lasso.
54	"Popeye the Popular Mechanic"	Hugh Fraser	Joe Grant, Walter Schmidt	Jules Engel, Rosemary O'Connor	Jerry Nevius	October 15, 1960
Popeye buys a do-it-yourself kit and makes a mechanical servant who shows him undesirable aspects of automation.
55	"Popeye's Folly"	Volus Jones, Ed Friedman	Raymond Jacobs	Jules Engel, Boris Gorelick	Raymond Jacobs	October 15, 1960
Popeye, while bathing Swee'Pea, tells his story of building the first steamboat and facing a rival (Brutus).
56	"Popeye's Used Car"	Hugh Fraser	Milt Schaffer	Jules Engel, Boris Gorelick	Jerry Nevius	October 16, 1960
Automotive gadgetry drives the humor in this episode.
57	"Spinachonara"	Harvey Toombs	Jack Kinney	Ervin L. Kaplan	Jerry Nevius	October 16, 1960
Popeye reads Swee'Pea a Japanese true-fairy story which is oriented around Far East designs and cuisine.
58	"Popeye and the Polite Dragon"	Rudy Larriva	Joe Grant, Walter Schmidt	Jules Engel, Rosemary O'Connor	Jerry Nevius	October 16, 1960
A dragon magically pops out of a storybook that Popeye is reading to Swee'pea.
59	"Popeye the Ugly Ducklin'"	Volus Jones, Ed Friedman	Ed Nofziger	Jules Engel, Boris Gorelick	Noel Tucker	October 17, 1960
A parody of The Ugly Duckling.
60	"Popeye's Tea Party"	Hugh Fraser	Jim Rivind	Boris Gorelick	Raymond Jacobs	October 17, 1960
Popeye is sent back in time to the time of The Boston Tea Party. The local residents are fed up with being overtaxed, so they plot to throw the tea overboard into the sea.
61	"The Troll Wot Got Gruff"	Volus Jones, Ed Friedman	Ed Nofziger	Jules Engel, Boris Gorelick	Noel Tucker	October 17, 1960
Note: A parody of The Three Billy Goats Gruff.
62	"Popeye the Lifeguard"	Harvey Toombs	Milt Schaffer	Boris Gorelick	Raymond Jacobs	October 20, 1960
Popeye become jealous of a lifeguard.
63	"Popeye in the Woods"	Eddie Rehberg	Ed Nofziger	Jules Engel, Rosemary O'Connor	Raymond Jacobs	October 20, 1960
A Smokey Bear influence is evident as Wimpy, eager to cook, is ignorant of outdoor fire hazards.
64	"After the Ball Went Over"	Eddie Rehberg	Eddie Rehberg	Rosemary O'Connor	Raymond Jacobs	October 20, 1960
Brutus plans challenges Popeye to a game of ping-pong and the winner is to receive a kiss from Olive Oyl. However, Popeye has problems beating Brutus without the aid of his spinach.
65	"Popeye and Buddy Brutus"	Rudy Larriva	Jack Kinney	Jules Engel, Rosemary O'Connor	Jerry Nevius	October 20, 1960
Popeye, Brutus and Wimpy at sea.
66	"Popeye's Car Wash"	Harvey Toombs	Harvey Toombs	Jules Engel, Rosemary O'Connor	Raymond Jacobs	October 21, 1960
Popeye opens a car wash. Brutus has a car wash across the street.
67	"Camel Aires"	Hugh Fraser	Carol Beers	Jules Engel, Rosemary O'Connor	Raymond Jacobs	October 21, 1960
68	"Plumbers Pipe Dream"	Hal Ambro	Raymond Jacobs	Jules Engel, Boris Gorelick	Raymond Jacobs	October 21, 1960
Popeye's attempts to fix Olive's faucet lead to an escalating series of disasters that culminate in flooding all of New York City.
69	"Popeye and the Herring Snatcher"	Eddie Rehberg	Joe Grant, Walter Schmidt	Jules Engel, Boris Gorelick	Raymond Jacobs	October 22, 1960
Popeye runs afoul of a fish thief.
70	"Invisible Popeye"	Hugh Fraser	Dennis Fraser	Ervin L. Kaplan	Raymond Jacobs	October 22, 1960
Futuristic beings remotely activate Prof. Watasnozzel's time machine and abduct Olive. When even spinach power isn't enough to crack their defenses, Popeye uses the Professor's invisibility pills to sneak in.
71	"The Square Egg"	Rudy Larriva	Rosemary O'Connor	Rosemary O'Connor	Noel Tucker	October 22, 1960
Swee'Pea has a square egg; did he find it or did he lay it? Whichever way he got it (Probably from Popeye's chicken ranch), it is very rare and valuable.
72	"Old Salt Tale"	Hugh Fraser	Ed Nofziger	Ervin L. Kaplan	Noel Tucker	October 23, 1960
Popeye fancifully explains to Swee'pea the reason why the ocean is salty . . . only to find that Swee'pea knows the real reason behind "sodium chloride in solution."
73	"Jeep Tale"	Rudy Larriva	Ed Nofziger	Jules Engel, Rosemary O'Connor	Raymond Jacobs	October 23, 1960
Note: A parody of The Tale of Peter Rabbit.
74	"The Super Duper Market"	Ed Friedman	Tom Hix	Ervin L. Kaplan	Jerry Nevius	October 23, 1960
Popeye, Olive Oyl and Wimpy shop at Brutus' vast supermarket, where one man claims to have been lost for 15 years.
75	"Golden-Type Fleece"	Ken Hultgren	Ed Nofziger	Boris Gorelick	Noel Tucker	October 14, 1960
Popeye goes back in time to ancient Greece and captures the Golden Fleece.
76	"Popeye the White Collar Man"	Rudy Larriva	Joe Grant, Walter Schmidt	Ervin L. Kaplan	Raymond Jacobs	October 24, 1960
Olive convinces Popeye to become a white collar worker.
77	"Swea pea Thru the Looking Glass"	Volus Jones	Ed Nofziger	Ervin L. Kaplan	Raymond Jacobs	October 27, 1960
A parody of Through the Looking-Glass.
78	"The Black Knight"	Ken Hultgren	Ed Nofziger	Jules Engel, Vern Jorgensen	Ken Hultgren	October 27, 1960
A visually striking title card precedes Popeye's journey back in time to King Arthur's Camelot.
79	"Jingle Jangle Jungle"	Ken Hultgren	Ed Nofziger	Jules Engel, Rosemary O'Connor	Ken Hultgren	October 27, 1960
80	"The Day Silky Went Blozo"	Hugh Fraser	Joseph Stewart, Jack Kinney	Peggy Morrow	Ray Jacobs	October 28, 1960
81	"Rip Van Popeye"	Ken Hultgren	Joe Grant, Walter Schmidt	Ervin L. Kaplan	Jerry Nevius and Raymond Jacobs	October 28, 1960
82	"Mississippi Sissy"	Hugh Fraser	Jack Kinney, Ed Nofziger	Ervin L. Kaplan	Raymond Jacobs	October 28, 1960
Popeye, Olive, Wimpy and Brutus participate in a riverboat mystery.
83	"Double Cross Country Feet Race"	Hugh Fraser	Ralph Wright	Ervin L. Kaplan	Raymond Jacobs	October 29, 1960
Popeye and Brutus compete in a foot race for a date with Olive.
84	"Fashion Photography"	Phil Duncan	Ed Nofziger	Ervin L. Kaplan	Raymond Jacobs	October 29, 1960
Olive wants to be a fashion model.
85	"I Yam Wot I Yamnesia"	Ken Hultgren	Ralph Wright	Boris Gorelick	Jerry Nevius	October 29, 1960
Popeye and Swee'pea, and Olive and Wimpy switch personalities as a result of amnesia.
86	"Paper Pasting Pandemonium"	Rudy Larriva	Ed Nofziger	Ervin L. Kaplan	Raymond Jacobs	October 30, 1960
Popeye and Brutus are given one hour to wallpaper Olive's house before her company arrives.
87	"Coach Popeye"	Volus Jones	Jack Kinney	Bob McIntosh	Raymond Jacobs	October 30, 1960
88	"Popeyed Columbus"	Hugh Fraser	Raymond Jacobs	Jules Engel, Rosemary O'Connor	Raymond Jacobs	October 30, 1960
89	"Popeye Revere"	Ken Hultgren	Noel Tucker	Ervin L. Kaplan	Raymond Jacobs	October 1960
90	"Popeye in Haweye"	Hugh Fraser	Raymond Jacobs	Peggy Morrow	Ray Jacobs	October 1960
With Olive is a tourist in Hawaii and Popeye and Brutus are tour guides. They fight over who will be the one to show Olive the islands. Olive decides to take two tours, but only pays the guide who gives the best tour.
91	"Forever Ambergris"	Eddie Rehberg	Ralph Wright	Ervin L. Kaplan	Jerry Nevius	October 1960
92	"Popeye de Leon"	Eddie Rehberg	Ralph Wright	Boris Gorelick	Jerry Nevius	November 3, 1960
As Juan Ponce de León, Popeye fends off a "crocagator" and guards the Fountain of Youth.
93	"Popeyed Fisherman"	Murray McClellan	Jack Kinney	Bob McIntosh	Jerry Nevius	November 3, 1960
94	"Popeye in the Grand Steeplechase"	Harvey Toombs	Carol Beers	Ervin L. Kaplan	Raymond Jacobs	November 3, 1960
Popeye and Brutus compete in a horse race.
95	"Uncivil War"	Volus Jones	Jerry Nevius	Ervin L. Kaplan	Raymond Jacobs	November 4, 1960
96	"Popeye the Piano Mover"	Harvey Toombs	Harvey Toombs	Ervin L. Kaplan	Jerry Nevius	November 4, 1960
97	"Popeye's Testimonial Dinner"	Volus Jones	Jerry Nevius	Ervin L. Kaplan	Raymond Jacobs	November 4, 1960
98	"Around the World in Eighty Ways"	Harvey Toombs	Ralph Wright	Peggy Morrow	Raymond Jacobs	November 5, 1960
99	"Popeye's Fixit Shop"	Hugh Fraser	Ralph Wright	Peggy Morrow	Raymond Jacobs	November 5, 1960
100	"Bell Hop Popeye"	Harvey Toombs	Cal Howard	Peggy Morrow	Raymond Jacobs	November 5, 1960
Popeye and Brutus work as bellhops and rival hosts of Olive.
101	"Barbecue for Two"	Harvey Toombs, Eric Cleworth, Abe Levitow, Volus Jones, Bill Keil	Dick Kinney, Al Bertino	TBA	Bruce Bushman	June 10, 1960
Popeye clashes with uninvited Brutus, Wimpy and Swee'pea over a barbecue. Note: The five men in the Animation Direction By column are credited as Animators. This episode uses the Famous Studios opening music.

=== Paramount Cartoon Studios ===
No.	Title	Written by	Animated by	Scenics by	Original release date
1	"Hits and Missiles"	Unknown	TBA	TBA	September 1, 1960
Popeye must rescue the cheese denizens of the Moon. Note: This episode uses the Famous Studios opening music.
2	"Seer-ring Is Believer-ring"	I. Klein	I. Klein, Jack Ehret, and Dick Hall	Anton Loeb	September 16, 1960
Olive purchases a ring that belongs to a mystic.
3	"The Ghost Host"	Seymour Kneitel	Morey Reden, Jack Ehret, and I. Klein	Anton Loeb	November 6, 1960
4	"Strikes, Spares an' Spinach"	Seymour Kneitel	Wm. B. Pattengill and I. Klein	Anton Loeb	November 6, 1960
Popeye tries to teach Olive bowling, but Brutus keeps messing them up.
5	"Jeep Is Jeep"	I. Klein	Morey Reden, I. Klein, and Wm. B. Pattengill	Anton Loeb	November 6, 1960
6	"The Spinach Scholar"	Seymour Kneitel	Morey Reden, Irving Dressler, and Jack Ehret	Anton Loeb	November 7, 1960
Olive insists that the illiterate, uneducated Popeye enroll in grammar school.
7	"Psychiatricks"	Seymour Kneitel	Morey Reden, Irving Dressler, and Wm. B. Pattengill	Anton Loeb	November 7, 1960
Brutus tricks Popeye into a psychology session.
8	"Rags to Riches to Rags"	Seymour Kneitel	Morey Reden, Jack Ehret, I. Klein, and Wm. B. Pattengill	Anton Loeb	November 7, 1960
Wimpy inherits a fortune and tries to double it by betting that Popeye will lose an upcoming fight.
9	"Hair Cut-Ups"	Seymour Kneitel	Morey Reden, Irving Dressler, and Wm. B. Pattengill	Anton Loeb	October 15, 1960
10	"Poppa Popeye"	Seymour Kneitel	Nick Tafuri, Jack Ehret, and I. Klein	Anton Loeb	November 10, 1960
After losing Swee'pea to a circus performer, who passes himself off as Swee'pea's long-lost dad, Popeye goes through so much depression that he starts to act like a baby.
11	"Quick Change Ollie"	I. Klein	Martin Taras, Gerry Dvorak, Jack Ehret, and Dick Hall	Anton Loeb	November 10, 1960
Popeye and Wimpy go back in time to the "ollie days", thanks to the Whiffle Bird.
12	"Valley of the Goons"	Seymour Kneitel	Martin Taras, Gerry Dvorak, Al Pross, and Sam Stimson	Anton Loeb	November 11, 1960
Popeye must help the Goons when their island is attacked by pirates.
13	"Me Quest for Poopdeck Pappy"	Seymour Kneitel	Nick Tafuri, Wm. B. Pattengill, Jack Ehret, and Sam Stimson	Anton Loeb	November 11, 1960
Popeye seeks out his long-lost father.
14	"Moby Hick"	I. Klein	Morey Reden, Irving Dressler, I. Klein, and Wm. B. Pattengill	Anton Loeb	November 11, 1960
The Sea Hag tricks Popeye into attacking a benevolent whale.
15	"Mirror Magic"	Seymour Kneitel	Martin Taras, Dante Barbetta, Dick Hall, William Henning, and Al Pross	Anton Loeb	November 12, 1960
A fairy-tale kingdom is ruled by the land's strongest man, ruthless King Brutus, but his magic mirror informs him of a potential challenger in Popeye.
16	"It Only Hurts When They Laughs"	Seymour Kneitel	Morey Reden, Irving Dressler, and I. Klein	Anton Loeb	November 12, 1960
Olive forces Popeye and Brutus to laugh their way to friendship.
17	"Wimpy the Moocher"	Seymour Kneitel	Morey Reden, I. Klein, and Wm. B. Pattengill	Anton Loeb	November 12, 1960
Wimpy pulls off an audacious con on short-order cook Rough House.
18	"Voo-Doo to You Too"	Seymour Kneitel	Martin Taras, Gerry Dvorak, Dick Hall, and I. Klein	Anton Loeb	November 13, 1960
The Sea Hag turns Olive into a zombie and freezes Popeye with a voodoo doll.
19	"Popeye Goes Sale-ing"	Seymour Kneitel	Nick Tafuri, Irving Dressler, Dick Hall, and Wm. B. Pattengill	Anton Loeb	November 13, 1960
Olive drags Popeye into a nasty department store sale.
20	"Popeye's Travels"	Seymour Kneitel	Nick Tafuri, Irving Dressler, Jack Ehret, and I. Klein	Anton Loeb	November 13, 1960
Note: A parody of Gulliver's Travels.
21	"Incident at Missile City"	Howard A. Schneider	Morey Reden, Irving Dressler, and I. Klein	Anton Loeb	November 14, 1960
King Blozo's kingdom comes under attack from a city of missiles.
22	"Dog Catcher Popeye"	Carl Meyer and Jack Mercer	Martin Taras, Irving Dressler, Gerry Dvorak, and Jack Ehret	Anton Loeb	November 14, 1960
23	"What's News"	Seymour Kneitel	Nick Tafuri, Irving Dressler, I. Klein, and Sam Stimson	Robert Owen	November 14, 1960
Popeye and Olive open a newspaper in a small desert town.
24	"Spinach Greetings"	Seymour Kneitel	Morey Reden, Irving Dressler, Jack Ehret, and Al Pross	Anton Loeb	November 15, 1960
The Sea Hag, and her vulture Bernard, interrupt Popeye's family Christmas and kidnap Santa Claus. It's up to Popeye to rescue Santa and save Christmas. Notes: This was the final Christmas short film starring Popeye The Sailor and produced by Paramount Pictures. The next such film was Popeye's Voyage: The Quest for Pappy in 2004.
25	"Oil's Well That Ends Well"	Carl Meyer and Jack Mercer	Martin Taras, Irving Dressler, Jack Ehret, and Jim Logan	Anton Loeb	January 4, 1961
Brutus cons Olive into purchasing a seemingly dry oil well.
26	"Motor Knocks"	Al Pross	Nick Tafuri, Irving Dressler, William Henning, and I. Klein	Anton Loeb	January 10, 1961
Brutus keeps flirting with Olive, while "fixing" Popeye's car.
27	"Amusement Park"	Howard A. Schneider	Morey Reden, Jack Ehret, and William Henning	Anton Loeb	January 7, 1961
Freak show operator Brutus abducts Swee'pea.
28	"Duel to the Finish"	Seymour Kneitel	Wm. B. Pattengill, Dante Barbetta, William Henning, and Al Pross	Anton Loeb	January 12, 1961
Popeye gets extremely jealous when Wimpy starts sweet-talking Olive.
29	"Gem Jam"	I. Klein	Wm. B. Pattengill, Irving Dressler, and I. Klein	Anton Loeb	January 14, 1961
The Sea Hag gives Olive a cursed perfume which turns her into a gem thief.
30	"The Bathing Beasts"	Irving Dressler	Martin Taras, Dick Hall, and Jim Logan	Robert Owen	January 29, 1961
Olive tricks Brutus and Popeye into a bathing contest.
31	"Messin' Up the Mississippi"	Carl Meyer and Jack Mercer	Morey Reden, Gerry Dvorak, and I. Klein	Anton Loeb	March 23, 1961
32	"Love Birds"	Carl Meyer and Jack Mercer	Wm. B. Pattengill, Dick Hall, and Al Pross	Anton Loeb	March 31, 1961
Popeye buys a male bluebird named Romeo for Olive's pet bluebird Juliet. After the birds have a heated argument, Romeo flies away, and Popeye must find him before Olive makes him fly away.
33	"Sea Serpent"	Carl Meyer and Jack Mercer	Morey Reden, Dick Hall, I. Klein, and Sam Stimson	Anton Loeb	April 3, 1961
34	"Boardering on Trouble"	Carl Meyer and Jack Mercer	Wm. B. Pattengill, Gerry Dvorak, Dick Hall, and Jim Logan	Anton Loeb	April 14, 1961
35	"Aladdin's Lamp"	Carl Meyer and Jack Mercer	Martin Taras, Gerry Dvorak, Jim Logan, and Larry Silverman	Anton Loeb	April 29, 1961
The Sea Hag acquires a magic lamp.
36	"Butler Up"	I. Klein	Morey Reden, Gerry Dvorak, William Henning, and I. Klein	Anton Loeb	May 2, 1961
Olive's old friend Brutus comes over for a reunion dinner, and she wants Popeye to be their butler.
37	"The Leprechaun"	Carl Meyer and Jack Mercer	Morey Reden, William Henning, Al Pross, and Larry Silverman	Anton Loeb	May 5, 1961
The Sea Hag steals Irish gold from a leprechaun.
38	"County Fair"	Carl Meyer and Jack Mercer	Martin Taras, Dante Barbetta, Dick Hall, and Jim Logan	Robert Little	May 5, 1961
39	"Hamburgers Aweigh"	Joseph Gottlieb	Martin Taras, Jim Logan, and Larry Silverman	Anton Loeb	May 10, 1961
The Sea Hag hypnotises Wimpy into hijacking Popeye's ship.
40	"Popeye's Double Trouble"	Joseph Gottlieb	Wm. B. Pattengill, George Germanetti, Larry Silverman, and Sam Stimson	Anton Loeb	May 28, 1961
Popeye gets the Sea Hag's good luck coin and uses its power of granting three wishes to whoever holds it to take Olive out to a dancing competition. The Sea Hag takes Olive hostage and magically disguises herself as her so that she can go with Popeye to the dance and get the coin back before he uses up the three wishes.
41	"Kiddie Kapers"	Joseph Gottlieb	Morey Reden, Dick Hall, I. Klein, and Larry Silverman	Anton Loeb	June 3, 1961
A potion created by the Sea Hag turns Brutus into an attractive young man, and he uses it to impress and woo Olive. After Popeye sees through Brutus' attractiveness, he uses the same potion, but it turns him into a baby.
42	"The Mark of Zero"	Irving Dressler	Wm. B. Pattengill, Dick Hall, and Sam Stinson	Anton Loeb	June 3, 1961
Popeye tells Olive's niece Diesel Oyl a story about a swashbuckling swordsman.
43	"Myskery Melody"	Seymour Kneitel	Martin Taras, Gerry Dvorak, George Germanetti, and Jim Logan	Robert Owen	June 3, 1961
Poopdeck Pappy is hypnotized by a haunting flute melody.
44	"Scairdy Cat"	Joseph Gottlieb	Irving Dressler, Dante Barbetta, and Dick Hall	Robert Owen	June 4, 1961
Brutus creates a perfume that turns Popeye into a frightened, defenseless weakling.
45	"Operation Ice-Tickle"	Joseph Gottlieb	Martin Taras, Gerry Dvorak, and Jim Logan	Robert Owen	June 5, 1961
After yet another argument between Popeye and Brutus, Olive decides to hold a contest; the first one who brings her the North Pole will go out with her.
46	"The Cure"	Carl Meyer and Jack Mercer	Martin Taras, George Germanetti, and Larry Silverman	Robert Owen	June 6, 1961
47	"William Won't Tell"	Carl Meyer and Jack Mercer	I. Klein, George Germanetti, William Henning, and Sam Stimson	Anton Loeb	June 10, 1961
A parody of William Tell.
48	"Pop Goes the Whistle"	Carl Meyer and Jack Mercer	Irving Dressler, Gerry Dvorak, Jack Ehret, and George Germanetti	Anton Loeb	July 10, 1961
49	"Autographically Yours"	Carl Meyer and Jack Mercer	Morey Reden, Jack Ehret, George Germanetti, and Sam Stimson	Anton Loeb	July 11, 1961
Popeye and Brutus compete for the affection of a young movie fan in a remake of Shootin' Stars.
50	"A Poil for Olive Oyl"	Joseph Gottlieb	Wm. B. Pattengill, Dante Barbetta, Irving Dressler, and William Henning	Anton Loeb	September 11, 1961
Popeye wants to give Olive a stylish necklace, but the one she wants from a jewelry store costs too much. Popeye decides to make her one by diving into the sea to use the pearls from clams. However, the pearls belong to the Sea Hag, and she tries to stop him.
51	"My Fair Olive"	Joseph Gottlieb	Martin Taras, Gerry Dvorak, John Gentilella, and George Germanetti	Anton Loeb	September 11, 1961
Popeye and Brutus compete in a medieval joust to win Olive's affection.
52	"Giddy Gold"	I. Klein	I. Klein, John Gentilella, and George Germanetti	Robert Owen	September 12, 1961
The Wiffle Bird turns the Tunnel of Love into a gold mine, and Olive decides to loot them all, but she and Popeye must pass through three dangerous situations, if they are to leave with their treasure.
53	"Strange Things Are Happening"	Carl Meyer and Jack Mercer	Irving Dressler, William Henning, and Sam Stimson	Anton Loeb	September 12, 1961
54	"The Medicine Man"	Carl Meyer and Jack Mercer	Morey Reden, Dante Barbetta, John Gentilella, and Dick Hall	Anton Loeb	September 12, 1961
Popeye has a thriving medicine show business where he sells bottles of spinach juice -- which is guaranteed to bring back a person's vim, vigor, and vitality and prevent sunburn, windburn, and moonburn! However, Brutus is jealous of Popeye's success and tries to prove the elixir is no good.
55	"The Rain Breaker"	I. Klein	Nick Tafuri, Irving Dressler, William Henning, and Sam Stimson	Anton Loeb	February 3, 1961
56	"A Mite of Trouble"	Carl Meyer and Jack Mercer	Martin Taras, Gerry Dvorak, George Germanetti, and Jim Logan	Anton Loeb	September 15, 1961
57	"Who's Kiddin' Zoo"	Carl Meyer and Jack Mercer	Morey Reden, Irving, Dressler, George Germanetti, and I. Klein	Anton Loeb	September 15, 1961
Olive makes Popeye her assistant at a zoo, and Brutus tries to mess up Popeye's work.
58	"Robot Popeye"	Seymour Kneitel	Wm. B. Pattengill, Gerry Dvorak, Jim Logan, and Al Pross	Anton Loeb	September 15, 1961
Brutus builds a robot double of Popeye in order to ruin his relationship with Olive.
59	"Sneaking Peeking"	I. Klein	Wm. B. Pattengill, Dick Hall, William Henning, and Jim Logan	Anton Loeb	September 16, 1961
To stop Swee'Pea from peeking at birthday presents, Olive tells him of a princess whose own habit unleashes a malicious genie.
60	"The Wiffle Bird's Revenge"	I. Klein	Wm. B. Pattengill, Dick Hall, Al Pross, and Larry Silverman	Anton Loeb	September 16, 1961
The Whiffle Bird turns Wimpy into a vicious werewolf.
61	"Going...Going...Gone"	Joseph Gottlieb	Morey Reden, George Germanetti, I. Klein, and Wm. B. Pattengill	Anton Loeb	September 17, 1961
Wimpy uses vanishing cream to escape Brutus.
62	"Popeye Thumb"	Seymour Kneitel	Martin Taras, Irving Dressler, I. Klein, and Jim Logan	Anton Loeb	September 17, 1961
Note: A parody of Tom Thumb.
63	"The Baby Contest"	Carl Meyer and Jack Mercer	Morey Reden, Irving Dressler, Jack Ehret, I. Klein, and Al Pross	Anton Loeb	December 11, 1961

== Home video ==
=== VHS ===
In the late 1990s, the Popeyes Chicken & Biscuits restaurant franchise released most of the 1960s cartoons on VHS in the Popeye Cartoon Video Collection Series promotional line. Each video in the series featured one promotional segment for Popeyes showing video footage of its products followed by the 1960s Popeye cartoons. After the cartoons, a second segment for the restaurant and two bonus cartoons were also featured.

=== DVD ===
In 2004, Family Home Entertainment released four of the 1960s cartoons on the DVD release of Popeye's Voyage: The Quest for Pappy. The shorts included "Spinach Greetings" (a classic Christmas episode), "Popeye in the Grand Steeple Chase", "Valley of the Goons", and "William Won't Tell". 85 of the 1960s Popeye cartoons were released on DVD by Koch Vision in a three-disc DVD set entitled Popeye's 75th Anniversary.

As part of the licensing to release DVD collections of the original theatrical Popeye cartoons that had originally been released by Paramount, Warner Bros., which had come to own the shorts, also released a collection of the TV cartoons. The collection was released on May 7, 2013, and included 72 cartoons. Most of the cartoons to be released were produced by Paramount Cartoon Studios. As of 2026, no further volumes have been released.

A total of 126 shorts from the series have been released across various DVD releases, accounting for cartoons released multiple times.

=== Streaming ===
A version which includes all 220 shorts, presented in 55 half-hour cartoons, can be seen on Amazon Prime Video as Classic Popeye.

Also, all the episodes are available on the Popeye and Friends official YouTube channel, either as stand-alone shorts or as part of compilations.
