= Eugene the Jeep =

Fictional character from 1936 Popeye comic

Publication information
- Publisher: King Features Syndicate
- First appearance: Thimble Theatre (March 16, 1936)
- Created by: E. C. Segar
- Voiced by: Don Messick

In-story information
- Species: Jeep
- Abilities: Teleportation

Eugene the Jeep is a character in the Popeye comic strip. A mysterious animal with magical or supernatural abilities, the Jeep first appeared in the Thimble Theatre comic strip (March 16, 1936). He was also present in animated versions of Popeye's adventures, including three of the Fleischer Studios shorts of the late 1930s/early 1940s, with more extensive appearances in later Popeye cartoons produced for TV.

== Fictional character biography ==
=== Origin ===
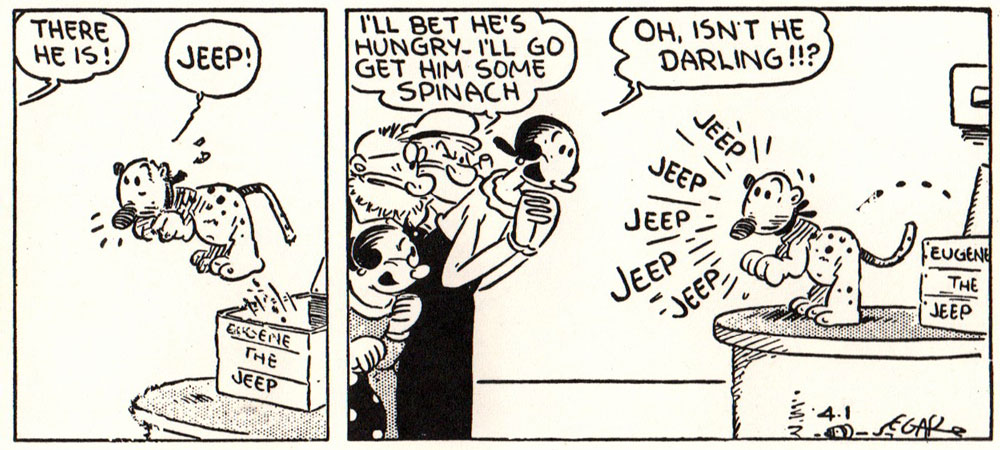
The first appearance of Eugene The Jeep from April 1, 1936, he appeared earlier as a tease in March.

In the August 9, 1936, strip, headlined "Wha's a Jeep?" [sic] Popeye asks Professor Brainstine what exactly a Jeep is. He gets the following response:

A Jeep is an animal living in a three dimensional world—in this case our world—but really belonging to a fourth dimensional world. Here's what happened. A number of Jeep life cells were somehow forced through the dimensional barrier into our world. They combined at a favorable time with free life cells of the African Hooey Hound. The electrical vibrations of the Hooey Hound cell and the foreign cell were the same. They were kindred cells. In fact, all things are, to some extent, relative, whether they be of this or some other world, now you see. The extremely favorable conditions of germination in Africa caused a fusion of these life cells. So the uniting of kindred cells caused a transmutation. The result, a mysterious strange animal.

When asked if he had any further questions, Popeye, totally unenlightened by this explanation, repeated, "Wha's a Jeep?"

The animated cartoons took the straightforward approach of defining the character as some type of dog. In The Jeep (1938), Popeye presents the animal to Olive Oyl and Swee'Pea with the simple explanation, "The Jeep's a magical dog and can disappear and things." In Popeye Presents Eugene the Jeep (1940), it is Popeye who receives the creature from Olive, in a box via a special delivery man (voiced by Pinto Colvig), and with the premise that he had never seen the creature before: "Well, blow me down! A baby puppy!"

Eugene the Jeep appeared in several Popeye TV series, including Popeye the Sailor (1960-1963), The All-New Popeye Hour (1978-1983) and Popeye and Son (1987). In the latter two series he was voiced by Don Messick.

Although Eugene did not appear in the live-action Popeye (1980) movie, the Jeep was included in early drafts of the original screenplay but was soon deemed too difficult and too expensive to render believably, so the character was dropped and elements of the Jeep character were given to Swee'Pea. The baby's mysterious ability to answer questions and make predictions through the use of whistles were scenes originally written for Eugene the Jeep.

Eugene was slated to appear in the animated Popeye film produced by Sony Pictures Animation but production of the film was cancelled in 2016.

=== Attributes and abilities ===
In the context of the comic strip, Eugene the Jeep was a gift to Popeye's girlfriend Olive Oyl from her Uncle Ben who found Eugene in Africa. The Jeep is a yellow creature about the size of a dog who walks on his hind legs. He has a bear-like head and ears but a large nose, long tail, and protruding belly. The Jeep's diet consists only of orchids.

As his language is limited to the word "jeep", Eugene primarily communicates through body language. Eugene always tells the truth, even to criminals. He possesses high intelligence, so is able to help humans such as Popeye and Olive Oyl solve complex problems. He makes use of a limited form of teleportation: he can disappear from one place and reappear in another, and can walk through and on walls and ceilings. These teleportation powers are said to stem from the Jeep's ability to cross into the fourth dimension.

== Other uses ==
Eugene the Jeep is the school mascot for Northeast Dubois High School in Dubois, Indiana, and South Webster High School in South Webster, Ohio, although the Jeep for Northeast Dubois is blue and gray, while South Webster's is red instead of yellow. An old elementary school in Wheatland, Indiana also used the Jeep as its mascot, but this school was consolidated, and the symbol is no longer in use.

Many suggest that soldiers of World War II were so impressed with the new Willys MB light utility vehicle that they informally named it after Eugene the Jeep, as it was "small, able to move between dimensions and could solve seemingly impossible problems". Further suggestions say it comes from the initials of the Ford version called the "Ford GPW".
