= Shootin' Stars =

1960 film

Shootin' Stars is an animated cartoon short which was released to cinemas by Paramount Pictures in 1960. In the same year, Paramount remade this cartoon for television as the Popeye episode Autographically Yours.
