= Sharon Kinney =

American dancer and choreographer

Sharon Kinney (born September 22, 1939) is an American dancer, choreographer, teacher, and videographer. She was an original member of the Paul Taylor Dance Company and has worked with other notable artists such as Dan Wagoner, Yuriko, and Twyla Tharp. She is noted for creating dance for stage and film, and for exploring dance for the camera. She was awarded the 2009 Balasaraswati/Joy Ann Dewey Beinecke Endowed Chair for Distinguished Teaching to honor her outstanding contributions as a teacher to "shape and preserve dance across generations."

== Background and education ==
Kinney is a native of Dayton, Ohio. She first began her training under Josephine and Hermene Schwarz, with an intense emphasis on ballet and technique. Kinney gained some of her earliest performance experiences through her time studying with Josephine Schwarz, and she describes the school as one geared towards training dancers to become professionals. Even though modern dance was not widely taught at the time, the Schwarzes introduced dancers at their school to the Humphrey-Weidman modern technique at the age of thirteen. These classes were Kinney's first foray away from ballet into the field of modern dance, and she was enticed by the chance to “fly and leap” across the dance floor. In addition, she was introduced to improvisation, bare feet, and ponytails, which all represent drastic departures from the strict dress code and class etiquette expected in ballet classes.

She thus graduated from high school with a solid and impressive background, mainly in ballet, supplemented by these modern classes and classes taken at other studios in jazz and tap and by outside performances in musicals. She enrolled at Ohio State University, where she received her Bachelor of Science in education with a major in dance and a minor in physical education. Her teacher at Ohio State University, Helen P. Alkire, was another instrumental influence in Kinney's development as a dancer. Alkire originally established the dance program through the physical education department, which has now developed into a prestigious fine arts program. Kinney accredits Alkire with introducing her to modern dance greats like Martha Graham and Merce Cunningham in addition to modern music and art. Most importantly, Alkire introduced her to the American Dance Festival, which Kinney attended through scholarship. It was there where Kinney was introduced to Paul Taylor, whose company she later joined. After graduating from Ohio State University she moved to New York City and shortly after received a call from Paul Taylor asking if she would be interested in auditioning for a dance he was choreographing to be premiered at the American Dance Festival. That piece was "Aureole," which is now known as one of Taylor's signature works. Consequently, when Taylor later left Martha Graham’s company, Kinney was invited to become a member of his new company in 1962.

== Performance ==
Kinney is known for being an original member of the Paul Taylor Dance Company. She first danced with Taylor in Aureole.

Other works:

- Insects and Heroes (1961)
- Piece Period (1962)
- Scudorama (1963)
- Party Mix (1963)
- The Red Room (1964)
- Post Meridian (1965)
- Epic (originally Paul Taylor's solo, restaged for Kinney to be performed at Richard Move's show Martha @ Mother)

In addition to Paul Taylor works, Kinney has appeared throughout her career in the choreography of Dan Wagoner, Yuriko, Sara Rudner, Viola Farber, Ruth Currier, Doris Humphrey, Doug Varone, Douglas Neilsen, Chris Burnside, Timm Callaghan, and most recently Victoria Marks.

== Choreography ==
In 1966 Ms Kinney left the Paul Taylor Company to start her family. She continued to perform and teach in New York City while raising her two sons, Joshua Binder and John Henry Binder. In 1972 she returned to Ohio State University to teach dance in the Dance Department for 3 years. It was there that she began choreographing her own work and decided to return to New York City to start her own dance company. From 1977 to 1980 she presented her solo and group works at various dance venues in New York City including Dance Theater Workshop. During those years she taught, performed and choreographed at various universities and festivals in the United States. In 1979 she was selected to choreograph the dance choreography for the movie Popeye (film) directed by Robert Altman starring Robin Williams and Shelley Duvall. It was this once in a lifetime opportunity that started her career in dance for the camera.

She has choreographed over 30 dances for the stage, such as:

- Afternoons/Evening of Dance
- Passages
- 3 ½ Solos
- Take Two
- Bits and Pieces
- To Be Continued…..
- At the Edge
- Endangered Dream
- Dance in the Sculpture Garden
- Flashpoint

Other films include

- Leap of Faith
- I’ll Do Anything as Assistant to the Choreographer

Musicals

- In Trousers
- Letter to Ben

== Teaching ==
Along with being recognized as one of the first members of the Paul Taylor Company, a performer, choreographer for the stage, and choreographer for dance for the camera, Kinney is also known for being an influential teacher. She was an associate professor of dance at Virginia Commonwealth University for 15 years and now teaches at the California State University at Long Beach. She has also taught at New York University, Juilliard, and Pratt University in addition to Ohio State University. She has taught internationally in Japan, Korea, Hong Kong, and South America, as well as at the highly regarded American Dance Festival.

== Dance For Camera ==
Having been influenced by the movie musicals of the 1950s and 1960s, most notably Singing in the Rain and Seven Brides for Seven Brothers, and her experience choreographing Popeye, she wanted to further study the process of choreographing for the camera. While teaching at Virginia Commonwealth University she choreographed, produced, and directed a dance video, Choreographic Journey In addition she worked with other faculty members who were also interested in making works created for the camera. Kinney notes that she encouraged her students at Virginia Commonwealth University to pursue further studies of dance through graduate school and additional training, which inspired her to take her own advice.

As described in her faculty profile page at the California State University in Long Beach, "in 1997 she relocated to Los Angeles and pursued her MFA at the University of California, Los Angeles in the World Arts and Cultures Department and received her degree in 2000, in Choreography for Dance and the Camera. While at UCLA she was selected to participate in the 1998 UCLA Dance/Media Fellowship Project funded by NIPAD and received a grant from NIPAD to make a 45-minute documentary of the original dance performance in NYC called From the Horse's Mouth directed by Jamie Cunningham and Tina Croll. The documentary was screened at The Wexner Center, Jacob's Pillow, the American Dance Festival, The Kitchen in NYC, New York University, Sarah Lawrence, Virginia Commonwealth University, Gunston Arts Center in Arlington Virginia, and various venues in Los Angeles. She also travels with the documentary, conducts discussions about dance documentation and the making of a dance documentary, most recently in Fort Worth Texas at The Museum of Modern Art. This last year she served on the board of the Dance Camera West in Los Angeles."

Kinney felt a strong connection to From the Horse's Mouth since she was able to participate as well as document the original performance, a historic first of many future performances; she also appreciated the story aspect. She described in an interview, "I wanted to ask each one of these people why they were still dancing?" As a young dancer she had been asked many times, “What are you going to do when you stop dancing?" She thought it would be interesting to know this because she herself had never stopped dancing and neither had they. She was interested in hearing their individual stories and how and why they were continuing to dance and adapt their love of dance to other interests and other aspects of their lives.

== Awards ==
With two other past members of the Paul Taylor company, Carolyn Adams and Ruth Andrien, Kinney received the American Dance Festival 2009 Distinguished Teaching Honor award. The award is more formally known as the 2009 Balasaraswati/Joy Ann Dewey Beinecke Endowed Chair for Distinguished Teaching and the award was created to “pay tribute to the teachers who have shaped and preserved dance across generations.” Past recipients of the distinguished award include famous members within the modern dance spectrum, such as Pearl Primus and Anna Halprin. The award "signifies the importance of honoring those who act to preserve the traditions of modern dance while continuing to expand and broaden its definition."

== Present day ==
Kinney values the guidance of her teachers, such as Helen P. Alkire, Paul Taylor, and Josephine Schwarz. Her training inspires her to continue passing down dance knowledge and stories of her experience to students. In 1947 Charles Weidman, in a master class Kinney attended, told the other dancers in the class that “you love to dance and you will always love to dance, but you will always need to teach to support your love of dance.” She feels an incredible sense of fulfillment in watching the growth and progression of her students. Today she continues to teach at California State University at Long Beach teaching Composition, Repertory and Dance for Camera classes as well as for the Paul Taylor Dance Company in New York City.
