= Alice the Goon =

Fictional character from Popeye

- First appearance of Alice the Goon in Thimble Theatre, December 10, 1933

Publication information
- Publisher: King Features Syndicate
- First appearance: Thimble Theatre (December 10, 1933)
- Created by: E. C. Segar
- Voiced by: Marilyn Schreffler

In-story information
- Species: Goon

Alice the Goon is a fictional character in E. C. Segar's comic strip Thimble Theatre and in the Popeye cartoon series derived from it.

The character is introduced as the slave and bodyguard of the sorceress Sea Hag. The Sea Hag has blackmailed Alice into service in exchange for the safety of Alice's child. Popeye helps Alice become the leader of a slave rebellion. Alice's role is loosely based on that of the rebel leader Spartacus.

== Publication history ==
Alice made her debut in the Sunday, December 10, 1933, Thimble Theatre strip, part of the "Plunder Island" storyline. Initially unnamed and of unspecified sex, she works as a bodyguard for the Sea Hag, a vicious pirate and the last sorceress on Earth. Alice is portrayed as an Amazonian giantess (8 ft 0 in (2.44 m) tall), bald, with a large nose (reminiscent of a proboscis monkey), no visible mouth, and extremely hairy forearms and legs. Her name and sex are given in the January 14, 1934, strip, after she captures Wimpy.

Alice first appears when the Sea Hag returns to Sweethaven searching for a former slave named Cringly, the only one who knows the location of her lair, Plunder Island. After capturing Wimpy and locking him in the deck of her ship, the Black Barnacle, the Sea Hag orders the goon, "Keep an eye on him, Alice!" The characters and readers now realize Alice is female. Upon arriving at Plunder Island, Popeye and Alice fight violently and Popeye threatens to throw Alice off a cliff, until her child (also of unspecified sex) appears and shouts, "Mama!" Realizing that he is fighting a woman, which goes against his principles, Popeye releases Alice and discovers that she became the Sea Hag's slave only because the Hag had threatened her baby. Alice is the leader of a race of goons enslaved by the Sea Hag; Popeye and Alice lead them in a successful Spartacus-like slave rebellion.

At the time, Alice caused controversy with protective parents, who claimed that her frightening appearance alarmed their children. Alice was therefore toned down to become a gentler and more motherly apparition.

In later appearances, Alice starts wearing a skirt and flowered hat. Her tribe live on Goon Island and the Goons are indistinguishable from each other. When Alice speaks, her words appear as a series of meaningless squiggles. Wimpy is the only one who can understand her language. After being liberated from the Sea Hag, Alice comes to live with Olive Oyl and becomes a nursemaid to baby Swee'Pea.

Alice was a main character in the later Private Olive Oyl shorts, where she and Olive join the Army with humorous results; see The All-New Popeye Hour.
