= Popeye's Voyage: The Quest for Pappy =

2004 animated direct-to-video special

- DVD cover
- Directed by: Ezekiel Norton
- Written by: Paul Reiser; Jim Hardison
- Based on: Popeye by Elzie Crisler Segar
- Produced by: Gio Corsi; Barbara Zelinski
- Starring: Billy West; Tabitha St. Germain; Garry Chalk; Sanders Whiting; Kathy Bates
- Edited by: Colin Adams
- Music by: Mark Mothersbaugh; Kevin Kliesch
- Production companies: King Features Entertainment; Mainframe Entertainment; Nuance Productions
- Distributed by: Lions Gate Home Entertainment
- Release date: November 9, 2004
- Running time: 47 minutes
- Countries: United States; Canada
- Language: English

Popeye's Voyage: The Quest for Pappy is a 2004 animated direct-to-video special produced by Mainframe Entertainment for Lions Gate Entertainment and King Features Entertainment, in association with Nuance Productions. The special, created to coincide with the 75th anniversary of the Popeye the Sailor comic strip character from E. C. Segar's Thimble Theatre, was released on November 9, 2004 to DVD and VHS and a shortened version was aired on Fox on December 17, 2004.

== Plot ==
Popeye is on a quest to find his missing father Poopdeck Pappy. Popeye is dogged by nightmares warning him that his Pappy, who abandoned him as a child, is in danger and needs him, so he bravely sets out on the open sea to find his long-lost father and reunite with him for the Christmas holidays. Accompanied by the admiring Olive Oyl, the brawny Bluto, the hungry Wimpy, and little Swee'Pea, he heads for the Sea of Mystery, which happens to be in the evil Sea Hag's domain. Strange things begin to happen along the way, as the group encounters sirens, serpents, and menacing mists. This was clearly all of the Sea Hag's attempts to destroy Popeye for good.

== Cast ==
- Billy West as Popeye and Poopdeck Pappy
- Tabitha St. Germain as Olive Oyl and Swee'Pea
- Garry Chalk as Bluto
- Sanders Whiting as J. Wellington Wimpy
- Kathy Bates as Siren and Sea Hag

== Production ==
Originally this special was set to be produced by Will Vinton, but when Vinton lost his studio in 2002, it was taken over by Mainframe Entertainment. The special was officially announced by Mainframe in September 2003, where the studio would hold Canadian TV rights and UK/Australian home video rights. Artisan Home Entertainment secured US distribution rights and would release the special in October 2004, while Fox acquired TV rights and air the special during the 2004 holiday season.

Prior to the release, animator Joel Brinkerhoff wrote about Vinton's initial version of the CGI special (in response to an April 12, 2004 Cartoon Brew post which showcased an image from MainFrame's production):

I have mixed emotions looking at the Popeye still you posted. It was a project that I personally had worked on with great anticipation; it was also the project that helped remove Will Vinton from his studio after 27 years. It's true that Paul Rieser [sic] wrote a version of the script, and not to discredit his input, he is a name that people will recognize. Jim Hardison wrote the last draft that I am aware of and I know he went back to the original Thimble Theater strip that Segar created for his characterizations. I would have been a lead animator and co-animation director had the projected [sic] stayed with Vinton. I did models from the Fleischer models sheets and mouth charts for the cg modelers so the look would have the same integrity as the classic cartoons, (see below). I don't know if any cg models from Vinton are being used. Time will tell how successfully MainFrame made their translation; it's all speculation as to what Will Vinton Studios would have done."

Billy West described the production as "the hardest job I ever did, ever" and the voice of Popeye as "like a buzzsaw in your throat."

== See also ==
- List of Christmas films
