= Swee'Pea =

Fictional character from Popeye

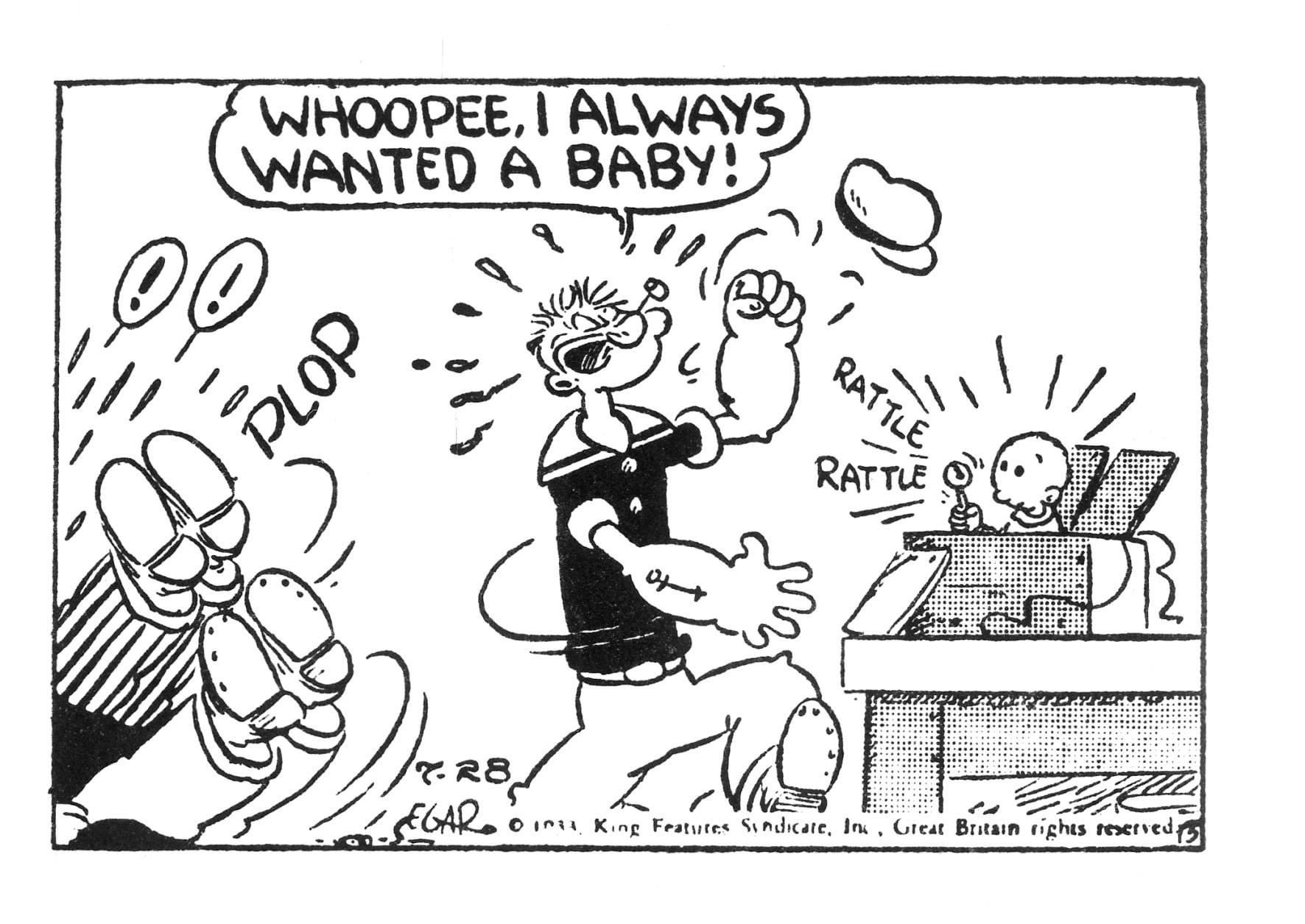
- Swee'Pea in his debut strip from July 24, 1933.

Publication information
- Publisher: King Features Syndicate
- First appearance: Thimble Theatre (July 24, 1933)
- Created by: E. C. Segar
- Voiced by: Mae Questel (1936–1938, 1950s–1960s); Margie Hines (1938–1943); Marilyn Schreffler (1970s–1980s); Corinne Orr (1972); Phil Snyder (1997–1998); Tabitha St. Germain (2004)

In-story information
- Species: Human
- Partnerships: Popeye (adoptive father); Olive Oyl (adoptive mother); Patcheye (adoptive great-great-grandfather); Granny (adoptive great-grandmother); Poopdeck Pappy (adoptive paternal grandfather); Unnamed adoptive paternal grandmother; Cole Oyl (adoptive maternal grandfather); Nana Oyl (adoptive maternal grandmother); Castor Oyl (adoptive maternal uncle); Pipeye, Peepeye, Poopeye and Pupeye (adoptive cousins); Popeye Junior (adoptive brother)

Swee'Pea (alternatively spelled Swee'pea and Sweapea on some titles and once called Sweep Pea) is a character in E. C. Segar's comic strip Thimble Theatre / Popeye and in the cartoon series derived from it. His name refers to the flower known as the sweet pea. Before his addition to the animated shorts, the name "Sweet Pea" was a term of affection used by main character Popeye. In the cartoon We Aim to Please, he addressed girlfriend Olive Oyl that way.

As the years went on, Swee'Pea apparently aged enough to speak normally, and could throw punches if necessary; however, his appearance remained that of a crawling baby. In the strip for August 17, 1933, Popeye christens Swee'Pea as "Schooner Seawell Georgia Washenting Christiffer Columbia Daniel Boom". Although Swee'Pea remains his most common sobriquet, he is occasionally referred to as Scooner by Popeye and others in later strips. In the Sunday strips, which did not coordinate with the dailies, Swee'Pea was not introduced until 1934.

== Film ==
In the animated Popeye cartoons produced by Max Fleischer and later by Famous Studios, Swee'Pea was portrayed as being in the care of Olive Oyl, although it was unclear whether he was her own child. In Baby Wants Spinach (1950) Olive Oyl asks Popeye to watch her “cousin Swee’Pea.” (In the King Features cartoons of the early 1960s, it is implied that Swee'Pea is Popeye's nephew.) From 1936–1938 Mae Questel provided the voice for Swee'Pea which was then taken over by voice actress Margie Hines from 1938 to 1943. Mae Questel was recast as Swee'Pea in the (1960s) Popeye shorts. Marilyn Schreffler replaced Mae Questel as the voice of Swee'Pea in the 1970s and 80s, Corinne Orr also did the role as Swee'Pea in Popeye Meets The Man Who Hated Laughter (1972). Swee'Pea was also voiced by Tabitha St. Germain in Popeye's Voyage: The Quest for Pappy (2004).

In the feature film Popeye (1980), Swee'Pea is found inside a basket that his mother has secretly switched with an identical one belonging to Olive Oyl; a note attached to him asks Popeye to look after Swee'Pea until his mother can return to claim him. Popeye proposes the name Swee'Pea for the child; Olive objects, saying it sounds ridiculous, and he retorts, "Well, what were you going to call him? Baby Oyl?" In the film, Swee'Pea can also foretell the future; answering questions in the affirmative by a quick rising whistle. In the film he was played by Wesley Ivan Hurt.

In other accounts, Swee'Pea is depicted as royalty. After Swee'Pea's birth father is killed, Swee'Pea is made the Crown Prince of Demonia. As Swee'Pea is of royal birth, he needed protection from an evil uncle who wanted to eliminate him and take control of the kingdom. Swee'Pea's mother left him on the doorstep of the Oyl home, knowing Popeye the trustworthy sailor would protect him. Alice the Goon (originally depicted as a slave of the Sea Hag) reappeared in a flower dress and hat and officially became Swee'Pea's babysitter after protests by parents who said the hairy monster frightened children.

=== Appearances ===
- Popeye the Sailor with Little Swee'Pea (1936)
- Lost and Foundry (1937)
- I Likes Babies and Infinks (1937)
- The Football Toucher Downer (1937)
- Popeye the Sailor with the Jeep (1938)
- Wotta Nitemare! (1939)
- Never Sock a Baby (1939)
- Nurse Mates (1940)
- Doing Imposskible Stunts (1940)
- Puttin' on the Act (1940)
- Child Psykolojiky (1941)
- Baby Wants a Bottleship (1942)
- Baby Wants Spinach (1950)
- Thrill of Fair (1951)
- Child Sockology (1953)
- Nurse to Meet Ya (1955)
- Popeye (1980)
- Popeye's Voyage: The Quest for Pappy (2004)

== Parodies ==
In MAD Magazine #21 (1951), a parody of Swee'Pea named "Swee' Back" appeared in Poopeye. Unlike Swee' Pea', this version could speak in an adult and coherent way and perpetually lured Poopeye into fights with other comic strip characters (claiming that each one had struck him), including "Mammy Jokeum" (a parody of "Mammy Yokum" from Li'l Abner), "Melvin of the Apes" (a parody of Tarzan) and "Superduperman" (a parody of Superman). After Poopeye had defeated all of them thanks to spinach-containing foods provided by "Mazola Oil" (a parody of Olive Oyl), Swee' Back revealed his true identity as an adult midget named Mister Swee' Back (also "Mad Man" Swee' Back) who was the Broccoli King and that he had set Poopeye up to be defeated because of Poopeye's spinach use causing broccoli to be outsold. Although punched out by Swee' Back, Poopeye found some spinach and obliterated the evil Swee' Back. The story was reprinted in the paperback MAD Strikes Back (1962), which was later reprinted in a 50th Anniversary Edition (iBooks, Inc., New York, ISBN 0-7434-4478-7).
