= Popeye and Son =

- Show's title card featuring Popeye, Junior, and Olive
- Genre: Comedy
- Based on: Popeye, by E. C. Segar
- Developed by: Jeff Segal; Kelly Ward; John Loy
- Directed by: Art Davis; Connie Dufau; John Kimball; Don Lusk; Paul Sommer; Carl Urbano
- Theme music composer: Hoyt Curtin
- Opening theme: "Like Pop, Like Son"
- Ending theme: "Pop-a-Wheelie"
- Composer: Hoyt Curtin
- Country of origin: United States
- Original language: English
- No. of seasons: 1
- No. of episodes: 13 (26 segments)

Production
- Executive producers: William Hanna; Joseph Barbera; Bruce L. Paisner
- Producer: Charles Grosvenor
- Editor: Gil Iverson
- Running time: 22 minutes (11 minutes per segment)
- Production companies: Hanna-Barbera Productions; King Features Entertainment

Original release
- Network: CBS
- Release: September 19 – December 12, 1987

Related
- The All New Popeye Hour (1978–1983); Popeye’s Island Adventures (2018)

Popeye and Son is an American animated comedy series based on the Popeye comic strip created by E.C. Segar and published by King Features Syndicate. Jointly produced by Hanna-Barbera and King Features subsidiary King Features Entertainment, the series aired for one season of thirteen episodes on CBS from September 19 to December 12, 1987. It is a follow-up to The All New Popeye Hour. Due to Jack Mercer's death in 1984, Maurice LaMarche voiced Popeye, while much of the cast of The All New Popeye Hour reprised their respective roles, with the exception of Daws Butler. However, Nancy Cartwright, who was trained by Butler, voiced Woody in the series.

== Overview ==
Now married, Popeye and his longtime girlfriend-turned-wife Olive Oyl have a son named Popeye Jr. (or simply "Junior"), who has inherited Popeye's ability to gain superhuman strength from eating spinach; much to his father's disappointment, however, Junior hates the taste of spinach (instead, he prefers hamburgers, like Wimpy), although he eats spinach anyway should any trouble come his way. Popeye's longtime rival Bluto also has a wife, Lizzie, and a son, Tank. Like old times, Popeye and Bluto possess an intense rivalry, something that also happens between their sons.

== Voice cast ==
- Susan Blu – Shelley (in "The Girl from Down Under")
- Steve Bulen – Fred Furple (in "Redbeard")
- Nancy Cartwright – Woody
- Philip L. Clarke – Snipes (in "Prince of a Fellow")
- Jeff Cohen – Francis Wimpy
- Barry Dennen – Captain of the Sea Witch (in "Redbeard")
- George DiCenzo – Two-Headed Giant (in "Damsel in Distress")
- Richard Erdman – Professor Watersnozzle (in "Dr. Junior and Mr. Hyde")
- Ed Gilbert – Skeleton Warrior (in "Ain't Mythbehavin'")
- Scott Grimes – Lon (in "There Goes the Neighborhood")
- Rebecca Gilchrist
- Zale Kessler – Mr. Snoot, Lon's Father (in "There Goes the Neighborhood")
- Kaleena Kiff – Dee Dee
- Maurice LaMarche – Popeye, Poopdeck Pappy, Granny Popeye, Cole Oyl (in "Happy Anniversary"), Captain Blight (in "Happy Anniversary")
- Allan Lurie – Redbeard (in "Redbeard")
- David Markus – Tank Bluto
- Allan Melvin – Bluto, J. Wellington Wimpy
- Scott Menville – Rex (in "Prince of a Fellow")
- Don Messick – Eugene the Jeep
- Howard Morris – Bandini the Genie
- Josh Rodine – Popeye Jr.
- Maggie Roswell – Jewelry Store Clerk (in "Junior Gets a Job")
- Marilyn Schreffler – Olive Oyl, Lizzie Bluto, Puggy, The Sea Hag, Nana Oyl (in "Happy Anniversary")
- Penina Segall – Polly
- Carl Steven – Nick (in "Split Decision")
- Jeffrey Tambor – Berkeley Busby (in "Surf Movie")
- Rip Taylor – Mayor of Sweethaven (in "Attack of the Sea Hag")
- B.J. Ward – Rad
- Jimmy Weldon – Birthday Clown (in "Junior's Birthday Roundup")
- Frank Welker – Shelley's Father (in "The Girl from Down Under")
- Patric Zimmerman – Ghost Pirates (in "The Lost Treasure of Pirate's Cove")

== List of episodes ==
No.	Title	Directed by	Written by	Storyboard by	Original release date
1	"Attack of the Sea Hag" "Happy Anniversary"	John Kimball and Paul Sommer	John Loy	Charles Grosvenor	September 19, 1987
Tank takes a driftwood mermaid Junior found on the beach, claiming it as his own for Bluto's boat party with the Mayor. However Junior must go off and save the day when the mermaid belongs to Popeye's old foe: The Sea Hag. Popeye and Olive get into a fight on the night of their anniversary. While trying to get the two back together, Junior learns how the two finally got married.
2	"The Sea Monster" "Poopdeck Pappy and the Family Tree"	John Kimball and Don Lusk	Cliff Roberts Eric Lewald	Chris Otsuki and Scott Jeralds	September 26, 1987
Polly finds and befriends a sea monster, one Bluto wants to capture and sell. Pappy goes to Junior's school to tell his class about a past adventure.
3	"Bluto's Wave Pool" "Here Today, Goon Tomorrow"	John Kimball	Anthony Adams Story by : Bruce Falk; Teleplay by : John Loy	Chris Otsuki	October 3, 1987
Bluto opens up a wave pool and makes a mess at the beach to bring in more customers. Popeye and Junior have to travel to Goon Island to rescue Woody.
4	"Don't Give Up the Picnic" "The Lost Treasure of Pirate's Cove"	John Kimball and Don Lusk	John Loy Eric Lewald	Larry Latham and Mitch Schauer	October 10, 1987
Wimpy and his nephew challenge Bluto to the picnic games. After finding a treasure map, Junior and Dee Dee want to find the treasure, but Polly and Woody are scared of potential ghosts.
5	"Junior's Genie" "Mighty Olive at the Bat"	Paul Sommer and Don Lusk	Story by : Kelly Ward and Mark Cassutt; Teleplay by : Eric Lewald Eric Lewald	Larry Latham	October 17, 1987
Junior finds a genie's bottle on the beach, but gets carried away with his wishes. When Popeye injures his arm during baseball practice, Olive decides to fill in for an upcoming game.
6	"Junior Gets a Job" "Surf Movie"	Art Davis and Bob Goe	John Loy Charles M. Howell, IV	Chris Otsuki and Scott Jeralds	October 24, 1987
Junior works at Bluto's car shop to earn enough money to buy a birthday present for Olive. Popeye and Bluto both want their sons to star in a Hollywood movie being shot on Sweet Haven.
7	"Junior's Birthday Roundup" "Redbeard"	Art Davis and Bob Goe	Kelly Ward Eric Lewald	Jesse Cosio and Charles Grosvenor	October 31, 1987
Junior and Tank tell their sides of several incidents at Junior's birthday party. Popeye's friend, Redbeard, comes to visit.
8	"The Girl from Down Under" "Olive's Dinosaur Dilemma"	Connie Dufau and Art Davis	Anthony Adams Bryce Malek	Scott Geralds and Kurt Anderson	November 7, 1987
The kids befriend Shelley, a new girl on Sweet Haven who claims to be from Down Under. Olive ends up on an island populated by dinosaurs.
9	"Dr. Junior and Mr. Hyde" "Popeye's Surfin' Adventure"	Connie Dufau and Art Davis	Eric Lewald John Loy	Charles Grosvenor and Chris Otsuki	November 14, 1987
After helping a scientist with an experiment, Junior and Woody keep seeing monsters around Sweet Haven. With Junior being more interested in surfing than sailing, Popeye tries to prove how easy surfing is.
10	"Split Decision" "The Case of the Burger Burglar"	Connie Dufau and Carl Urbano	Pamela Hickey and Dennys McCoy Bryce Malek	Kurt Anderson and Alex Lovy	November 21, 1987
When Polly gets onto the school basketball team, she starts to neglect her friends. Wimpy's burger joint is robbed and it's up to Junior and Francis to find the thief.
11	"Orchid You Not" "Ain't Mythbehavin'"	Paul Sommer and Art Davis	Scott Shaw Ken Koonce and David Weimers	Scott Jeralds, Bob Onorato, Alfred Gimeno and Alex Lovy	November 28, 1987
Eugene goes around stealing orchids from everyone. Popeye tells Junior the story of how he found the Golden Fleece.
12	"There Goes the Neighborhood" "Prince of a Fellow"	Paul Sommer and Don Lusk	Eric Lewald Kelly Ward	Scott Geralds and Kurt Anderson	December 5, 1987
A new family move into a haunted house on Sweet Haven. Junior swaps places with a visiting prince who looks just like him.
13	"Olive's Day Off" "Damsel in Distress"	John Kimball and Paul Sommer	Bryce Malek Eric Lewald and John Loy	Chris Otsuki and Kurt Anderson	December 12, 1987
Olive takes a break after feeling overworked around the house, leaving Popeye and Junior to do all the work. Popeye and Bluto are entered into a competition to decide which one is stronger.

== Reception ==
In 2014, including it in an article about twelve 1980s cartoons that supposedly did not deserve remembrance, io9 was largely critical of the series, noting that it did not utilize the conventions established by the theatrical Popeye short films.

== Home media ==
In late 2008, Warner Home Video planned to release four Popeye and Son episodes (8 cartoons) on DVD. (Volume One, released earlier in 2008, contained episodes of the previous Hanna-Barbera Popeye series, The All New Popeye Hour.) As of 2025, the complete series has yet to come out on DVD. In the 1990s, several episodes were released on VHS. The series is available to watch on NBCUniversal's streaming service, Peacock.
