= Popeye (film) =

1980 film by Robert Altman

- Theatrical release poster
- Directed by: Robert Altman
- Screenplay by: Jules Feiffer
- Based on: Popeye by E. C. Segar
- Produced by: Robert Evans
- Starring: Robin Williams; Shelley Duvall
- Cinematography: Giuseppe Rotunno
- Edited by: John W. Holmes; David A. Simmons
- Music by: Harry Nilsson
- Production companies: Paramount Pictures; Walt Disney Productions; Robert Evans Productions; King Features
- Distributed by: Paramount Pictures (United States and Canada); Buena Vista International (International)
- Release dates: December 6, 1980 (Los Angeles); December 12, 1980 (United States)
- Running time: 114 minutes
- Country: United States
- Language: English
- Budget: $20 million
- Box office: $60 million

Popeye is a 1980 American musical comedy film directed by Robert Altman and produced by Paramount Pictures and Walt Disney Productions. It is based on E. C. Segar's Popeye comics character. The script was written by Jules Feiffer, and stars Robin Williams as Popeye the Sailor Man and Shelley Duvall as Olive Oyl. Its story follows Popeye's adventures as he arrives in the town of Sweethaven.

Popeye premiered December 6, 1980, in Los Angeles, California, and opened in the rest of the United States the following week, distributed by Paramount Pictures, with Disney handling international distribution through Buena Vista International. During opening weekend, the film grossed $6.3 million, ultimately taking in $60 million worldwide, against a budget of $20 million. When originally released, Popeye received mixed reviews from critics, though its reception has improved over time.

== Plot ==
Popeye, a gruff but good-hearted sailor, arrives at the small coastal town of Sweethaven while searching for his missing father. He rents a room at the Oyl family's boarding house, where the Oyls plan to have their daughter, Olive, become engaged to Captain Bluto, a powerful, perpetually angry bully who manages the town in the name of the mysterious Commodore.

The night of the engagement party, Olive sneaks out after discovering that the only attribute that she can report for her bullying fiancé is size. She encounters Popeye, who has failed to fit in with the townsfolk at the party. The two eventually find an abandoned baby in a basket. Popeye and Olive adopt the child, naming him Swee'Pea, after the town Sweethaven, and the three return to the Oyls' home. Bluto, whom Olive has stood up, finds out about this encounter and, out of rage, beats up Popeye and imposes heavy taxes on the Oyls' property and possessions. A greedy taxman follows up on Bluto's demand, but Popeye helps the Oyls' financial situation, winning a hefty prize by defeating a boxer named Oxblood Oxheart.

The next day, Popeye discovers that Swee'Pea can predict the future by whistling when he hears the correct answer to a question. J. Wellington Wimpy, the constantly hungry local mooch and petty gambler, also notices this, and asks Popeye and Olive if he can take Swee'Pea for a walk. He takes him to the horse races and wins two bets. Hearing of this, Olive and her family decide to get in on the action and use Swee'Pea to win, but an outraged Popeye takes Swee'Pea away.

After Popeye throws the taxman into the sea (thereby earning the town's respect), Wimpy kidnaps the child at Bluto's orders. That evening, when Olive checks in on Popeye privately, she overhears him lamenting that Swee'Pea deserves to have two parents, and that he regrets leaving the way he did. The next morning, Wimpy informs Popeye about the kidnapping after being threatened by Olive. Popeye goes to the Commodore's ship, where he learns that the Commodore, who has been tied up by Bluto, is indeed Popeye's father, Poopdeck Pappy, who accepts that Popeye is his son after exposing Popeye's hatred of spinach. Meanwhile, Bluto kidnaps Olive, and sets sail with her and Swee'Pea to find the buried treasure promised by Pappy. Popeye, Pappy, Wimpy and the Oyl family board Pappy's ship to chase Bluto to a desolate island in the middle of the ocean, called Scab Island.

Popeye catches up to Bluto and fights him, but is overpowered. During the fight, Pappy recovers his treasure, and opens the chest to reveal a collection of personal, sentimental items from Popeye's infancy, including a few cans of spinach. Salty Sam, a gigantic octopus, awakens and attacks Olive from underwater after Pappy saves Swee'Pea from a similar fate. With Popeye in a choke hold, Pappy throws a can of spinach to him; recognizing Popeye's dislike for spinach, Bluto force-feeds it to him before throwing him into the water. The spinach revitalizes Popeye and boosts his strength, helping him to defeat both Bluto and Salty Sam. Popeye celebrates his victory and his newfound appreciation of spinach while Bluto swims off, having figuratively and literally turned yellow.

== Cast ==
- Robin Williams as Popeye
  - Jack Mercer as the voice of Popeye in the opening, reprising his role from the original theatrical cartoons. The film marked Mercer's final film role before his death in 1984.
- Shelley Duvall as Olive Oyl
- Paul L. Smith as Bluto
  - John Wallace as Bluto's singing voice
- Paul Dooley as J. Wellington Wimpy
- Richard Libertini as George W. Geezil - The Greengrocer
- Ray Walston as Poopdeck Pappy
- Donald Moffat as The Taxman
- MacIntyre Dixon as Cole Oyl
- Roberta Maxwell as Nana Oyl
- Donovan Scott as Castor Oyl
- Allan F. Nicholls as Rough House (credited as Allan Nicholls)
- Wesley Ivan Hurt as Swee'Pea
- Bill Irwin as Ham Gravy - Olive's Old Boyfriend
- Peter Bray as Oxblood Oxheart - The Fighter
- Linda Hunt as Mrs. Oxheart - Oxblood's Mother
- David Arkin as The Mailman / Policeman
- Geoff Hoyle as Scoop - The Reporter
- Wayne Robson as Chizzelflint - The Pawnbroker
- Klaus Voormann as Von Schnitzel - The Conductor
- Van Dyke Parks as Hoagy - The Piano Player
- Doug Dillard as Clem - The Banjo Player
- Dennis Franz as Spike - A Tough
- Carlos Brown as Slug - A Tough
- Ned Dowd as Butch - A Tough
- Hovey Burgess as Mort - A Tough
- Roberto Messina as Gozo - A Tough
- Pietro Torrisi as Bolo - A Tough
- Robert Fortier as Bill Barnacle - The Town Drunk
- David McCharen as Harry Hotcash - The Gambler
- Sharon Kinney as Cherry - His Moll
- Stan Wilson as Oscar - The Barber
- Ray Cooper as The Preacher
- John Bristol as Bear - The Hermit
- Carlo Pellegrino as Swifty - The Cook
- Larry Pisoni as Chico - The Dishwasher
- Susan Kingsley as La Verne - The Waitress
- Michael Christensen as Splatz - The Janitor
- Noel Parenti as Slick - The Milkman
- Karen McCormick as Rosie - The Milkmaid
- Paul Zegler as Mayor Stonefeller - The Official
- Pamela Burrell as Mrs. Stonefeller
- Nathalie Blossom as Blossom Walfleur - A Steinette
- Julia Janney as Mena Walfleur - A Steinette
- Patty Katz as Mina Walfleur - A Steinette
- Diane Shaffer as Mona Walfleur - A Steinette
- Roberto Dell'Acqua as The Chimneysweep (credited as Roberto Dell'Aqua)
- Valerie Velardi as Cindy - The Drudge
- Margery Bond as Daisy - A Housewife
- Judy Burgess as Petunia - A Housewife
- Saundra MacDonald as Violet - A Housewife
- Eve Knoller as Min - A Housewife
- Peggy Pisoni as Pickelina - A Housewife
- Barbara Zegler as Daphne - A Housewife

== Production ==
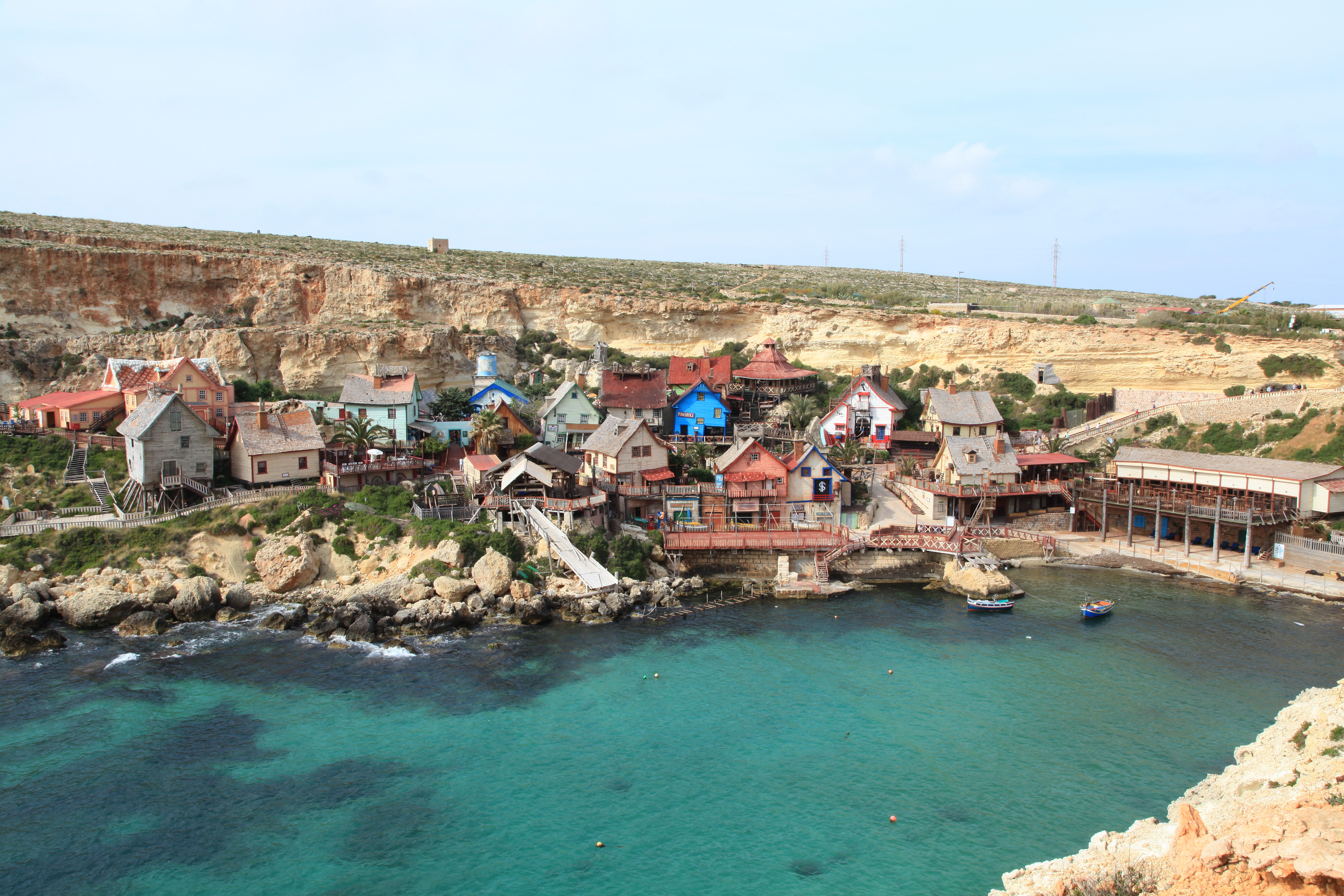
Popeye Village in Malta

In his book, Fiasco: A History of Hollywood's Iconic Flops, James Robert Parish says that the Popeye musical had its basis in the bidding war for the film adaptation of the Broadway musical, Annie, between the two major studios vying for the rights, Columbia and Paramount. When Robert Evans learned that Paramount had lost the bidding for Annie, he held an executive meeting with Charles Bluhdorn, head of Paramount's parent company, Gulf+Western, and executives Barry Diller, Michael Eisner and Jeffrey Katzenberg, at which he asked about comic strip characters to which the studio held the rights, and which could be used to create a movie musical; one attendee said, "Popeye".

At that time, although King Features Syndicate (a unit of Hearst Communications) retained the television rights to Popeye and related characters, with Hanna-Barbera producing the series The All-New Popeye Hour under license from King Features, Paramount had long held the theatrical rights to the Popeye character, due to the studio having released the Popeye cartoon shorts produced by Fleischer Studios and Famous Studios from 1933 to 1957. At that time, MGM/UA owned the television rights to Popeye cartoons through Associated Artists Productions, which was later acquired by Turner Entertainment Co. and currently, Warner Bros.

Evans commissioned Jules Feiffer to write a script. In 1977, he said that he wanted Dustin Hoffman to play Popeye, opposite Lily Tomlin as Olive Oyl, with John Schlesinger directing. Hoffman dropped out due to creative differences with Feiffer. Gilda Radner was also considered for the Olive Oyl role. Radner's manager, Bernie Brillstein, discouraged her from taking the part, due to his concerns about the quality of the script, and worries of her working for months on an isolated set with Evans and Altman, both known for erratic behavior and unorthodox creative methods.

In December 1979, Walt Disney Productions joined as part of a two-picture production deal (including Dragonslayer), with Paramount Pictures handling the North American distribution, and Buena Vista International at the international distribution.

Principal photography commenced on January 23, 1980. The film was shot in Malta. According to Barry Diller, cocaine was heavily used on set, saying, "You couldn't escape it." He also said that "film cans were actually being used to ship cocaine back and forth to this set." The elaborate Sweethaven set was constructed beyond what was needed for filming, adding to the cost and complexity of the production, along with a recording studio, editing facilities and other buildings, including living quarters. Filming wrapped on June 19, 1980, three weeks over schedule, due to bad weather. The Sweethaven set is still standing and has become a popular tourist attraction known as Popeye Village. Parish wrote that Robin Williams referred to this set as "Stalag Altman".

Parish noted other production problems. Evans insisted that the screenplay reflect the comic-strip Popeye, and not the "distorted" cartoon version. Feiffer's script went through several rewrites, and he expressed concern that too much screen time was being devoted to minor characters. Feiffer also disliked Harry Nilsson's songs, saying that they were not right for the film. Popeye's original muscle arms formed of silicone rubber were difficult for Williams to manipulate and remove after filming, so two Italian artisans were brought to Malta to remake them, and Altman had to juggle his shooting schedule. He also had the cast sing some musical numbers during filming, breaking with the traditional movie-musical practice of actors recording the songs in a studio first, and lip-synching. This reduced the sound quality, due to difficulties in accurately capturing the voices. Williams rerecorded much of his dialogue, due to trouble with his character's mumbling style, partly as a byproduct of talking with a pipe in his mouth. His penchant for ad-libs led to clashes with Altman. The final battle involving the octopus was complicated by the mechanical beast's malfunction. After the production cost rose beyond $20 million, Paramount ordered Altman to wrap filming and return to California with what he had.

== Release ==
Popeye premiered at the Mann's Chinese Theater in Los Angeles on December 6, 1980, two days before what would have been E. C. Segar's 86th birthday. The film was released theatrically on December 12, 1980, by Paramount Pictures in North America. For its international release, the film was shortened to 92 minutes by Buena Vista International.

=== Home media ===
Popeye has been released on several home media formats, including VHS, Betamax, CED, LaserDisc, DVD, Blu-ray, and through digital streaming services in both standard and high definition video resolutions. An Ultra HD Blu-ray was released on August 18, 2026 by Paramount Home Entertainment, in honor of the film's 45th anniversary. In the United Kingdom, the film was released on VHS and DVD by Walt Disney Home Video, featuring the shortened version of the film.

== Reception ==
=== Box office ===
The film grossed $6 million on its opening weekend in the United States, and made $32,000,000 after 32 days. The film earned $49,823,037 at the United States box office — more than double the film's budget — and a worldwide total of $60 million.

Film Comment wrote, "Before the film's release, industry wags were mocking producer Robert Evans by calling it 'Evansgate'," but, "Apparently the film has caught on solidly with young children."

Although the film's gross was quite successful, especially considering the much lower price of theater tickets at the time, the film was not the mega-blockbuster that Paramount and Disney had expected, and thus some wrote it off as a disappointment. Altman, once critically admired, was shunned in Hollywood. His decade-long career decline included a move to Paris, where he directed low-budget film adaptations of stage plays.

=== Critical response ===
Reviews at the time were generally negative, but the film has been more positively reappraised over time. On the review aggregator website Rotten Tomatoes, 65% of 40 critics' reviews are positive. The website's consensus reads: "Altman's take on the iconic cartoon is messy and wildly uneven, but its robust humor and manic charm are hard to resist." Metacritic, which uses a weighted average, assigned the film a score of 64 out of 100, based on 14 critics, indicating "generally favorable" reviews.

Roger Ebert of the Chicago Sun-Times gave the film 3.5 stars out of 4, writing that Duvall was "born to play" Olive Oyl, and with Popeye, Altman had proved "it is possible to take the broad strokes of a comic strip and turn them into sophisticated entertainment." Gene Siskel of the Chicago Tribune awarded 3.5 out of 4, writing that the first 30 minutes were "tedious and totally without a point of view", but once Swee'Pea was introduced the film "then becomes quite entertaining and, in a few scenes, very special". Richard Combs of The Monthly Film Bulletin wrote, "In its own idiosyncratic fashion, it works." Vincent Canby of The New York Times called it "a thoroughly charming, immensely appealing mess of a movie, often high-spirited and witty, occasionally pretentious and flat, sometimes robustly funny and frequently unintelligible. It is, in short, a very mixed bag."

Other critics were unfavorable, such as Leonard Maltin, who described the picture as a bomb: "E.C. Segar's beloved sailorman boards a sinking ship in this astonishingly boring movie. A game cast does its best with an unfunny script, cluttered staging, and some alleged songs. Tune in a couple hours' worth of Max Fleischer cartoons instead; you'll be much better off." Variety wrote that all involved "fail to bring the characters to life at the sacrifice of a large initial chunk of the film. It's only when they allow the characters to fall back on their cartoon craziness that the picture works at all." Gary Arnold of The Washington Post wrote, "While there are things to like in this elaborately stylized, exasperating musical slapstick fantasy ... they emerge haphazardly and flit in and out of a precarious setting." Charles Champlin of the Los Angeles Times described the film as "rarely uninteresting but seldom entirely satisfying", and thought that the adult tone of the dialogue left it "uncertain what the film's target audience is intended to be." TV Guide says, "This film from director Robert Altman and scenarist Jules Feiffer adapts 'Popeye' to feature length – a good idea gone down the drain under Altman's spotty direction. Only in the last 50 minutes does Popeye create some excitement."

=== Accolades ===
The film won Worst Picture at the Stinkers Bad Movie Awards in its original ballot, and again in its expanded ballot in 2006. The film also received a Saturn Award nomination for Best Fantasy Film.

| Date | Award | Category | Recipients | Result | Ref. |
|---|---|---|---|---|---|
| July 1981 | Saturn Awards | Best Fantasy Film | Popeye (Paramount) | Nominated | |
| 1981 | Stinkers Bad Movie Awards | Worst Picture | Popeye (Paramount) | Won | |
| 2006 (expanded ballot) | Stinkers Bad Movie Awards | Worst Picture | Popeye (Paramount) | Won | |
| 2006 (expanded ballot) | Stinkers Bad Movie Awards | Worst Actor | Robin Williams | Nominated | |
| 2006 (expanded ballot) | Stinkers Bad Movie Awards | Worst Director | Robert Altman | Nominated | |
| 2006 (expanded ballot) | Stinkers Bad Movie Awards | Worst Screenplay | Popeye (Paramount) | Nominated | |
| 2006 (expanded ballot) | Stinkers Bad Movie Awards | Worst Song or Song Performance in a Film or Its End Credits | "He Needs Me" by Shelley Duvall | Won | |
| 2006 (expanded ballot) | Stinkers Bad Movie Awards | Worst Remake | Popeye (Paramount) | Won | |

=== Legacy ===
Critics listed the film among Altman's failures and he disagreed: "You know, I am actually shocked when somebody says "Popeye" is a failure. I have this review from Rolling Stone and he lists my failures: "Secret Honor," "Quintet" and "Popeye." Well, "Quintet" I can understand, but "Popeye" is a highly successful piece of work, especially in its afterlife." The film grossed $60 million in its theatrical run and has been a consistent seller on home video.

Several authors have contrasted Popeye with subsequent comic book movies. One article calls it a "road not taken" in comic book adaptations. The author praised Popeye, Dick Tracy (1990), and Hulk (2003) for using comic techniques, such as "masking, paneling, and page layout" in ways that the DC Extended Universe and Marvel Cinematic Universe do not. An article for WBUR agreed that Popeye and Hulk were more "artistic" than modern comic movies, and said that Popeye has been "mistakenly" overlooked.

Filmmaker Paul Thomas Anderson is a noted fan of the film, listing it as a favorite, even using Duvall's song, "He Needs Me", in his own film, Punch-Drunk Love and its soundtrack.

Director Phil Lord is also a fan of the film and has cited it as an inspiration: "It comes from trying not to be vain about what you're making on the surface. Like, who cares if [The Lego Movie is] based on a popular toy brand? It's still an opportunity to make something really interesting. I think we've always approached these things as a way to express ourselves personally, which no one does! Maybe it comes from watching Robert Altman's Popeye a lot."

== Soundtrack ==
=== Original release ===
Popeye

Soundtrack album by Harry Nilsson
- Released: 1980 (reissued in 2000, 2016, 2017)
- Recorded: 1980
- Genres: Pop, show tune
- Labels: Boardwalk/CBS (1980); Walt Disney/Geffen/Universal (2000); Varèse Sarabande/Universal (2016, 2017); Walt Disney (2017)
- Producer: Harry Nilsson

Harry Nilsson chronology
| Flash Harry (1980) | Popeye (1980) | Losst and Founnd (2019) |

Professional ratings
Review scores
| Source | Rating |
|---|---|
| AllMusic | 4/5 stars |

The soundtrack was composed by Harry Nilsson, who took a break from producing his album Flash Harry to score the film. He wrote all the original songs and co-produced the music with producer Bruce Robb at Cherokee Studios. The soundtrack in the film was unusual, for the actors sang some of the songs live. For that reason, the studio album did not quite match the tracks heard in the film. Van Dyke Parks is credited as music arranger.

The U.S. trailer contains the song "I Yam What I Yam" from the soundtrack album, not the film's live performance.

"I'm Popeye the Sailor Man" was composed by Sammy Lerner for the original Max Fleischer cartoon, Popeye the Sailor.

| No. | Title | Length |
|---|---|---|
| 1. | "I Yam What I Yam" | 2:16 |
| 2. | "He Needs Me" | 3:33 |
| 3. | "Swee' Pea's Lullaby" | 2:06 |
| 4. | "Din' We" | 3:06 |
| 5. | "Sweethaven—An Anthem" | 2:56 |
| 6. | "Blow Me Down" | 4:07 |
| 7. | "Sailin'" | 2:48 |
| 8. | "It's Not Easy Being Me" | 2:20 |
| 9. | "He's Large" | 4:19 |
| 10. | "I'm Mean" | 2:33 |
| 11. | "Kids" | 4:23 |
| 12. | "I'm Popeye the Sailor Man" | 1:19 |

The song "Everything Is Food" was not included on the album, and the song "Din' We" (which was cut from the film) was included. In 2016, a vinyl-only limited-edition version of the album was released with two bonus tracks by Varèse Sarabande, for Record Store Day Black Friday.

=== 2017 deluxe edition ===
In 2017, Varèse Sarabande released a deluxe edition that placed the songs in the original order of the film, reinstated "Everything Is Food", and included a second disc of demo versions of the songs sung by Nilsson and the cast. In 2018, fourteen of the demos were released on vinyl as Music from the Motion Picture Popeye – The Harry Nilsson Demos.

Disc 1

| No. | Title | Length |
|---|---|---|
| 1. | "Sweethaven" | 2:53 |
| 2. | "Blow Me Down" | 4:09 |
| 3. | "Everything Is Food" | 3:08 |
| 4. | "Rough House Fight" | 0:43 |
| 5. | "He's Large" | 4:20 |
| 6. | "I'm Mean" | 2:35 |
| 7. | "Sailin'" | 2:47 |
| 8. | "March Through Town" | 0:48 |
| 9. | "I Yam What I Yam" | 2:16 |
| 10. | "The Grand Finale" | 1:34 |
| 11. | "He Needs Me" | 3:33 |
| 12. | "Swee'Pea's Lullaby" | 2:04 |
| 13. | "Din' We" | 3:05 |
| 14. | "It's Not Easy Being Me" | 2:18 |
| 15. | "Kids" | 4:27 |
| 16. | "Skeleton Cave" | 2:04 |
| 17. | "Now Listen Kid / To the Rescue / Mr. Eye Is Trapped / Back Into Action" | 5:04 |
| 18. | "Saved / Still at It / The Treasure / What? More Fighting / Pap's Boy / Olive & the Octopus / What's Up Pop / Popeye Triumphant" | 3:09 |
| 19. | "I'm Popeye the Sailor Man" | 1:22 |
| 20. | "End Title Medley" | 3:34 |

Disc 2

| No. | Title | Length |
|---|---|---|
| 1. | "Sweethaven" | 3:03 |
| 2. | "I'm Mean" | 3:21 |
| 3. | "Swee'Pea's Lullaby" | 2:50 |
| 4. | "Blow Me Down" | 3:02 |
| 5. | "Everything Is Food" | 3:43 |
| 6. | "He Needs Me" | 3:09 |
| 7. | "Everybody's Got to Eat" | 3:24 |
| 8. | "Sail with Me" | 2:53 |
| 9. | "I Yam What I Yam" | 3:08 |
| 10. | "It's Not Easy Being Me" | 2:24 |
| 11. | "Kids" | 3:52 |
| 12. | "I'm Popeye the Sailor Man" | 2:58 |
| 13. | "I'm Mean" | 2:59 |
| 14. | "He Needs Me" | 9:29 |
| 15. | "Everybody's Got to Eat" | 2:05 |
| 16. | "Din' We" | 3:02 |
| 17. | "Sailin'" | 4:52 |
| 18. | "I'd Rather Be Me" | 6:30 |
