= Poopdeck Pappy =

Fictional character from Popeye

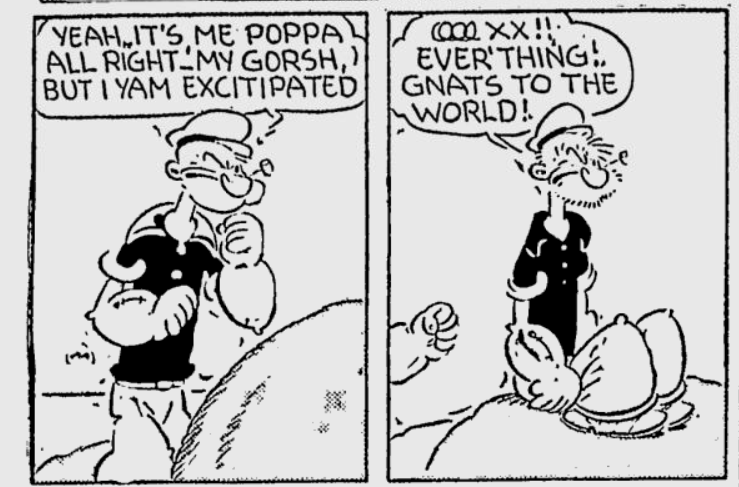
- The first appearance of Poopdeck Pappy from October 24, 1936

Publication information
- Publisher: King Features Syndicate
- First appearance: Thimble Theatre (1936)
- Created by: E. C. Segar
- Voiced by: Jack Mercer (1938–1984); Billy West (Popeye's Voyage: The Quest for Pappy)

In-story information
- Supporting character of: Popeye (son)

Poopdeck Pappy is a cartoon character featured in the Popeye (Thimble Theatre) comic strip and animated cartoon spinoffs. Created by E. C. Segar in 1936, the character is Popeye's father, who is depicted as age 85 in the comics, and 99 in animated media.

== History ==
Pappy first appeared in Thimble Theatre not long after Popeye acquired Eugene the Jeep in 1936. Popeye decided to use the creature's supernatural knowledge to find his father. An expedition which included Toar the caveman and Olive Oyl was set up to go to Barnacle Island. The ungrateful father answered Popeye's greeting with, "You look like something the cat dragged in... I don't like relatives." He came to Popeye's home anyway, followed by some mermaids with whom he had flirted.

Poopdeck Pappy made his first animated appearance in the Popeye the Sailor short Goonland (1938). In this cartoon, it is revealed that Popeye has a long-lost father, not seen since infancy, who is being held captive in the bizarre realm of Goon Island. When he goes to rescue the "ol' goat" in the Goon prison, his father refuses to acknowledge Popeye as his son, but when Popeye is himself captured by the Goons, Pappy eats Popeye's mislaid can of spinach to rescue his only child. In the mêlée that ensues, the filmstrip is supposedly broken and the projectionist must safety pin it back together to finish the cartoon.

Popeye is the spitting image of Poopdeck Pappy, though Pappy has a white beard. Pappy is far less principled than his son, stealing from Popeye's bank account and trying to sell water for $5,000 in Death Valley (to which Popeye, while pouring water for the parched traveler, tells Poopdeck, "I yam disgustipated wit' ya!"). There is no love lost between him and Olive Oyl, whom he calls a "lath-legged bean pole." (This stemmed from Poopdeck slugging Olive when they first met.) However, while he is grumpy and somewhat hostile, he is quite protective of Popeye, and does have a hidden soft side.

After Segar's death, Poopdeck's mother (called Granny who looks like her son and grandson, but wearing a bonnet) was introduced into the strip. She refuses to treat her son as an "eighty-five-year-old adult" (his age has been reduced from 99 to 85 in the comic strip) and often disciplines him after his raucous "nights on the town". She tends to be more amiable to Popeye, although she too believes that Olive needs a bit more meat on her bones. However, Olive agrees with how Granny keeps Pappy in the house, because when she does, the town is able to get a sound sleep. Granny is also notorious as being one of the worst cooks in the world.

In the Fleischer Studios shorts, Poopdeck Pappy and Popeye were both voiced by Jack Mercer.

== Appearances ==
- Goonland (1938)
- My Pop, My Pop (1940)
- Poopdeck Pappy (1940)
- Problem Pappy (1941)
- Quiet Pleeze (1941)
- Child Psykolojiky (1941)
- Pest Pilot (1941)
- Popeyes Pappy (1952)
- Ancient Fistory (1953)
- Baby Wants a Battle (1953)
- Me Quest for Poopdeck Pappy (1960)

In Robert Altman's Popeye, Poopdeck Pappy is played by Ray Walston. He is the "Commodore" of Sweethaven, but gets kidnapped by Captain Bluto and must be saved by Popeye. When Popeye sees his bulging arms, "squinky" eye and his pipe, he recognizes his long-lost father—though, as in their meeting on Goon Island, Pappy initially refuses to accept that Popeye is his son.

He also appears in Popeye and Son, in "Poopdeck Pappy and the Family Tree". While he comes to help his grandson Junior with his school report, traces of the classic Pappy come shining through when describing their ancestors in greater unsavory detail (much to Junior's initial dismay).

Pappy's history with Popeye has gradually been retconned in modern times. In the 2004 TV special Popeye's Voyage: The Quest for Pappy, when Popeye and his friends find him, he is initially hostile to his son as depicted in earlier tellings of their separation, but it is later revealed Pappy's did not maliciously abandon Popeye, but in fact sought to protect him from the wrath of the Sea Hag, who had a vendetta with Pappy, by putting as much distance between them as possible so she wouldn't find him. Thus, by acting furious at being found, he hopes to drive him away and keep him safe. And in Genndy Tartakovsky's abandoned Popeye feature film project, which was briefly leaked to the public in 2022 in animatic form, Popeye's father, who is seen only in flashback and never referred to as "Poopdeck Pappy," is again depicted putting his infant son in what he believes to be a safe place in order to protect him from the Sea Hag.
