= List of breakout characters =

Fictional characters who became more popular than their creators expected

A breakout character is a character in serial fiction, especially a member of an ensemble cast, who becomes much more prominent, popular, discussed, or imitated than expected by the creators. A breakout character may equal or overtake the other characters in popularity, including the protagonist. Prominent breakout characters will often make cameo appearances in expanded franchises or feature as main characters in spin-off installments of their own.

== Animation ==
| Character | Introduced in animated series | Year introduced | Notes |
|---|---|---|---|
| Porky Pig | Looney Tunes (1930–present); Merrie Melodies (1931–present) | 1935 | Porky Pig (first voiced by Joe Dougherty, shortly thereafter replaced by Mel Blanc) debuted as a supporting character in an ensemble cast of new characters that included, among others, Beans the Cat. Only a year later, it became clear that audiences were more interested in Beans' stuttering sidekick, Porky Pig. After Westward Whoa, Beans and the others were phased out and Porky replaced him as the star of Looney Tunes. Looney Tunes itself was designed to be a showcase of music from the music publishers' record companies that Warner Bros. owned. By 1935, the show was overhauled to accommodate Porky Pig after the character increased in prominence. Porky Pig's popularity was also instrumental in facilitating the success of Looney Tunes merchandise for the next several decades. |
| Bugs Bunny | Looney Tunes (1930–present); Merrie Melodies (1931–present) | 1938 | Bugs Bunny (first voiced by Mel Blanc) was originally envisioned as one of several potential foils for Porky Pig, alongside unsuccessful competitors including Gabby Goat and Petunia Pig. While Daffy Duck, who himself became a substantial star for Warner Bros., won that role, Bugs developed as a character in his own right by 1940 and became the biggest star in the Looney Tunes and Merrie Melodies shorts, developing his own cast of foils and starring in shorts for Warner Bros. until 1964. TV Guide identified Bugs as the greatest cartoon character in history in a 2002 listicle. |
| Woody Woodpecker | Woody Woodpecker (1940–present) | 1940 | Woody Woodpecker began as an unnamed minor character in Knock Knock, a short film featuring Andy Panda who was then Universal's star character. Audiences liked him immediately, so he became the star of his own cartoons. |
| Yogi Bear | The Huckleberry Hound Show (1958–1961) | 1958 | Yogi Bear (first voiced by Daws Butler) debuted in 1958 as a supporting character in one of three segments of The Huckleberry Hound Show. Yogi Bear's segment of the show became extremely popular and over time, overshadowed its titular character Huckleberry Hound in popularity. The first breakout character in animated television created by Hanna Barbera, Yogi Bear began starring in his own show by 1961, with Hokey Wolf taking his place on The Huckleberry Hound Show. |
| Bullwinkle J. Moose | Rocky and His Friends (1959–1964) | 1959 | Bullwinkle J. Moose (voiced by Bill Scott) on Rocky and His Friends. Although the series was originally named for Rocky the Flying Squirrel, Rocky's dim-witted sidekick Bullwinkle got most of the jokes while Rocky served as straight man. By 1961, the series had been renamed The Bullwinkle Show, a title that appears for the last three seasons of the series. |
| The California Raisins | Sun-Maid commercials | 1986 | The California Raisins (lead singer voiced by Buddy Miles) were the creation of claymation artist Will Vinton, as a work-for-hire for an advertising agency who had the California Raisin Advisory Board as its client. In light of focus group data that showed raisins were uncool, they purposely created the California Raisins as energetic soul musicians. The Raisins unexpectedly became major pop culture icons of the late 1980s, with an appearance in the television specials Will Vinton's Claymation Christmas Celebration and Meet the Raisins! along with a 13-episode traditionally animated Saturday morning cartoon, The California Raisin Show. The success of the campaign triggered a vicious cycle in which the profits from the campaign were fed back to the Board, who sent that money back to the advertising agency for more ads, leading to a member revolt and the collapse of the Board in 1994. |
| Harley Quinn | Batman: The Animated Series (1992–1995) | 1992 | Harley Quinn (first voiced by Arleen Sorkin). She first appeared in Batman: The Animated Series in the 1992 episode "Joker's Favor" in what was originally supposed to be the animated equivalent of a walk-on role. She eventually became popular enough to become one of the most common recurring villains in the series, start appearing in the comics, earn a starring role in the 2016 film Suicide Squad and even receive her own animated series in 2019. |
| Broly | Dragon Ball Z (1989–1996; films only) | 1993 | Broly is considered to be one of the most popular villains in the Dragon Ball series with a cult following, in spite of his origin as a non-canon character exclusive to the Dragon Ball animated film series as well as manga side stories. His popularity led to a rebooted canonical version of him starring in Dragon Ball Super: Broly. |
| Butters Stotch | South Park (1997–present) | 1997 | Butters Stotch (Matt Stone) on South Park. Originally a background character in the show's pilot, the character eventually emerged as a submissive foil or victim of Eric Cartman's, and gradually became one of the show's most prominent characters, sometimes as the protagonist whose schemes drive the plots of episodes, as in "Franchise Prequel", or the character whose closing soliloquy provides the philosophical insight or "moment of clarity" that serves as the episode's thematic resolution, as in "Raisins", "Cartman Sucks", and "Butterballs". |
| Stewie Griffin | Family Guy (1999–2003, 2005–present) | 1999 | Stewie Griffin (voiced by Seth MacFarlane) on Family Guy. Creator Seth MacFarlane stated that he was very surprised that Stewie turned out to be the show's breakout character, and that this required him to write stories centering on him. |
| Bender | Futurama (1999–2003, 2007–2013, 2023–present) | 1999 | Bender Bending Rodríguez (voiced by John DiMaggio) on Futurama. Bender is largely considered the show's breakout character with DiMaggio's vocal performance being credited with helping boost Futurama's longevity and loyal fan base. |
| Plankton | SpongeBob SquarePants (1999–present) | 1999 | Plankton (voiced by Mr. Lawrence) on SpongeBob SquarePants. Mr. Lawrence summarized Plankton's origins in 2015, saying that he "was only supposed to be in one or two episodes, but I was a writer on the show and I really liked this character". Following his first voice recording as Plankton, Lawrence drafted some of his own ideas for the character and passed them to Hillenburg. From then on, Plankton began to appear more often. Lawrence considers the third season the first in which Plankton is a main character. |
| Strong Bad | Homestar Runner (2000–present) | 2000 | Strong Bad (voiced by Matt Chapman) was originally conceived as the villain of Homestar Runner, a Web series that began mainly as experimental work by its creators The Brothers Chaps to learn how to create Flash animation. The establishment of a uniform style for the series in 2001, and the launch of a spin-off viewer mail segment Strong Bad Emails, helped round the character into a more comic persona and became a major driver of traffic to the Homestar Runner Web site. He was later one of the main characters in the game Poker Night. |
| GIR | Invader Zim (2001-2002, 2006) | 2001 | Gir is the robot companion of the titular protagonist of Invader Zim. Built from scraps of the more advanced robots by the Almighty Tallest due to their lack of faith in Zim, he poses as a dog in public to not draw attention from humans like Dib Membrane. GIR has been praised for his random non-sequiturs and cheerful persona. |

== Literature ==
| Character | Introduced in book | Year introduced | Notes |
|---|---|---|---|
| Sam Weller | The Pickwick Papers (1836) | 1836 | Sam Weller is considered to be the character that made Charles Dickens famous. The serialised episodes of The Pickwick Papers sold modestly until Weller's first appearance in the fourth episode, at which point sales exploded. The character's popularity overshadowed that of the title character Samuel Pickwick, inspiring merchandise and a dedicated stage play (Samuel Weller, or, The Pickwickians). The Paris Review stated, "arguably the most historic bump in English publishing is the Sam Weller Bump." |
| Ramona Quimby | Henry Huggins | 1950 | Ramona Quimby was introduced as a minor character, initially the two-year-old sister of elementary school student Beezus Quimby, who in turn was a friend of the titular character of Henry Huggins in the works of author Beverly Cleary. Ramona quickly became the focal point of Cleary's subsequent books, particularly with 1968's Ramona the Pest. By the time of the fourteenth and final book in the Quimby/Huggins fictional universe, 1999's Ramona's World, Ramona has aged to ten years old. |
| Severus Snape | Harry Potter and the Philosopher's Stone | 1997 | Severus Snape was introduced as a villain, and a relatively minor one compared with Lord Voldemort, but became so popular with readers that Borders' advertising campaign for the final book, Harry Potter and the Deathly Hallows, revolved around him. Fans could choose between two bumper stickers, “Trust Snape” and “Snape Is A Very Bad Man.” |

== Comic strips ==
| Character | Introduced in comic(s) | Year introduced | Notes |
|---|---|---|---|
| Krazy Kat | The Dingbat Family (1910–1916) | 1910 | Krazy Kat evolved from an earlier comic strip of series artist George Herriman's, The Dingbat Family, which started in 1910 and was later renamed The Family Upstairs. This comic chronicled the Dingbats' attempts to avoid the mischief of the mysterious unseen family living in the apartment above theirs and to unmask that family. Herriman would complete the cartoons about the Dingbats, and finding himself with time left over in his 8-hour work day, filled the bottom of the strip with slapstick drawings of the upstairs family's mouse preying upon the Dingbats' cat. This "basement strip" became a daily comic strip with a title (running vertically down the side of the page) in 1913 and a black and white full-page Sunday cartoon three years later. Due to the objections of editors, who considered it unsuitable for the comics sections, Krazy Kat originally appeared in the Hearst papers' art and drama sections. Hearst himself, however, enjoyed the strip so much that he gave Herriman a lifetime contract and guaranteed the cartoonist complete creative freedom. |
| Popeye | Thimble Theatre (1919–present) | 1929 | Popeye first appeared 10 years into the run of Thimble Theatre, a comic strip started in 1919 by E.C. "Elzie" Segar for the King Features Syndicate. During its first decade, the strip centered on the serialized escapades of ambitious, short-sighted entrepreneur Castor Oyl, his younger sister Olive Oyl and her boyfriend Ham Gravy. Segar introduced Popeye as a sailor hired by Castor and Ham to facilitate a single adventure. When the character disappeared from the strip afterwards, fans demanded his return, elevating him to a regular character by the end of 1929. As Popeye's prominence increased, Olive was recast as his girlfriend (facilitating Ham Gravy's disappearance in mid-1930), while Castor, initially retained as a lead character alongside Popeye, was relegated to tertiary status by the end of 1931, by which stage the strip's title was modified to Thimble Theater, Starring Popeye in response to the sailor's ascendent popularity. |
| Nancy | Fritzi Ritz (1922–1968) | 1933 | Nancy was introduced in 1933 in the comic strip Fritzi Ritz, which had debuted 11 years prior. Nancy soon emerged as a star in her own right, getting her own strip in 1938, while Fritzi Ritz's last strip would appear in 1968, becoming a supporting character in Nancy from then onward. |
| Snuffy Smith | Take Barney Google, F'rinstance (1919–present; now Barney Google and Snuffy Smith) | 1934 | Snuffy Smith was introduced as a supporting character in 1934 to Take Barney Google, F'rinstance. He became so popular that he took over the comic strip as the main character of what is now titled Barney Google and Snuffy Smith. Snuffy was the second breakout character for the strip, having come 12 years after Spark Plug, an ironically named racehorse who seldom raced, even less often finished above last place, and never won, was introduced and briefly prompted a rename to Barney Google and Spark Plug. |
| Nero | The Adventures of Nero (1947–2002) | 1947 | Nero from The Adventures of Nero by Marc Sleen was originally introduced as a side character in the series De Avonturen van Detective Van Zwam, where Detective Van Zwam was the main protagonist. From the first Van Zwam story on, Het Geheim van Matsuoka ("Matsuoka's Secret") (1947) readers reacted more enthusiastically to the dumb, lazy, vain and stubborn character Nero than the more noble and clever Van Zwam. So, from "De Hoed van Geeraard de Duivel" ("The Hat Of Gerard the Devil" (1950)) onward the series was named after Nero instead. |
| Snoopy | Peanuts (1950–2000) | 1950 | Snoopy was introduced near the beginning of the Peanuts run alongside original characters Charlie Brown, Patty and Shermy. He and Charlie Brown were the only characters to survive the entire strip, beginning to end. Over the first several years, he evolved into his best-known form as Charlie Brown's bipedal beagle who often imagined himself in any number of fantasies. The 1966 television special It's the Great Pumpkin, Charlie Brown, which features an extended sequence with Snoopy as a flying ace in a gunfight with the Red Baron, was one of the key works that transformed Snoopy from a supporting character into a breakout star. Jim Davis, a colleague of Peanuts creator Charles M. Schulz, noted that Snoopy was a far more popular and lucrative merchandising icon than Charlie Brown and, when Davis was conceiving his own strip, followed Schulz's blueprint of centering it around a domestic pet animal; Davis was unwilling to compete with Snoopy or the glut of dog comics and instead chose to center his own strip around a cat, Garfield. |
| Iznogoud | Les aventures du Calife Haroun el Poussah (1962–present) | 1962 | Iznogoud, the villainous Grand Vizier to the Caliph, started out as a secondary character to the Caliph in a French comic strip. Shortly afterward, he became the titular protagonist of the strip. |
| Monica | Monica and Friends (1959–present) | 1963 | Monica was originally introduced as a supporting character for Jimmy Five, based on Mauricio de Sousa's daughter, who created the character in an effort to diversify the core cast of his comic strips due to a lack of female characters. The character was initially introduced as a tomboyish girl who antagonized other characters (mainly Jimmy Five) with her super-strength, but she quickly became popular with the audience. Her popularity increased even further in the late 1960s when a comic strip making fun of a CICA food company commercial sparked the company's interest in hiring Mauricio de Sousa's characters for TV commercials. This eventually led to her becoming the star of her own solo comic book in 1970, even before Jimmy Five received his own title, and over time the franchise dropped the Jimmy Five name to be called Monica and Friends. |
| Opus the Penguin | Bloom County (1980–1989, 2015–present) | 1981 | Opus the Penguin, of Bloom County, Outland, and Opus, was originally featured in a two-week narrative in Bloom County in 1981. Fans requested more appearances of the penguin and series creator Berkeley Breathed was pleased with how well the character integrated with other characters in the strip. Opus was made a permanent character, displacing the original cast as the focus of the strip and its sequels. Another Berkeley Breathed creation, Bill the Cat, is also cited as a throwaway character which turned into a breakout success. |

== Comic books ==
=== Marvel Comics ===
| Character | Introduced in comic(s) | Year introduced | Notes |
|---|---|---|---|
| The Punisher | The Amazing Spider-Man (1963–present) | 1974 | The Punisher debuted as an antagonistic character in The Amazing Spider-Man #129 (February 1974). He was a hit with readers, and started to appear on a regular basis, teaming up with both Spider-Man and other heroes throughout the 1970s and 1980s. The Punisher's popularity took the character's creator, Gerry Conway by surprise, as he had intended him only as a second-tier character. The character evolved into an anti-hero and became one of Marvel's most popular characters in the 1990s, having a starring role in multiple comic book series, television series, films, and video games. His name, symbol, and image have been used for merchandise or appropriated for discussion of social issues. |
| Wolverine | The Incredible Hulk (1962–present) | 1974 | Wolverine is frequently cited as the first breakout character from the X-Men comics series, and "arguably the breakout character of the 1980s." He debuted in 1974's The Incredible Hulk #180 as a superhuman agent of the Canadian government who comes into conflict with the Hulk. He later appeared in 1975's Giant-Size X-Men #1, during writer Chris Claremont's first run with the X-Men, as one of several new recruits of the team. Wolverine was consistently the most popular member of the team; he headlined his first limited series in 1982, and later an ongoing solo series debuted in 1988, which eventually established Wolverine as one of Marvel's most important characters. |
| Elektra | Daredevil (1964–present) | 1981 | Elektra debuted as a supporting character in Daredevil #168 (January 1981) as a love interest of the superhero Daredevil, and quickly broke out in popularity. Frank Miller, who created Elektra, secured a promise from Marvel's editors to stop using Elektra after he had concluded her storyline. Marvel abided by this agreement until the mid-1990s, when later editors and ownership groups decided to revive the character against Miller's wishes. The character remains one of Marvel's most popular female characters, with a starring role in two eponymous ongoing series, several mini-series, an eponymous live action film in 2005, as well as a major role in the 2003 film Daredevil and Marvel's Netflix television series. |
| Venom | The Amazing Spider-Man (1963–present) | 1984 | Venom was originally introduced as a living alien costume in The Amazing Spider-Man #252 (May 1984). The creature made its full first appearance with Eddie Brock as its host in The Amazing Spider-Man #300 (May 1988). Venom's popularity in the late 1980s and early 1990s inspired a series of symbiote characters published by Marvel comics, and the character eventually transitioned from a villain to an anti-hero, appearing as a principal character in a number of comic book series. The character has also appeared in numerous other media, including an eponymous live action film series. |
| Deadpool | The New Mutants (1982–present) | 1991 | Deadpool debuted as a villain in The New Mutants #98 (February 1991), and subsequently made guest appearances in issues of X-Force. The character's popularity led to the publication of his first solo comic, the four-issue limited series Deadpool: The Circle Chase on August 10, 1993. He is notable as one of the few breakout comic characters in the 1990s and 2000s, having a starring role in multiple comic series, a 2013 video game, and three live-action eponymous films in 2016, 2018, and 2024. |
| Hit-Girl | Kick-Ass: The Dave Lizewski Years (2008–2014) | 2008 | Hit-Girl is a breakout character from the Kick-Ass: The Dave Lizewski Years who went on to have her own comic book series. |
| Spider-Gwen | Edge of Spider-Verse (2014–2015) | 2014 | An alternative universe version of Gwen Stacy, commonly referred to as Spider-Gwen, first appears in Edge of Spider-Verse #2 (September 2014) as part of the 2014–15 "Spider-Verse" comic book storyline, which features multiple alternative versions of Spider-Man that had appeared in various media. The character subsequently became one of comics' biggest breakout characters in recent years; the character is the lead heroine in her own ongoing comic book series, numerous animated television and video game appearances, as well as a co-starring role in the Academy Award-winning Spider-Man: Into the Spider-Verse. The character also inspired the creation of twenty Marvel variant covers of Gwen Stacy reimagined as a wide array of Marvel heroes in June 2015, spawning popular hybrid variants such as Gwenpool, a variant of Deadpool. |
| Doctor Aphra | Star Wars: Darth Vader (2015–2016, 2016; 2017–2018; 2020–present) | 2015 | Doctor Aphra debuted as a supporting character in the 2015 Marvel Comics series Star Wars: Darth Vader, her popularity as a breakout character leading to crossovers in other comics, and then her own series, Doctor Aphra. Aphra is the first original Star Wars character not from the films to lead a Marvel comic series. |

=== Other ===
| Character | Introduced in comic(s) | Year introduced | Notes |
|---|---|---|---|
| Scrooge McDuck | Four Color Comics (1939–1962) | 1947 | Scrooge McDuck was originally intended as a one-off antagonistic supporting character in Christmas on Bear Mountain, a 1947 Donald Duck story by Carl Barks, first published in Four Color Comics #178. Scrooge McDuck's popularity grew so large that he spawned an entire mythology around the character, including new supporting characters, adventures, and life experiences as told by numerous authors. In 1952 he was given his own comic book series, Uncle Scrooge, which is still ongoing today. Several stories written by Barks and published in Uncle Scrooge were adapted as episodes of the popular syndicated television cartoon DuckTales in the late 1980s. |
| The Smurfs | Johan and Peewit (1952–2001) | 1958 | The Smurfs were originally supporting characters in Peyo's comic series Johan and Peewit in 1958. The popularity of the little blue men led to them getting their own series a year later, which was subsequently followed by massive merchandising, a television series and various other productions. |
| Sabrina the Teenage Witch | Archie's Madhouse (1959–1982) | 1962 | Sabrina the Teenage Witch was originally introduced as a one-off character in the Archie Comics universe in 1969. Unbeknownst to the original creators, Filmation was interested in the character and created a Saturday morning cartoon featuring Sabrina, helping the character become one of the most popular in the Archie Comics universe. Sabrina would get a second boost of popularity in the late 1990s with a prime time live-action Sabrina the Teenage Witch series, which starred Melissa Joan Hart in the title role. |
| John Constantine | The Saga of Swamp Thing (1982–1999) | 1985 | John Constantine debuted as a supporting character who played a pivotal role in the "American Gothic" Swamp Thing storyline in 1985. Constantine was an instant breakout character, and received his own ongoing solo comic series in 1988. The Hellblazer series was the longest-running and most successful title of DC's Vertigo imprint. The character was adapted for a live-action film, a television show, novels, and multiple spin-offs and crossovers. |
| Vegeta | Dragon Ball (1984–present) | 1988 | Vegeta debuted as a villain in Dragon Ball chapter #204 Sayonara, Son Goku (さようなら孫悟空, Sayōnara Son Gokū), in Weekly Shōnen Jump magazine on November 7, 1988. Vegeta's popularity among fans in Japan led to Dragon Ball's author, Akira Toriyama, to forgo his initial plan for Vegeta as a short lived villain. Toriyama included him more in the story, and Vegeta became one of Dragon Ball's most prominent characters. |
| Death (DC Comics) | The Sandman (1989–present) | 1989 | Death (DC Comics) debuted in 1989 as a supporting character in Neil Gaiman's The Sandman. She is considered the breakout character of the entire Sandman series by multiple sources. |

== Film ==
| Characters | Introduced in film or film series | Year introduced | Notes |
|---|---|---|---|
| Inspector Jacques Clouseau | The Pink Panther (1963–present) | 1963 | Inspector Jacques Clouseau, Peter Sellers' character in the Pink Panther film series, was originally conceived as a supporting character to David Niven's gentleman burglar Sir Charles Lytton in the film that launched the franchise, but quickly became the protagonist. |
| Dr. Frank-N-Furter | Rocky Horror Picture Show (1973–2016) | 1973 | Dr. Frank-N-Furter was just the main antagonist of an ensemble cast but became a queer icon due to Tim Curry's performance, which propelled Curry's career to international stardom and remains the role most associated his legacy. |
| Boba Fett | Star Wars (1977–present) | 1978 | Boba Fett was introduced in the 1978 Star Wars Holiday Special, before appearing in supporting roles in The Empire Strikes Back and Return of the Jedi. Though his screen time in the original Star Wars trilogy was minimal, and he apparently died an ignominious death in the third film, his visual design made him an iconic mainstay of the franchise. In the original Star Wars Expanded Universe, more commonly referred to as Star Wars: Legends, his character was established to have survived in the 1991 comics series Dark Empire. He also became a recurring character in Star Wars video games, including Bounty Hunter and the Battlefront series. His backstory would be provided in the 1999 – 2005 prequel trilogy, which gave rise to other Mandalorian characters, including Din Djarin in the television series The Mandalorian. Fett himself reappeared in that series, making his survival from the events of Jedi canonical. |
| Slimer | Ghostbusters (1984–present) | 1984 | Slimer was introduced in the original Ghostbusters film as a one-scene character, a gluttonous ghost whom the titular Ghostbusters capture and was implied to be the ghost of John Belushi. Slimer proved such a hit that he became a mascot for the franchise. The first animated series adaptation, The Real Ghostbusters, was eventually retooled to focus on Slimer, who also received a long-running product-tie in from Hi-C, Ecto Cooler. |
| Hannibal Lecter | Manhunter (1986) | 1986 | Hannibal Lecter was introduced as a secondary character in Manhunter, and as a supporting character in The Silence of the Lambs. He became later an important character in popular culture, having two sequels centered on his character: Hannibal and Hannibal Rising. |
| Scrat | Ice Age (2002–present) | 2002 | Scrat (voiced by Chris Wedge) was conceived midway through the film's production under Blue Sky Studios, although information regarding the conception and creation process of the character has been inconsistent. He was originally intended to be killed off in the introductory scene of the 2002 film Ice Age but was kept alive and added to more scenes after positive reviews from audiences for the character in a teaser trailer released by 20th Century Studios. Since then, he had gone on to appear in multiple other Ice Age sequels and starred in his own shorts for the franchise. He is well-recognized for his popularity and was also later officially the mascot of Blue Sky Studios up until its closure. |
| Puss in Boots | Shrek (2001–present) | 2004 | Puss in Boots (voiced by Antonio Banderas), based on the fairy tale character of the same name, first appeared in the 2004 film Shrek 2. The character's popularity would go on to spawn two spin-off films, Puss in Boots (2011) and The Last Wish (2022), alongside the animated series The Adventures of Puss in Boots (2015-2018). |
| Tow Mater | Cars (2006–present) | 2006 | Tow Mater (voiced by Larry the Cable Guy) debuted in Cars (2006), the first animated film in the Disney/Pixar Cars franchise as a supporting character and best friend to series protagonist Lightning McQueen. Being the breakout character of the film, he was given a prominent role in the Cars franchise. His lead role in Cars 2 was criticised by critics for stealing the spotlight from Lightning McQueen, while his character was likened to the Star Wars character Jar Jar Binks. |
| Aldous Snow | Forgetting Sarah Marshall (2008) | 2008 | Aldous Snow, Russell Brand's character in Forgetting Sarah Marshall. He later appears in a starring role in the 2010 spin-off sequel Get Him to the Greek. |
| Phil Coulson | Marvel Cinematic Universe (2008–present) | 2008 | Phil Coulson, portrayed by Clark Gregg in the Marvel Cinematic Universe, initially had a minor part in Iron Man (2008). This led to further recurring appearances in Iron Man 2 (2010), Thor (2011), and two Marvel One-Shots (2011), and The Avengers (2012) in which Coulson is murdered. The character is then revealed to be alive in the pilot episode of Agents of S.H.I.E.L.D., in which he was the main character. Other appearances included that series' digital spinoff, various tie-in comics, animated series, and Captain Marvel (2019). |
| The Minions | Despicable Me (2010–present) | 2010 | The Minions became breakout characters in the 2010 animated film Despicable Me. They eventually starred in a 2015 spinoff, Minions. |
| Olaf | Frozen (2013-present) | 2013 | Olaf was introduced in the original Frozen film as a supporting character. Despite almost being cut from the film entirely by co-director Jennifer Lee during development, she was persuaded to keep him in the film once Josh Gad was lined up to voice the character. |
| Yondu Udonta | Marvel Cinematic Universe (2008–present) | 2014 | Yondu Udonta, portrayed by Michael Rooker in the Marvel Cinematic Universe films Guardians of the Galaxy and Guardians of the Galaxy Vol. 2, was originally written as a supporting ally of the titular superhero team. Following the positive reception for the character in the first film, his role was upgraded significantly for the second, where he was considered by many critics to give a show-stealing performance. |

== Radio ==
| Characters | Introduced on radio program or series | Year introduced | Notes |
|---|---|---|---|
| The Shadow | Detective Story Hour (1930–1931) | 1931 | The Shadow was originally introduced as the narrator of Detective Story Hour, a radio drama with its stories taken from the Street & Smith pulp magazine Detective Story. Within a year of the show's launch, The Shadow—who was originally intended to be a straight announcer with no direct involvement in the stories—had become so much more popular than the magazine and radio show themselves that the radio concept was reworked so that The Shadow himself would be injected into the storylines. For the radio series, this required The Shadow to be imbued with supernatural powers to be able to hide in plain sight from criminals and maintain omniscience. The Shadow received a full spin-off radio show under that name in 1937, which ran until 1954, while Street & Smith would create a spin-off pulp magazine starring The Shadow that would run until 1949. |
| Throckmorton Philharmonic Gildersleeve | Fibber McGee & Molly (1935–1959) | 1939 | Throckmorton Philharmonic Gildersleeve (as portrayed by Harold Peary, later replaced by Willard Waterman in 1950) was an antagonist on the long-running radio comedy Fibber McGee & Molly around 1939. The pompous underwear salesman proved popular enough to warrant a spin-off, The Great Gildersleeve, in 1941. Like its parent show, Gildersleeve would go on to a long run in radio, film and (briefly) television; the last episode of Gildersleeve aired in 1958. |

== Television ==
| Characters | Introduced in TV show | Year introduced | Notes |
|---|---|---|---|
| Dagmar | Broadway Open House (1950–1951) | 1950 | Dagmar (Virginia "Jennie" Lewis) was a character created for Broadway Open House, American television's first late-night variety show. The show had faced a challenge in that a daily television variety show had never been attempted before and would require an unprecedented amount of new material, produced quickly, which soon exhausted all of host Jerry Lester's repertoire. The solution was to bring in Lewis, who was given no script and an instruction to improvise as a dumb blonde named Dagmar, who would serve as Lester's foil. The character became a national sensation, briefly carrying on after Lester finally left the show after a year, appearing on a cover story for Life magazine, and recording a duet with Frank Sinatra in character, "Mama Will Bark." |
| Maynard G. Krebs | The Many Loves of Dobie Gillis (1959–1963) | 1959 | Maynard G. Krebs (Bob Denver) on The Many Loves of Dobie Gillis, was originally created as a supporting character, the beatnik best friend of the titular character Dobie Gillis, when the series began in 1959. By 1960, Denver had graduated to co-lead and Maynard was given the bulk of the comedy material, with Dwayne Hickman's Dobie as the straight man. Dobie Gillis was Denver's first professional acting job, and the breakout success of the Maynard character led to Denver starring on Gilligan's Island after Dobie ended in 1963. Krebs was famously parodied as Shaggy Rogers (voiced by Casey Kasem) in the long-running Scooby-Doo franchise; Shaggy was largely an updated hippie reimagining of Krebs. |
| Spock | Star Trek (1966–1969) | 1966 | Spock (Leonard Nimoy) on Star Trek was the only character to be carried over from the original pilot to the second. Series creator Gene Roddenberry was pressured by NBC to drop the character from the second pilot, then later to keep the character in the background. Spock's popularity grew, and NBC soon reversed its stance, encouraging more focus on the character. Spock appeared in every episode of the original series, the animated series and the original cast films. |
| Gladys Ormphby | Rowan & Martin's Laugh-In (1968-1973) | 1968 | Gladys Ormphby (Ruth Buzzi) was a recurring character in sketches on Laugh-In. Despite largely being a one-joke character, that of a comically dour and frumpy woman who used her handbag to fend off the lecherous Tyrone F. Horneigh (Arte Johnson), Gladys became Buzzi's signature character, often appearing on other series (sometimes unnamed), and Buzzi often recalled that celebrities would ask her to hit them with Gladys's purse. |
| Polkaroo | Polka Dot Door (1971-1993) | 1971 | Initially, the Polkaroo only appeared on Thursdays on Imagination Day, normally being played in costume by the male host. Over time, the character became so popular with fans, that he made additional appearances later on in the series and in the two one hour specials. After Polka Dot Door ended, TVOntario capitalized on his success by making him be the main protagonist of Polka Dot Shorts. He also made appearances in Gisèle's Big Backyard |
| Super Dave Osborne | The John Byner Comedy Hour | 1972 (breakout c. 1980) | Super Dave Osborne was created, written and performed by veteran variety show writer Bob Einstein as a character for John Byner's eponymous comedy hour, but would become a permanent feature of Byner's next variety show, Bizarre, where the show—based in Canada and syndicated to premium cable in the United States, allowing for more adult language than other variety shows of the day—made Osborne, a perpetually failing stuntman, a household name. After Byner ended Bizarre, the show's producers retained Einstein's services for four more years with the show Super Dave, which was followed by the animated series Super Dave: Daredevil for Hire, which required a severe toning-down of the character's language and ethnic stereotypes. |
| Thelma "Mama" Harper | The Carol Burnett Show (1967–1977) | 1974 | Thelma "Mama" Harper (Vicki Lawrence) originated in a recurring sketch on The Carol Burnett Show, The Family, as a cantankerous elderly matriarch constantly bickering with her daughter Eunice (Carol Burnett, who in real life is older than Lawrence). Mama and Eunice would go on to appear in the television film Eunice, after which Lawrence starred for several years in a standalone sitcom centered around the character, Mama's Family, which became a major hit in first-run syndication. Lawrence continues to use the Mama character in live stage appearances. |
| J.J. Evans | Good Times (1974–1979) | 1974 | J.J. Evans (Jimmie Walker) on Good Times, with his catchphrase "Dy-no-mite!", came to dominate the family series, leading to friction with stars Esther Rolle and John Amos, who played his parents. Amos and Rolle's concern was not so much that they resented being upstaged, but rather that they felt the J.J. character was too stereotypical and not a good role model for young African American viewers. A showdown with the show's producers in 1976 led to modification of the character, Amos' character being killed off and a temporary departure by Rolle from the show. Rolle returned at the beginning of the show's final season in 1978–79, and J.J. became an even stronger focus of the show. |
| Fonzie | Happy Days (1974–1984) | 1974 | Fonzie (Henry Winkler) on the American sitcom Happy Days began in a supporting role, but quickly evolved into the focal point of the series. His character became the best friend to the main character, Richie Cunningham, displacing Potsie Weber. Winkler's billing in the credits rose to second (he refused to be billed above Ron Howard) and then first after Howard left the show to pursue directing. At one point, network executives hoped to retitle the show Fonzie's Happy Days. |
| K-9 | Doctor Who (1963–1989, 2005–present) | 1977 | K-9 (John Leeson and David Brierly) on Doctor Who, was a robotic dog who served as the Doctor's companion from 1977 to 1980. Following the character's departure, he appeared in the pilot for the aborted spin-off series K-9 and Company. He later appeared in three episodes of the revived series of Doctor Who, made appearances on the spin-off series The Sarah Jane Adventures, and was the central character in the spin-off series K-9. |
| J. R. Ewing | Dallas (1978–1991, 2012–2014) | 1978 | J. R. Ewing (Larry Hagman) on Dallas. The initial concept of Dallas was a Romeo and Juliet-esque tale, focusing on two star-crossed lovers whose families are sworn enemies, with the amoral brother J.R. serving as a supporting character. However, the popularity of both the character and Hagman grew, and the producers acknowledged his new status as the series' breakout character. Two highly rated 1980 episodes became pop culture zeniths. In "A House Divided" and "Who Done It?", the audience witnessed J.R. being shot by an unknown assailant. After the cliffhanger was broadcast in March 1980, the audience was forced to wait until the October premiere of the next season for the cliffhanger's resolution. The intervening hiatus gave rise to the "Who shot J.R.?" phenomenon. Riding the crest of his newfound popularity, Larry Hagman threatened to leave the series unless his contractual demands were met. CBS leaked rumors of recasting, but Hagman eventually prevailed. As the series progressed, J.R. emerged as the central character until the show's cancellation in 1991, with Hagman serving as executive producer for the final few seasons. Hagman would go on to reprise the character in two television films and a revival series until his death in 2012. |
| Bob and Doug McKenzie | SCTV (1976–1984) | 1980 | Bob and Doug McKenzie (portrayed by Rick Moranis and Dave Thomas respectively) were created as Canadian content filler for SCTV, appearing as hosts of the show-within-a-show "The Great White North" and improvising as two drunken stereotypical Canadians. The duo were spun off into the film Strange Brew, an album also titled The Great White North, and several appearances in other films and television shows. Their success also led to Moranis and Thomas being forced out of the SCTV cast in 1982 due to the other cast members becoming resentful of the duo's success. Particularly John Candy, who accused Thomas of using his head writer position to squash other characters and sketches in favor of more Bob and Doug. |
| Reverend I. M. Jolly | Scotch and Wry (1978–1992) | 1978 | Reverend I. M. Jolly was originally one of a series of ministers who hosted the final sketch, Last Call, on episodes of Rikki Fulton's Scotch and Wry. Jolly, the perpetually dour and ironically named minister, came to be the regular host of the segment, continuing as a Hogmanay feature for several years after Scotch and Wry ended. Gregor Fisher took over the role in 2019 for a one-off fortieth anniversary special but later expressed regret for doing so. |
| Ernest P. Worrell | Commercials for Carden & Cherry | 1980 | Ernest P. Worrell (Jim Varney) originated as a character that advertising agency Carden & Cherry would license out to advertisers to pitch numerous products. While Ernest, an eager yet dimitted working-class yokel, was not the only such character the agency offered (others included Gailard Sartain and Bill Byrge's "Chuck and Bobby" and Varney's own Auntie Nelda), Ernest became by far the most popular. When demand for Ernest commercials began to overwhelm the agency and exclusivity agreements limited the character's national reach, the agency began a series of feature films starring Varney as Ernest (with many of the other characters as supporting roles) and the short-lived Saturday morning series Hey Vern. It's Ernest! |
| Elmo | Sesame Street (1969–present) | 1980 | Elmo joined the cast of the children's show Sesame Street in the late 1970s. Originally a supporting character, Elmo's popularity among the show's younger fans rose when, after years of being rotated around multiple puppeteers and having various different voices and personalities, Kevin Clash took over the puppet in 1985. Clash developed Elmo's voice and childlike personality, which became a major success and led to him receiving his own segment within the show, "Elmo's World", and becoming a major marketing icon. Clash relinquished the puppet in 2012 and Ryan Dillon has portrayed him since. |
| Alex P. Keaton | Family Ties (1982–1989) | 1982 | Alex P. Keaton (Michael J. Fox) on Family Ties. |
| Dr. Frasier Crane | Cheers (1982–1993) | 1984 | Dr. Frasier Crane (Kelsey Grammer) from Cheers debuted in the third season (1984–85) as a temporary release for some of the relationship tension between Sam and Diane, and was only meant to make guest appearances in a few episodes. He would instead remain as a recurring character, providing an upper-class foil to the otherwise working-class cast. He became a series regular by the show's fifth season. By 1993, the character would go on to headline Frasier, created as a spin-off from Cheers after its end. |
| Sandra Clark | 227 (1985–1990) | 1985 | Sandra Clark (Jackée Harry) on 227. The series was originally intended as a vehicle for Marla Gibbs. Harry's character, however, proved to be a breakout success. |
| Sophia Petrillo | The Golden Girls (1985–1992) | 1985 | Sophia Petrillo (Estelle Getty) on The Golden Girls, was the mother of lead character Dorothy Zbornak (Beatrice Arthur), and was originally written as a one-off character for the pilot. However, her blunt wisecracking became a signature of the show, to the point where she became a core member of the cast, replacing a gay chef named "Coco" who only appeared in the pilot. Petrillo would go on to appear in The Golden Palace and Empty Nest, with the character ending its run at the end of Empty Nest in 1995. |
| Joe Isuzu | Isuzu commercials | 1986 | Joe Isuzu (David Leisure) was introduced in an effort from Japanese automaker Isuzu to make inroads in the American markets after several years of obscurity. Joe Isuzu, who began as a salesman who absurdly exaggerated the performance of the cars he was selling, was not only the most successful campaign Isuzu would run during its decade-long run in the United States market, but served as Leisure's breakout role, with the then-struggling actor parlaying his fame into a co-starring role on Empty Nest for several years and Leisure returning to the Joe Isuzu character several times after Isuzu discontinued it in 1991. |
| Worf | Star Trek: The Next Generation (1987–1994) | 1987 | Worf (Michael Dorn) on Star Trek: The Next Generation was not meant to be anything but a background character. However, he became so popular that he became a main character, with entire episodes focused on him. He became a series regular on Star Trek: Deep Space Nine as soon as TNG went off the air. There were even plans to give him his own television show. |
| Steve Urkel | Family Matters (1989–1998) | 1989 | Steve Urkel (Jaleel White) on Family Matters was originally a one-shot character during the show's first season in 1989. He became so popular that he became a regular cast member from season two forward, practically synonymous with the series. |
| Todd Manning | One Life to Live (1963–2011, 2013) | 1992 | Todd Manning (originally and currently Roger Howarth, was played at one time by Trevor St. John) on One Life to Live, known for initiating the gang rape of Marty Saybrooke in 1993, was originally supposed to have a short-lived recurrence. However, once Howarth was seen to attract positive viewer reaction, the character was given a more primary focus. The character's popularity continued even after St. John assumed the role in 2003. (Note: St. John's version of the character was eventually rewritten as Todd's twin brother, Victor. Howarth returned as Todd in 2011.) |
| Tommy Oliver | Power Rangers (1993–present) | 1993 | Tommy Oliver (Jason David Frank) from the live-action television franchise Power Rangers franchise was only intended to appear for one season. He became so popular that in subsequent seasons, he was made a series regular. He eventually became the most enduring character in the franchise. |
| Mr Blobby | Noel's House Party (1991–1999) | 1993 | Mr Blobby (portrayed by Barry Killerby) on Noel's House Party became a British national phenomenon upon his debut in 1993; he quickly became a source of ridicule and national embarrassment as time progressed. |
| Robert Barone | Everybody Loves Raymond (1996–2005) | 1996 | Robert Barone (Brad Garrett) on Everybody Loves Raymond was credited with being the show's "secret weapon" and the main catalyst for most of the show's "comic high points." |
| Spike | Buffy the Vampire Slayer (1997–2003) | 1997 | Spike (James Marsters) on Buffy the Vampire Slayer was originally intended to be a villain for a few episodes. However, the character became a recurring one through the end of the second season, and then a main character in the fourth season. He appeared regularly through the end of the series, then appeared as a main character during the final season of Angel. |
| Chloe O'Brian | 24 (2001–2010) | 2003 | Chloe O'Brian (Mary Lynn Rajskub) on 24. Rajskub's character was introduced during the third season of the series. She initially appeared as a recurring character throughout seasons three and four, before being promoted to a series regular in season five. She continued in that role until season eight, as well as reprising her role in 24: Live Another Day. By season six, Rajskub had become the second-billed cast member after lead actor Kiefer Sutherland and has second most appearances of any character after Jack Bauer. During her tenure on the series, Chloe becomes one of Jack's closest friends and allies and is considered a "fan-favorite". She has been included in AOL's list of the "100 Most Memorable Female TV Characters". |
| Carson Beckett | Stargate Atlantis (2004–2009) | 2004 | Carson Beckett, portrayed by Paul McGillion on Stargate Atlantis, was introduced in the pilot episode, originally intended to be an occasional guest star for scenes requiring a doctor. His character was an immediate hit with the fans from inception, and Beckett earned his own episode halfway through Season 1. He was upgraded to a regular in Season 2, becoming one of the six main characters and appearing in 15 episodes of the season. Despite his popularity, however, the character was killed off at the end of Season 3. This led to outrage among his fans, who campaigned so heavily for his return that the character was written back into the series a year later. He became a recurring character once again during the show's fourth and fifth seasons. |
| Barney Stinson | How I Met Your Mother (2005–2014) | 2005 | Barney Stinson (Neil Patrick Harris) on How I Met Your Mother. Over time, Stinson became a scene-stealer and has been credited for much of the show's success. |
| London Tipton | The Suite Life of Zack & Cody (2005–2008) | 2005 | London Tipton (Brenda Song) on The Suite Life of Zack & Cody and its spin-off The Suite Life on Deck. |
| Kenneth Parcell | 30 Rock (2006–2013) | 2006 | Kenneth Parcell (Jack McBrayer) on 30 Rock. Originally a peripheral character in the first season, the eternally cheerful NBC Page moved into the main cast beginning in season two, and McBrayer received an Emmy nomination for Outstanding Supporting Actor in a Comedy Series in 2009. |
| Andy Bernard | The Office (2005–2013) | 2006 | Andy Bernard (Ed Helms) on The Office was originally signed to appear in 10 episodes during the show's third season. Realizing that Helms had similarities with the character they were creating, the producers gradually merged the two. Bernard became a series regular when the Stamford and Scranton branches were merged in the show's storyline. In the eighth season, Andy replaced Michael Scott as the regional manager of the branch when Steve Carell left the show. |
| Benjamin Linus | Lost (2004–2010) | 2006 | Benjamin Linus (Michael Emerson) in Lost was originally only supposed to be in three episodes of Season 2 in the fake persona of "Henry Gale", but the producers enjoyed the actor's performance so much that they wrote him in as the leader of the Others. He became a series regular in Season 3 and remained a star character for the rest of the show. During the series' run, Linus was often hailed as one of the best villains on television, and Emerson was nominated for three Emmys, winning one for Outstanding Supporting Actor in a Drama Series. |
| Sheldon Cooper | The Big Bang Theory (2007–2019) | 2007 | Sheldon Cooper (Jim Parsons) on The Big Bang Theory (2007–2019) and (Iain Armitage) on Young Sheldon (2017–2024). In a June 2022 column TV Guide writer Matt Roush, responding to a question regarding whether other characters from The Big Bang Theory would receive their own spinoffs, stated that Sheldon was given one because he was the star's "breakout character" and the main protagonist of the series, but that spinoffs for other characters were not likely. |
| Castiel | Supernatural (2005–2020) | 2008 | Castiel (Misha Collins) on Supernatural is noted for originally being conceived for a short six-episode story arc at the beginning of the show's fourth season. By the time the fourth season came to a close, not only had the character quickly become a favorite amongst fans, but he was subsequently upgraded from his previous supporting status to a series star alongside the show's main protagonists Sam Winchester and Dean Winchester from the show's fifth season onward. |
| Saul Goodman | Breaking Bad (2008–2013) | 2009 | Saul Goodman (Bob Odenkirk) was originally conceived as a joke character for three episodes of Breaking Bad's second season, but after seeing his performance and contribution to the show's dynamic, showrunner Vince Gilligan decided to promote him to series regular for the remaining seasons. The character would later star as the lead character for the spin-off series Better Call Saul. |
| Ron Swanson | Parks and Recreation (2009–2015) | 2009 | Ron Swanson (Nick Offerman) on Parks and Recreation. Originally a background character, he soon became what critics called the show's "secret weapon", and a scene-stealer, noted for his frequent deadpan comedy and machismo. |
| Abed Nadir | Community (2009–2015) | 2009 | Abed Nadir (Danny Pudi) on Community. Originally a supporting character became universally praised for his meta humour and look on pop culture and movies. His relationship with Troy Barnes has been praised as one of TV’s best friendships. Pudi’s portrayal has been praised as a scene stealer. |
| Daryl Dixon | The Walking Dead (2010–2022) | 2010 | Daryl Dixon (Norman Reedus) on The Walking Dead. An original character created for the television series, who did not originate in the comics source material. His popularity grew to such an extent that he has been featured in two video games (The Walking Dead: Survival Instinct and The Walking Dead: Onslaught) and in 2023 he starred in a spin-off show. His popularity grew to the point that fans questioned whether he would be adapted into the comics series, though creator Robert Kirkman indicated that he had no plans do so, as he preferred the idea of certain characters maintaining their unique relationship to specific mediums. |
| Elka Ostrovsky | Hot in Cleveland (2010–2015) | 2010 | Elka Ostrovsky was portrayed (by Betty White) on Hot in Cleveland. White was originally offered a guest role in the pilot episode, but her popularity prompted the producers to give her a permanent lead role. |
| Elijah Mikaelson | The Vampire Diaries (2009–2017) | 2010 | Elijah Mikaelson (Daniel Gillies) on The Vampire Diaries and The Originals, was originally brought in as a minor threat for the main characters and as a way to introduce villain Klaus. He was then supposed to die after six episodes. However, the character became so immensely popular that the writers changed his storyline, revealing him to be Klaus' brother. He became an important ally to the main characters and continued to recur on the show. Gillies then brought the character over to the spin-off The Originals, where Elijah has become one of the main characters. |
| Schmidt | New Girl (2011–2018) | 2011 | Schmidt (Max Greenfield) on New Girl (2011–2018). |
| Felicity Smoak | Arrow (2012–2020) | 2012 | Felicity Smoak (Emily Bett Rickards) on Arrow was introduced as an IT consultant at Oliver Queen's company midway through the first season. She quickly became a fan favorite and was made a series regular from the second season, with DC comics re-imagining her comics counterpart for The New 52 as a facsimile of the live-action version. Rickards departed from the role at the end of season seven, but returned as a guest star in the series finale in season eight. The character also made appearances in spin-off shows The Flash, Legends of Tomorrow and web series Vixen, as well as Supergirl, and featured in comics and novels published to accompany the series. |
| Sara Lance | Arrow (2012–2020) | 2012 | Sara Lance (Caity Lotz) in Arrow and Legends of Tomorrow is an original character and the sister of Laurel Lance. Originally thought to have died in events prior to the show's first episode, Sara showed up in Star City alive in season 2, having assumed the vigilante identity Canary. She joins Team Arrow for a while, until she is killed off in the season 3 premiere, thus paving way for Laurel to assume her identity and become the Black Canary. By this time, Sara had proven to be very popular with fans and critics, and her death led to outrage amongst the fans, especially when her mantle as the Canary was given to Laurel. Sara was eventually brought back to life in season 4, and ultimately went on to star as one of the leads in the Arrow spin-off Legends of Tomorrow. |
| Mellie Grant | Scandal (2012–2018) | 2012 | Mellie Grant portrayed by Bellamy Young on Scandal. Originally a recurring character meant to appear in only three episodes of the first season, the role of Mellie ended up appearing in every episode. She became a main cast member by the second season, and by the third season was described by many as the breakout character of the show. As of the seventh and final season, she has risen from being merely the First Lady, then a U.S. Senator representing Virginia, to President of the United States, succeeding her husband. Praised from the start as a villainous scene stealer, Mellie eventually became much more developed and eventually integral to show. Young received major acclaim for her performance, with one critic going so far as to say, "In Mellie, the show has its most fleshed-out character and in Young, its most compelling performer." |
| Wheeler Walker, Jr. | The Ben Show (2013) | 2013 | Wheeler Walker Jr., a comically vulgar country singer, was the creation of comedian Ben Hoffman and originally debuted as a one-off fictional persona for an episode of his short-lived mockumentary series The Ben Show. In 2016, Hoffman resurrected the character and recorded an independent record in character as Walker. The record became an underground success, prompting subsequent Walker albums; Hoffman has appeared as Walker alongside real-life alternative country and country rock artists and has used the Walker character to defend traditional country music, including a protest against an exhibit at the Country Music Hall of Fame profiling the group Florida Georgia Line in 2022. |
| Oswald Cobblepot | Gotham | 2014 | This adaptation of DC Comics supervillain, the Penguin, emerged as a breakout character from test screenings of the pilot. |
| Steve Harrington | Stranger Things (2016–2025) | 2016 | Steve Harrington, initially portrayed as a rude, stereotypical high school boyfriend in Stranger Things, evolved over the course of the series into a kind-hearted, empathetic, and charismatic character that has become a fan-favorite. |
| Rich DotCom | Blindspot (2015–2020) | 2016 | Rich DotCom (Ennis Esmer) first appeared in the ninth episode of Blindspot, after creator Martin Gero realized that the James Bond-esque villain introduced in the original draft was not working. Although initially introduced as a Dark Web confronted by the FBI, he was brought back for subsequent episodes, in which his character was further developed, and revealed to be more morally complex than initially portrayed. Gero eventually realized Rich had become an integral part of the show having come to regard him as the defining character of the series. |
| Christopher Pike | Star Trek (1964–present) | 1964 (breakout status in 2019) | Christopher Pike, played by Jeffrey Hunter, was introduced in "The Cage," the 1964 pilot of Star Trek: The Original Series. However, Hunter declined the role when the show went to series, and the character was replaced by James T. Kirk (William Shatner). A crippled Pike, now played by Sean Kenney, would later make a guest appearance in "The Menagerie", which incorporated footage from "The Cage" featuring Hunter. The character would later play a supporting role in the feature films of the 2000s, played by Bruce Greenwood. He would subsequently be made a supporting character in Star Trek: Discovery in 2019, in which he was played by Anson Mount. Pike became a breakout character whose popularity among fans was attributed by critics to Mount's portrayal. Mount was contracted for only one season, but fans began a petition for his own spin-off. On May 15, 2020, CBS officially announced Star Trek: Strange New Worlds, a new television series starring Mount as Pike. Creator and executive producer Alex Kurtzman cited overwhelming positive fan response as one of the reasons for creating the show. |
| Grogu | The Mandalorian (2019–present) | 2019 | Grogu, unofficially referred to as Baby Yoda by fans and the media since its name would not be revealed until well into the second season, made his debut in the first episode of The Mandalorian and subsequently received significant media attention due to the numerous internet memes he spawned and the high demand but low supply of available merchandise of the character. |

== Video games ==
| Characters | Introduced in video game or series | Year introduced | Notes |
|---|---|---|---|
| Yoshi | Mario (1981–present) | 1990 | Yoshi in the Mario series. Originally appearing in Super Mario World as a rideable pet, he became one of the franchise's main characters, often appearing as one of Mario's sidekicks, and getting his own series of video games. |
| Zero | Mega Man X (1993–present) | 1993 | Zero from the Mega Man X series first appeared as a supporting character in the first installment, eventually eclipsing the titular protagonist and becoming one of the franchise's main characters. Zero's popularity spawned his own spin-off video game series in the 2000s, Mega Man Zero, to mostly positive reception. |
| Vincent Valentine | Final Fantasy VII (1997) | 1997 | Vincent Valentine from Final Fantasy VII was designed as an unlockable secret character. The option to recruit Vincent as a party member occurs late in the game's canon, and he has little involvement with the main narrative due to time constraints faced by the game's developers. The character's popularity with Final Fantasy fandom led to Vincent being featured more prominently in the subsequent Compilation of Final Fantasy VII multimedia metaseries. Notably, he is the protagonist and central character in the spin-off Dirge of Cerberus: Final Fantasy VII and its mobile phone tie-in. |
| Pablo Sanchez | Backyard Sports (1997–2010, 2015, 2024–present) | 1997 | Pablo Sanchez from the Backyard Sports franchise first appeared in Humongous Entertainment's Backyard Baseball (1997) as one of thirty playable characters to choose from. A short, pudgy, Hispanic American boy who normally speaks Spanish in most of his appearances, he was designed by Humongous to be a gag character who looked like the "worst" character in the game, but was given the highest overall skill ratings and the nickname "Secret Weapon" with the intention that the game's players would "quietly" discover him, only to backfire after the developers decided to make all the characters' skill ratings visible, causing players to quickly discover Pablo's batting talents. Pablo became the most popular character of the game, which resulted in him being consistently established as one of the strongest or the strongest character in subsequent games in the series and ultimately the series mascot. |
| Minsc | Baldur's Gate (1998–present) | 1998 | Minsc from the Baldur's Gate video game series. He was originally conceived by series developer Bioware as a comic relief sidekick and an optional party member with little relevance to the overarching plot. Ultimately emerging as the series' breakout star and most iconic character, Minsc is still acclaimed by video game enthusiasts, and has been repeatedly referenced in non-Bioware games and media. Minsc and his hamster companion Boo have appeared in the massively multiplayer online role-playing game Neverwinter, the webcomic Megatokyo, and a series of D&D-themed comic books published by IDW Publishing. |
| Miles Edgeworth | Ace Attorney (2001–present) | 2001 | Miles Edgeworth, known in Japan as Reiji Mitsurugi, is a character in Capcom's Ace Attorney series. He first appears as the antagonist in Phoenix Wright: Ace Attorney, serving as the prosecutor against defense attorney Phoenix Wright, but in later games he mellows into Wright's friendly rival. The character was instantly popular with audiences and has appeared in nearly every game in the series since. He eventually starred as the protagonist in the spin-off game Ace Attorney Investigations: Miles Edgeworth and its sequel, a move that series creator Shu Takumi acknowledged was the result of Edgeworth's popularity eclipsing that of protagonist Phoenix Wright. In a 2024 survey released by Capcom, Miles Edgeworth was voted as the #1 most popular Ace Attorney character. |
| Shadow the Hedgehog | Sonic the Hedgehog (1991–present) | 2001 | Shadow the Hedgehog made his debut in the 2001 video game Sonic Adventure 2, and became an instant hit among fans of the Sonic the Hedgehog franchise. Despite ostensibly dying in his maiden outing, developers Sega and Sonic Team quickly revived the character, giving him a pivotal role in the next installment in the series, Sonic Heroes. By 2005, Shadow had become the star of his own spin-off title, Shadow the Hedgehog. In the same year, series producer Yuji Naka stated that Shadow was the second-most popular character in the series, after the protagonist Sonic. Despite appearing only inconsistently across series titles over the following two decades, Shadow remained so highly-regarded that Sega eventually declared 2024 their 'Year of Shadow the Hedgehog'. |
| Alyx Vance | Half-Life (1998–present) | 2004 | Alyx Vance from the Half-Life series. A supporting non-player character who first appeared in 2004's Half-Life 2, she played a major speaking role as player character Gordon Freeman was a silent protagonist. Alyx has transitioned into the role of player character for the 2020 video game Half-Life: Alyx. |
| Rabbids | Rabbids (2006–present) | 2006 | The Rabbids began as enemies in the Rayman video game series, before their "vicious, but (...) totally stupid" antics proved to overshadow the main character. They have since been franchised to television and their own spin-off video game series. |
| GLaDOS | Portal (2007–present) | 2007 | GLaDOS, an AI personality core from the Portal series. Originally intended to appear solely in the first area of Portal, she was well received by play testers for her complex personality as an initial encouraging companion, eventually becoming a sadistic antagonist. GLaDOS has received widespread critical acclaim, her character particularly beloved as a creation of Valve. |
| Isabelle | Animal Crossing (2001–present) | 2012 | Isabelle, known in Japan as Shizue, first appeared in 2012's Animal Crossing: New Leaf, where she serves as the player character's secretary. Isabelle's breakout popularity led to her becoming one of the most prominent characters in the Animal Crossing franchise, to a point where the character is considered by some sources to be the mascot of a series which saw its first release in 2001. Isabelle's popularity has also led to appearances outside of the Animal Crossing series, including a playable role in the crossover games Mario Kart 8 and Super Smash Bros. Ultimate. |
| Dorian Pavus | Dragon Age (2009–present) | 2014 | Dorian Pavus first appears in 2014's Dragon Age: Inquisition as a supporting character and optional party member, and continues to make recurring appearances in franchise media. Dorian has been noted by some commentators as a breakout video game character who is openly gay, and that he occupies a significant role in the narrative of a major AAA video game which most other LGBT characters at the time lack. |
| Lady Dimitrescu | Resident Evil (1996–present) | 2021 | Lady Dimitrescu appears in 2021's Resident Evil Village, where she serves as an early game antagonist. The character quickly and unexpectedly rose in popularity internationally after Capcom released a series of demos and previews for Resident Evil Village in early 2021. Maggie Robertson's performance as the character through voiceover and motion capture was also widely acclaimed, and won her multiple awards. |
| Amelia | Pathways (2025) | 2025 | Amelia was created as a villain for Pathways, an educational game produced for the UK Home Office meant to identify and illustrate the dangers of nativism. The purple-haired conservative activist was embraced by the communities it was seeking to warn against as a mascot, due to her unconventional attractiveness and reflection of their views, spawning a series of unironic memes, which eventually forced the Home Office to withdraw Pathways from the Internet. |
