= Bloom County: The Complete Library =

Book series

Publication information
- Publisher: The Library of American Comics
- Schedule: biannual
- Format: Hardcover
- Genre: Humour; Political satire Satire
- Publication date: September 2009 – November 2012
- No. of issues: 7 in total: 5 Bloom County; 1 Outland; 1 Opus
- Main character(s): Milo Bloom; Cutter John; Steve Dallas; Michael Binkley; Opus the Penguin; Bill the Cat; Hodge-Podge; Portnoy; Oliver Wendell Jones

Creative team
- Written by: Berkeley Breathed
- Artist: Berkeley Breathed
- Editor: Scott Dunbier

Bloom County: The Complete Library is a book series published by The Library of American Comics which collects the complete comic strips Bloom County, Outland and Opus all written and drawn by Berkeley Breathed between 1980 and 2008. The first volume of this series was published in September, 2009, and also received the Eisner award in the category Best Archival Collection/Project—Strips in 2010; the seventh and final volume was published in November 2012.

== Background ==
When Breathed was approached by the Library of American Comics (LoAC) to publish a complete collection of Bloom County, he was initially resistant to the idea of a new reprint of his works. His opinion was that much of the strip's content was badly dated, which in turn hindered him from agreeing to LoAC's idea of a publication. LoAC continued to pitch the project and finally persuaded Breathed with the argument that "context pages" would be added to inform readers about what was going on when the strips were first published, so that readers would more readily comprehend the political satire.

When The Library of American Comics announced the publication of a hardcover series, other collections of the strip were still in print; however, these had never covered the entire output of Bloom County comic strips, a fact that LoaC had used to justify publishing a complete collection. Breathed himself estimated that around 80 percent of the comic strip had never been reproduced in any of the previous collections prior to Bloom County: The Complete Library. This was due to his lack of confidence in the work and therefore selecting only the best-of every year for reprinting in these other collections.

Breathed's own opinion on this complete collection, was that it was "a mixed blessing," since he thought the books themselves were beautiful, but disliked being confronted with very dated contents and comic strips he had not revisited for 25 years. At first he considered writing all the strip annotations a chore, but later, as old memories came back, it became something enjoyable, and the fact that he had many behind-the-strip stories to share was a benefit to his readers.

== Format ==
The volumes of this complete library features approximately 3,500 strips in total, in editions which each collect two years of daily and Sunday strips in chronological order, each comprised by approximately 300 pages. All the books are hardcover and measure 11 inches × 8.5 inches, (279 mm × 216 mm), and have been designed by Dean Mullaney.

Among the comic strips, there are parts taking up the historical context for the strip. The books were edited by Scott Dunbier, foreword by the creator Breathed is included in all volumes as well as an essay by Ted Koppel. A selection of Breathed's pre-Bloom County strips, among these quite a few from The Academia Waltz and some from other stand in comic strips which was drawn as backups for the first publisher, in case if the regular strips was not received on time for printing. The extensive notings and recollections by Breathed himself, annotations and behind-the-scenes anecdotes by the creator are also featured. The editions of Outland and Opus in this LoAC line were the first ever reprints of these two strips done in a complete, full color, chronological order.

== Volumes ==
Bloom County volumes
Volume	Release date	Title	Period	Page count	ISBN
1	2009-09-29	“Bloom County: The Complete Library - Vol. 1”	1980–1982	288	978-1-60010-531-9
2	2010-04-29	“Bloom County: The Complete Library - Vol. 2”	1982–1984	320	978-1-60010-583-8
3	2010-10-26	“Bloom County: The Complete Library - Vol. 3”	1984–1986	272	978-1-60010-755-9
4	2011-04-12	“Bloom County: The Complete Library - Vol. 4”	1986–1987	288	978-1-60010-899-0
5	2011-10-25	“Bloom County: The Complete Library - Vol. 5”	1987–1989	288	978-1-61377-128-0

Spinoff title volumes
Volume	Release date	Title	Period	Page count	ISBN
NA	2012-07-10	“Bloom County: The Complete Library - Outland”	1989–1995	304	978-1-61377-176-1
NA	2012-11-27	“Bloom County: The Complete Library - Opus”	2003–2008	272	978-1-61377-408-3
