= The Last Basselope =

1992 book by Berkeley Breathed

The Last Basselope, One Ferocious Story
- Author: Berkeley Breathed
- Illustrator: Berkeley Breathed
- Cover artist: Berkeley Breathed
- Language: English
- Series: Bloom County
- Genre: Comedy
- Publisher: Little Brown & Co
- Publication date: April 1, 1992
- Publication place: United States

The Last Basselope is a children's book by Berkeley Breathed published in 1992. The 32 page story depicts Breathed's Outland characters, led by Opus the Penguin, hunting the last remaining specimen of a purportedly fierce beast called a Basselope. Once found, the beast—named Rosebud—turns out to be friendly and harmless.

The book has been recommended as a resource with which to teach about the concept of endangered species and extinction.
