= Goodnight Opus =

1993 book by Berkeley Breathed

- Author: Berkeley Breathed
- Illustrator: Berkeley Breathed
- Cover artist: Berkeley Breathed
- Language: English
- Series: Bloom County
- Genre: Comedy
- Publisher: Little, Brown & Co.
- Publication date: 1993
- Publication place: United States
- ISBN: 978-0-316-10853-9

Goodnight Opus (ISBN 978-0-316-10853-9) is a 1993 children's book by Berkeley Breathed featuring Opus the Penguin.

== Plot ==
Goodnight Opus is a take-off of the popular Goodnight Moon children's book; this book actually begins with Opus being read Goodnight Moon by a maternal nanny figure while he sits in bed in his pink pajamas. After the nanny falls asleep while reading, Opus goes on his own journey to say goodnight to all sorts of fanciful beings and animals. The entire journey is an ode to imagination and to going beyond the last pages of a book ("departed the text"). Because the book encourages readers to think radically, it has "been banned in seventeen countries with early bedtimes", according to Breathed's website.

The book ultimately served as a foreshadowing of Opus's fate; in the character's final story-arc in the Opus comic strip, he is encouraged by the ghost of Elvis and Breathed himself to choose someplace where he can spend eternity in peace. The final strip finds that Opus has chosen to spend eternity sleeping in the bed on the final page of Goodnight Moon.
