= Linsay House =

Historic house in Iowa, United States

- Lindsay House
- U.S. National Register of Historic Places
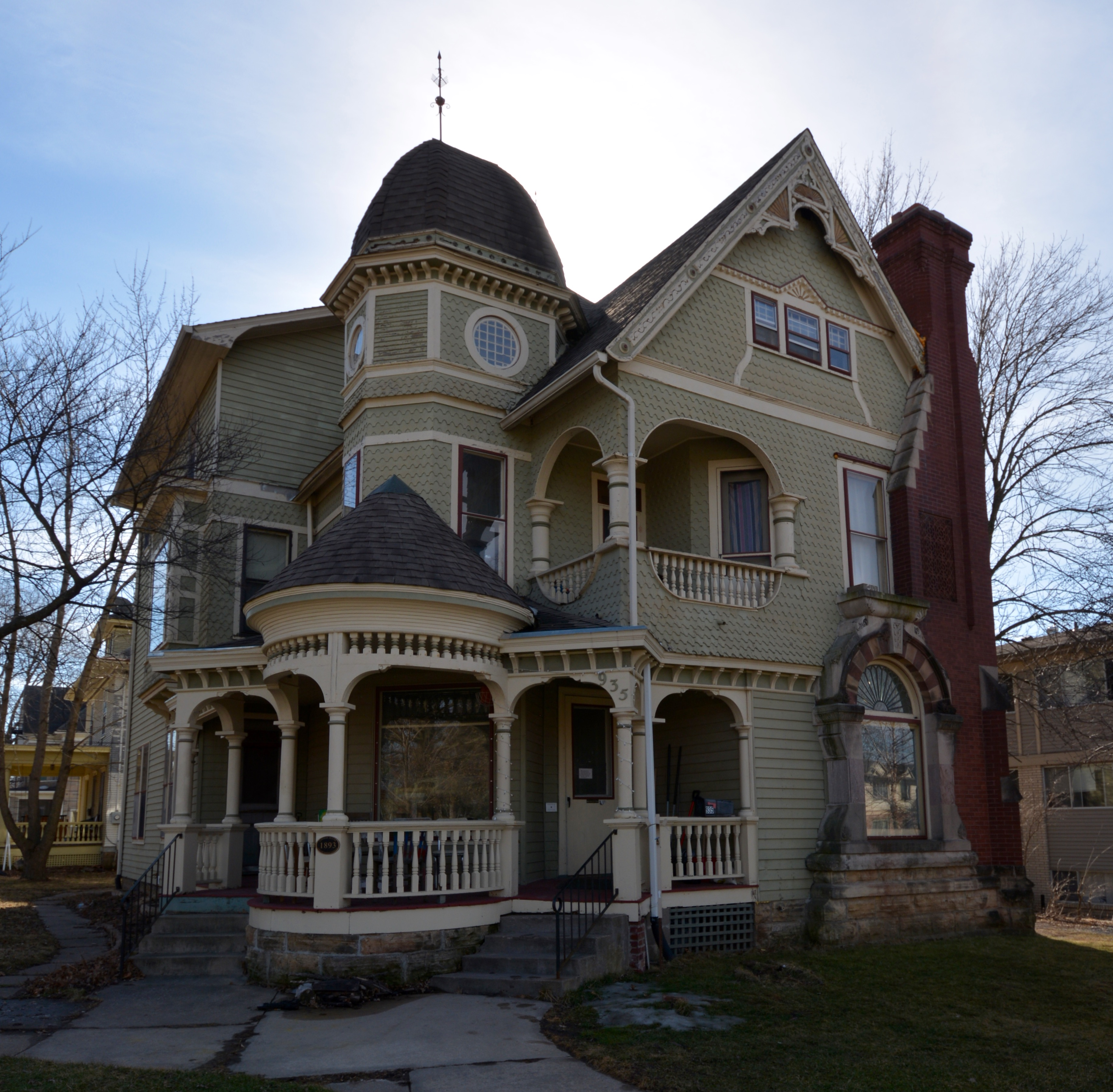

- Location within Iowa Location within the United States
- Location: 935 E. College; Iowa City, Iowa
- Coordinates: 41°39′31″N 91°31′17.2″W
- Area: less than one acre
- Built: 1893
- Architect: George F. Barber and Co.
- Architectural style: Queen Anne
- NRHP reference No.: 77000529
- Added to NRHP: August 2, 1977

The Lindsay House is a historic building located in Iowa City, Iowa, United States. It was listed, misspelled as the Linsay House, on the National Register of Historic Places in 1977. The house was built in 1893 by John Jayne, an Iowa City bridge builder. The plans for the 2½-story, frame, Queen Anne were purchased from George F. Barber and Co. It features a chimney that takes up an entire corner of the main facade, a stone arch that surrounds the first-floor window with leaded glass in a sunflower pattern, a wrap-around porch with a corner turret, and a three-story octagonal tower behind it.

Jayne gave the house as a wedding gift to his daughter, Ella, and her husband, John Granger Lindsay. The Lindsays moved to Chicago in 1913. It was the Theta Xi fraternity Xi chapter house from 1914-1915. The house was subsequently divided into apartments, and in 2005 became a 10-bedroom unit of the River City Housing Collective.

Berkeley Breathed, who wrote the comic strip Bloom County, called the house one of "the ugliest houses in the five-state area... Six different architectural styles in one house is a milestone at least and at most a landmark to bad taste". Breathed used the house as the model for the boarding house where Bloom County is partially set.

== See also ==
- List of George Franklin Barber works
