= Edwurd Fudwupper Fibbed Big =

- Directed by: Berkeley Breathed
- Written by: Berkeley Breathed
- Based on: Edwurd Fudwupper Fibbed Big by Berkeley Breathed
- Produced by: George Johnson; Alison Savitch; Albie Hecht; Fonda Snyder; Berkeley Breathed
- Starring: Emily Osment; Justin Brinsfield; John Cleese; Frances McDormand; Jonathan Winters; Catherine O'Hara; Harry Shearer; Haley Joel Osment
- Edited by: Ray N. Mupas
- Music by: Paul Wickens
- Production companies: Nickelodeon Movies; Storyopolis; Threshold Entertainment
- Distributed by: Paramount Pictures
- Release date: November 17, 2000 (with Rugrats in Paris: The Movie)
- Running time: 9 minutes
- Country: United States
- Language: English

Edwurd Fudwupper Fibbed Big is a 2000 animated comedy short film based on the book by Berkeley Breathed starring Emily Osment. The film also stars Justin Brinsfield, John Cleese, Frances McDormand, Jonathan Winters, Catherine O'Hara, Harry Shearer and Haley Joel Osment. It was shown in front of Rugrats in Paris: The Movie in select theaters.

== Cast ==
- Haley Joel Osment as Edwurd Fudwupper
- Frances McDormand as the adult Fannie (narrator)
- Emily Osment as the child Fannie
- John Cleese as the giant alien
- Jonathan Winters as the president (live-action footage)
- Catherine O'Hara as Lorna Mae Loon
- Harry Shearer as the general
- Justin Brinsfield as Mabel Dill
- Berkeley Breathed as the alien pigs, the father and a mouse (uncredited)
