= A Wish for Wings That Work =

1991 American children's book and TV special

- Cover
- Author: Berkeley Breathed
- Illustrator: Berkeley Breathed
- Cover artist: Berkeley Breathed
- Language: English
- Genre: Children's
- Publisher: Little Brown & Co
- Publication date: 1991
- Publication place: United States
- Pages: 32
- ISBN: 0-316-10691-7

A Wish for Wings That Work: An Opus Christmas Story is a children's book by Berkeley Breathed that was published in 1991. It was made into an animated television special that same year. The book and special feature characters from Breathed's comic strips Bloom County and Outland.

== Plot ==
The story centers on Opus the Penguin (a main character in all three of Breathed's comic strips and, at the time, appearing in Outland). Opus is downhearted because, as a penguin, he cannot fly. He orders a machine and assembles it, but when it comes time to test the machine by jumping off a three-mile-high cliff, Opus decides to do something less dangerous; he goes home to make anchovy Christmas cookies. He does not give up on his dream, though, and makes a Christmas wish to Santa Claus for "wings that will go!". On Christmas Eve, Santa is making his usual delivery when he loses his reindeer and crashes into a lake. Opus jumps in and uses his natural swimming skills to pull Santa out. To thank Opus for his daring rescue, a group of ducks pick him up and take him flying through the air.

== TV special ==
A Wish for Wings That Work
- 2007 DVD cover
- Also known as: Opus 'n' Bill: A Wish for Wings that Work
- Based on: A Wish for Wings That Work: An Opus Christmas Story and Outland by Berkeley Breathed
- Written by: Berkeley Breathed
- Directed by: Skip Jones
- Starring: Michael Bell; Joe Alaskey; John Byner; Tress MacNeille; Alexaundria Simmons; Andrew Hill Newman; Frank Welker; Robin Williams (as Sudy Nim)
- Music by: Thomas Chase; Steve Rucker
- Country of origin: United States
- Original language: English

Production
- Producer: Peggy Regan
- Editor: Larry C. Cowan
- Running time: 22 minutes
- Production companies: Amblin Television; Universal Cartoon Studios

Original release
- Network: MCA TV
- Release: December 18, 1991

On December 18, 1991, an animated special based on the book aired on CBS. It was directed by Skip Jones and was produced by Peggy Regan for Steven Spielberg's Amblin Television for Universal Cartoon Studios. It was released on DVD on November 6, 2007.

=== Voice cast ===
- Michael Bell – Opus
- Joe Alaskey – Truffles, The Ducks
- John Byner – Bill
- Tress MacNeille – The Chicken
- Alexaundria Simmons – Ronald-Ann
- Andrew Hill Newman – Milquetoast the Cross-Dressing Cockroach
- Frank Welker – Santa Claus
- Sudy Nim – George the Kiwi

=== Critical reception ===
Lisa Horowitz of Variety gave the special a positive review, saying that it "crams a lot of action and intelligence into its half-hour". She also praised the animation and vocal performances.

Breathed, who was credited as the writer and executive producer of the special, was disappointed with the overall results. Asked in 2003 in The Washington Post where a copy of the special could be found on VHS or DVD, Breathed replied:

Hopefully in the rubbish pail. We can do better than that and we will with an eventual Opus film... but I'm glad you enjoyed it. I presume your family was on speed when they watched it. I would imagine it helps.

In a 2007 interview, Breathed said that the reason he disliked the special was simply "unspectacular ratings", and that his humor "wasn't meant for television, even if it was done right". He also blamed his own lack of writing experience, as he wrote the script, and that the director was "way over his head". Breathed said he had wanted Sterling Holloway (who by then was retired from voice acting due to old age and failing health) to provide the voice for Opus. Four years later, Breathed said the director inserted numerous inappropriate jokes into the special's background scenes.
