= Castor Oyl =

Fictional character from Popeye

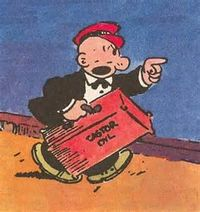

Publication information
- Publisher: King Features Syndicate
- First appearance: Thimble Theatre (1920)
- Created by: E. C. Segar

In-story information
- Partnerships: Lizzie Oyl (née Goozenwoozit) (1924); Cylinda Oyl (née Lotts) (1926 - 1928; 2022-present)
- Supporting character of: Olive Oyl (sister); Cole Oyl (father); Nana Oyl (mother); Deezil (daughter)

Castor Oyl is a fictional character, created in 1920 by cartoonist Elzie Crisler Segar for his comic strip Thimble Theatre, now known as Popeye.

== Publication history ==
Castor Oyl is Olive Oyl's older brother, debuting in Thimble Theatre on January 14, 1920. While initially a minor character defined chiefly by his bizarre, paradoxical antics (often alleged by other characters to be a product of insanity), Segar progressively adapted Castor into more of an ambitious, enterprising everyman figure as the strip evolved into a serialized comedy-adventure style. By 1924, Castor had arguably displaced Harold Hamgravy as the protagonist of the strip, a role he occupied until the first appearance of the Popeye character in January 1929.

In response to Castor's increasing prominence, Segar introduced a number of secondary characters acting as foils to his antics, most notably his wife Cylinda Oyl, to whom he was married from August 1926 to June 1928, his fighting cockerel Blizzard, a major character from August 1923 to January 1925, and Cylinda's father, the elderly, moneyed miser I. Canniford Lotts.

A quick-witted diminutive adventurer, Castor Oyl initially continued to be an important character in Thimble Theatre following Popeye's introduction, yet had largely exited the regular cast by the end of 1931 and played virtually no role in the Popeye theatrical cartoons produced first by Fleischer Studios and then by Famous Studios. His most prominent appearance in the series is as a member of Popeye's orchestra in the 1935 short The Spinach Overture.

Since Randy Milholland took over the strip in 2022, Castor, his wife Cylinda—with whom he has reconciled—and their daughter Deezil have started appearing in the strip again.

In the 1980 film directed by Robert Altman, Castor is a key character, and is played by actor Donovan Scott. In the film, however, he is made Olive's younger brother and is considerably less sophisticated than his comic strip counterpart.

Castor Oyl is named after castor oil, a medicine often given to children for various ailments until the mid 20th century. His mother Nana's name derives from "banana oil", an epithet similar to "baloney". His father Cole's name derives from "coal oil", a now arcane term for kerosene. His daughter Deezil's name derives from "diesel oil." His wife Cylinda’s name derives from cylinder oil.
