= E. C. Segar =

American cartoonist (1894–1938)

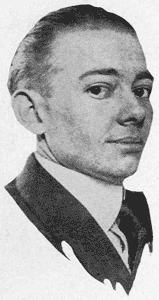
- Illustration of Segar, 1928
- Born: Elzie Crisler Segar; December 8, 1894 Chester, Illinois, U.S.
- Died: October 13, 1938 (aged 43) Santa Monica, California, U.S.
- Area: Cartoonist
- Notable works: Popeye (1929–1938)

Elzie Crisler Segar (/ˈsiːɡɑːr/; December 8, 1894 – October 13, 1938), known by the pen name E. C. Segar, was an American cartoonist. He created Popeye in 1929, introducing the character in his comic strip Thimble Theatre.

Charles M. Schulz said of Segar's work: "I think Popeye was a perfect comic strip, consistent in drawing and humor". Carl Barks described Segar as "the unbridled genius as far as I was concerned".

== Early life ==
Segar was born on December 8, 1894, and raised in Chester, Illinois, a small town near the Mississippi River. The son of Erma Irene (Crisler) and Amzi Andrews Segar, a handyman, his earliest work experiences included assisting his father in house painting and paper hanging. Skilled at playing drums, he also provided musical accompaniment to films and vaudeville acts in the local theater, where he was eventually given the job of film projectionist at the Chester Opera House, where he also did live performances. At age 18, he decided to become a cartoonist. He took a correspondence course in cartooning from W. L. Evans of Cleveland, Ohio. He said that after work he "lit up the oil lamps about midnight and worked on the course until 3 a.m." During this time, Segar also began studying the work of cartoonists that he would later cite as influences on his work, including Rube Goldberg, George McManus and George Herriman (especially Herriman's strip Stumble Inn).

Asked how to say his name, he told The Literary Digest it was "SEE-gar". He commonly signed his work simply Segar or E. Segar above a drawing of a cigar.

== Early work ==
Segar moved to Chicago, Illinois, where he met Richard F. Outcault, the creator of The Yellow Kid and Buster Brown. Outcault encouraged him and introduced him at the Chicago Herald. On March 12, 1916, the Herald published Segar's first comic, Charlie Chaplin's Comic Capers, which ran for a little over a year. In 1917, Segar created Barry the Boob, about an incompetent soldier. Segar also originated two other, short-lived comics for the Herald's Sunday magazine. These were The Mistakes of Mr. Muddle and the Rube Goldberg-inspired And They Get By With It. In 1918, he moved on to William Randolph Hearst's Chicago Evening American, for which he created Looping the Loop and worked as a second-string drama critic. Looping the Loop was a comic strip that gave a whimsical take on the events in Chicago's "Loop" district. "Looping the Loop" made jokes about such issues as silent movies, plays, and the changing seasons; it proved popular with the Herald's readers. Segar married Myrtle Johnson that year; they had two children. In October 1919, Segar covered that year's World Series, creating eight cartoons for the sports pages.

== Thimble Theatre, Sappo and Popeye ==
Evening American managing editor William Curley thought Segar could succeed in New York, so he sent him to King Features Syndicate, where Segar worked for many years. King Features asked Segar to create a comic strip to replace Midget Movies by Ed Wheelan, who had recently resigned from the syndicate. Segar created Thimble Theatre for the New York Journal, as the replacement for Wheelan's strip. The Thimble Theatre strip made its debut on December 19, 1919, featuring the characters Olive Oyl, Castor Oyl and Harold Hamgravy, whose name was quickly shortened in the strip to simply "Ham Gravy". They were the strip's leads for about a decade. Segar began writing long storylines or "continuities" for Thimble Theatre in 1922. In these, the characters would have lengthy adventures in Africa and the Wild West. In one storyline, the characters encountered a superhuman "tough guy" named Harry Hardegg, who was able to break a moving buzz saw with his head. Comics historian Bill Blackbeard has described Harry Hardegg as a "prototype" for Popeye.

E. C. Segar's Sappo (1933)

Segar also created The Five-Fifteen for King Features in 1920; it was retitled Sappo in 1926, although numerous newspapers had already retitled the strip 'Sappo the Commuter' by 1924. The Five-Fifteen started its run as a Monday-through-Saturday strip, concluding its initial daily run in February 1925. In 1926, the strip, now officially retitled, was revived as a Sunday-only topper to the Thimble Theatre Sunday pages. Initially, this strip revolved about the exploits of suburban couple John and Myrtle Sappo. In May 1932, however, Segar introduced the eccentric scientist and inventor (and self-proclaimed "genius") O.G. Wotasnozzle into the strip as a regular. Wotasnozzle's bizarre machines soon became the focus of the strip, with John Sappo frequently cast as his test subject and straight man.

On January 17, 1929, when Castor Oyl needed a mariner to navigate his ship to Dice Island, Castor picked up a weatherbeaten sailor named Popeye in the docks. Popeye's first line in the strip, upon being asked if he was a sailor, was "'Ja think I'm a cowboy?" It is believed Segar remembered a tough laborer named Frank "Rocky" Fiegel who was always getting in fights but also gave out candy and treats to children, including a young Segar. At first Segar intended Popeye to be a once-off character, but after large numbers of newspaper readers wrote in requesting the character's return, Segar reintroduced Popeye as a full-time regular in August 1929, eventually enabling the sailor to become the focal point of the strip. Segar initially depicted Popeye as a quarrelling antihero. Segar's storylines for the Popeye-focused Thimble Theatre drew on several fictional genres, including Westerns, pirate swashbucklers, sports stories, and fantasy stories. Some of the other notable characters Segar created include J. Wellington Wimpy and Eugene the Jeep.

In 1929, Segar and his friend, screenwriter Norton S. Parker, began work on The Sea Hag, a prose novel for adults that would have featured both Popeye and the villainess the Sea Hag. However, King Features refused to grant Segar and Parker permission to publish the novel. The Sea Hag has never been put into print.

In 1934, King Features (noting the increasing popularity of the Popeye character with children) ordered Segar to tone down Popeye's swearing and brawling. Although irritated by the order, Segar complied, and made Popeye more of a straightforward hero, more ubiquitously emphasizing his already-established affinity for aiding children and animals rather than his more violent and irascible tendencies, which persisted in a somewhat reduced form. Segar continued to produce Thimble Theatre, published in five hundred newspapers globally by 1938, until his death. Beginning in 1933, Popeye was adapted into a series of cartoons by the Fleischer Studios, which increased the character's already-ascendant popularity even further. Popeye was also licensed by King Features for hundreds of toys, games and other products. The commercial success of these products ensured King Features paid Segar highly for his work; by 1938, the syndicate was giving Segar a salary of $100,000 a year.

== Later life and death ==
Segar later moved to Santa Monica, California. According to Bud Sagendorf, he lived near George Herriman. Although they admired each other's work, they never visited each other in this period. After a prolonged illness, Segar died of liver disease on October 13, 1938, aged 43 years old.

== Legacy and reprints ==
Segar was among the first cartoonists to combine humorous situations with long-running adventures.

Comics creators who cited E.C. Segar's work as an influence included Jerry Siegel and Joe Shuster, Boody Rogers, Charles M. Schulz, Carl Barks, Robert Crumb, and Stephen Hillenburg.

A revival of interest in Segar's creations began with Woody Gelman's Nostalgia Press. Robert Altman's live-action film Popeye (1980) is adapted from E. C. Segar's Thimble Theatre comic strip. The screenplay by Jules Feiffer was based directly on Gelman's Thimble Theatre Starring Popeye the Sailor, a hardcover reprint collection of 1936–37 Segar strips published in 1971 by Nostalgia Press. In 2006, Fantagraphics published the first of a six-volume book set reprinting all Thimble Theatre daily and Sunday strips from 1928 to 1938, beginning with the adventure that introduced Popeye.

An Italian comics version of Popeye (renamed Braccio di Ferro), with some of characters changed and others added, was published from 1963 to 1994 in Italy by Editoriale Metro.

In 1971, the National Cartoonists Society created the Elzie Segar Award in his honor. According to the Society's website, the award was "presented to a person who has made a unique and outstanding contribution to the profession of cartooning." The NCS board of directors chose the first winners, while King Features selected recipients in later years. Honorees have included Charles Schulz, Bil Keane, Al Capp, Bill Gallo and Mort Walker. The award was discontinued in 1999.

In 2012, cartoonists Roger Langridge and Bruce Ozella teamed to revive the spirit of Segar in a 12-issue limited series, Popeye, published by IDW.

In 2018, Sunday Press Books published Thimble Theatre & The Pre-Popeye Comics of E.C. Segar, collecting Segar's early comic strip work, primarily the Thimble Theatre Sunday pages published between 1925 and 1930.

== Timeline ==
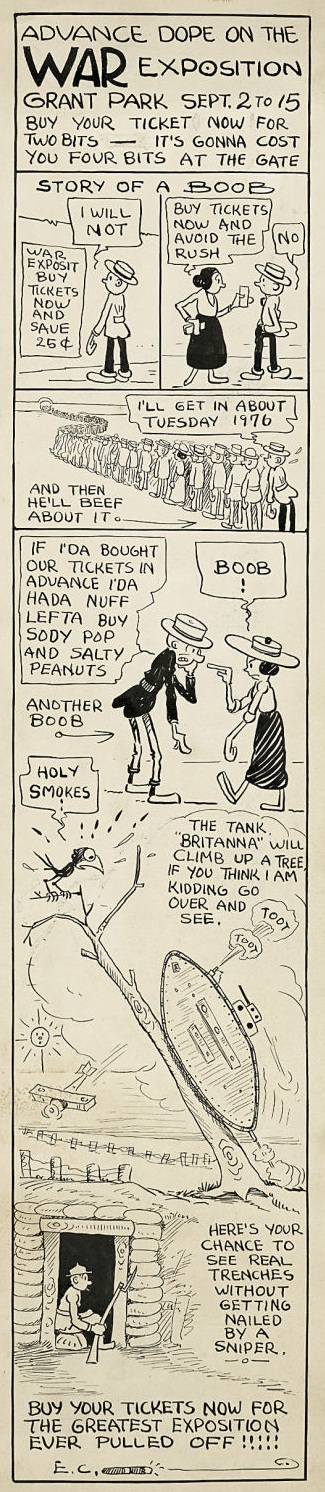
E. C. Segar's Looping the Loop (1918)

Title	Start date	End date
Charlie Chaplin's Comic Capers	March 1916	April 1917
The Mistakes of Mr. Muddle	March 1917 (Note: The exact start date of this strip is unknown.)	April 1918
And They Get By With It	March 1917	April 1918
Barry the Boob	April 1917	April 1918
Looping the Loop	June 1918	December 1919
Thimble Theatre (Popeye)	December 1919	October 1938
The Five-Fifteen (Sappo)	December 1920	October 1938

== Popeye & Friends Character Trail ==
In 1977, Segar's hometown of Chester, Illinois, named a park in his honor. The park contains a six-foot-tall bronze statue of Popeye. The annual Popeye Picnic, a weekend-long event that celebrates the character with a parade, film festival and other activities, is held the first weekend after Labor Day. In 2006, Chester launched the "Popeye & Friends Character Trail", which links a series of statues of Segar's characters located throughout town. Each stands on a base inscribed with the names of donors who contributed to its cost and is unveiled and dedicated during the Popeye Picnic. The 2006 debut sculpture of hamburger-loving Wimpy stands in Gazebo Park. A statue of Olive Oyl, Swee'Pea and the Jeep, located near the Randolph County Courthouse, followed in 2007. In 2008, a Bluto statue was dedicated at the corner of Swanwick and W. Holmes Streets, in front of Buena Vista Bank. The 2009 statue of Castor Oyl and Bernice the Whiffle Hen stands in front of Chester Memorial Hospital. One additional statue has been unveiled each year.

Year	Character(s)	Location
2010	SeaHag/Bernard	McDonald's/Walmart
2011	Cole Oyl	Chester Public Library
2012	Alice the Goon	Chester Center
2013	Poopdeck Pappy	Cohen Complex
2014	Prof. Watasnozzle	Chester High School
2015	RoughHouse	Reids' Harvest House
2016	Nephews-Peepeye/Poopeye/Pipeye/Pupeye	Chester Grade School
2017	King Blozo	Chester City Hall
2018	Nana Oyl	Manor at Craig's Farm
2019	Popeye's Pups	Chester Firehouse
2019	Sherlock & Segar	Baskerville Hall on Swanwick Street
2020	Toar	St Nicholas Landmark
2021	Harold Hamgravy	Randolph County Courthouse

Spinach Can Collectibles/Popeye Museum is located in the center of the city (Opera House).

On December 8, 2009, Google celebrated Segar's 115th birthday with a Google Doodle of Popeye. The doodle used Popeye's body as the 'g', had 'oogl', drawn to resemble Segar's drawing style, and a spinach can as the 'e', and featured Popeye punching the 'oogl' to cause the spinach to fly at him through the air.

== Sources ==
- Grandinetti, Fred (2004). Popeye: An Illustrated Cultural History. McFarland. ISBN 978-0-7864-1605-9.
