= Opus (comic strip) =

2003–2008 comic strip by Berkeley Breathed

- Opus the Penguin
- Author: Berkeley Breathed
- Current status/schedule: Discontinued Sunday strip
- Launch date: November 23, 2003
- End date: November 2, 2008
- Syndicate: Washington Post Writers Group
- Genre(s): Humor, Politics, Satire
- Preceded by: Outland

Opus was a Sunday strip drawn by Berkeley Breathed from November 23, 2003, to November 2, 2008. It was Breathed's fourth comic strip, following The Academia Waltz, Bloom County and Outland.

Set in Bloom County, the satirical strip featured Breathed's character Opus the Penguin. It was launched on November 23, 2003, and was syndicated by The Washington Post Writers Group. In early October 2008, the author declared he was terminating the strip because of his expectation that the United States was going to face tough times and his desire to depart from his most famous character "on a lighter note".

== Characters ==
=== Opus ===
Opus is the title character and protagonist of the strip. Though he returned to Antarctica at the end of Outland, Opus traveled back home to Bloom County, only to find that time has changed everything and everyone he once held dear. His employment usually depended on the week's joke – since Opus began, he has so far been a political operative, a garbageman, and a newspaper ombudsman – but he was most often depicted as a syndicated cartoonist.

While his mother, maiden name Bougm, was no longer "long-lost," she was not all he had imagined her to be after a decades-long search, and he was frequently seeking the comfort of an ideal mother-figure.

In a 2003 interview with The A.V. Club, Breathed revealed that "Opus was named after a Kansas song." (The band's 1976 album Leftoverture includes the song "Opus Insert" and a suite called "Magnum Opus".) He also added, "If you're too young to know who Kansas was, to hell with you."

=== Regular characters ===
- Bill the Cat – the first of Opus' old friends to re-emerge (just months into the strip), Bill seemed to be the only one completely unchanged by time. Still in a state of catatonia, he was occasionally tapped to run for political office but most often seen relaxing by Opus' side. He did not appear in many strips through the summer and fall of 2008, though.
- Steve Dallas – Steve was reintroduced little more than a year in, making him the only character to have appeared in a major role in all four of Breathed's comic strips. Steve, who had come out as gay at the end of Outland, was back to his former chauvinistic ways, apparently as a result of so-called "reparative therapy" (i.e., conversion therapy). Steve's lack of ability to charm women, however, remained. He had aged quite noticeably and appeared to be in his mid 50s, with graying temples and a receding hairline, but still retained his trademark sunglasses.
- Pickles – A little girl with a little bit of "snarky energy" (she first appeared as a self-proclaimed Viking princess), Pickles immediately began tagging along with Opus and Bill. She appeared much less frequently towards the end of the strip's run.
- Auggie Dallas – Steve's long lost son, reunited with his father after many years. He had nothing but admiration for Steve, even though Steve was sometimes reluctant to act like a father figure. His name may be a reference to Augie Doggie.
- Michael Binkley – A longtime friend of Opus who began appearing in the strip after a somewhat unexplained twelve-year absence (see below). He appeared as he did in Bloom County, inexplicably not aging as Steve Dallas had.

=== Other characters ===
- Senator Bedfellow – Though previously convicted on corruption charges, Bedfellow returned later on, still usually drunk and plagued by reporters.
- Editor of the Bloom Picayune – Usually Opus' boss, the Picayune's editor was depicted as hyper-stressed and suicidal, though somewhat older than he was in Bloom County.
- Oliver Wendell Jones – For some reason, Oliver was shown, like Binkley, to be the same age as he had been in Bloom County and Outland. He reappeared on August 5, 2007.
- Lola Granola – Opus' one-time fiancée (back in the days of Bloom County), Lola reappeared on August 12, 2007 as Steve's girlfriend.
- Berkeley Breathed – On November 25, 2007, the cartoonist appeared as himself (using a likeness of Sean Connery as James Bond instead of drawing his own face) and "announced" that Jim Davis's character Garfield is gay in a parody of author J. K. Rowling's ex post facto outing of the Harry Potter character Albus Dumbledore. The strip ended with Breathed calling Rowling a "lily-livered literary chicken".

=== Absent characters ===
Early on in the strip, it was revealed that Michael Binkley had fled Bloom County to become a teenage Tibetan eunuch after a disastrous first kiss (this kiss was described to Binkley by his older self from his anxiety closet in Bloom County). He was not heard from again until June 3, 2007, when he appeared in his child form without explanation.

At an autograph party for an Opus anthology book, Breathed revealed that the reason many of the original child characters had not returned is because in the years since the end of Outland, the child characters would have aged into teenagers, and Breathed had no interest in reviving the characters in that form.

== "Death" ==
On August 31, 2008, "the Creator" (Berkeley Breathed) spoke to Opus and hinted that the strip will end soon. The next week, Opus was visited by the ghost of Elvis who told Opus to find a place where he wants to be forever, because he will stay in that one spot after he "dies." e.g., Elvis is condemned to sit on the toilet forever because that's where he happened to be when he died.

Opus tried to fly to a tropical island on September 14, but when he was asked for his passport, he told the ticket clerk that he smuggled himself into the U.S. 30 years ago. He was promptly arrested by airport security while screaming, "God Bless George Bush!" Opus was taken to the Department of Homeland Security and waterboarded. The guards told him to "start talking, Akbar!" Opus complained to "the Creator," saying he couldn't just let the strip end like this. "The Creator" then placed Opus in an animal shelter, and mockingly said, "Happy?" to which Opus replied "NO!!"

The next week, September 26, 2008, saw Opus bemoaning having to spend his eternity in a county animal shelter. At the behest of a fellow inmate, a scruffy dog, Opus soon began sharing his memories of his past and recounts his life through the run of Breathed's strips. Many shots of him in well-known stories from Bloom County are then shown, including Opus saying "bozo" to a politician on the TV in 1981, misunderstanding a money-grubbing cultist in 1982, sharing a mass dandelion break with other characters in 1983, his role in the rock band Deathtöngue in 1984, dreaming romantically of Diane Sawyer in 1985, and a current joke about Sarah Palin set in 1986. The strip included a tag at the bottom indicating it would be continued the next week.

At this point, a trio of island-native girls arrive at the shelter; they only have room for one companion to live with them in their paradise.

On October 6, 2008, Breathed announced that the strip would end after November 2 that year, and even decided to do a contest for people to guess what Opus's fate is on BerkeleyBreathed.com. The winner will have $10,000 donated to the animal shelter of their choosing.

On October 19, 2008, Steve Dallas was shown barging into the Bloom County Animal Shelter's lobby demanding to see Opus, claiming Opus owed him $20. The clerk stationed there informed Steve that Opus had chosen his final eternity and that Steve should do so likewise, and very quickly. The conversation ended with Steve finally realizing he was in a cartoon strip by breaking the fourth wall and asking the clerk who "all those scruffy-looking people [are]" as he looked at the readers, to which the clerk replied, "Probably Democrats at this point," since he did this after dropping his towel, standing naked (but with a censor bar over his groin).

The next week, Steve found the tropical island girls and told them to give back Opus. It was then revealed that Opus had let his doggy companion in the shelter go with the girls, said "goodnight", and returned to the kennel. After seeing a vision of former Bloom County residents (Milo, Binkley, Oliver, Cutter John, Portnoy, and Bill the Cat) waving goodbye as they rode off into the distance atop Cutter John's wheelchair, Steve walked back to the animal shelter to find nothing but Opus' bow tie and an empty kennel. The final strip showed a glowing light coming from a box inside the kennel. Steve reaches into the box, and smiles at what he sees. The panel showed the address of a link to the Humane Society, which displayed the last panel as part of the $10,000 contest (it would later be printed in Berkeley Breathed's Opus: The Complete Library). The final strip showed Steve opening a copy of Goodnight Moon and seeing Opus tucked in bed, sleeping peacefully with a mother rabbit watching over him.

The 2015 revival of the Bloom County comic strip reveals that Opus is still alive, only that he has been unconscious the past 25 years and that the events of Opus and Outland were all an elaborate dream sequence.

== Production history ==
In numerous interviews before launching Opus, Berke Breathed stated his hopes that the strip would help reinvigorate the medium of newspaper comics. He criticized many modern strips, especially Garfield, for lacking expressive artwork or original humor.

In an interview appearing in the April 2007 issue of Texas Monthly, Breathed announced that he planned to end the strip by killing off the main character. On April 2, 2007 the journal Editor & Publisher reported on this interview in a story titled "Will Cartoonist Berkeley Breathed Kill Off Opus the Penguin?" However, Breathed's editor has reportedly quoted him as stating, "I mentioned Opus' literal death just for talking points on my [book] tour coming up. Not gonna kill him, but it's good for copy." Breathed confirmed that he was joking in an interview with Salon: "I was kidding about killing Opus, by the way. I'd like to walk the streets free from fears of spontaneous garroting."

In August 2008, the strip began a sequence playing off the 2007 interview, as "the Creator" of the strip informed Opus that "the end is near." The strip ended on Sunday, November 2, 2008, with Opus snugly in bed at the conclusion of Goodnight Moon.

== Artwork and availability ==
The original syndication contract for Opus stipulated that the strip occupy an entire half of a newspaper page. According to The Washington Post Writers Group, this was to provide "space for Breathed to offer richness and depth, similar to the breathtaking imagery in his popular children's books." While this style can appear hand-painted or airbrushed, it is actually rendered by Breathed on a computer using Adobe Photoshop. The half-page requirement was subsequently lifted, and the strip scaled down by most newspapers. Its original illustration style has also been largely abandoned in favor of a more hand-drawn look, much like that of Breathed's previous strip, Outland.

Initially, in an effort to help boost physical newspaper sales, the strip was barred from appearing online; however, in 2005, that too changed and Opus became officially available on the web.

On August 26, 2007, the strip featured Lola Granola wearing a headscarf, explaining that she was now a "radical Islamist." The cartoon was not printed by The Washington Post and many other papers. The following week's strip was also censored. Both strips were replaced by more innocuous strips in the printed versions, but the 'objectionable' strips relating to Lola's religious beliefs were offered in a variety of Internet comics sites, including Breathed's homepage and the "My Comics Page" site. This site now requires a paid "pro" registration for access to the censored strips, but free access to the censored strips is still available online.

== Unreleased film ==
In August 2006 The Weinstein Company revealed in a press release for an animated version of The Nutty Professor that it had a "CG-animated project" called "Opus" "in the works". Numerous online movie databases, including The New York Times, have entries for the movie, titled Opus: The Last Christmas, and give a release date of December 19, 2008. Some of these sites name Berkeley Breathed as the director, while others list Tim Bjorklund and Paul Taylor. Initially, Miramax Films was reported to have obtained the movie rights to the series, but the project migrated to The Weinstein Company with the departure of the Weinstein brothers from Disney and Miramax.

However, on May 8, 2007, during an interview by NPR radio host Diane Rehm, Mr. Breathed responded to an e-mail question regarding the existence of Opus: The Last Christmas by saying,

Uh, the better question is, 'Is there an Opus movie going to come out?' and the answer is 'no.' And, now I can say it's all for the better. Uh, the Weinstein brothers at Miramax tried for five years to develop an Opus movie, their first animated film, and it was, let me just say, it probably wasn't destined to be, as ... as it probably shouldn't. And the problem with developing these kinds of movies and films is that inevitably they discover that a property as idiosyncratic as a comic strip doesn't translate well unless you have the confidence of bringing the creator in and factoring him into the creation of the movie. They never, never do that. Yeah, um, they just don't trust us. So without that control there probably shouldn't be an Opus movie.

In a June 2007 interview with Salon.com, Breathed confirmed that the Miramax feature was "dead", but left the door open for an independently produced Opus film:

There'll only be a movie if I'm writing it, which will probably keep him off the big expensive screen ... probably just as well.

== Reprints ==
In 2012, The Library of American Comics published the complete Opus strip in their reprint series Bloom County: The Complete Library.
