= Harold Hamgravy =

Fictional character from Popeye

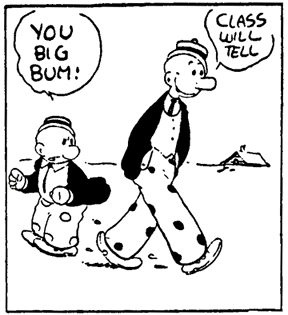
- Ham Gravy (right) and Castor Oyl (Thimble Theatre, August 5, 1923)

Publication information
- Publisher: King Features Syndicate
- First appearance: Thimble Theatre (December 19, 1919)
- Created by: E. C. Segar

Harold Hamgravy, better known as Ham Gravy, is an American comics character from the Thimble Theatre (later Popeye) series, created in 1919 by E. C. Segar.

== Publication history ==
Ham Gravy was the original fiancé of the better-known character Olive Oyl, but was often attracted to other women who were considerably wealthy. Ham was depicted as a slacker who preferred getting rich quick rather than earning money honestly. He was likewise heavily defined in-universe by the considerable size of his nose, often a subject of mockery to other characters. While initially the main protagonist of the strip, Ham was increasingly supplanted by Olive's brother Castor Oyl during the mid-1920s as the latter's characterization evolved into more of an everyman, although Ham nonetheless retained a focal role in several storylines during this period.

In a later strip, Castor and Ham hired a sailor named Popeye to man his ship for a treasure hunt. Intended as a minor supporting character, Popeye proved so popular with readers that he was made a permanent member of the main cast. As Popeye's role expanded, Ham was increasingly phased out of the comic, with the sailor ultimately replacing him as the subject of Olive Oyl's affections following a series of Sunday strips in March 1930. Following two background appearances in May 1930, Ham vanished as a regular altogether; while he made occasional appearances in the later Popeye strips, he never regained comparable prominence.

Ham makes a supporting appearance in the 1980 film Popeye, where Olive has recently left him and has since begun dating Bluto at the film's opening. He was played by Bill Irwin.
