= The Academia Waltz =

1978–1979 comic strip by Berkeley Breathed

- Cover of first collection
- Author: Berkeley Breathed
- Website: http://www.berkeleybreathed.com/ http://www.gocomics.com/academiawaltz/
- Current status/schedule: Concluded; reruns
- Launch date: 1978
- End date: 1979
- Syndicate(s): Reruns on GoComics (2003–present)
- Publisher: The Daily Texan
- Genre(s): Humor, Politics, Satire
- Followed by: Bloom County

The Academia Waltz was Berkeley Breathed's first comic strip, published daily from 1978 to 1979 in The Daily Texan at The University of Texas at Austin, where he was a student. The strip focused primarily on college life, although it sometimes made references to big news stories of the time (such as the Three Mile Island accident in 1979).

== Characters ==
- Steve Dallas: an arrogant, obnoxious fraternity member preoccupied with the pursuit of sex. He became an icon in many circles at the University of Texas, which was not Breathed's intent.
- Kitzi: Steve's sorority girlfriend. She often finds ways to bend Steve to her will, a fact not always clear to Steve. She and Steve were married in the comic's penultimate strip.
- Rabies: Steve's reluctant canine friend.
- Saigon John: a wheelchair-using Vietnam War veteran who frequently attends protest marches. He does not often see "eye to eye" with the conservative Steve.
- Val Blain: Kitzi's lovelorn best friend.

Two of the characters from The Academia Waltz would be resurrected for Breathed's next strip, Bloom County: Steve Dallas and Saigon John (renamed "Cutter John"). Rabies also became a character early on in the strip, but disappeared around the time that Opus the Penguin (who would later become Breathed's most popular character) appeared; Breathed cites one reason for Rabies being "retired" is that there was "no shortage of cartoon dogs".

Kitzi later made a guest appearance in Bloom County in 1985, although the character had been altered to be Steve's younger sister rather than his girlfriend (jailed for protesting Apartheid, even though their sorority doesn't even admit blacks).

== Collections ==
Two collections featuring the comic were published. They are currently out of print and extremely rare, or as Breathed's website claims, "eBay is your only hope."

- The Academia Waltz (1979)
- The Academia Waltz: Bowing Out (1980)

A few Academia Waltz comics were also reprinted in the Bloom County collection Classics of Western Literature (1990), as well as in Bloom County: The Complete Library: Volume One: 1980–1982 (2009).

In August 2015, IDW Publishing released an anthology titled "Berkeley Breathed’s Academia Waltz & Other Profound Transgressions." The anthology collects work from Breathed's college days, publishing his strips from The Daily Texan, his college newspaper from 1978 to 1979, along with scanned original art from his personal archives featuring Academia Waltz strips (with author's margin notes) and political cartoons.
