= Bill the Cat =

- Bloom County, Outland and Opus character
- First appearance: June 13, 1982
- Created by: Berkeley Breathed
- Voiced by: John Byner

In-universe information
- Species: Cat
- Gender: Male
- Occupation: Politician, Meadow Party
- Nationality: American

Bill the Cat, or Bill D. Cat, is a fictional cat appearing in the works of cartoonist Berkeley Breathed, beginning with the comic strip Bloom County in the 1980s and continuing in Outland and Opus in the following decades. Bill also appeared in some of Breathed's illustrated children's books, including A Wish for Wings That Work, which was also made into an animated Christmas television special, and also on greeting cards and other sundry merchandise. Bill was originally capable of speaking English reasonably well, but storylines featuring an automobile accident, repeated periods of drug abuse, and brain surgery have since seen the character transition to a nearly mentally handicapped mute state in which the cat's most frequent spoken sentiments are "Ack!" and "Thppt!" - the former a result of his regularly choking on hairballs, the latter an approximation of "blowing a raspberry".

The first strip with Bill the Cat announces he is a parody of Jim Davis' Garfield. Subsequently, Milo Bloom appears to fear a visit from United Feature Syndicate's copyright lawyers over Bill's similarities to Garfield. In the December 22, 2015 Facebook version of the comic, it was revealed that Bill the Cat is actually Garfield's son. Breathed has also described Bill as his attempt to create a character so repulsive that it would have absolutely no merchandising potential. But, somewhat unexpectedly, Bill the Cat trinkets and figurines have sold in great quantity, and often appear in the strips. Bill the Cat was also inspired by a colorful economist named Bill Moore. A graduate assistant at the University of Texas at Austin during the 1970s, Moore was one of Breathed's teachers. Recognizably wild-eyed (and one legged), Moore also became one of Breathed's friends. His name was further inspired by a local homeless man of Iowa City, Iowa, who was dubbed Bill "The Cat".

== Character biography ==
Born the illegitimate kitten of Jim Davis' Garfield, Bill the Cat's character was raised in Dubuque, Iowa, left for New York to become a film star and left his girlfriend, Sally, behind. Some of Bill the Cat's film roles include the leads in Orangestoke: The Legend of Bill, Lord of the Monkeys and Terms of Bill's Endearment (references to the films Greystoke: The Legend of Tarzan, Lord of the Apes and Terms of Endearment). During this period, he drank heavily, used illegal drugs, and "free-based Tender Vittles" until his friends helped him to recover. On September 30, 1983, Bill was driving his beloved primer-grey 1969 Pontiac GTO on Highway 58 outside of Tehachapi, California, traveling eastbound on the way to Gallup, New Mexico to give a motivational speech to the local Moose Lodge. According to multiple eyewitness accounts, the GTO was traveling the wrong way down the highway, driving erratically at a high speed when it hit a wild mule, became airborne and ultimately crashed into a Saguaro cactus, impaling Bill on the Hurst shifter and killing him instantly. California Highway Patrol troopers claim that Kansas' "Dust In The Wind" was playing on the 8-track player when they recovered the remains of the body. Also recovered at the scene was various drug paraphernalia as well as multiple copies of "Faster Pussycat", a popular underground "Kitty Porn" magazine. (The media, not wishing to divulge the true nature of Bill's death, claimed that he died of acne). The only part of Bill that was salvaged from the wreckage was his tongue, which young genius Oliver Wendell Jones used to clone Bill and bring him back to life. In the latter months of 1984, Bill's bid for the American presidency was effectively ruined by his decision to run off and join (and end up leading) the Bhagwan Shree Rajneesh cult in Oregon, only to be "rescued" and deprogrammed several weeks later by a humorous application of the Ludovico technique (by forcing him to watch reruns of Leave It to Beaver); this was ultimately unsuccessful and Bill was sent off to the Betty Ford Center. In the video A Wish for Wings That Work Opus professes to have saved Bill from a lab where his brains had been replaced with tater tots.

Bill spent time as an unintelligible rock star who sang and played "electric tongue" with his heavy metal band Deathtöngue, later Billy and the Boingers. Bill got rich when their song "U-Stink-But-I-♥-U" became a jingle for Wheat Thins, but he did not share the wealth with his bandmates. Although Bill was the front-cat of Billy and the Boingers, the band excluded him and disbanded when it became public that he spent his nights staying up late, reading the Bible with a nun. After this incident, Bill became the televangelist "Fundamentally Oral Bill", parodying (and, in the Bloom County universe, rivaling) real-life televangelists such as Jimmy Swaggart, Jim Bakker and Oral Roberts.

Bill was accused of treason for sending secrets to the Soviet Union with the unwitting assistance of his lover Jeane Kirkpatrick. Secrets he sold included: Secret antiperspirant, the secret formula of Coke, the secret of the Sierra Madre, and the secret of George Bush's appeal (the secret being that he does not have any appeal). He was exchanged to the Soviets for accused spy Cutter John. While in Russia, he was responsible for the Chernobyl nuclear disaster, and was traded back soon afterward. The reason he stated for returning to the US was, as he put it, "to make some dough," although this reason was edited by Milo into the more PR-friendly "to once again walk the green grass of freedom."

Bill the Cat twice won the National Radical Meadow Party's nomination to run for President of the United States, in 1984 and 1988, despite being dead in the first instance, and despite having a vocabulary that mainly consisted of "Aack!" He lost twice, once because of coughing up a fur ball on Connie Chung, not to mention several scandals, including an unauthorized biography written by Albert Goldman exposing him as a vegesexual, and a Bartles & Jaymes junkie. The second was plagued with scandals. In spite of this political affiliation, he embarked on a torrid love affair with Jeane Kirkpatrick, then was later used as the primary source for an illegal cat-sweat-based baldness cure. His brain was replaced with Donald Trump's (who had been hit with his yacht's anchor while sunbathing in New York Harbor).

Bill the Cat returned to comics in Berkeley Breathed's now canceled strip, Opus, which ran from November 23, 2003, through November 2, 2008. Given Bill's ostensible death and revival by tongue cloning (à la Sleeper), his carcass was suggested as the source of the recent BSE (aka "Mad Cow Disease") epidemic. Later, he was chosen as the new mayor of Bloom County. He got the message when he was playing Garfield at a mall promotion (the child in his lap asked her father if Garfield had died). Mayoral efforts for Bill and Opus involved forcing low-jeans teenagers to wear suspenders. Bill, however, lost an election a few months later because of an affair with Paris Hilton.

Bill the Cat currently appears on Breathed's personal Facebook page. He and Opus ran for POTUS in the 2016 election. Their primary issue was the return of "two spaces after a period." Following the 2016 election, a new Bloom County strip ran on Breathed's page which saw Opus giving a speech to Bill about the importance of staying close to family in the face of massive changes, as family was where everything stayed exactly the same. Bill responds in perfect English, "So irrevocably true."

== In other media ==
In the early 1990s, Power Girl's cat in Justice League Europe took on the mannerisms of Bill the Cat following a teleporter accident.

In the 2000 music video for "The Real Slim Shady" by Eminem, two mental hospital patients are shown fighting over a Bill the Cat plushie.

In the 2021 film The Suicide Squad, the character of Weasel, portrayed by Sean Gunn, was based on several aspects of Bill the Cat.
