= Outland (comic strip) =

1989–1995 comic strip by Berkeley Breathed

- Outland header featuring Opus the Penguin
- Author: Berkeley Breathed
- Current status/schedule: Cancelled
- Launch date: September 3, 1989
- End date: March 26, 1995
- Syndicate(s): The Washington Post Writers Group
- Genre(s): Humor, Politics, Satire
- Preceded by: Bloom County
- Followed by: Opus

Outland is a comic strip written and illustrated by Berkeley Breathed from 1989 until 1995. It was a Sunday-only spin-off of Breathed's strip Bloom County, featuring many of the same characters.

== Overview ==
On September 3, 1989, a month after retiring Bloom County, Breathed began his second syndicated strip with a minor character from the previous strip. Ronald-Ann Smith, a little girl from the "wrong side of the tracks" in Bloom County, entering a magic doorway in a grimy alley that looked down into a cheery world of "ice cream trees and lilac mountains" known as the Outland (the ground of her world did not align with that of Outland, so the door originally appears to be hovering in the sky above it).

In its earliest form, Outland had been intended to be an experimental strip for Breathed, featuring a channel for creativity in the forms of new characters (such as Mortimer Mouse, based on the rejected name for Disney's Mickey Mouse) and bizarre backgrounds (many of which initially resembled those seen in Krazy Kat). However, Opus the Penguin returned in the strip's third installment, and Bill the Cat appeared months after that. Before long, the premise of another world beyond a magic door had been lost completely.

Breathed wrote that the strip became "Bloom County without the continuing narrative that a daily appearance allows" in the first Outland book collection. Other characters from Bloom County, such as Milquetoast the Cockroach, Steve Dallas, Oliver Wendell Jones, and Michael Binkley, became major players in the strip. Some characters, such as Cutter John, made an occasional guest appearance. A few prominent members of Bloom County, such as Milo Bloom, did not make an active appearance at all (though Milo did appear in the second-to-last installment of Outland, as a background extra on a bus).

In 1991, Breathed wrote a children's Christmas book entitled A Wish for Wings That Work. The story revolved around Opus and included several Outland characters (although the Outland itself was not explicitly referenced in the story). It was made into an animated television movie that same year.

Finally, on March 26, 1995, Breathed decided to end the strip and retire from cartooning. At the strip's end, Steve Dallas came out as gay, and eloped to California with Mark Slackmeyer from the comic strip Doonesbury. Opus returned to Antarctica to live with his mother, whom he had finally located (some story arcs of the original comic Bloom County focused on his quest to find her).

Eight years later, Breathed abandoned retirement and picked up where Outland had left off. The result was the Sunday-only reunion strip, Opus.

== Recurring characters ==
- Ronald-Ann Smith
- Mortimer Mouse
- Tim W. Forty
- Opus the Penguin
- Bill the Cat
- Milquetoast the Cockroach
- Truffles the Pig
- Oliver Wendell Jones
- Michael Binkley
- Steve Dallas
- The Kiwi
- The Ducks
- The Chicken

== Reprints ==
- Politically, Fashionably, and Aerodynamically Incorrect (1992)
- His Kisses are Dreamy...but Those Hairballs Down my Cleavage...! (1994)
- One Last Little Peek, 1980-1995: The Final Strips, the Special Hits, the Inside Tips (1995)
- Outland: The Complete Library – Sunday Comics: 1989-1995 (2012)

Many Outland strips have never been reprinted in color, though all appeared in black & white in Comics Revue magazine.

Outland strips also appeared in the 2004 book Opus: 25 Years of His Sunday Best, which reprinted strips from Bloom County and the new Opus strip as well.

The whole output of Outland was collected by The Library of American Comics in their series, Bloom County: The Complete Library in 2012.
