= Bloom County =

American comic strip by Berkeley Breathed

- The cover of the first Bloom County collection
- Author: Berkeley Breathed
- Website: GoComics.com/BloomCounty (reruns)
- Current status/schedule: Running, no set schedule
- Launch date: December 8, 1980
- End date: August 6, 1989, resumed on July 13, 2015
- Alternate name(s): Bloom County 2015 (2015), The Bloom County Boys (2025)
- Syndicate(s): Washington Post Writers Group (1980–1989)
- Genre(s): Humor, Politics, Satire
- Preceded by: The Academia Waltz
- Followed by: Outland

Bloom County is an American comic strip by Berkeley Breathed. It originally ran from December 8, 1980, until August 6, 1989. It examined events in politics and culture through the viewpoint of a fanciful small town in Middle America, with a mix of human and anthropomorphic animal characters. The primary cast includes the adolescent Michael Binkley and Milo Bloom, as well as attorney Steve Dallas and Vietnam War veteran Cutter John. Animal characters include Opus the Penguin and Bill the Cat.

On July 12, 2015, Breathed started drawing Bloom County again, with new strips appearing on his Facebook site on a very irregular basis. The first revived strip was published via Facebook on July 13, 2015.

Renamed "The Bloom County Boys," the strip moved from Facebook to Patreon in 2026 where the full version is available by subscription.

Breathed won the Pulitzer Prize for Editorial Cartooning in 1987, making him only the second (and, to date, last) comic strip artist to win a Pulitzer; the other was Garry Trudeau, whose work has influenced Breathed.

== Premise ==
Breathed set Bloom County in a small town. Breathed said he made the choice because he had followed a girlfriend to Iowa City, Iowa; Breathed commented, "You draw—literally—from your life if you’re going to write anything with some juice to it. I did just that."

The fictional setting of Bloom County served as a recurring backdrop for the comic, although the nature of the setting was frequently altered. In the comics, the county is presented as a stereotypical American midwestern small town. The small town setting was frequently contrasted with the increasing globalization taking place in the rest of the world; though Bloom County contained the likes of farmers and wilderness creatures by default, it was frequented by Hare Krishnas, feminists, and rock stars.

Breathed lived in Iowa City during the early years of the strip, and the setting of Bloom County resembles Iowa City in several ways. The Bloom Boarding House, which appeared as a high contrast photo within the strip, is modeled after the Linsay House located at 935 East College Street. Several Iowa City local news items also directly inspired Bloom County story lines. For example, a fictional Ronald Reagan sexist gaffe, referring to women as "little dumplin's", was lifted from University of Iowa football coach Hayden Fry's comment, infuriating feminists at the university.

== Characters ==
Major characters (from left to right): Oliver, Opus, Binkley, Steve Dallas, Portnoy, Milo, Bill, Hodge-Podge, and Milquetoast

At the very beginning of the strip (December 1980), the central setting was the Bloom boarding house run by the grandparents of Milo Bloom. As the strip continued, various boarders moved into the boarding house. The cast features a variety of humans and anthropomorphic animals.

=== Human characters ===
- Michael Binkley: Usually referred to by his last name, he is initially introduced as a classmate of Milo Bloom, and shown to live with his father, Tom Binkley. Binkley is characterized by his high anxiety, which is frequently reflected in the form of the "anxiety closet", the closet in his bedroom from which personifications of his anxieties appear.
- Milo Bloom: An adolescent boy and the strip's original protagonist, he is initially shown to be a resident of the boarding house with his grandfather, referred to as Major. In early strips, he is characterized by his active imagination. After the boarding house element is dropped from the strip, he becomes a newspaper reporter and straight man to the others.
- Steve Dallas: Previously appearing in The Academia Waltz, he is Bloom County's sole defense attorney. A macho and irresponsible chain smoker and former "frat boy", Dallas spends most of his free time either trying to seduce women or concocting get-rich-quick schemes, including forming and managing a heavy metal band. His girlfriend Bobbi Harlow and unnamed mother have appeared in the strip as well.
- Cutter John: A wheelchair-using Vietnam War veteran, he is known for being the subject of attraction for other women in the strip, as well as for his re-enactments of Star Trek with the animal characters.
- Oliver Wendell Jones is an African-American schoolmate of Milo and Binkley. He is a young computer hacker and gifted scientist. Jones's parents also appear in the strip regularly, often to express disdain for their son's actions.

=== Animal characters ===
- Bill the Cat: Introduced in June 1982 as a parody of the comic character Garfield, he is characterized by his disheveled and mangy appearance. He is killed off in a 1983 story arc, but subsequently brought back to life as a more prominent character. From there, Bill the Cat takes on a variety of roles, including cult leader, televangelist, and heavy metal musician. In one story arc, his brain is replaced with that of Donald Trump.
- Hodge-Podge: A rabbit who is a friend of Cutter John. He is politically conservative and fanatical about various issues, despite the fact that he is extremely ignorant about those same issues.
- Opus the Penguin: An anthropomorphic penguin; while originally introduced as Binkley's pet, he is later shown to be wholly independent. He is characterized by his naive and optimistic personality, addiction to herring, and attempts to date human women. One of his recurring storylines is his attempts to locate his estranged mother. Opus later appears in Breathed's follow-up comic strips Outland and Opus, three children's books, and a television special entitled A Wish for Wings That Work.
- Portnoy is a groundhog, although his species was a mystery until October 1983. He is characterized by his grouchy personality and disdain for Opus.

== Publication history and production ==
Bloom County originated from a comic strip known as The Academia Waltz, which Breathed produced for The Daily Texan, the student newspaper of the University of Texas. The comic strip attracted the notice of the editors of The Washington Post, who recruited him to do a nationally syndicated strip. On December 8, 1980, Bloom County, syndicated by The Washington Post Writers Group, made its debut and featured some of the characters from Academia Waltz, including former frat-boy Steve Dallas and the paraplegic Vietnam War veteran Cutter John.

Breathed's award of the Pulitzer Prize in editorial cartooning in 1987 for Bloom County was controversial. Because the cartoon appeared on the comics page, and not on the editorial page, the win was disapproved of by many members of Association of American Editorial Cartoonists.

Breathed cited the controversy over the release of Go Set a Watchman as the factor that led him to resume Bloom County.

== End and spinoff strips ==
Breathed decided to end the strip in 1989. In keeping with the continuity of the Bill the Cat/Donald Trump story line, Trump "buys out" the comic strip and fires all of the cast. In the strip's final weeks the cast found new "jobs" with other comic strips. A "goodbye party" was held over the course of the week where characters talked about joining new strips. Portnoy and Hodge Podge get jobs as janitors behind the scenes at Marmaduke; Steve Dallas unsuccessfully attempts to pitch himself as a new superhero, but is quickly rejected and instead finds a bit part in Cathy; Michael Binkley becomes a wild boar skinner for Prince Valiant. Lola Granola accepts an invitation to pose for Playboy. Milo Bloom is seen with a snake swallowing him head first and informing Opus he would be appearing Tuesdays in The Far Side. Oliver Wendell Jones is seen with the distinct features of Family Circus characters. He informs Opus he is being "bussed in" to the strip as part of a court order. Once Bloom County characters are scattered, only Opus is left as part of a plot to transition to Breathed's next strip in Bloom County's final week.

Shortly after Bloom County ended, Breathed started a Sunday-only strip called Outland with original characters and situations introduced in Bloom County's final days. However, Opus, Bill and other characters eventually reappeared and slowly took over the strip. Outland ran from September 3, 1989, to March 26, 1995. Another Sunday-only spinoff strip called Opus ran from November 23, 2003, to November 2, 2008.

== Return ==
On July 12, 2015, Breathed posted to his Facebook page a photo with the caption "A return after 25 years. Feels like going home." The photo showed him drawing a comic strip with the title Bloom County 2015 with Opus pictured in the first frame. A fan asked in the comments on the picture if this was in response to Donald Trump's presidential campaign; Breathed responded, "This creator can't precisely deny that the chap you mention had nothing to do with it." The next day, July 13, 2015, the first comic of the revived strip was officially posted online, also to Breathed's Facebook page. The strip was relaunched under the Bloom County 2015 title, only to be renamed simply as Bloom County at the start of 2016.

On the return of the strips Breathed stated:

Deadlines and dead-tree media took the fun out of a daily craft that was only meant to be fun. I had planned to return to Bloom County in 2001, but the sullied air sucked the oxygen from my kind of whimsy. Bush and Cheney's fake war dropped it for a decade like a bullet to the head. But silliness suddenly seems safe now. Trump's merely a sparkling symptom of a renewed national ridiculousness. We're back baby.

Breathed originally had no plans of publishing the new strips outside of his Facebook page, commenting that “Newspapers need deadlines, alas. Like my departed friend Douglas Adams used to say, the only part of deadlines I enjoyed was the whooshing sound as they sped by.” An archive of the new strips ultimately did launch on GoComics, but has not been updated since June 8, 2020. A new book was announced in June 2016; Bloom County Episode XI: A New Hope was a compilation of strips from 2015 and 2016. Two more books followed in 2017 and 2018, respectively. No more books have been published since.

On April 11, 2022, Breathed posted a new strip on Facebook labeled "Season 33, Episode 3" in the title panel. It featured Steve Dallas and Opus in a satire of the MeToo Movement.

New installments of the strip have been released far more sporadically in recent years. In 2023, Breathed only created seven daily strips released between July 23rd and August 13th and did not release any at all for 2024.

Breathed started posting strips more regularly again on July 9, 2025, beginning with a series where Opus is targeted by ICE for overstaying a tourist visa he got when he initially appeared in Bloom County.

Publication of the strip, retitled The Bloom County Boys, was moved to Patreon in early 2026. The full strip is available as a subscription service.

Starting from 2016, Breathed took on, with permission, the characters from Calvin and Hobbes in an occasional series of strips.

== Animated series ==
On February 15, 2022, it was announced that a Bloom County television series was in development at Fox, with Berkeley Breathed as executive producer and co-writer. Bento Box would serve as the animation studio on the project. Fox's animation company, Bento Box Entertainment, Miramax, Spyglass Media Group and Project X Entertainment were all working on it as an animated series. In September 2022, it was announced The Simpsons writer Tim Long joined the series as showrunner.

On August 31, 2025, the official Bloom County Facebook page stated that development on the series had been cancelled shortly after the 2024 presidential election, just as the pilot was about to enter production. No explanation was given by Fox for the decision.

== Bloom County books ==
Like many other popular comic strips, Bloom County has been republished in various collections. By 2004, the comic strip was reprinted in 11 books, the first having been published in 1983 and the last in that year. None of the reprints contained complete runs of the strip, although Bloom County Babylon contained many of the strips that preceded Loose Tails. All of the daily strips have been reprinted in Comics Revue magazine.

IDW Publishing published The Bloom County Library, a five volume hardback collection of all Bloom County strips, beginning in October 2009. This series is part of their Library of American Comics series. It is a complete reprint of the strip, including side notes about cultural and political references made in the strip, "Headlines" breaks to identify the top stories of the day, and commentary from Breathed. Each volume has three separate releases: a standard edition, a signed edition, and a signed, remarked edition. Breathed said that the reason why the strips printed in The Bloom County Library were not published in previous collections was that the publisher would not let Breathed publish 400 pages each year, so Breathed had to reduce the content in each book. Breathed also said that he believes that, "I just closed my eyes and dropped a dart on the ones to be included." He felt relieved the publishers did not "have to ask ... to do this again."

On October 25, 2017, IDW published Bloom County: Real, Classy, & Compleat: 1980–1989, collecting the complete run of Bloom County in two volumes. An "Ultimate Collectors Set" was also released, including the original art from a daily strip featuring Opus, a page from Breathed's sketchbooks, and a personalized sketch of Opus on the slipcover.

=== Collections ===
- Loose Tails (1983)
- Toons for Our Times (1984)
- Penguin Dreams and Stranger Things (1985)
- Bloom County Babylon: Five Years of Basic Naughtiness (1986)—An omnibus featuring strips from the previous three collections, early strips from 1980 to 1981 and most of those released in 1985 (unavailable in other collections)
- Billy and the Boingers Bootleg (1987)
- Tales Too Ticklish to Tell (1988)
- The Night of the Mary Kay Commandos (1989)
- Happy Trails! (1990)
- Classics of Western Literature (1990)—An omnibus featuring strips from the previous four collections with a sampler of Academia Waltz strips
- One Last Little Peek, 1980–1995: The Final Strips, the Special Hits, the Inside Tips (1995)—A collection of strips from bonus Bloom County and Outland reprints with commentary by Breathed
- Opus: 25 Years of His Sunday Best (2004)—An omnibus featuring strips from Bloom County, Outland, and Opus
- Bloom County Episode XI: A New Hope (2016)
- Bloom County: The Real, Classy, & Compleat 1980–1989 (2017)
- Bloom County Brand Spanking New Day (2017)
- Bloom County Best Read on the Throne (2018)

=== The Complete Bloom County Library ===
Bloom County: The Complete Library, published by The Library of American Comics, an imprint of IDW Publishing, between 2009 and 2012. Collects the complete Bloom County as well as Outland and Opus.
