= Berkeley Breathed =

American cartoonist and author (born 1957)

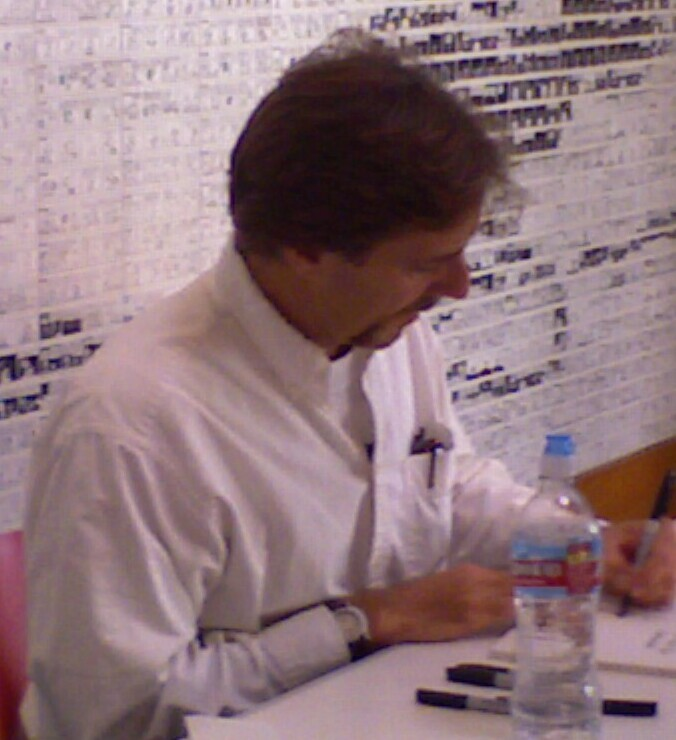
- Breathed in 2008
- Born: Guy Berkeley Breathed; June 21, 1957 (age 69) Los Angeles, California, U.S.
- Areas: Cartoonist, illustrator, writer
- Pseudonym: Berke
- Notable works: Bloom County comic strip (1980–1989, 2015–present); Outland Sunday strip (1989–1995); Opus Sunday strip (2003–2008).
- Awards: Pulitzer Prize – For editorial cartooning 1987

Guy Berkeley "Berke" Breathed (/ˈbrɛθɪd/; born June 21, 1957) is an American cartoonist, children's book author, director, and screenwriter, known for his comic strips Bloom County, Outland, and Opus. Bloom County earned Breathed the Pulitzer Prize for Editorial Cartooning in 1987.

== Early life ==
Born in Los Angeles, but raised in Houston, Texas, Breathed attended Westchester High School in Houston. He is of Norwegian and Ulster Scots ancestry.

== Cartooning career ==
Breathed was first published when he was hired part-time by the Austin American-Statesman to draw editorial cartoons for the newspaper. This job was short-lived; he was dismissed shortly after one of his cartoons (about a busing order imposed on the local school system) caused outrage. His first comic strip published regularly was The Academia Waltz, which appeared in the Daily Texan, in 1978 while he was a student at the University of Texas. During his time at the University of Texas, Breathed self-published two collections of The Academia Waltz, using the profits to pay his tuition. The comic strip attracted the notice of the editors of The Washington Post, who recruited him to do a nationally syndicated strip.

On December 8, 1980, Bloom County made its debut. It featured some of the characters from Academia Waltz, including former frat-boy Steve Dallas and the paraplegic Vietnam War veteran Cutter John. At its start, the strip's style was so similar to that of another popular strip, Doonesbury, that Doonesbury's creator Garry Trudeau wrote to Breathed several times to indicate their similarities. Breathed has acknowledged that he borrowed liberally from Doonesbury during his early career. In the Outland collection One Last Little Peek, Breathed even put an early Bloom County side by side with the Doonesbury comic strip from which it obviously took its idea.

Bloom County earned Breathed the Pulitzer Prize for editorial cartooning during 1987. The strip eventually appeared in over 1,200 newspapers around the world until Breathed retired the daily strip in 1989, stating that he wanted to terminate the strip while it was still popular. At that time, he said, "A good comic strip is no more eternal than a ripe melon. The ugly truth is that in most cases, comics age less gracefully than their creators".

Breathed replaced the strip with the surreal Sunday-only cartoon Outland in 1989, which reused some of the Bloom County characters, including Opus the Penguin and Bill the Cat. He ended Outland in 1995.

In 2003, Breathed began the comic strip Opus, a Sunday-only strip featuring Opus the Penguin, who was one of the main characters of Bloom County.

Several newspapers chose not to run the August 26, 2007, Opus cartoon because it might offend Muslims.

On October 6, 2008, Breathed announced plans to discontinue all work on comic strips with the final Opus strip to run on November 2, 2008. Breathed planned to focus on writing children's books. Breathed explained that he felt that the United States was going to face "tough times", and that he wanted to end the saga of his most memorable character "on a lighter note".

The last Opus comic strip appeared on schedule, but in what may be a comic first, the final panel required an online link. The final panel of the strip showed Opus sleeping peacefully in the bed depicted in the classic children's book, Goodnight Moon. This panel was available only online, and the Humane Society of the United States page that displayed it was later removed.

Breathed said that he had no regrets in leaving political cartooning, as he believed the atmosphere became too bitter for him to make quality cartoons.

In July 2015 Breathed hinted at a return to the strip when he posted a photo to Facebook of him at his computer, starting a cartoon entitled "Bloom County 2015". He added: "A return after 25 years. Feels like going home." The strip was later posted to Facebook. He subsequently began posting new Bloom County strips via Facebook, on an almost-daily basis by January 2018; the strip later became sporadic in frequency, sometimes going months between posts. (In 2016, "2015" was dropped from the new strip's name.)

In 2021, Breathed penned a series of strips featuring characters from Bill Watterson's Calvin and Hobbes. Panels featured Watterson's Calvin as Spaceman Spiff and Hobbes the Tiger.

On July 10, 2025, Breathed started a new strip entitled Bloom County Boys. It first appeared on his Bloom County Facebook page, then moved to Patreon.

== Other works ==
Breathed's syndicated and Facebook cartoon work has produced at least thirteen cartoon anthology books, as of January 2018. Starting in 1992, he designed a greeting card and gift ensemble collection for American Greetings, featuring the "Bloom County" characters Opus, Bill the Cat, and Milquetoast the Cockroach.

As of January 2018, Breathed has produced ten children's picture books. Two were made into the animated films: A Wish for Wings That Work (Amblin Television/Universal Cartoon Studios, 1991) and Edwurd Fudwupper Fibbed Big (Nickelodeon Movies, 2000); one was made into the motion-capture film Mars Needs Moms (Disney, 2011). Another animated film; Hitpig!, which Breathed himself loosely adapted from his book Pete and Pickles, was produced by Aniventure, and released in 2024.

Breathed's writing has also been featured in numerous publications, including Life, Boating, and Travel and Leisure. He produced the cartoon art for the closing credits of the Texas-based 2003 film Secondhand Lions, which featured a strip called Walter and Jasmine. The panels that Breathed drew for Secondhand Lions appear in his cartoon anthology book Opus: 25 Years of His Sunday Best, in which Breathed terms them "the comic strip that never was".

Breathed has been a supporter of the animal rights group PETA and illustrated the cover of earlier printings of PETA's cookbook The Compassionate Cook, or, "Please Don't Eat the Animals!", T-shirts, and other merchandise.

Breathed cameos as himself in the 2004 short film Tim Warner: A Life in the Clouds, a fictional tale about an unhappy cartoonist and his unfunny strip, The Silver Lining.

== Personal life ==
Breathed is a fan of outdoor activities such as powerboating and motorcycling. In 1986, he broke his back in an ultralight-plane crash, later incorporated into a Bloom County storyline in which Steve Dallas breaks his back after being attacked by an angry Sean Penn. Breathed also nearly lost his right arm to a boating accident.

Breathed has said that he is an atheist, yet he does not fear death more than "sharing a room in a detox center with a sobbing Rush Limbaugh".

On May 18, 2008, in his comic strip Opus, Breathed announced he was suffering from a condition known as spasmodic torticollis.

In December 2021 he put his Santa Barbara home on the market.

== Bibliography ==
Cartoon compilations

- The Academia Waltz, Sterling Swift, 1979, ISBN 978-0-88408-122-7
- The Academia Waltz: Bowing Out, Bantan Hall, 1980
- Loose Tails, Little, Brown & Co., 1983, ISBN 978-0-31610-710-5
- Toons for Our Times, Little, Brown & Co., 1984
- Penguin Dreams and Stranger Things, Little, Brown & Co., 1985, ISBN 978-0-31610-725-9
- Bloom County Babylon: Five Years of Basic Naughtiness, Little, Brown & Co., 1986, ISBN 978-0-31610-309-1
- Billy and the Boingers Bootleg, Little, Brown & Co., 1987, ISBN 978-0-31610-729-7. Contained a flexi-disc featuring two songs by Billy and the Boingers
- Tales Too Ticklish to Tell, Little, Brown & Co., 1988, ISBN 978-0-31610-735-8
- The Night of the Mary Kay Commandos, Little, Brown & Co., 1989, ISBN 978-0-31610-738-9
- Classics of Western Literature: Bloom County 1986–1989, Little, Brown & Co., 1990, ISBN 978-0-31610-754-9
- Happy Trails, Little, Brown & Co., 1990, ISBN 978-0-316-10741-9
- Politically, Fashionably, and Aerodynamically Incorrect, Little, Brown & Co., 1992, ISBN 978-0-316-10701-3
- His Kisses Are Dreamy but Those Hairballs Down My Cleavage!, Little, Brown & Co., 1994, ISBN 978-0-31610-867-6
- One Last Little Peek, Little, Brown & Co., 1995, ISBN 978-0-31610-690-0
- Opus, 25 Years, Little, Brown & Co., 2004, ISBN 978-0-31615-994-4
- Bloom County: The Complete Library: Volume One: 1980–1982, IDW Publishing, 2009, ISBN 978-1-60010-531-9
- Bloom County: The Complete Library: Volume Two: 1982–1984, IDW Publishing, 2010, ISBN 978-1-60010-583-8
- Bloom County: The Complete Library: Volume Three: 1984–1986, IDW Publishing, 2010, ISBN 978-1-60010-755-9
- Bloom County: The Complete Library: Volume Four: 1986–1987, IDW Publishing, 2011, ISBN 978-1-60010-899-0
- Bloom County: The Complete Library: Volume Five: 1987–1989, IDW Publishing, 2011, ISBN 978-1-61377-061-0
- Outland: The Complete Library: Sunday Comics: 1989–1995, IDW Publishing, 2012, ISBN 978-1-61377-176-1
- Opus: The Complete Library: Sunday Comics: 2003–2008, IDW Publishing, 2012, ISBN 978-1-61377-408-3
- Berkeleyworks: The Art of Berkeley Breathed: From Bloom County and Beyond, IDW Publishing, 2013, ISBN 978-1-61377-651-3
- Berkeley Breathed's Academia Waltz and Other Profound Transgressions, IDW Publishing, 2015, ISBN 978-1-63140-076-6
- Bloom County Episode XI: A New Hope, IDW Publishing, 2016, ISBN 978-1631406997
- Bloom County: Brand Spanking New Day, IDW Publishing, 2017, ISBN 978-1684050970
- Bloom County: Best Read on the Throne, IDW Publishing, 2018, ISBN 978-1684053148

Children's books

- A Wish for Wings That Work: An Opus Christmas Story, Little, Brown and Co., 1991, ISBN 978-0316107587
- The Last Basselope: One Ferocious Story, Little, Brown and Co., 1992, ISBN 978-0316107617
- Goodnight Opus, Little, Brown and Co., 1993, ISBN 978-0316108539
- Red Ranger Came Calling, Little, Brown and Co., 1994, ISBN 978-0316102490
- Edwurd Fudwupper Fibbed Big, Little, Brown and Co., 2000, ISBN 978-0316144254
- Flawed Dogs: The Year End Leftovers at the Piddleton "Last Chance" Dog Pound, Little, Brown and Co., 2003, ISBN 978-0316713597
  - Breathed said that Flawed Dogs's intended audience is different from the intended audiences of his other picture books. He said that Flawed Dogs would be "perfect" for 8–12 year olds, but that he would not read the book to his (in 2009) 5-year-old son.
- Mars Needs Moms!, Philomel Books, 2007, ISBN 978-0399247361 (adapted into the film Mars Needs Moms! released in 2011)
- Pete & Pickles, Philomel Books, 2008, ISBN 978-0399250828
- Flawed Dogs: The Shocking Raid on Westminster, Philomel Books, 2009, ISBN 978-0399252181
- The Bill the Cat Story: A Bloom County Epic, Philomel Books, 2016, ISBN 978-0399546624

== Awards ==
- Inkpot Award, 2010
- Pulitzer Prize for Editorial Cartooning, 1987
- Golden Duck Award for Excellence in Children's Science Fiction for Mars Needs Moms! 2008 Picture Book
