= Popeye & Bluto's Bilge-Rat Barges =

Attraction at Islands of Adventure

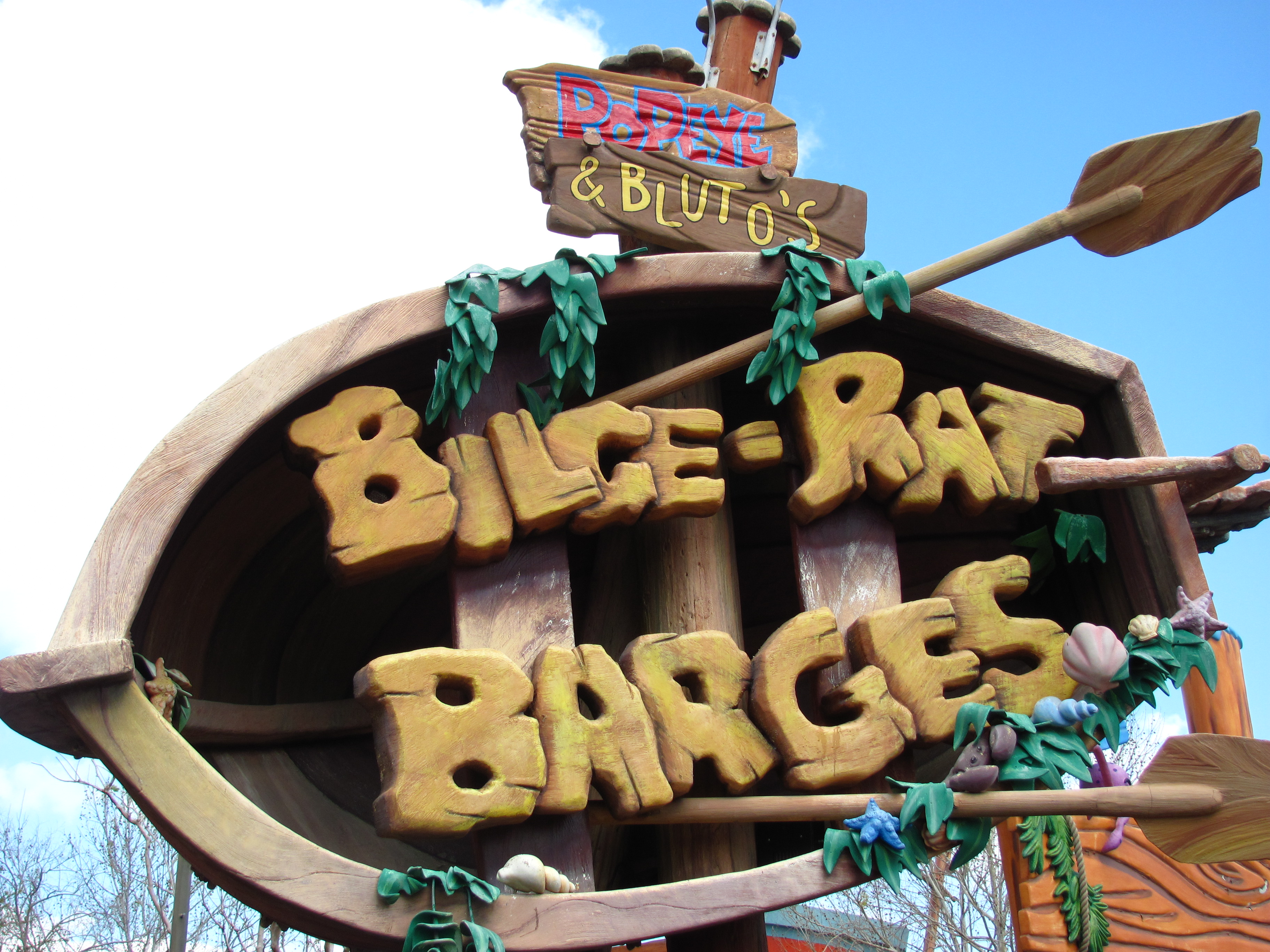
- The sign at the ride’s queue entrance.

Universal Islands of Adventure
- Area: Toon Lagoon
- Status: Operating
- Opening date: May 28, 1999

General statistics
- Type: River rafting ride
- Manufacturer: Barr Engineering
- Speed: 11 mph (18 km/h)
- Duration: 6 minutes
- Height restriction: 42 in (107 cm)
- Capacity: 12 per raft
- Theme: Popeye
- Universal Express available
- Single rider line available

Popeye & Bluto's Bilge-Rat Barges is a river rafting ride at Islands of Adventure in Orlando, Florida, inspired by the character Popeye created by cartoonist Elzie Crisler Segar. Opened on May 28, 1999, it is one of the park's original attractions and was the first river rafting ride Universal constructed in its parks.

== History ==
Initial plans for what would become Islands of Adventure featured an entire park themed to cartoon-based intellectual properties that was to be named "Cartoon World". The park plans contained a section called "Popeye's Island", which was split into two subsections, "Sweethaven Village", themed after the town of the same name featured in the 1980 live-action film Popeye, and "The Docks".

Two rides were planned for Popeye's Island. Sweethaven Village was to feature an indoor boat ride called "Popeye's Adventure", while the Docks was to feature a rafting ride called "Bluto's Bilge-Rat Barges". When Cartoon World was redeveloped into Islands of Adventure, Popeye's Adventure was scrapped, with Bluto's Bilge-Rat Barges being re-themed to feature both characters.

== Queue area ==
The attraction's queue emulates that of a ferry, with dock pilings placed along the pathway in the outdoor portions. Early on, guests pass a sign welcoming them to "Popeye's Paradise Cruises", but as they approach the boat load, they find that the entrance is closed off. This leads to a detour into a queue building for “Bluto's Bilge-Rat Barges”, setting up the main story of the ride.

== Operations ==
The attraction experiences an average queue time of 15 minutes throughout the year. Like all primarily outdoor attractions at Universal Orlando, it is closed when there is a risk of thunderstorms or during other severe weather events. The attraction, along with the other water ride in the park, Dudley Do-Right's Ripsaw Falls, is typically closed during the colder months of the year, often from mid February to mid March, for maintenance and refurbishments.

=== Incidents ===
During the morning of February 12, 2021, a fire broke out along one of the ride's channels, with a thick plume of smoke visibly rising from the attraction. The attraction was closed at the time for its annual winter refurbishment, and no guests or workers were harmed in the incident. It was later revealed that the fire was the result of a construction worker overfilling the fuel tank for an external pump that was being used to remove water from the channels. The fire caused minimal damage and the ride finished its refurbishment, returning to standard operation on February 20, 2021.

== Voice cast ==
- Popeye the Sailor Man: Keith Scott
- Bluto: Keith Scott
- Olive Oyl: Sandy Fox

== Gallery ==
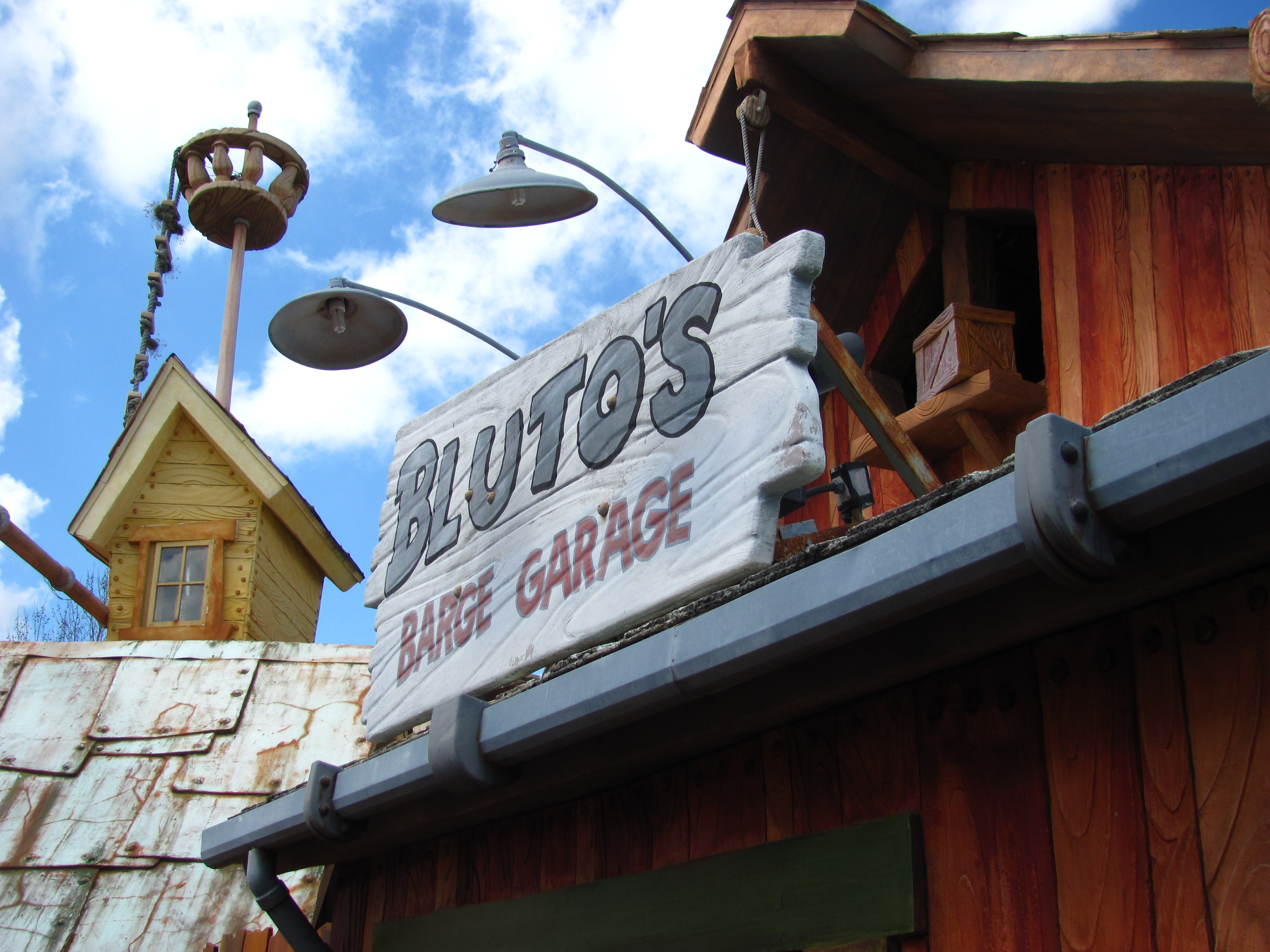

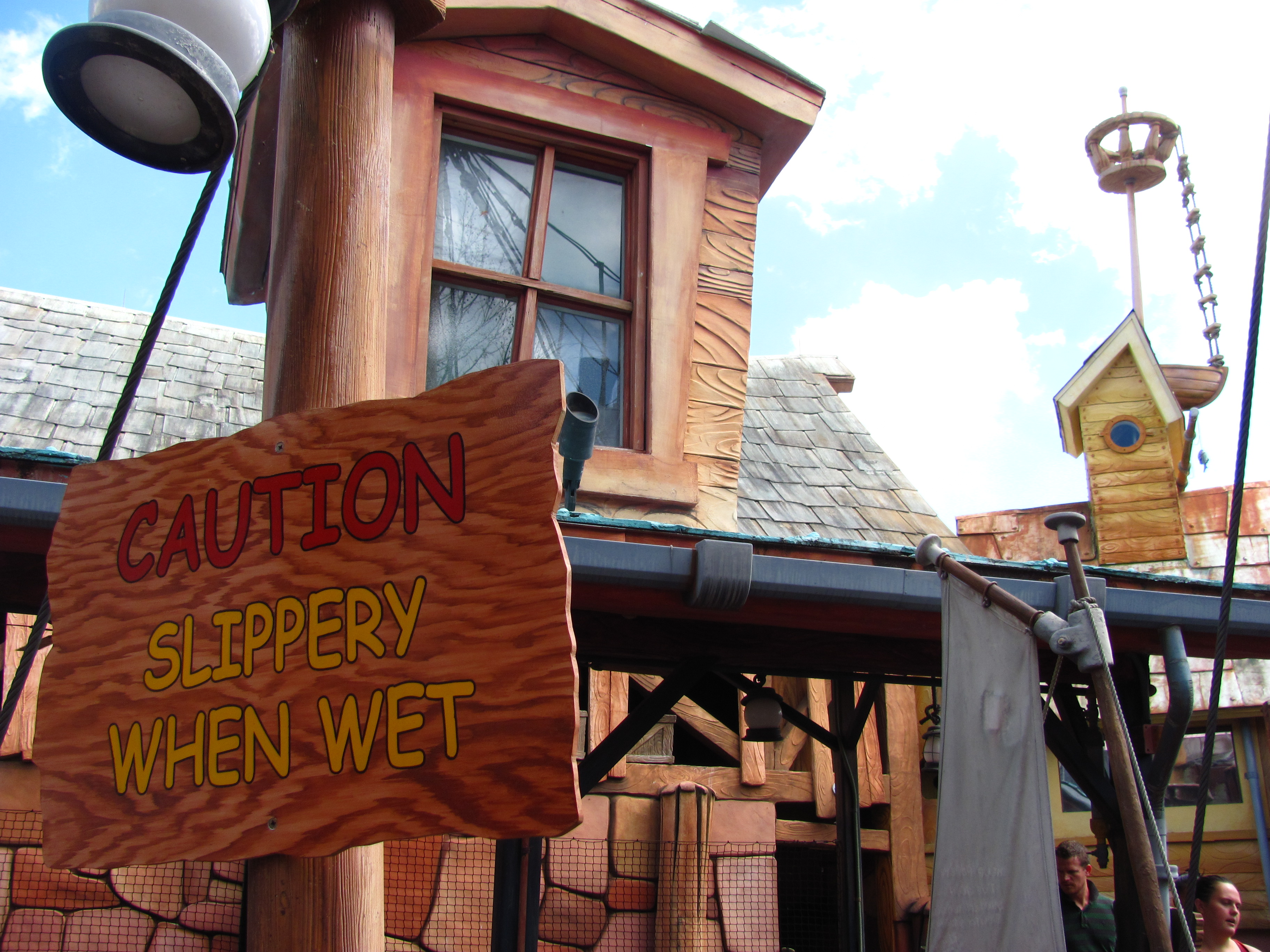

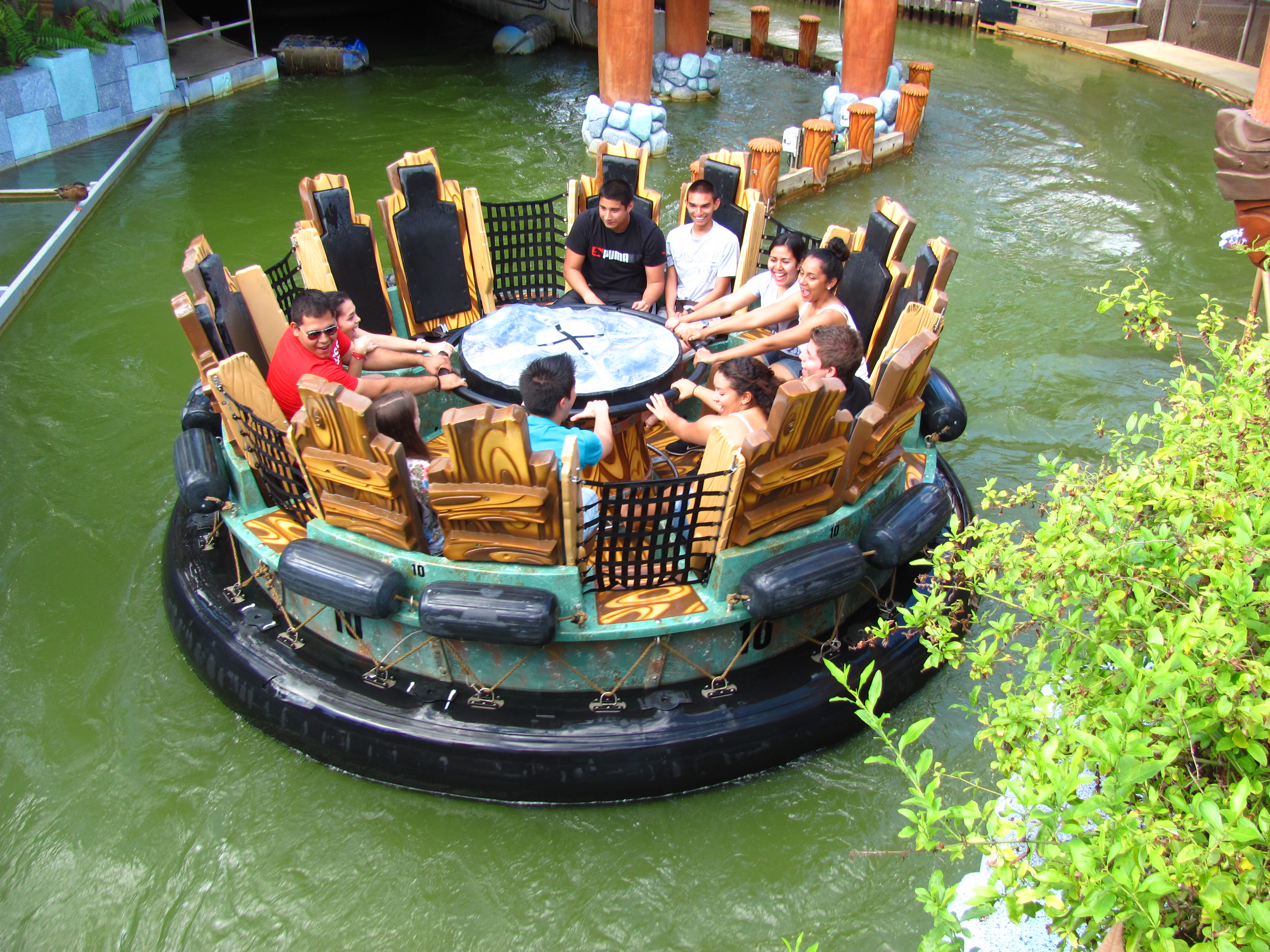

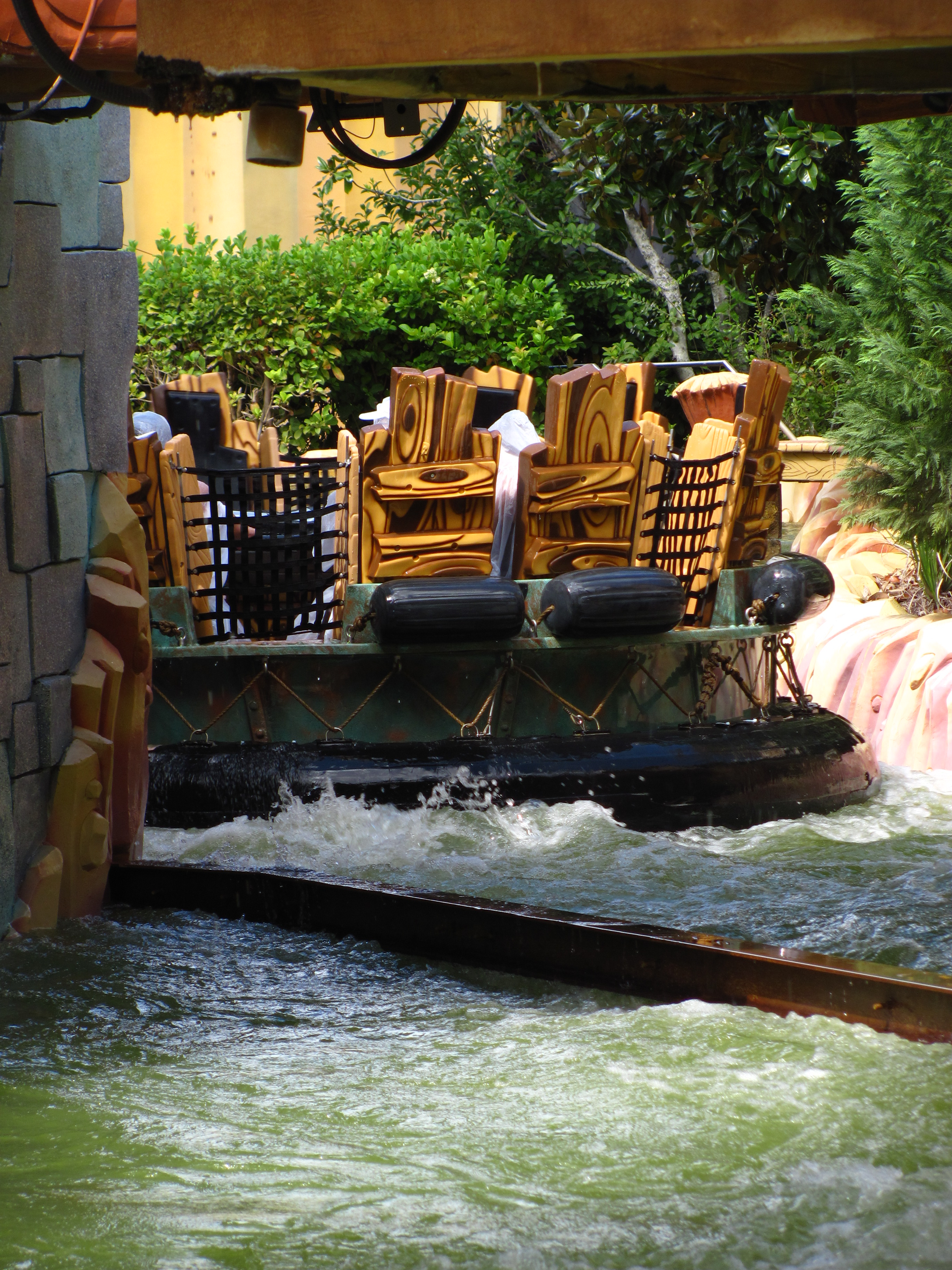

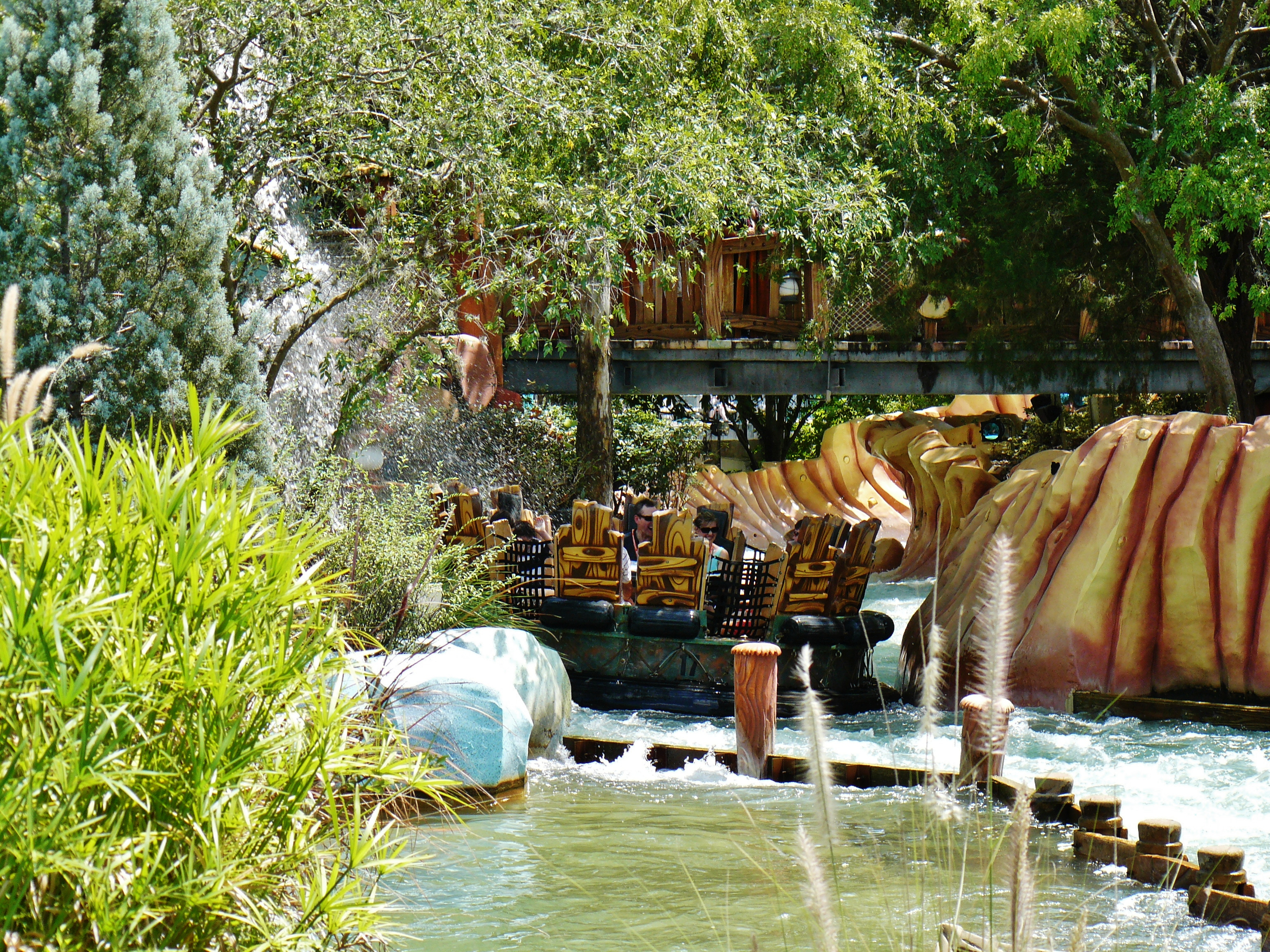
