= Bud Sagendorf =

American cartoonist (1915–1994)

- Born: Forrest Cowles Sagendorf; March 22, 1915; Wenatchee, Washington, U.S.
- Died: September 22, 1994 (aged 79); Sun City, Florida, U.S.
- Occupation: Cartoonist
- Known for: Thimble Theatre Starring Popeye

Forrest Cowles Sagendorf (March 22, 1915 – September 22, 1994), better known as Bud Sagendorf, was an American cartoonist, notable for his work on King Features Syndicate's Thimble Theatre Starring Popeye comic strip.

== Personal life ==
Born in Wenatchee, Washington, Sagendorf was three years old when his father died. He arrived at age three in Santa Monica, California, with his sister Helen and his mother, who opened a beauty parlor. It was Helen who gave him the nickname "Bud". His first job was as a newsboy, selling the Los Angeles Herald-Express on the street.

In 1940, he married his high school sweetheart, Nadia Crandall, and they eventually moved to rural Connecticut.

== Career ==
He began his cartoon career while a teenager, working for $50 a week as the assistant of cartoonist E. C. Segar on his Thimble Theatre and Sappo comic strips. Following Segar's death in 1938, Sagendorf moved to New York and began illustrating marketing materials for King Features, while also developing Popeye toys and games.

=== Thimble Theatre ===
From 1948 to 1967, Sagendorf was the writer-artist of the ongoing Popeye comic book across three different publishers (Dell, Gold Key, and King Comics). In 1959, he finally assumed command of the Thimble Theatre comic strip.

In 1964, he explained his working methods:

Any part of my work can be interrupted for something important like golf or bowling. There are about 20 syndicated cartoonists living in my area, and they all enjoy dragging a fellow comic artist away from his drawing board. I hate to admit it, but I’m a deadline worker and do my best when my back is against the wall. In respect to ideas, I don’t buy gags; I do them myself… with the help of my family. My son, Brad, is developing into a great idea man. I made the mistake of paying him for an idea once, and he quickly lost his amateur standing. I do not like to write out a complete daily continuity too far in advance. When I have a continuity idea, I blab an outline into a small tape recorder and file it away until I’m ready for it. The day-to-day strips are done on a weekly basis. I feel that too-tight writing holds me down, and I lose the spontaneous ideas that always pop up when I’m working. As for my background, I started drawing at an early age because it was easier to make pictures than to learn to spell. I was born in Wenatchee, Washington. While I was still in high school I went to work for the late E. C. Segar, the creator of Popeye. I saw the birth of many wonderful characters: Swee’-pea, Eugene the Jeep, Alice the Goon and Poop-deck Pappy. In recent years I have added Granny and Betty Beasky. After Segar’s death in 1938, I was asked by King Features to continue the strip. Except for a period as an assistant comic editor, I have been doing the daily and Sunday Popeye ever since.

A year after those remarks, he talked on television about Popeye when he appeared on What's My Line? (December 5, 1965).

He continued the strip until 1986. Wanting to spend more time with his family and confronted with failing eyesight, Sagendorf reduced his output to Sunday strips while Bobby London continued with the Popeye dailies. Sagendorf wrote and drew the Popeye Sunday strips until his death. King Features continues to run reprints of Sagendorf's daily strips, while R. K. Milholland writes and draws new Sunday strips.

== Death ==
Sagendorf was 79 years old when he died in Sun City, Florida, on September 22, 1994, from brain cancer. He was survived by his wife, two sons and a daughter.

In 2011, Craig Yoe wrote a biographical profile of Sagendorf and collected a selection of his outstanding comic book stories in Popeye: The Great Comic Book Tales by Bud Sagendorf.

== Bibliography ==
- Sagendorf, Bud. Popeye. Treasure Books, 1955.
- Sagendorf, Bud. Popeye: The First Fifty Years. Workman, 1979.
