= Popeye the Sailor (radio series) =

Popeye 1935 radio series

- Other names: Popeye
- Genre: Superhero fiction; Action/Radio comedy
- Running time: 15 min
- Country of origin: United States
- Language: English
- Home station: WEAF, WABC
- Recording studio: New York
- Original release: September 10, 1935 – July 29, 1938
- Sponsored by: Wheatena, Popsicle

Popeye the Sailor is a radio serial that originally aired from 1935 to 1938 featuring characters from the King Features comic strip Thimble Theatre.

== History ==
After the success of the 1933 Popeye the Sailor film series, NBC approached King Features about producing a radio serial in February 1934 but had trouble securing an agreement. After delays, NBC announced the series would premiere on September 10, 1935, as a three-times-a-week 15-minute show broadcast from WEAF at 7:15pm.

The serial was sponsored by Wheatena, who paid $1,200 a week for the plug, but threatened legal action two weeks before the series premiere when it discovered King Features had sold the window display rights to IGA who was using Popeye to market competing cereals.

Instead of eating spinach as in the film series, Popeye gained his power boost from eating four bowls of Wheatena. In early episodes, Popeye sang a variation on "I'm Popeye The Sailor Man" that went:

I'm Popeye the Sailor Man

I'm Popeye the pride o' the sea

Wheatena's my diet,

I ax you ta try it

And get big and husky like me

But in later episodes, a radio announcer instead spoke the words: "Wheatena's his diet, he asks you to try it, with Popeye the Sailor Man."

After the first 13-week run, Wheatena threatened to end the show over King Features' deal with IGA, but ultimately renewed for another 13-week run beginning December 10, 1935, with Popeye voice actor Detmar Poppen was replaced by Floyd Buckley.

Popeye the Sailor returned for second season that began on August 31, 1936, moving from NBC to CBS. Wheatena cut the season short opting not to renew it for another 13-week block after Feb. 28, with Radio Daily speculating it was due to an "unusually mild winter" and Wheatena being a hot cereal, plus the high asking price for the license from King Features which had gone up to $2,000 for the second season, and was going to go up to $2,500 for the third season.

Production of a third season was delayed until Popsicle signed on as the new sponsor in December 1937. When the series returned on May 2, 1938, it starred an entirely different voice cast, for unknown reasons. The third season ended on July 29, 1938. An ad soliciting for spot advertisers for a fourth season ran in trade magazine Broadcasting on December 15, 1939, but nothing came of it.

== Cast ==
The main cast consisted of four characters: Popeye, Olive Oyl, Wimpy, and a newsboy Popeye adopts who is initially called "Sonny" and later "Matey." The latter was replaced in the third season by a new character named Captain Dick who had a racist caricature for a Chinese servant.

Seasons 1 & 2 sponsored by Wheatena (1935–1937):

- Detmar Poppen / Floyd Buckley as Popeye
- Olive LaMoy as Olive Oyl
- Charles Lawrence as Wimpy
- Jimmy Donnelly as Sonny/Matey

Season 3 sponsored by Popsicle (1937–1938):

- Don Costello as Popeye
- Jean Roy as Olive Oyl
- Everett Sloane as Wimpy
- Jay Jostyn as Captain Dick

== Reception ==
In January 1935, Popeye the Sailor was listened to on 12.2 percent of U.S. radios. In January 1936, it was listened to on 10.2 percent of U.S. radios. The second season ranked number two in Best Children's Program in the First Annual Hearts Newspaper Radio Editors Poll, and number four in Children's Program in the Annual Radio Guide Popularity Poll.

Variety called the first season's early episodes "sloppily written" and the sound design "poorly conceived." Newsweek wondered whether children might "begin to doubt their hero's integrity" due to the "shameless about-face" of switching from spinach to Wheatena.

Variety was more positive of the second-season premiere, stating: "There is every reason to suppose Popeye as now paced, directed, musically backgrounded and put together by [orchestra leader Victor] Irwin will wrap itself up a large and devoted following."

Of the third-season premiere, Variety was critical of the show replacing the previous cast and orchestra, declaring the change "for the worse." The reviewer disliked that Popeye's voice was only "mildly similar" to the cartoons, Olive Oyl and Wimpy were "noticeably off the sound track" and "production is non-evident."
