= Harry Foster Welch =

American actor

- Born: Harold Foster Welch; November 27, 1893; Annapolis, Maryland, U.S.
- Died: August 16, 1973 (aged 79); Blowing Rock, North Carolina, U.S.
- Other name: Harry Welch
- Occupation: Actor
- Years active: 1915–1968

Harry Foster Welch (November 27, 1893 – August 16, 1973) was an American radio and voice actor, best known for providing the voice of Popeye in cartoons and portraying the character in live performances beginning in 1934.
