= Popeye: Rush for Spinach =

2005 video game

- North American cover art.
- Developer: Magic Pockets
- Publishers: NA: Namco Hometek; EU: Atari Europe
- Composer: Frédéric Motte
- Platform: Game Boy Advance
- Release: NA: April 19, 2005; FRA: June 23, 2006
- Genres: Racing, platform
- Modes: Single-player, multiplayer

Popeye: Rush for Spinach is a Game Boy Advance video game based on the comic strip of same name created by E. C. Segar, licensed from King Features Entertainment. It was developed by French studio Magic Pockets and published by Namco Hometek in 2005, and Atari Europe in 2006.

== Plot ==
The evil Sea Hag has taken the world supply of spinach, and it's up to Popeye, Olive Oyl, Bluto, and Wimpy to travel through time and space to put an end to her plans.

== Gameplay ==
- Adventure: Compete in a series of races with a storyline.
- Challenge: Compete against each character on each level
- Quick Rush: Race on one level.
- Time Rush: Race alone against the clock.
- Team Rush: Compete with a human opponent.

== Reception ==
Reception

Aggregate score
Aggregator	Score
Metacritic	48/100

Popeye: Rush for Spinach received negative reviews.
