= George W. Geezil =

Publication information
- Publisher: King Features Syndicate
- First appearance: Thimble Theatre (1932)
- Created by: E. C. Segar

In-story information
- Notable aliases: Mr. Geezer, Mr. Geezle, George G. Geezil

George W. Geezil, also known as simply Geezil, is a comic strip character created by E. C. Segar for his strip Thimble Theatre (now Popeye) in 1932.

== Comics ==
Geezil made his first handful of appearances in the strips in 1932, as an unnamed patron in Roughhouse's cafe. He re-appeared in December 1933 as a more prominent recurring figure, now consistently a Russian-accented cobbler (later pawn shop owner) and regular customer of Rough-House who harbored a strong dislike for J. Wellington Wimpy, although until his fifth appearance he went unnamed.

Over time, he was named Mr. Geezer, Mr. Geezle, George G. Geezil, eventually settling as George W. Geezil by his 33rd appearance, in 1935.

Geezil is a tall, bald, gangly man dressed all in black, wearing a black derby hat. He wears glasses, and most distinctively, a long, wild, tangly black beard. He often talks in a choppy, disjointed and flustered manner, via recurring mannerisms such as did you asking me? and could I have stood it?.

Geezil's loathing for Wimpy grew and soon became his defining character trait, and Geezil is not shy about telling the portly scamster how he feels about him. Wimpy, for his part, seems to largely ignore Geezil's hostility—although he has often subtly retaliated by flustering and confusing Geezil. Geezil's most frequent and intense declarations of loathing for Wimpy included "he is flies in my soup", "I hate you to pieces!" and that Wimpy should "be killed to death!"

== Other appearances ==
Geezil made a handful of appearances in the Popeye cartoons, including A Clean Shaven Man (1936, nonspeaking role), Olive's Boithday Presink (1941), and Wimpy the Moocher (1960).

In the 1980 Popeye film, Geezil was a greengrocer who was constantly arguing with Wimpy, but the two maintained a shaky friendship (at one point, he comments "Phooey! The Commodore! Next to Wimpy, I hate him best!"). Geezil was played here by Richard Libertini.
