= Popeye =

Comic and cartoon character

Popeye the Sailor Man
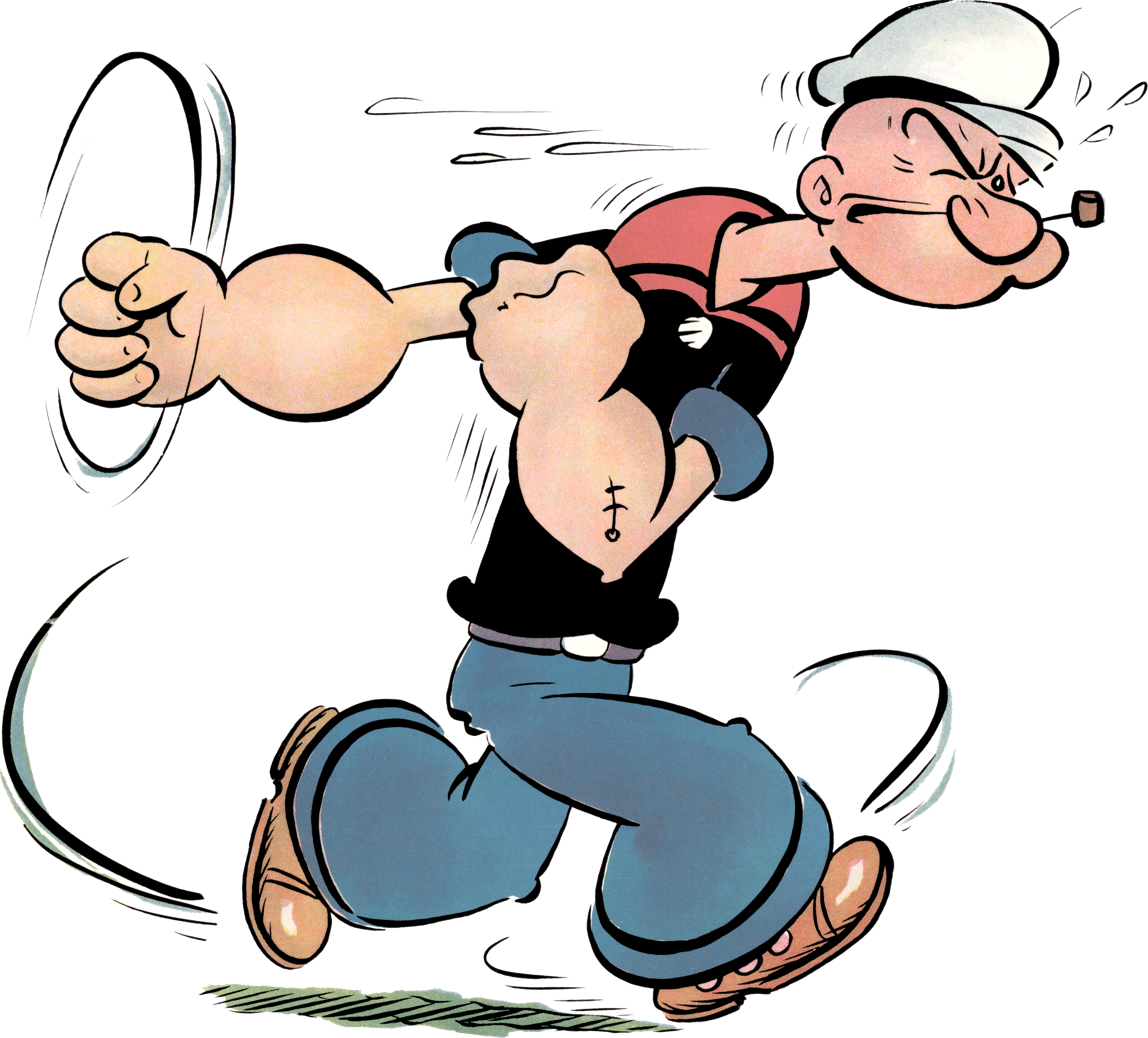

Publication information
- Publisher: King Features Syndicate
- First appearance: Thimble Theatre (1929)
- Created by: E. C. Segar
- Voiced by: Voice actor: William Costello (1933–1935); Jack Mercer (1934–1945, 1947–1984); Floyd Buckley (1936–1937 radio appearances, 1937 Bluebird Records records, 1945–1946 cartoons); Harry Foster Welch (1946–1947, 1960s Peter Pan Records records); Mae Questel (1945–1946; cartoons); Candy Candido (I'm Popeye the Sailor Man/The Little White Duck); Allen Swift (Official TV Popeye Record Album, Popeye's Favorite Sea Shanties, Start commercial); Maurice LaMarche (1987–1990); Jeff Bergman (1989–1996, commercials); Wally Wingert (Popeye and the Quest For the Woolly Mammoth, Popeye: The Rescue, Popeye and the Sunken Treasure); Billy West (Minute Maid commercial, Popeye's Voyage: The Quest for Pappy, Drawn Together, Bank of America commercial); Tom Kenny (2014 animation test); Joe Newton (Popeye's Island Adventures)

In-story information
- Partnerships: Olive Oyl (girlfriend)
- Supporting character of: Sons: Swee'Pea; Popeye Junior; Family: Granny (paternal grandmother); Patcheye (great-grandfather); Aunt Jones (aunt); Poopdeck Pappy (father); Pipeye, Peepeye, Poopeye and Pupeye (nephews)

Popeye the Sailor Man is a cartoon character created by Elzie Crisler Segar, first appearing on January 17, 1929, in the daily King Features comic strip Thimble Theater. The strip was in its tenth year when Popeye made his debut, but the one-eyed sailor quickly became the lead character, and Thimble Theater became one of King Features' most popular properties during the early 1930s. Popeye became the suitor of longtime Thimble Theater star Olive Oyl, and Segar introduced new supporting characters such as adopted son Swee'Pea and friend J. Wellington Wimpy, as well as foes like the Sea Hag and Bluto.

Following Segar's death in 1938, Thimble Theater (later renamed Popeye) was continued by several writers and artists, most notably Segar's assistant Bud Sagendorf. The strip continues to appear in first-run installments on Sundays, written and drawn by R. K. Milholland. The daily strips are reprints of old Sagendorf stories.

In 1933, Max Fleischer adapted the Thimble Theater characters into a series of Popeye the Sailor theatrical cartoon shorts for Paramount Pictures. These cartoons proved to be among the most popular of the 1930s, and Fleischer Studios, which later became Paramount's own Famous Studios, continued production through 1957. Cartoons produced during World War II included Allied propaganda, as was common among cartoons of the time.

Over the years, Popeye has also appeared in comic books, television cartoons, video games, hundreds of advertisements, peripheral products ranging from spinach to candy cigarettes, and the 1980 live-action film directed by Robert Altman and starring Robin Williams as Popeye. In 2002, TV Guide ranked Popeye number 20 on its "50 Greatest Cartoon Characters of All Time" list. Charles M. Schulz said, "I think Popeye was a perfect comic strip, consistent in drawing and humor."

== Inspiration ==
The person believed to have inspired Popeye was Polish-born Frank "Rocky" Fiegel, a tough laborer from Chester, Illinois, who was always getting into fights. Some say he was a professional boxer. However, he also gave out candy and treats to children, including E.C. Segar, who remembered Fiegel when he created Popeye. Fiegel was described as "just like the fictional spinach-loving mariner ... a one-eyed, pipe-smoking curmudgeon with a jutting chin."

== Fictional character and story ==
Popeye's story and characterization vary depending on the medium. In his debut storyline, Popeye already appeared to have superhuman endurance, being shot sixteen times in all by the storyline's villain, taking the first fifteen shots before collapsing visibly wounded and crawling away to hide. His improbable survival was augmented by the "luck" he acquired by rubbing the feathers of the head of Bernice, a magical "whiffle hen" owned by Olive Oyl's brother Castor during the storyline, which enabled him to survive the gunshot wounds for a few days until he reemerged, shrugged off another shot and knocked the villain out. The next few strips had him feeling faint and thinking he was dying of blood loss despite the whiffle hen's conferred luck, but for reasons of comedy he had completely recovered by the next strip. By the end of 1929, superhuman strength was a regular fixture of his character, in 1931 first attributed to spinach. In Segar's comic strip, Popeye's superhuman strength and near-invulnerability were permanent: only on some occasions would he need to eat additional spinach to boost his strength. It was Fleischer Studios' cartoon series that made Popeye eat a can of spinach whenever he needed to increase his strength to superhuman levels. Swee'Pea is Popeye's ward in the comic strips, but his custody is inconsistent in cartoons.

There is no absolute sense of continuity in the stories, although certain plot and presentation elements remain mostly constant, including purposeful contradictions in Popeye's capabilities. Popeye seems bereft of manners and uneducated, yet he often comes up with solutions to problems that seem insurmountable to the police or the scientific community. He has displayed Sherlock Holmes-like investigative prowess, scientific ingenuity, and successful diplomatic arguments. Over time, the character has evolved, with the use of tobacco notably reduced in modern depictions. In the animated cartoons his pipe also proves to be highly versatile. Among other things, it has served as a cutting torch, jet engine, propeller, periscope, musical instrument, and a whistle with which he produces his trademark toot. He also eats spinach through his pipe, sometimes sucking in the can along with the contents. Since the 1970s, Popeye is seldom depicted using his pipe to smoke tobacco.

Popeye's exploits are also enhanced by a few recurring plot elements. The cartoons introduced the love triangle between Popeye, Olive Oyl, and Bluto (sometimes called Brutus), and Bluto's endless machinations to claim Olive at Popeye's expense. Another plot element is Popeye's near-saintly perseverance in overcoming any obstacle to please Olive.

== Comics ==
=== Thimble Theatre and Popeye comic strips ===
Thimble Theatre / Popeye
- Author(s): E. C. Segar (creator, December 1919 – December 1937, May–August 1938); Doc Winner (December 1937–May 1938); Tom Sims & Doc Winner (August 1938 – December 1939); Bela Zaboly & Tom Sims (December 1939 – December 1954 (daily strip), December 1939 – September 1959 (Sunday strip)); Bela Zaboly & Ralph Stein (December 1954 – August 1959, daily strip only); Bud Sagendorf (August 1959 – February 1986 (daily strip), September 1959 – September 1994 (Sunday strip)); Bobby London (February 1986 – July 1992, daily strip only); Hy Eisman (September 1994 – May 2022, Sunday strip only); R. K. Milholland (June 2022 – present, Sunday strip only)
- Website: popeye.com comicskingdom.com/popeye
- Current status/schedule: New strips on Sundays, reprints Monday through Saturday
- Launch date: December 19, 1919; 106 years ago
- End date: July 30, 1992 (last first-run daily strip, Sunday strips continue)
- Syndicate: King Features Syndicate
- Publisher: King Features Syndicate
- Genre(s): Humor, adventure

Segar's Thimble Theatre debuted in the New York Journal on December 19, 1919. The paper's owner, William Randolph Hearst, also owned King Features Syndicate, which syndicated the strip. Thimble Theatre was intended as one of several Hearst-commissioned replacements for Midget Movies by Ed Wheelan (Wheelan having recently resigned from King Features). While initially failing to attract a large audience, the strip nonetheless increasingly accumulated a modest following as the 1920s continued. At the end of its first decade, the strip resultantly appeared in over a dozen newspapers and had acquired a corresponding Sunday strip (which had debuted on January 25, 1925, within the Hearst-owned New York American paper).

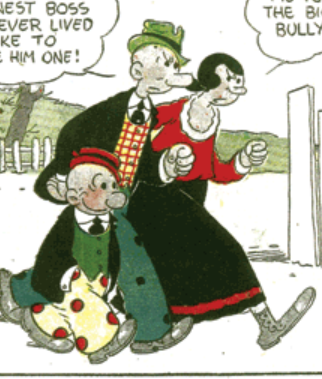
The original cast of "Thimble Theatre" in a 1925 Sunday strip. Left to right: Castor Oyl, Ham Gravy and Olive Oyl

Thimble Theatre's first main characters were the lanky, long-nosed slacker Harold Hamgravy (rapidly shortened to simply "Ham Gravy") and his scrappy, headstrong girlfriend Olive Oyl. In its earliest weeks, the strip featured the duo, alongside a rotating cast of primarily one-shot characters, acting out various stories and scenarios in a parodic theatrical style (hence the strip's name). As its first year progressed, however, numerous elements of this premise were abandoned (including the recurring character "Willie Wormwood", introduced as a parody of melodrama villainy), soon rendering the strip a series of episodic comic anecdotes depicting the daily life and dysfunctional romantic exploits of Ham Gravy and Olive Oyl. It could be classified as a gag-a-day comic during this period.

In mid-1922, Segar began to increasingly engage in lengthier (often months-long) storylines; by the end of the following year, the strip had effectively changed fully into a comedy-adventure style focusing on Ham, Olive, and Olive's ambitious-but-myopic diminutive brother Castor Oyl, initially a minor character yet arguably the protagonist of the strip by 1925. Castor and Olive's parents Cole and Nana Oyl also made frequent appearances beginning in the mid-1920s. By the late 1920s, the strip had likewise acquired a number of notable characters beyond the sphere of Ham Gravy and the Oyl family, including Castor Oyl's wife Cylinda (to whom he was married from 1926 to 1928), her wealthy, misanthropic father Mr. Lotts and Castor's fighting cockerel Blizzard, all of whom had exited the strip by the close of 1928 (although Cylinda eventually maritally reunited with Castor under R. K. Milholland's authorship almost a century later).

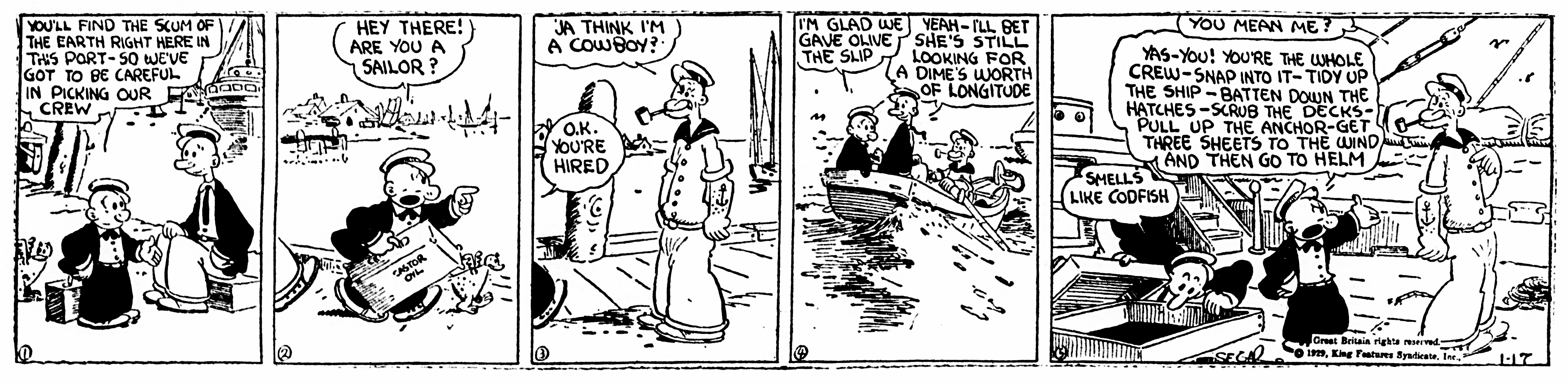
Popeye in his first appearance

Popeye first appeared in the strip on January 17, 1929, as a minor character. He was initially hired by Castor Oyl and Ham Gravy to crew a ship for a voyage to Dice Island, the location of a casino owned by the crooked gambler Fadewell. Castor intended to break the bank at the casino using the unbeatable good luck conferred by stroking the head feathers of Bernice the Whiffle Hen. Weeks later, on the trip back, Popeye was shot many times by Jack Snork, an undercover stooge of Fadewell's, but survived by rubbing Bernice's head. After the adventure's conclusion in June, Popeye left the strip, but, owing to reader reaction, he was brought back after an absence of only five weeks.

Ultimately, the Popeye character became so popular that he was given a larger role by the following year, and the strip was taken up by many more newspapers as a result. Initial strips presented Olive as being less than impressed with Popeye, but she eventually left Ham to become Popeye's girlfriend in March 1930, precipitating Ham's exit as a regular weeks later. Over the years, however, she has often displayed a fickle attitude towards the sailor. Initially, Castor Oyl continued to come up with get-rich-quick schemes and enlisted Popeye in his misadventures. By the end of 1931, however, he settled down as a detective and later on bought a ranch out west. Castor's appearances resultantly became sparser over time. As Castor faded from the strip, J. Wellington Wimpy, a soft-spoken and eloquent yet cowardly hamburger-loving moocher who would "gladly pay you Tuesday for a hamburger today" was introduced into the Sunday strip, in which he became a fixture by late 1932. After first appearing in the daily strip in March 1933, Wimpy became a full-time major character alongside Popeye and Olive.

Thimble Theatre was renamed Thimble Theatre Starring Popeye in 1931. It was eventually renamed simply Popeye, the name under which the strip continues to run.

In July 1933, Popeye received a foundling baby in the mail whom he adopted and named Swee'Pea. Other regular characters introduced into the strip following its retool in 1930 were George W. Geezil, an irascible cobbler who spoke in a heavily affected accent and habitually attempted to murder or wish death upon Wimpy; Rough-House, the temperamental owner of a budget diner who served as a long-suffering foil to Wimpy; Eugene the Jeep, a yellow, vaguely doglike animal from Africa with magical powers; the Sea Hag, a terrible pirate and the last witch on Earth; Alice the Goon, a monstrous creature who entered the strip as the Sea Hag's henchwoman and continued as Swee'Pea's babysitter; the hapless, perpetually anxious King Blozo; Blozo's unintelligent lackey Oscar; Popeye's lecherous, scheming father Poopdeck Pappy; and Toar, an ageless, dim-witted caveman.

Segar's strip was quite different from the theatrical cartoons that followed. The stories were more complex (often spanning months or even years), with a heavier emphasis on verbal comedy and many characters that never appeared in the cartoons (among them King Blozo, Toar, and Rough-House). Spinach usage, a trait introduced in July 1931, was comparatively infrequent, and Bluto appeared in only one story arc. Segar signed some of his early Popeye comic strips with a cigar, his last name being a homophone of "cigar" (pronounced SEE-gar). Comics historian Brian Walker stated: "Segar offered up a masterful blend of comedy, fantasy, satire and suspense in Thimble Theater Starring Popeye".

Owing to Popeye's increasingly high profile, Thimble Theatre became one of King Features' most popular strips during the 1930s. A poll of adult comic strip readers in the April 1937 issue of Fortune magazine voted Popeye their second-favorite comic strip (after Little Orphan Annie). By 1938, Thimble Theatre was running in 500 newspapers, and over 600 licensed "Popeye" products were on sale. The success of the strip meant Segar was earning $100,000 a year at the time of his death. The strip continued after Segar's death in 1938 under a succession of artists and writers. Following an eventual name change to Popeye in the 1970s and the cancellation of the daily strip in 1992 (in favor of reprints), the comic, now solely a Sunday strip, remains one of the longest-running strips in syndication today.

==== Toppers ====
Thimble Theatre had a number of topper strips on the Sunday page during its run; the main topper, Sappo, ran for 21 years, from February 28, 1926, to May 18, 1947. (Sappo was a revival of an earlier Segar daily strip called The Five-Fifteen, aka Sappo the Commuter, which ran from December 24, 1920, to February 17, 1925.) For seven weeks in 1936, Segar replaced Sappo with Pete and Pansy – For Kids Only (Sep 27 – November 8, 1936).

There were also a series of topper panel strips that ran next to Sappo. Segar drew one of them, Popeye's Cartoon Club (April 8, 1934 – May 5, 1935). The rest were produced by Joe Musial and Bud Sagendorf: Wiggle Line Movie (September 11 – November 13, 1938), Wimpy's Zoo's Who (November 20, 1938 – December 1, 1940), Play-Store (December 8, 1940 – July 18, 1943), Popeye's Army and Navy (July 25 – September 12, 1943), Pinup Jeep (September 19, 1943 - April 2, 1944), and Me Life by Popeye (April 9, 1944-?).

==== Artists after Segar ====
Tom Sims and Bill Zaboly's Thimble Theatre (December 2, 1951)

Following Segar's illness and eventual death in 1938 (with his final Thimble Theatre strip appearing October 2 of that year), numerous people were hired to draw and write the strip. Tom Sims, the son of a Coosa River channel-boat captain, acted as the writer for Thimble Theatre beginning in August 1938 and established the Popeye the Sailorman spin-off. Doc Winner, who had previously filled in for Segar between January and May 1938, initially acted as Sims' artist, with Bela Zaboly succeeding him by December 1939. In 1954, Sims ceded writing duties on the daily strip to Ralph Stein, who continued to collaborate with Zaboly until both the daily and Sunday strips were taken over by Bud Sagendorf in 1959.

Sagendorf wrote and drew the daily strip until 1986, and he continued to write and draw the Sunday strip until his death in 1994. Sagendorf, who had been Segar's assistant, made a definite effort to retain much of Segar's classic style, although his art is instantly discernible. Sagendorf continued to use many obscure characters from the Segar years, especially O. G. Wotasnozzle and King Blozo. Sagendorf's new characters, such as the Thung, also had a very Segar-like quality. What set Sagendorf apart from Segar more than anything else was his sense of pacing. Where plotlines moved very quickly with Segar, it sometimes took an entire week of Sagendorf's daily strips for the plot to be advanced even a small amount.

From 1986 to 1992, the daily strip was written and drawn by Bobby London, who, after some controversy, was fired from the strip for a story that could be taken to satirize abortion. London's strips put Popeye and his friends in updated situations, but kept the spirit of Segar's original. One classic storyline, titled "The Return of Bluto", showed the sailor battling every version of the bearded bully from the comic strip, comic books, and animated films. The Sunday edition of the comic strip was drawn by Hy Eisman from 1994 to 2022. Following Eisman's retirement, the Sunday strip was taken over by R. K. Milholland, who had previously contributed Popeye cartoons to the web-only feature Popeye's Cartoon Club in 2019 and 2020. The daily strip has featured reruns of Sagendorf's strips since London's firing.

==== Copyright expiration ====
According to a 1992 case in Japan, Popeye's copyright expired in May 1990 in the country. On January 1, 2009, 70 years since the death of his creator, Segar's comic strips (though not the various films, TV shows, theme music, and other media based on them) became public domain in most countries, but remained under copyright in the United States because works published before 1978 in the United States that complied with all copyright formalities are protected for 95 years from publication.

On January 1, 2025, the Thimble Theatre strip that introduced Popeye entered the public domain. It was believed that certain elements of Popeye's character such as eating spinach as a source of strength would not yet be in the public domain. However, it was found that the strips in which this aspect, as well as later characters like Bluto and J. Wellington Wimpy, were introduced did not have their copyright renewed, which was required to get the full 95-year term of protection. King Features only renewed the strip Popeye debuted in alongside one from 1930, placing all of the pre-May 4, 1933 strips into the public domain. Even after Popeye's debut strips entered the public domain, King Features still retains trademarks regarding Popeye's name and image. Unlike copyright, trademarks do not expire unless they cease to be used, and King Features has used the Popeye trademark continuously since registering it in 1931.

=== Comic books ===
Bud Sagendorf's cover of Popeye #50 (Oct.–Dec. 1959) shows Popeye with his corncob pipe, single good eye and girlfriend Olive Oyl.

There have been a number of Popeye comic books, with his main series running continuously from 1948 to 1984 published in turn by Dell Comics, Gold Key Comics, King Comics, Charlton Comics, and back to Gold Key. The series was originally written and illustrated by Bud Sagendorf. In the series, Popeye became something of a crimefighter, thwarting evil organizations and Bluto's criminal activities. The new villains included the numerous Misermite dwarfs, who were all identical.

Popeye appeared in the British TV Comic, becoming the cover story in 1960 with stories written and drawn by "Chick" Henderson. Bluto was referred to as Brutus and was Popeye's only nemesis throughout the entire run.

A variety of artists have created Popeye comic book stories since then; for example, George Wildman drew Popeye stories for Charlton Comics from 1969 until the late 1970s. The Gold Key series was illustrated by Wildman and scripted by Bill Pearson, with some issues written by Nick Cuti.

Popeye comics were also produced outside the United States, as Popeye and his supporting cast of characters were licensed to foreign publishers. In Japan, Popeye had his own manga series published by Shōnen Gahōsha, written and drawn by Robotan and Marude Dameo creator Kenji Morita, which ran from 1961 to 1965. In Italy, Editoriale Metro produced Popeye comic books aimed at the European market, with some characters changed and others added, from 1963 to 1994.

In 1988, Ocean Comics released the Popeye Special written by Ron Fortier with art by Ben Dunn. The story presented Popeye's origin story, including his given name of "Ugly Kidd" and attempted to tell more of a lighthearted adventure story as opposed to using typical comic strip style humor. The story also featured a more realistic art style and was edited by Bill Pearson, who also lettered and inked the story as well as the front cover. A second issue, by the same creative team, followed in 1988. The second issue introduced the idea that Bluto and Brutus were actually twin brothers and not the same person, an idea also used in the comic strip on December 28, 2008, and April 5, 2009. In 1999, to celebrate Popeye's 70th anniversary, Ocean Comics revisited the franchise with a one-shot comic book, The Wedding of Popeye and Olive Oyl, written by Peter David. The comic book brought together a large portion of the casts of both the comic strip and the animated shorts, and Popeye and Olive Oyl were finally wed after decades of courtship. However, this marriage has not been reflected in all media since the comic was published.

In 2012, writer Roger Langridge teamed with cartoonists Bruce Ozella, Ken Wheaton, and Tom Neely (among others) to revive the spirit of Segar in a 12-issue comic book miniseries published by IDW Publishing. Critic PS Hayes in reviewing the series stated:

Langridge writes a story with a lot of dialogue (compared to your average comic book) and it's all necessary, funny, and entertaining. Bruce Ozella draws the perfect Popeye. Not only Popeye, but Popeye's whole world. Everything looks like it should, cartoony and goofy. Plus, he brings an unusual amount of detail to something that doesn't really need it. You'll swear that you're looking at an old Whitman Comics issue of Popeye, only it's better. Ozella is a great storyteller and even though the issue is jam packed with dialog, the panels never look cramped at all.

In late 2012, IDW began reprinting the original 1940s–1950s Sagendorf Popeye comic books under the title of Classic Popeye.

In November 2022, the publication of a new manga-inspired series called Eye Lie Popeye by Marcus Williams was announced, the series was published in 2024 by Massive Publishing.

=== Webcomics ===
In January 2019, in celebration of its 90 years of character, King Feature Syndicate launched the webcomic Popeye's Cartoon Club. In a series of Sunday-format comics, a wide assortment of artists depicted the characters in their own styles in one comic each, including Alex Hallatt, Erica Henderson, Tom Neely, Roger Langridge, Lar deSouza, Robert Sikoryak, Jeffrey Brown, Jim Engel, Liniers, Jay Fosgitt, Carol Lay, and Randy Milholland. At the end of the year, Milholland's Cartoon Club comic was declared the number one comic of the year on King Features' website, Comics Kingdom.

From February through April 2020, Cartoon Club ran an additional five comics by Milholland, which was followed by an extended run from May 28 through July 6, 2020, making Milholland the first person to write a daily-update Popeye comic for King Features since 1992.

In August 2022, a new twice-weekly (Tuesdays and Thursdays) webcomic titled Olive & Popeye debuted. Milholland writes and draws the Thursday strips, which focus on Popeye and his extended family, while Tuesday strips focus on Olive and her own adventures. These were initially drawn by Shadia Amin, who was later replaced by Emi Burdge in October 2023. The two storylines run in parallel and occasionally intersect.

== Thimble Theatre/Popeye characters ==
=== Characters originating in comic strips by E. C. Segar ===
The modern depiction of Popeye.

- Popeye the Sailor (introduced January 17, 1929)
- Olive Oyl (introduced December 19, 1919)
- Swee'Pea (Popeye's adopted baby son in the comics, Olive's cousin in the cartoons) (introduced July 24, 1933)
- J. Wellington Wimpy (introduced May 3, 1931)
- Bluto/Brutus (introduced September 12, 1932)
- Eugene the Jeep (introduced March 17, 1936)
- The Sea Hag (introduced January 6, 1930)
- The Sea Hag's vultures, including her favorite, Bernard
- Alice the Goon (introduced December 10, 1933) and the other Goons
- Rough House (a cook who runs a local restaurant, the Rough House) (introduced May 24, 1931)
- George W. Geezil (the local cobbler who hates Wimpy) (introduced November 11, 1932)
- Ham Gravy (full name Harold Hamgravy, Olive Oyl's original boyfriend) (introduced December 19, 1919)
- Castor Oyl (Olive Oyl's brother) (introduced January 14, 1920)
- Cole Oyl (Olive Oyl's father)
- Nana Oyl (Olive Oyl's mother)
- Poopdeck Pappy (Popeye's 99-year-old long-lost father; also a sailor) (introduced September 26, 1936)
- Professor O. G. Watasnozzle (a character with a large nose, as his name indicates)

=== Characters originating in the cartoons ===
- Peepeye, Poopeye, Pupeye and Pipeye (Popeye's identical nephews in the Fleischer Studio shorts)
- Shorty (Popeye's shipmate in three World War II-era Famous Studios shorts)
- Popeye Jr. (son of Popeye and Olive Oyl, exclusive of the series Popeye and Son)
- Tank (son of Bluto, exclusive of the series Popeye and Son)

== Other media ==
The success of Popeye as a comic-strip has led to appearances in many other forms of media starting with animation.

=== Portrayals ===
- Billy Costello (1933–1935)
- Harry Foster Welch (1934–1940s, 1946–1947, 1960s; public events and amusement parks, Pleasure Island, cartoons, Peter Pan Records records)
- Jack Mercer (1934–1945, 1947–1984)
- Poley McClintock (1935; Beware of Barnacle Bill)
- Detmar Poppen (1935–1936; Popeye the Sailor radio show)
- Floyd Buckley (1936–1937, 1945–1946; Popeye the Sailor radio show, Bluebird Records records, cartoons)
- Hamp Howard (1939; additional lines in Wotta Nitemare)
- Mae Questel (1945–1946; cartoons)
- Candy Candido (1951; I'm Popeye the Sailor Man/The Little White Duck)
- Allen Swift (1956, 1959, 1960s–1970s; Official TV Popeye Record Album, Popeye's Favorite Sea Shanties, Start commercials)
- Tetsuo Nishihama (1978; Popeye the Sailorman/Olive and Bluto's Race Song)
- Robin Williams (1980; Popeye)
- Keith Scott (1982, 1997, 1999; Popeye commercial, Popeye & Bluto's Bilge-Rat Barges, Pandemonium Cartoon Circus)
- Maurice LaMarche (1987–1990; Popeye and Son)
- Tex Brashear (1987; Cocoa Puffs commercials)
- Jeff Bergman (1989–1996; commercials)
- Víctor Laplace (1992; Popeye y Olivia)
- Sonny Melendrez (1994–2004; Dickinson Theatres commercials)
- Tim Kitzrow (1994; Popeye Saves the Earth)
- Wally Wingert (1997–1998; Popeye and the Quest For the Woolly Mammoth, Popeye: The Rescue, Popeye and the Sunken Treasure)
- Geertjan Hessing (1997; "I'm Popeye The Sailor Man" cover)
- Frank Caruso (1998; Popeye Untold pitch pilots)
- Scott Innes (1999, 2022; Campbell's commercial, Cellular One commercial)
- Billy West (2001, 2004, 2006, 2014; Minute Maid commercial, Popeye's Voyage: The Quest for Pappy, Drawn Together, Bank of America commercial)
- Marc Biagi (2002; Slots from Bally Gaming)
- Richard Halpern (2004; Boop-Oop-a-Dooin')
- Allen Enlow (2006; United States Power Squadrons radio spots)
- Tom Kenny (2014; animation test)
- Matt Hurwitz (2018, 2023; Project Runway All Stars, World of Warships)
- Joe Newton (2018; Popeye's Island Adventures)
- Satoshi Ohno (2020; Ajinomoto commercials)

=== Animation ===
==== Theatrical animated shorts ====
In November 1932, King Features signed an agreement with Fleischer Studios to have Popeye and the other Thimble Theatre characters begin appearing in a series of animated cartoons released by Paramount Pictures. The first cartoon in the series was released in 1933, and Popeye cartoons remained a staple of Paramount's release schedule for nearly 25 years. Billy Costello was the original voice of Popeye, a voice that was replicated by later performers, such as Jack Mercer and even Mae Questel. Many of the Thimble Theatre characters, including Wimpy, Poopdeck Pappy, and Eugene the Jeep, eventually made appearances in the Paramount cartoons, though Olive Oyl's extended family and Ham Gravy were absent. Thanks to the animated-short series, Popeye became even more of a sensation than he had been in comic strips, and by 1938, polls showed that the sailor was Hollywood's most popular cartoon character.

Although Segar used spinach as a prop a few times, it was Max Fleischer who realized its potential as a trademark. In almost every Popeye cartoon, the sailor is invariably put into what seems like a hopeless situation, upon which (usually after a beating), a can of spinach becomes available, and Popeye quickly opens the can and consumes its contents. Upon swallowing the spinach, Popeye's physical strength immediately becomes superhuman, and he is easily able to save the day, and very often rescue Olive Oyl from a dire situation. It did not stop there, as spinach could also give Popeye the skills and powers he needed, as in The Man on the Flying Trapeze, where it gave him acrobatic skills. This cartoon, incidentally, was the only appearance of Olive Oyl's mother, Nana.

In May 1942, Paramount Pictures assumed ownership of Fleischer Studios, fired the Fleischers and began reorganizing the studio, which they renamed Famous Studios. The early Famous-era shorts were often World War II-themed, featuring Popeye fighting Nazi Germans and Japanese soldiers, most notably the 1942 short You're a Sap, Mr. Jap. In late 1943, the Popeye series began to be produced in Technicolor, beginning with Her Honor the Mare. Famous/Paramount continued producing the Popeye series until 1957, with Spooky Swabs being the last of the 125 Famous shorts in the series. Paramount then sold the Popeye film catalog to Associated Artists Productions, which was bought out by United Artists in 1958. Through various mergers, the rights are currently controlled by Skydance Corporation.

In 2001, Cartoon Network, under the supervision of animation historian Jerry Beck, created a new incarnation of The Popeye Show. The show aired the Fleischer and Famous Studios Popeye shorts in versions approximating their original theatrical releases by editing copies of the original opening and closing credits (taken or recreated from various sources) onto the beginnings and ends of each cartoon, or in some cases, in their complete, uncut original theatrical versions direct from such prints that originally contained the front-and-end Paramount credits. The series aired 135 Popeye shorts over 45 episodes, until March 2004. The Popeye Show continued to air on Cartoon Network's spin-off network Boomerang.

While many of the Paramount Popeye cartoons remained unavailable on video, a handful of those cartoons had fallen into public domain and were found on numerous low budget VHS tapes and later DVDs. When Turner Entertainment acquired the cartoons in 1986, a long and laborious legal struggle with King Features kept the majority of the original Popeye shorts from official video releases for more than 20 years. King Features instead opted to release a DVD boxed set of the 1960s made-for-television Popeye the Sailor cartoons, to which it retained the rights, in 2004. In the meantime, home video rights to the Associated Artists Productions library were transferred from CBS/Fox Video to MGM/UA Home Video in 1986, and eventually to Warner Home Video in 1999. In 2006, Warner Home Video announced it would release all of the Popeye cartoons produced for theatrical release between 1933 and 1957 on DVD, restored and uncut. Three volumes were released between 2007 and 2008, covering all of the black-and-white cartoons produced from 1933 to 1943. In December 2018, a fourth volume featuring the first 14 color shorts from 1943 to 1945 was released on DVD and Blu-ray from Warner Home Video through the Warner Archive Collection. For more than 20 years, Stephen DeStefano has been the artist drawing Popeye for King Features licensing, including the DVD and Blu-Ray covers for Warner Bros.

==== Original television cartoons ====
In 1960, King Features Syndicate commissioned a new series of cartoons titled Popeye the Sailor, but this time for television syndication. Al Brodax served as executive producer of the cartoons for King Features. Jack Mercer, Mae Questel, and Jackson Beck returned for this series, which was produced by a number of companies, including Jack Kinney Productions, Rembrandt Films, Larry Harmon Productions, Halas and Batchelor, and Paramount Cartoon Studios (formerly Famous Studios). The artwork was streamlined and simplified for the television budgets, and 220 cartoons were produced in only two years, with the first set of them premiering in the autumn of 1960, and the last of them debuting during the 1961–1962 television season. For these cartoons, Bluto's name was changed to "Brutus", as King Features believed at the time that Paramount owned the rights to the name "Bluto". Many of the cartoons made by Paramount used plots and storylines taken directly from the comic strip sequences – as well as characters like King Blozo and the Sea Hag. Since King Features has exclusive rights to these Popeye cartoons, they have been released on home video, with 85 of them included in a 75th anniversary Popeye DVD boxed set in 2004.

Popeye, Olive Oyl, Swee'Pea and Wimpy were featured prominently in the cartoon movie Popeye Meets the Man Who Hated Laughter, which debuted on October 7, 1972, as one of the episodes of The ABC Saturday Superstar Movie. It was co-directed and co-produced by Hal Seeger at Hal Seeger Productions and Jack Zander at Zander's Animation Parlour. In this cartoon, Brutus also appears as a turban-wearing employee of the nemesis, Dr. Morbid Grimsby.

On September 9, 1978, The All New Popeye Hour debuted on the CBS Saturday morning lineup. It was an hour-long animated series produced by Hanna-Barbera Productions, which tried its best to retain the style of the original comic strip (Popeye returned to his original costume and Brutus to his original name of Bluto), while complying with the prevailing content restrictions on violence. In addition to providing many of the cartoon scripts, Mercer continued to voice Popeye, while Marilyn Schreffler and Allan Melvin became the new voices of Olive Oyl and Bluto, respectively. The All New Popeye Hour ran on CBS until September 1981, when it was cut to a half-hour and retitled The Popeye and Olive Comedy Show. It was removed from the CBS lineup in September 1983, the year before Jack Mercer's death. These cartoons have also been released on VHS and DVD.

During the time these cartoons were in production, CBS aired The Popeye Valentine's Day Special – Sweethearts at Sea on February 14, 1979.

Popeye briefly returned to CBS in 1987 for Popeye and Son, another Hanna-Barbera series, which featured Popeye and Olive as a married couple with a son named Popeye Jr., who hates the taste of spinach, but eats it to boost his strength. Maurice LaMarche performed Popeye's voice as Mercer had died in 1984. The show lasted for one season. USA Network later picked up reruns of the series after CBS's cancellation. Additionally, the series aired on The Family Channel from 1994 until 1995. In 1998, artist Frank Caruso and animator David Redl produced two pitch pilots for a series titled Popeye Untold.

In 2004, Lionsgate produced an animated television special, Popeye's Voyage: The Quest for Pappy to coincide with the 75th anniversary of Popeye. Billy West performed the voice of Popeye, describing the production as "the hardest job I ever did, ever" and the voice of Popeye as "like a buzzsaw on your throat". The uncut version was released on DVD on November 9, 2004; and was aired in a re-edited version on Fox on December 17, 2004, and again on December 30, 2005. Its style was influenced by the 1930s Fleischer cartoons, and featured Swee'Pea, Wimpy, Bluto, Olive Oyl, Poopdeck Pappy, and the Sea Hag as its characters. On November 6, 2007, Lionsgate re-released Popeye's Voyage on DVD with redesigned cover art.

==== Web series ====
On December 2, 2018, a Popeye web series named Popeye's Island Adventures produced by WildBrain subsidiary WildBrain Spark Studios premiered on the official Popeye YouTube channel. With intent on drawing in a younger, contemporary, international audience, the new series has updated the Popeye characters to fit the times. For instance, Popeye grows his own spinach and has replaced his corncob pipe with a bosun's whistle. Bluto no longer sports a beard and focuses his time on stealing Popeye's spinach rather than his girlfriend. Olive Oyl is shown as an inventor and engineer. The characters are drawn to appear younger than typically done, save Swea'pea, and no words are spoken, with all actions mimed.

=== Theme song ===
"I'm Popeye the Sailor Man"

Song by Billy Costello later by Jack Mercer
- Released: 1933
- Recorded: 1933
- Composer: Sammy Lerner

I'm Popeye the Sailor Man,
I'm Popeye the Sailor Man,
I'm strong to the "finich",
'cause I eats me spinach,
I'm Popeye the Sailor Man!

Popeye's theme song, titled "I'm Popeye the Sailor Man", composed by Sammy Lerner in 1933 for Fleischer's first Popeye the Sailor cartoon, has become forever associated with the sailor. "The Sailor's Hornpipe" has often been used as an introduction to Popeye's theme song.

In 1978, Japanese group Spinach Power released a disco version of the song, which became a hit, selling 400,000 copies. The song was used as an insert song in the Japanese film The Young Animals (Japanese: 皮ジャン反抗族, Hepburn: Kawa Jan Hankō-zoku) the same year. A cover of the theme song, performed by Face to Face, is included on the 1995 tribute album Saturday Morning: Cartoons' Greatest Hits, produced by Ralph Sall for MCA Records. A jazz version, performed by Ted Kooshian's Standard Orbit Quartet, appears on their 2009 Summit Records release Underdog and Other Stories.

Playground song parodies of the theme have become part of children's street culture around the world, usually interpolating "frying pan" or "garbage can" into the lyrics as Popeye's dwelling place and ascribing to the character various unsavory actions or habits that transform the character into an "Anti-Popeye", and changing his exemplary spinach-based diet into an inedible morass of worms, onions, flies, tortillas and snot.

=== Radio ===
Popeye was adapted to radio in several series broadcast over three different networks by two sponsors from 1935 to 1938. Popeye and most of the major supporting characters were first featured in a thrice-weekly 15-minute radio program, Popeye the Sailor, which starred Detmar Poppen as Popeye, along with most of the major supporting characters—Olive Oyl (Olive Lamoy), Wimpy (Charles Lawrence), Bluto (Jackson Beck) and Swee'Pea (Mae Questel). In the first episode, Popeye adopted Sonny (Jimmy Donnelly), a character later known as Matey the Newsboy. This program was broadcast Tuesday, Thursday and Saturday nights at 7:15pm. September 10, 1935, through March 28, 1936, on the NBC Red Network (87 episodes), initially sponsored by Wheatena, a whole-wheat breakfast cereal, which routinely replaced the spinach references. Music was provided by Victor Irwin's Cartoonland Band. Announcer Kelvin Keech sang (to composer Lerner's "Popeye" theme) "Wheatena is his diet / He asks you to try it / With Popeye the sailor man." Wheatena paid King Features Syndicate $1,200 per week.

The show was next broadcast Mondays, Wednesdays and Fridays from 7:15 to 7:30pm on WABC and ran from August 31, 1936, to February 26, 1937 (78 episodes). Floyd Buckley played Popeye, and Miriam Wolfe portrayed both Olive Oyl and the Sea Hag. Once again, reference to spinach was conspicuously absent. Instead, Popeye sang, "Wheatena's me diet / I ax ya to try it / I'm Popeye the Sailor Man".

The third series was sponsored by the maker of Popsicles three nights a week for 15 minutes at 6:15 pm on CBS from May 2, 1938, through July 29, 1938.

Of the three series, only 20 of the 204 episodes are known to be preserved.

=== Feature films ===
==== Popeye (1980) ====
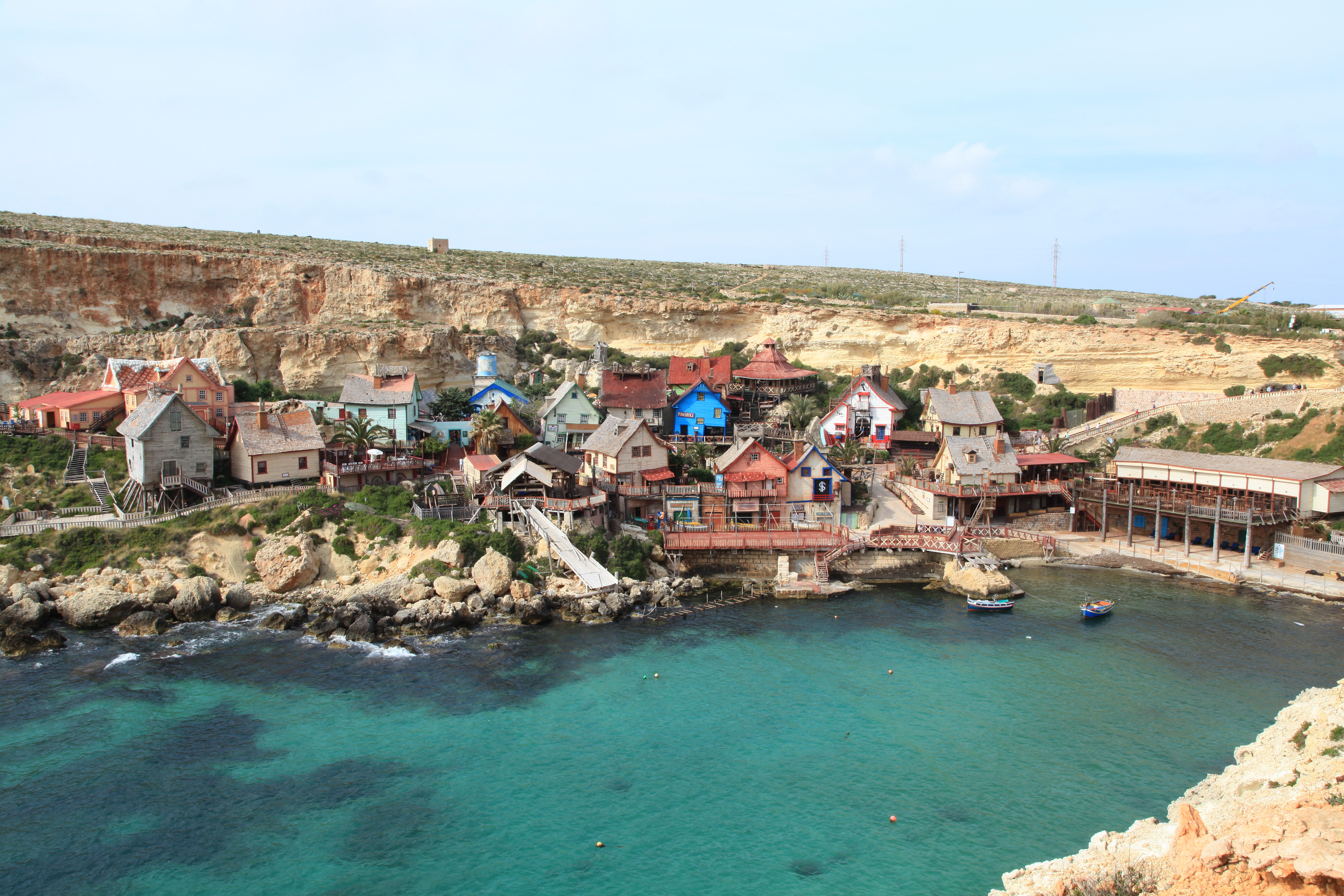
Popeye Village in Malta, built as a location set for the feature film

Director Robert Altman used the character in Popeye (1980), the first film centered on the character, who was played by Robin Williams in this film. This live-action musical feature film was a co-production of Paramount Pictures and Walt Disney Productions, and it was filmed almost entirely on Malta, in the village of Mellieħa on the northwest coast of the island (the set is now a tourist attraction called Popeye Village).

The U.S. box office earnings were double the film's budget, making it a financial success. While the film received mostly negative reviews at the time, critical opinion has improved over the years.

==== Canceled animated films ====
The 1988 Walt Disney/Touchstone Pictures film Who Framed Roger Rabbit featured many classic cartoon characters, and the absence of Popeye was noted by some critics. Popeye (along with Olive Oyl, Bluto, and Wimpy) actually had a cameo role planned for the film, with him and Bluto as pallbearers at Marvin Acme's funeral. However, Disney could not obtain the rights in time and Popeye's cameo was dropped from the film.

In March 2010, it was reported that Sony Pictures Animation was developing an animated Popeye film, with Avi Arad producing it. In November 2011, Sony Pictures Animation announced that Jay Scherick and David Ronn, the writers of The Smurfs, are writing the screenplay for the film. In June 2012, it was reported that Genndy Tartakovsky had been set to direct the feature, which he planned to make "as artful and unrealistic as possible." In November 2012, Sony Pictures Animation set the release date for September 26, 2014, which was, in May 2013, pushed back to 2015. In March 2014, Sony Pictures Animation updated its slate, scheduling the film for 2016, and announcing Tartakovsky as the director of Hotel Transylvania 2, which he was directing concurrently with Popeye. On September 18, 2014, Tartakovsky revealed an "animation test" footage, about which he said, "It's just something that kind of represents what we want to do. I couldn't be more excited by how it turned out." In March 2015, Tartakovsky announced that despite the well-received test footage, he was no longer working on the project, and would instead direct Can You Imagine?, which was based on his own original idea, but it too was cancelled. Nevertheless, Sony Pictures Animation stated the project still remained in active development. In January 2016, it was announced that T.J. Fixman would write the film. On May 11, 2020, it was announced that a Popeye movie was in development at King Features Syndicate with Genndy Tartakovsky coming back to the project. However, on July 21, 2022, Tartakovsky said the project was cancelled. An animatic for the film was leaked onto the internet the following day.

==== Second live-action film ====
On March 19, 2024, it was announced that a new live-action Popeye film was being developed at Chernin Entertainment with a screenplay written by Michael Caleo for King Features.

=== Video and pinball games ===
- The 1981 Nintendo video game Donkey Kong, which introduced its eponymous character and Nintendo's unofficial company mascot Mario to the world, was originally planned to be a Popeye game. However, when Nintendo experienced difficulty portraying the characters within the limits of the game's hardware, it decided to create original characters instead. Popeye was replaced with Mario (then known as Jumpman), Bluto was replaced with Donkey Kong, and Olive Oyl was replaced with the character Pauline.
- When Donkey Kong, which was originally conceived as a Popeye video game by Shigeru Miyamoto, proved to be a big success, King Features agreed to license the characters to Nintendo to create a Popeye arcade game in 1982. It was later ported to various home gaming platforms, including the Commodore 64, Intellivision, Atari 2600, Atari 8-bit computers, ColecoVision, Odyssey^{2}, and Nintendo Entertainment System. The goal was to avoid Brutus and the Sea Hag while collecting items produced by Olive Oyl such as hearts, musical notes, or the letters in the word "help" (depending on the level). Hitting a can of spinach gave Popeye a brief chance to strike back at Brutus. Other characters such as Wimpy and Swee'Pea appeared in the game but did not affect gameplay. A board game based on the video game was released by Parker Brothers.
- Nintendo also released two Game & Watch units featuring Popeye.
- Nintendo created another Popeye game for the Japanese Famicom, Popeye no Eigo Asobi, in 1983. This was an educational game designed to teach Japanese children English words.
- A different Popeye game was developed for the ZX Spectrum by Don Priestley and first released by DK'Tronics in 1985. The game achieved critical success due to its huge, colorful sprites; amongst the largest seen on the Spectrum platform. This distinct graphical style was due to King Features' insistence that any game had to include fair representations of the central cartoon characters. The game was ported to Commodore 64 and Amstrad CPC in 1986. After releasing the budget version of this game, Alternative Software developed another two licensed games, Popeye 2 (1991) and Popeye 3: Wrestle Crazy (1992) on the same platforms.
- Sigma Enterprises published two Popeye games for the Game Boy. The first, titled simply Popeye, was released exclusively in Japan in 1990, while Popeye 2 was released in Japan in 1991, North America in 1993, and Europe in 1994 by Activision.
- In 1994, Technos Japan released Popeye Beach Volleyball for the Game Gear, and Popeye: Tale of the Wicked Witch Sea Hag (Popeye: Ijiwaru Majo Shihaggu no Maki) for the Super Famicom, both exclusively in Japan. The latter is a side-scrolling adventure game mixed with a board game, which features many characters from the Thimble Theatre series as well. In the game, Popeye has to recover magical hearts scattered across the level to restore his friends, who have been turned to stone as part of a spell cast upon them by the Sea Hag.
- Midway (under the Bally label) released Popeye Saves the Earth, a SuperPin pinball game, in 1994.
- A Sega Genesis Popeye game, Popeye in High Seas High-Jinks, was planned but never released. A prototype of the game was later discovered by the Video Game History Foundation in 2025, as part of a group of prototypes that had been evaluated for distribution via Sega Channel.
- In 2004, Sammy Corporation released CR Popeye, a pachinko machine.
- In 2005, Bandai Namco released a Game Boy Advance video game called Popeye: Rush for Spinach.
- In fall 2007, Namco Networks released the original Nintendo Popeye arcade game for mobile phones with new features including enhanced graphics and a new level.
- In November 2021, independent developer Sabec LTD released what it called the "official Popeye game" for the Nintendo Switch, featuring a three-dimensional adaptation of the "classic arcade game".
- Popeye and Bluto were introduced as playable characters in the sea combat game World of Warships.

=== Marketing, tie-ins, and endorsements ===
From early on, Popeye was heavily merchandised. Everything from soap to razor blades to spinach was available with Popeye's likeness on it. Most of these items are rare and sought by collectors, but some merchandise is still produced.

Games and toys

- Mattel produced a variety of Popeye-related toys in the latter half of the 1950s. In 1957, the Popeye spinach can (which contains a trigger to reveal Popeye's head with a squeaker) and the Popeye crank guitar (which plays his theme song on a crank) were released. Unlike most crank guitar models Mattel had made since 1956, Popeye's crank guitar also contains his pipe which a person using it would play the guitar as well with it. A year later in October 1958, Popeye had his own Mattel jack-in-the-box, which also played the same tune as the guitar. In some models, the toy either comes with or without an update feature from the company's Popeye's spinach can toy.
- In 1961, Paramount Cartoon Studios produced a commercial for Soaky, featuring Popeye, Olive, and Bluto and advertising Popeye and Bluto's own bubble bath figurines. For the first time, Popeye and Bluto both fight for an item instead of Olive herself, and punch themselves on-time during the commercial. Both characters later fought over Popeye's own video game in a commercial for Popeye's ColecoVision port 22 years later in 1983, animated by Mark Kausler at Pacific Motion Pictures.
- In 1991, Kinder produced Popeye Kinder Surprise Figures.
- Beginning in 2001, Mezco Toyz makes classic-style Popeye figures in two sizes.
- Kellytoy produces plush stuffed Popeye characters.
- In 2009, Popeye, Olive, and Bluto were used as (Happy Meal) toys in Brazil's Habib's fast-food company restaurants.

Sports

- Starting in 1940, Popeye became the mascot of Clube de Regatas do Flamengo in Rio de Janeiro, Brazil. The mascot of the soccer club is currently a cartoon vulture.
- In 1978–1985, Popeye was used by Japan Airlines as a mascot for their "JAL Ski Tour Hokkaido Campaign".
- During the 2004 NASCAR Nextel Cup Series, two racing cars displaying Popeye characters were driven by Kasey Kahne (No. 9) and Jeremy Mayfield (No. 19), to promote Popeye's 75th anniversary.

Theaters

- In 1994–2004, Popeye, Olive, Swee'Pea and Bluto appeared in some Dickinson Theatres gift-certificate advertisement trailers, animated by Bill Reeds at Willming Reams Animation (also known as Preshow Productions). Popeye is a former mascot of Dickinson Theatres, a decade before the theater chain went out of business.

Restaurants

- Wimpy's name was borrowed for the Wimpy restaurant chain, one of the first international fast food restaurants featuring hamburgers, which they call "Wimpy Burgers".
- The popular fast-food chain Popeyes was founded on June 12, 1972, and is the second-largest "quick-service chicken restaurant group" behind Kentucky Fried Chicken. It was not named after the sailor, but some Popeye references were featured in a few commercials throughout its early years as part of a licensing deal with King Features (the chain was actually named after a fictional detective from the 1971 film The French Connection named Jimmy "Popeye" Doyle). Popeyes locations in Puerto Rico made extensive use of Popeye and other characters. In the mid-2000s, Motion Pixel Corporation produced a Latin American commercial in which Wimpy comes across Popeye's chicken and seafood place. Bluto (here named "Brutus") approaches him and demonstrates his type of food; however, Wimpy ends up choosing Popeye's after smelling a scent leading to the restaurant. He rushes into the restaurant, followed by Popeye, Swea'Pea, Alice the Goon, Eugene the Jeep, Popeye's nephews (Pipeye, Pupeye and Peepeye; Poopeye is oddly absent), Granny, the Sea Hag and Bernard. When Olive walks past Bluto's place on her way to Popeye's, Bluto holds up a sign reading "Pedacitos de Pechuga" ("Small [Chicken] Breasts" in Spanish).
- Wimpy has also appeared in commercials for Burger King and Carl's Jr. hamburgers.

Retail foods and beverages

- Allen Canning Company produces its own line of canned "Popeye Spinach" in multiple varieties. The cartoon Popeye serves as the mascot on the can.
- In 1961, Buitoni Pasta marketed Popeye-shaped spinach macaroni.
- In the late 1960s and 1973, Popeye and Olive appeared in commercials for Start advertising the orange-flavored breakfast drink, animated by Jack Zander at Zack's Animation Parlour.
- In the 1970s, Popeye, Bluto, Olive and Wimpy appeared in commercials for Canada Dry and Nuts.
- In 1970, Popeye and Bluto appeared with Mauricio de Sousa's Monica in a commercial for CICA's Geleia de Mocotó, directed and animated by Daniel Messias. The commercial begins with a boxing match between Popeye and Bluto. Bluto wins the first round and Popeye is left lying in the ring, until Monica appears with Geleia de Mocotó. She tells the sailor that Geleia de Mocotó is the spinach of the new generation. After Popeye eats the product, he returns to the fight and beats Bluto, punching him out of the arena and winning the second (and last) round.
- In 1976, Popeye was used as a spokesman for Ikari Sauce.
- Popeye appeared in a 1979 Dr Pepper commercial during the "Be a Pepper" campaign (possibly as a tie-in for the movie), going so far as to modify his traditional catchphrase to "...and Popeye the Pepper-man").
- In 1984, Popeye, Bluto and Olive made an appearance in a Carling Black Label commercial, directed by Tony May at Park Village and animated by Mike Stuart at Stuart Brooks Animation.
- In 1984–1990, Popeye and Olive appeared in commercials for Frudesa frozen products.
- In 1987, Popeye appeared with Sonny the Cuckoo Bird in a three-part commercial for Cocoa Puffs cereal, directed by Ric Machin at Speedy Cartoons. In the commercial, Sonny and Popeye become stranded on an island, and Popeye can't remember what makes him "tough". A can of spinach washes ashore, and Popeye eats the spinach, getting his strength back. However, both he and Sonny become crazy for Cocoa Puffs when fed the cereal by some kids, and are sent flying, landing on a pair of palm trees.
- In 1987, 1994, and 2020–2023, Popeye, Olive, Wimpy and other characters appeared in commercials for Ajinomoto advertising noodles, spinach herbs and cooking oil.
- Since 1989, "Popeye's Supplements" has been a chain of Canadian Sports Nutrition Stores.
- In 1989–1990, Popeye endorsed Instant Quaker Oatmeal, citing it as a better food than spinach to provide strength. The commercials, animated by Bonita Versh, had the tagline "Can the spinach, I wants me Quaker Oatmeal!" or "Popeye wants a Quaker". The Religious Society of Friends (also known as the Quakers) was offended by the promotion, given the physical aggression from "Popeye the Quaker Man" and also the excessive submissiveness of Olive Oyl.
- In 1990–1991, Spanish company Revilla released Popeye mortadella. The commercials were produced by Studio Andreu.
- In 1993, a Brazilian advert of Popeye's own Knorr soup aired, created by Daniel Venticinque and Sergio Scarpelli and directed by Carlos de Moura Ribeiro Mendes, with animation by Daniel Messias. The advert begins with three kids watching a Popeye cartoon on a television set, where Popeye chases after Bluto, who has captured Olive. Bluto runs around the kids after escaping from the television, followed by Popeye (and Swee'Pea afterward), whom he punches into the wall. While Popeye wakes up, one of the kids hands him his soup. He eats the entire plate filled with soup, and punches Bluto into the television set (with jail cell bars covering the glass of the television). The advert ends with everyone singing Popeye's theme song, while Bluto rattles the bars and struggles to get out until Swee'Pea turns the television off.
- In 1993, Popeye appeared in a few McCain Foods "1-2-3 Frites" fries adverts in Germany, produced by DDB. Some of the adverts involve Popeye working out with dumbbells or trying to push a homemade boat to shore.
- In 1999, Popeye and Olive appeared in a Campbell's commercial. In the commercial, Popeye sees Olive stuck on railroad tracks while an incoming steam locomotive approaches. He finds his soup in the cabinet with cans of spinach, eats the soup, and saves Olive from the locomotive, and sings his theme song with the Campbell's can on the side of his window.
- In 2000, Popeye appeared in a Spanish advert for La Piara Iron Butter, produced by Full Animation and Altraforma.
- In 2001, Popeye (along with Bluto, Olive, and twin Wimpys) appeared in a television commercial for Minute Maid orange juice. The commercial, directed by Mike Smith at Acme Filmworks, Inc. and produced by Leo Burnett Co, showed Popeye and Bluto as friends, due to them having had Minute Maid orange juice that morning. The ad agency's intention was to show that even the notable enemies would be in a good mood after their juice, but some, including Robert Knight of the Culture and Family Institute, felt the commercial's intent was to portray the pair in a homosexual romantic relationship; even so, it is a suggestion that Minute Maid denies. Knight was interviewed by Stephen Colbert on Comedy Central's The Daily Show about this issue.
- In 2005, Hana Farms Inc. produced Popeye-based juice boxes and bottles across Syria. An advert survives online, involving Bluto kidnapping Olive and carrying her along the top of a building, while Popeye tries to save her. He wears bottles and juice boxes all over him, to which Bluto makes fun of him. Bluto then throws three cans of spinach at Popeye. While ducking, Popeye still gets hit by one of the cans, but surprisingly considers drinking one of his bottles. Bluto then begins tackling Popeye, who punches him, sending him flying. Bluto crashes into a wall on another part of the building, the impact causing a large sign to fall toward the building. Olive, frightened by the sign, accidentally falls off the building, but is saved by Popeye, holding on to an unlocated rope.
- World Candies Inc. produced Popeye-branded "candy cigarettes", which were small sugar sticks with red dye at the end to simulate embers. They were sold in a small box, similar to a cigarette pack. The company still produces the item, but has since changed the name to "Popeye Candy Sticks" and has ceased putting the red dye at the end.
- In 2013, McLean Design produced a packaging design using licensed characters and artwork for a Popeye-branded energy drink. The drink launched in the US with two flavors.

Other

- During the 1960s, Popeye appeared in adverts for Crown gasoline.
- In 1979, salsa singer Adalberto Santiago performed the song "Popeye El Marino", which was released by Fania Records as part of the singer's second album Adalberto Featuring Popeye El Marino.
- In connection with the 1980 film, Popeye and Olive made an appearance in a 1983 Toyota Corolla commercial.
- In 1984, Popeye, Olive and Bluto appeared in a Dutch (English dubbed) PSA advert for milk, produced and animated by Dan Haskett, Dan Hunn and Ron Fritz at King Features Syndicate, with the slogan "Melk. Der witte motor" ("Milk. The white engine"). The advert begins with Popeye and Bluto heading to Olive's house, singing "Oh My Darling, Clementine". Bluto knocks Popeye down a manhole, after which he and Olive go for a picnic. During the picnic, Bluto asks Olive for a kiss, to which she replies that she is "still going steady with Popeye". Angered at this, Bluto kisses Olive, who slaps him and calls for help. Popeye arrives at the scene, but Bluto grabs him and forms a bow and arrow, and sends him flying into a tree. He lands next to some milk, notices it and drinks the entire carton, much to Bluto's shock and confusion. Bluto asks Popeye if he is "making a mistake", but Popeye denies the question and punches him up in the sky, forming fireworks.
- In 1986, Stabur Graphics published the lithograph "Voice For Children", a charity art project intended to raise funds for the Child Welfare League of America, where many cartoonists collaborated to create sketches of their characters singing and playing in an orchestra and sign the artwork. Popeye and Olive were featured in the litho, drawn by Bud Sagendorf.
- In 1986, Popeye and Bluto appeared in three Brazilian adverts for Atlantic Petroleum Ultramo motor oil, with two of them featuring Olive. The adverts were animated by Gustavo Machado, Alexandre Calheiros, Robert Sprathoff and Cleiton Cafeu at Briquet Filmes, with soundtrack by Echo's Studio, sound design and production by Fernando Lauletta, and direction by Nicola Lauletta. In the adverts, Bluto causes trouble to Popeye's vehicle(s), followed by Popeye giving the car the motor oil, and revenging Bluto entirely.
- In 1986, Popeye appeared in a commercial for Hitachi, advertising refrigerators that could store fruits and vegetables. In it, Popeye searches for spinach with a telescope, until a female demonstrator calls him over to a refrigerator. A chilled drawer opens to reveal fruits and vegetables, including some spinach. Popeye eats the spinach and begins dancing with excitement.
- In 1987, Olive and Swee'Pea appeared in a Solo commercial.
- In 1987, Popeye made an appearance in a radio commercial for Timberland.
- In 1987, Stabur Graphics commissioned artist Will Elder to paint "Popeye's Wedding" as oil on masonite. Released was a stamped, numbered, and signed Limited Edition lithograph, an edition size of 395. The lithograph shows Popeye slipping a lifesaver-ring onto Olive's finger along with Nana Oyl, Alice the Goon, Swee'Pea (cradled in Popeye's free arm), Wimpy, Granny, Eugene the Jeep, and Brutus (holding a large cauldron of steaming, cooked rice). 21 other characters watch from the pews. The litho is titled "Wit Dis Lifesaver, I Dee Wed!" and is pictured on page 83 of Elder's 2006 book Chicken Fat.
- In 1988–1996, Popeye and Olive appeared in Suzuki commercials (animated by Kōji Nanke) and brochures advertising the Suzuki Alto Works.
- In 1989, independent television stations began airing a Popeye hotline for children, along with a premium-rate telephone number, announcing that his 60th anniversary was "around the corner". The call mostly contains characters telling children about their adventures and, for special events, presents would be given to children for special support for Popeye's 60th birthday. The commercial uses clips from the King Features Syndicate television series.
- In 1989–1990, King Features Syndicate partnered with the Center for Marine Conservation to launch a campaign featuring the Popeye characters, warning of the harmful effects of coastal pollution, which was tied to the maritime nature of the character. The conservation distributed a public service announcement, in which Bluto carelessly dumps garbage over the side of his boat, to which Olive reacts in horror as sea creatures are caught in six-pack ring holders. Popeye eats spinach and blows a tornado from his pipe, which cleans up Bluto's garbage and dumps it on him; however, when some more plastic garbage sails by Popeye's boat, he says unsurprisingly, "I can't do it all meself, peoples!" and encourages viewers to be careful about littering at sea. The commercial was produced by Jaime Diaz Productions and animated by Claudio Briasco among others.
- In 1990, Popeye, Olive and Bluto appeared in an advert for the Brazilian retail store chain Lojas Americanas. In the advert, Bluto ties Olive up and plans to melt all the Easter eggs in Lojas Americanas. Popeye demonstrates the new sales in the chain, before rescuing Olive offscreen.
- In 1995, the Popeye comic strip was one of 20 included in the Comic Strip Classics series of commemorative U.S. postage stamps.
- In 1996–1999, the Darien Lake theme park in Western New York operated a "Popeye's Seaport" in the park. It was rebranded as "Looney Tunes Seaport" after Darien Lake came under the Six Flags banner.
- In 1999, Popeye & Bluto's Bilge-Rat Barges opened with Universal Studios Orlando Resort's island theme park, Universal's Islands of Adventure. It is a river rafting water ride, themed after Popeye saving Olive Oyl from Bluto. There is also a kids' playground, Me Ship, the Olive, built in and around Popeye's ship. The three levels of the ship all contain a variety of interactive elements including cannons and hoses which can further soak riders on the Popeye and Bluto's Bilge-Rat Barge ride.
- In 2004, Hino Motors used Popeye as an image character on their light commercial truck, the Hino Dutro.
- In 2005, King Features Syndicate introduced the Baby Popeye line of children's products.
- In October 2007, to coincide with the launch of the Popeye mobile game, Namco Networks and Sprint launched a Popeye sweepstakes offering the authorized edition four-disc Popeye the Sailor: 1933–1938, Volume 1 DVD set as the grand prize.
- In 2012, King Features Syndicate teamed up with rock band Wilco to produce an animated music video for their song "Dawned on Me", featuring appearances from Popeye, Olive, Bluto, Swea'Pea and Wimpy in their Fleischer Studios designs. The video was directed by Darren Romanelli and animated in Singapore by Peach Blossom Media.
- In 2014, Hill Holiday produced a commercial for the Bank of America, featuring Popeye characters and directed by Niklas Rissler and Derek Picken at Passion Pictures. In the commercial, Wimpy demonstrates the functionality of the bank's mobile banking app by paying his debts to Bluto, Olive and Popeye via mobile phone.

== Cultural influences ==
=== Super heroes ===
An American World War II fundraising poster

Culturally, many consider Popeye a precursor to the superheroes who eventually dominated U.S. comic books.

Popeye would inspire Icelandic athlete Magnús Scheving to create a better role model character in health for children, that being the superhero character of Sportacus in LazyTown. Scheving mentioned "There was Popeye, who eats spinach, but he smoked and hit people. And you thought, maybe that's not a good role model. Maybe we need a different role model for kids. And there was no entertainment brand dedicated to kids' health in the world."

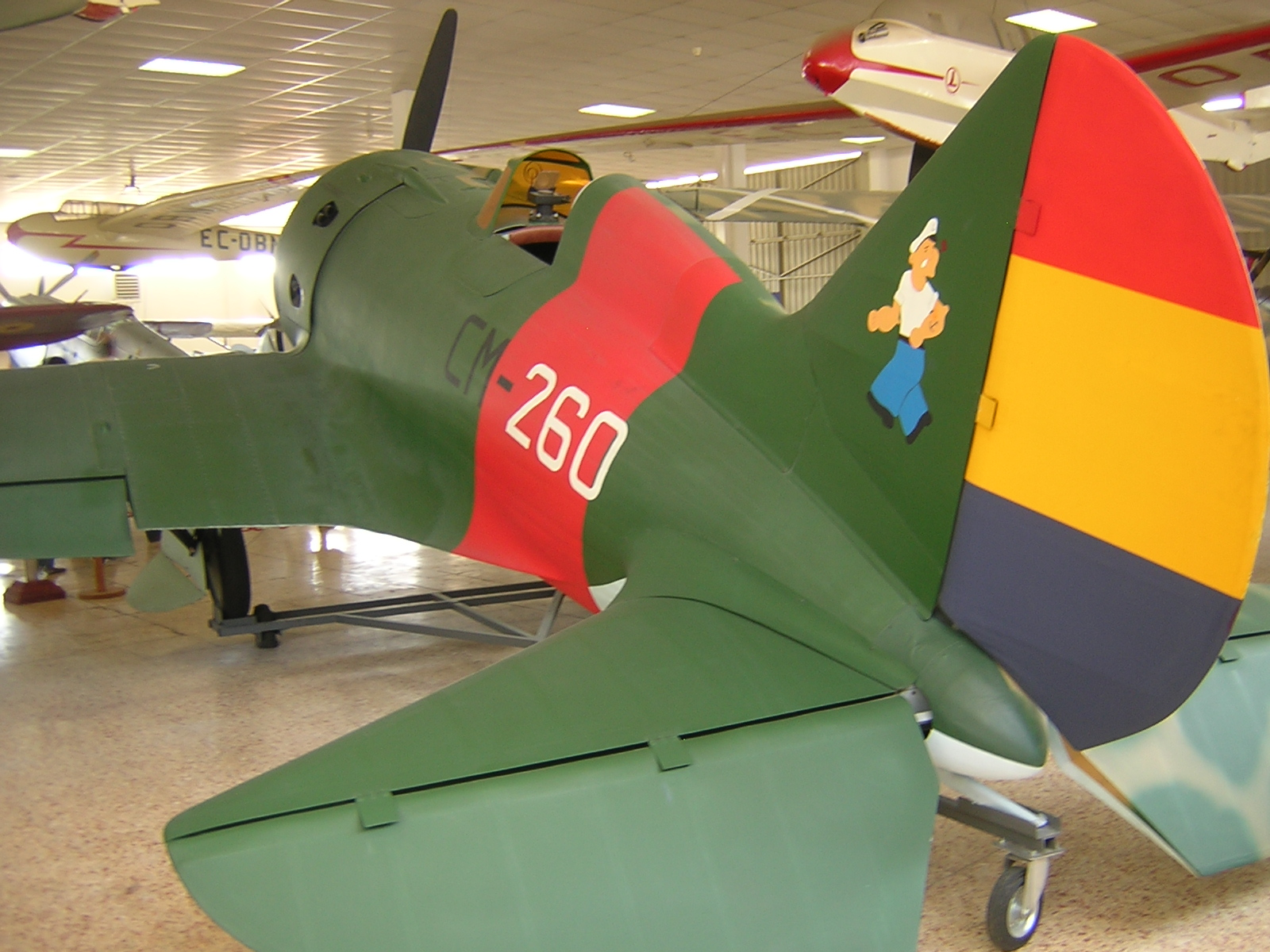
Popeye on a Spanish Republican Air Force Polikarpov I-16. Museo del Aire

=== The Popeye dance ===
The Popeye was a popular dance in the dance craze era of the late 1950s and early 1960s. Originating in New Orleans around 1962, the Popeye was performed by shuffling and moving one's arms, placing one arm behind and one arm in front and alternating them, going through the motion of raising a pipe up to the mouth, and alternate sliding or pushing one foot back in the manner of ice skating, similar to motions exhibited by the cartoon character. According to music historian Robert Pruter, the Popeye was even more popular than the Twist in New Orleans. The dance was associated with and/or referenced to in several songs, including Eddie Bo's "Check Mr. Popeye", Chris Kenner's "Something You Got" and "Land of a Thousand Dances", Chubby Checker's "Popeye The Hitchhiker", Frankie Ford's "You Talk Too Much", Ernie K-Doe's "Popeye Joe", Huey "Piano" Smith's "Popeye", The Sherrys "Pop Pop Pop-Pie", and Harvey Fuqua's "Any Way You Wanta". A compilation of 23 Popeye dance songs was released in 1996 under the title New Orleans Popeye Party.

=== Spinach ===
Initially Popeye's chief superhuman characteristic was his indestructibility, rather than super strength, which was attributed to his having rubbed the head of Bernice the Whiffle Hen numerous times after being shot. Popeye later attributed his strength to spinach. The popularity of Popeye helped boost spinach sales. Using Popeye as a role model for healthier eating may work; a 2010 study revealed that children increased their vegetable consumption after watching Popeye cartoons. The spinach-growing community of Crystal City, Texas, erected a statue of the character in recognition of Popeye's positive effects on the spinach industry. There are also statues in Springdale and Alma, Arkansas (which claims to be "The Spinach Capital of the World"), at canning plants of Allen Canning, which markets Popeye-branded canned spinach. In addition to Allen Canning's Popeye spinach, Popeye Fresh Foods markets bagged, fresh spinach with Popeye characters on the package. In 2006, when spinach contaminated with E. coli was accidentally sold to the public, many editorial cartoonists lampooned the affair by featuring Popeye in their cartoons.

A frequently circulated story claims that Fleischer's choice of spinach to give Popeye strength was based on faulty calculations of its iron content. In the story, a scientist misplaced a decimal point in an 1870 measurement of spinach's iron content, leading to an iron value ten times higher than it should have been. The error was not a slipped decimal point but a measurement error that was corrected in the 1930s; however, the myth of extraordinarily high iron content persisted. In addition, in one 1932 episode Popeye claims he eats spinach because it is "full of Vitamin A" without mentioning its iron content.

=== Word coinages ===
The strip is also responsible for popularizing, although not inventing, the word "goon" (meaning a thug or lackey); goons in Popeye's world were large humanoids with indistinctly drawn faces that were particularly known for being used as muscle and slave labor by Popeye's nemesis, the Sea Hag. One particular goon, the aforementioned female named Alice, was an occasional recurring character in the animated shorts, but she was usually a fairly nice character.

Eugene the Jeep was introduced in the comic strip on March 13, 1936. Two years later the term "jeep wagons" was in use, later shortened to simply "jeep" with widespread World War II usage and then trademarked by Willys-Overland as "Jeep".

In medicine, the bulge indicating a bicep tear is called the Popeye sign.

=== Events and honors ===
The Popeye Picnic is held every year in Chester, Illinois, on the weekend after Labor Day. Popeye fans attend from across the globe, including a visit by a film crew from South Korea in 2004. The one-eyed sailor's hometown strives to entertain devotees of all ages.

In honor of Popeye's 75th anniversary, the Empire State Building illuminated its notable tower lights green the weekend of January 16–18, 2004 as a tribute to the icon's love of spinach. This special lighting marked the only time the Empire State Building ever celebrated the anniversary/birthday of a comic strip character.

=== Popeye & Friends Character Trail ===
Chester, Illinois, Segar's hometown, erected a statue of Popeye in Segar's honor in 1977 and began the Popeye & Friends Character Trail in 2006, adding new statues honoring the other Thimble Theater characters each year.

This Character Trail is spread throughout Chester and includes (with unveiling dates):

- Popeye (1977)
- J. Wellington Wimpy (2006)
- Olive Oyl, Swee'Pea, and Jeep (2007)
- Bluto (2008)
- Castor Oyl and Whiffle Hen (2009)
- Sea Hag and Bernard (2010)
- Cole Oyl (2011)
- Alice the Goon and her Goon-child (2012)
- Poopdeck Pappy (2013)
- Professor Wotasnozzle (2014)
- RoughHouse (2015)
- Pipeye, Pupeye, Peepeye, and Poopeye, Popeye's four nephews (2016)
- King Blozo (2017)
- Nana Oyl (2018)
- Popeye's Pups (September 2019)
- Sherlock & Segar (December 2019)
- Toar (2020)
- Harold Hamgravy (2021)
- Oscar (2022)

Frank "Rocky" Fiegel was the real-life inspiration for the character Popeye. His parents, Bartłomiej and Anna H. Fiegiel, had come from the area of the Greater Poland Voivodeship, then part of Prussia, and migrated to the United States. He had a prominent chin, sinewy physique, characteristic pipe, and a propensity and agile skill for fist-fighting. Fiegel died on March 24, 1947, never having married. His gravestone has an image of Popeye engraved on it. Segar regularly sent money to Fiegel (as a thank you for the inspiration) according to Segar's assistant and successor, Bud Sagendorf and Popeye historian Michael Brooks.

Additional hometown residents of Chester have inspired other Segar characters, including Dora Paskel, an uncommonly tall, angular lady who ran a general store in town and was the origin for Popeye's gal, Olive Oyl. She even wore a hair bun close to her neckline. William "Windy Bill" Schuchert, a rather rotund man who owned the local opera house (and was Segar's early employer), was the seed for the character J. Wellington Wimpy. He even sent out his employees to purchase hamburgers for him between performances at a local tavern named Wiebusch's, the same tavern Fiegel frequented and where he engaged in fistfights.

A conjecture presented in a 2009 book raised the idea that while living in Santa Monica, Segar might have based some of Popeye's language on a local fisherman, even though the article has yet to make a definitive claim.

=== References in other media ===
==== Comics ====
- Parody versions of Popeye and Bluto make an appearance in Solo Ex-Mutants #2 (Eternity Comics, 1988).
- In EC Comics' original Mad comic book, the satire "Poopeye" had him set up to fight other comic characters, even defeating Superman in the end.
- In 1973, Cary Bates created Captain Strong, a takeoff of Popeye, for DC Comics, as a way of having two cultural icons – Superman and (a proxy of) Popeye – meet.

==== Feature films ====
In 2025, when Popeye started becoming public domain in the US, the character was the subject of several live-action horror films that reimagined the character as a murderous antagonist:

- Popeye's Revenge, a British horror film directed by William Stead and produced by ITN Studios. It was the first live-action horror film centered on Popeye, played by Steven Murphy. The film was released in the US on February 13, 2025, on VOD before being made available on Amazon Prime Video on February 19, 2025.
- Popeye the Slayer Man, the first live-action horror film centered on Popeye to be produced in the United States. The film, distributed by Vantage Media, revolves around a group of friends who sneak into an abandoned spinach factory, but are now haunted by Popeye, played by Jason Robert Stephens. The film was released on March 21, 2025.
- Shiver Me Timbers, a British horror comedy film centered on a monstrous version of Popeye, played by Tony Greer. Gravitas Ventures released the film on April 1, 2025.

==== Television ====
Popeye makes a one-second appearance in an unfinished production Bring Me the Head of Charlie Brown by the California Institute of the Arts in 1986. He is seen punching Rocky Balboa in the face.

== Filmography ==
=== Theatrical ===
- Popeye the Sailor (1933–1942, produced by Fleischer Studios, 109 cartoons)
- Popeye the Sailor (1942–1957, produced by Famous Studios, 122 cartoons)
- Popeye (1980, produced by Paramount Pictures and Walt Disney Pictures, directed by Robert Altman; live-action)

=== Television ===
- Popeye the Sailor (1960–1962, first-run syndication; produced by Larry Harmon Pictures, Rembrandt Films, Halas and Batchelor, Gerald Ray Studios, Jack Kinney Productions, Paramount Cartoon Studios and Corona Cinematografica for King Features Syndicate, 220 cartoons)
- The All New Popeye Hour (1978–1983, CBS; produced by Hanna-Barbera Productions, 167 cartoons) Known as The Popeye and Olive Comedy Show for its final season.
- Popeye and Son (1987–1988, CBS; produced by Hanna-Barbera Productions, 26 cartoons)

=== Television specials ===
- Popeye Meets the Man Who Hated Laughter (1972, ABC; produced by Hal Seeger Productions)
- The Popeye Valentine Special: Sweethearts at Sea (1979, CBS; produced by Hanna-Barbera Productions)

=== Direct-to-video special ===
- Popeye's Voyage: The Quest for Pappy (2004; produced by Mainframe Entertainment for King Features)

=== DVD collections ===
Theatrical cartoons

- Popeye the Sailor: 1933–1938, Volume 1 (released July 31, 2007) features Fleischer cartoons released from 1933 through early 1938 and contains the color Popeye specials Popeye the Sailor Meets Sindbad the Sailor and Popeye the Sailor Meets Ali Baba's Forty Thieves.
- Popeye the Sailor: 1938–1940, Volume 2 (released June 17, 2008) features Fleischer cartoons released from mid-1938 through 1940 and includes the last color Popeye special Aladdin and His Wonderful Lamp.
- Popeye the Sailor: 1941–1943, Volume 3 (released November 4, 2008) features the remaining black-and-white Popeye cartoons released from 1941 to 1943, including the final Fleischer-produced and earliest Famous-produced entries in the series.
- Popeye the Sailor: The 1940s, Volume 1 (released December 11, 2018) features the first 14 color Popeye shorts produced by Famous Studios. The set was made available on Blu-ray and DVD, and the shorts were sourced from 4K masters scanned from the original nitrate negatives.
- Popeye the Sailor: The 1940s, Volume 2 (released June 18, 2019) features the next 15 color Popeye shorts produced by Famous Studios. The set was made available on Blu-ray and DVD, and the shorts were sourced from 4K masters scanned from the original nitrate negatives.
- Popeye the Sailor: The 1940s, Volume 3 (released September 17, 2019) features the next 17 color Popeye shorts produced by Famous Studios. The set was made available on Blu-ray and DVD, and the shorts were sourced from 4K masters scanned from the original nitrate negatives.

TV cartoons

- Popeye the Sailor: The 1960s Classics, Volume 1 (released May 7, 2013) A DVD-R release by Warner Archive Collection consisting mostly of made for TV cartoons produced for King Features Television by Paramount Cartoon Studios and Gerald Ray Studios.

== See also ==
- Popeye the Sailor (film series)
- Public domain film
