= Floyd Buckley =

American actor (1877–1956)

- Born: October 21, 1877; Chatham, New York, U.S.
- Died: November 14, 1956 (aged 79); Queens, New York, U.S.
- Occupation: Actor
- Years active: 1899–1956
- Spouse: Juliet Sparks (m. 1927)
- Children: 3

Floyd Buckley (October 21, 1877 – November 14, 1956) was an American film, stage, and radio actor whose career began with Buffalo Bill and ended with Broadway.

Born in Chatham, New York, Buckley attended St. John's Military Academy in Manlius, New York. He served in the Spanish–American War before he joined Buffalo Bill's Wild West Show in 1899. He worked with the Office of War Information during World War II.

He appeared in 15 films between 1914 and 1953. Besides acting, he worked as a stunt man and produced and directed films. He also acted in the theatrical short, "Be Kind to 'Aminals.'"

During the 1930s, he was the voice of Popeye the Sailor on radio and was in the cast of Keeping Up with Wigglesworth.. He also provided the voice of Popeye in the syndicated TV cartoon version of the program.

Buckley's experience on Broadway began with The Fisher Maiden (1903) and ended when he portrayed Pa Stockdale in No Time for Sergeants (1955). At that time he was the oldest active performer on Broadway.

In 1927, Buckley married dancer Juliet Sparks; they had a son and two daughters.

On November 14, 1956, Buckley died of an aortal aneurysm in Flushing Hospital, aged 79. The aneurysm struck as he returned home from a performance of No Time for Sergeants.

== Selected filmography ==
- The Exploits of Elaine (1914)
- The Fatal Ring (1917)
- God's Law and Man's (1917)
- The House of Hate (1918)
- The Master Mystery (1918 serial film)
