= R. K. Milholland =

American webcomic writer

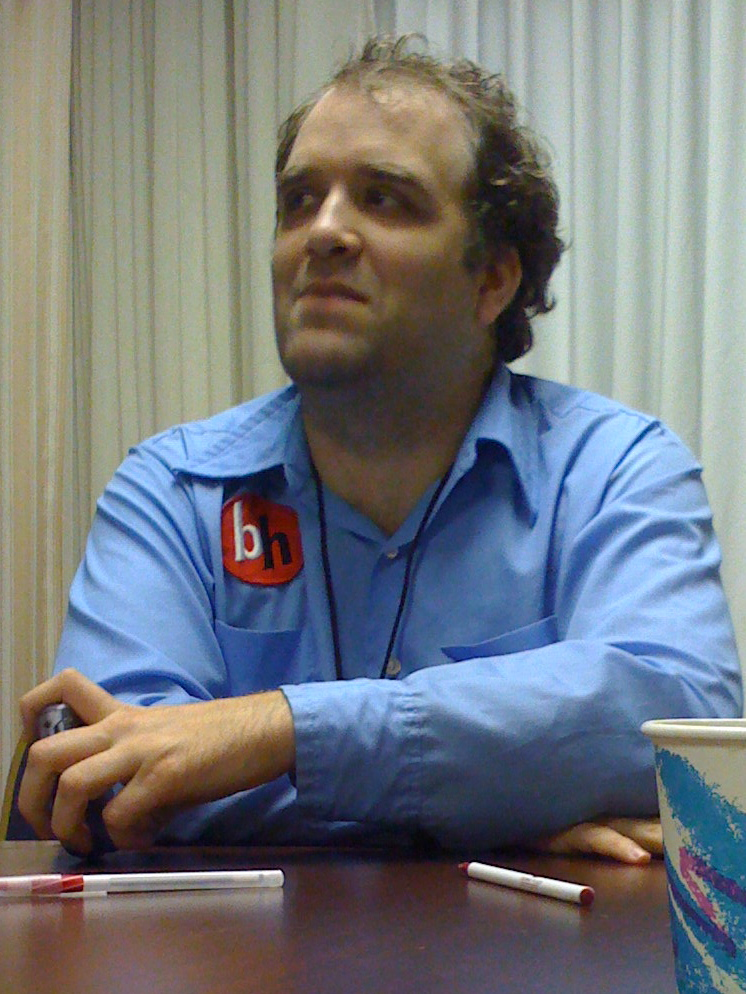
- Born: Randal Keith Milholland; November 25, 1975 (age 50)
- Occupations: Author and Artist
- Years active: 1999 - present
- Notable work: Something Positive

Randal Keith Milholland (born November 25, 1975), better known as R. K. Milholland, is an American webcomic author. His works include Something Positive, New Gold Dreams, Midnight Macabre, Classically Positive and Super Stupor. In 2022, he took over as author of the Sunday edition of the Popeye syndicated comic strip.

== History ==
Raised in Bedford, Texas, Milholland attended Harwood Junior High and Trinity High School in neighboring Euless, Texas. During high school he won several awards for his editorial cartoons. He went on to enroll in the art department at the University of North Texas where he spent four years.

Milholland moved to Boston in the spring of 1999. He worked odd jobs, including stints at a dot com startup, scientific non-profit, medical billing and medical research companies. During this time he started the Something Positive webcomic, in response to a criticism from his friend, voice actress Clarine Harp, that he should "do something positive" with his life. The protagonist in this comic, Davan, is loosely based on Milholland and the stories are often inspired by real life experiences. Davan's best friend Aubrey Chorde is based on Harp.

In June 2004, faced with increasing complaints about his lateness in updating the comic, Milholland challenged his readership to donate enough money to pay for a year of his salary so that he could quit his job and become a full-time cartoonist. To his surprise, this amount was reached and surpassed in less than a month, making Milholland one of the successful pioneers of micropatronage. Since then, his webcomic has expanded into many realms of merchandising.

Milholland has relocated to Texas and travels the con circuit frequently. He also sometimes performs in community theater, especially children's theater. In 2017, he moved to Georgia. In 2019, he moved back to Texas following the signing of Georgia House Bill 481, a so-called "fetal heartbeat bill", into law.

== Comics ==
=== Something Positive ===
Something Positive started its run on December 19, 2001. As of January 2, 2026, it is still being actively updated.

==== Something Positive 1937 ====
Starting on September 7, 2007, Milholland launched a third spin-off from Something Positive, this one also taking place in the same continuity as the original but taking place many years earlier. Something Positive 1937 follows the relationship of Fred's father Vester Macintire and his cousin Davan (Davan of S*P's namesake, first mentioned in the comic's May 8, 2007 strip.) The comic is in black and white and for a time featured in a sidebar next to the original, with archives available on the same page as the original strip. Milholland said in news posts he expected the story to last for a few years, and provided it with its own website on September 24, 2007. The strip stopped updating in 2008.

==== Midnight Macabre ====
Midnight Macabre is another spin-off from Something Positive. It features Gaspar Baugh, the father of Something Positive secondary character Lisa Baugh, as he attempts to resurrect a horror TV show presenting Midnight movies.

=== New Gold Dreams ===
New Gold Dreams is a strip that spoofs the conventions of the heroic fantasy genre. It also ties in with Milholland's interest in role-playing games, as the comic is portrayed as a game run by Pee-Jee, one of the main strip's cast members; some of the characters in New Gold Dreams have the same appearance and personality as regular S*P characters. The comic started on April 2, 2004 but has been entirely on hiatus since the 20th issue in August 2005.

=== Super Stupor ===
Super Stupor is a superhero comic, which mocks the conventions of the genre. Four self-published volumes of the strip are currently available from the Rhymes With Witch store.

=== Popeye ===
Popeye is a newspaper comic strip from King Features Syndicate, starring an ornery sailor and a large cast of quirky characters. In 2022, Popeye's 93rd year, Milholland took over the Sunday edition from Hy Eisman as the latter retired.

=== Mousetrapped ===
In January 2024, with Mickey Mouse's original version of Steamboat Willie becoming public domain, Milholland released the webcomic Mousetrapped. Set after the events of the short, the story follows Mickey struggling to make ends meet after getting fired by Pete and features a cast of other public domain cartoon characters. The series ran through February 2024 before being discontinued by 2025 with the website going defunct. However, the series never formally ended. Milholland revived the series in April 2025, but updates ceased again that May after just four new installments.
