= Popeye Village =

Amusement park in Malta

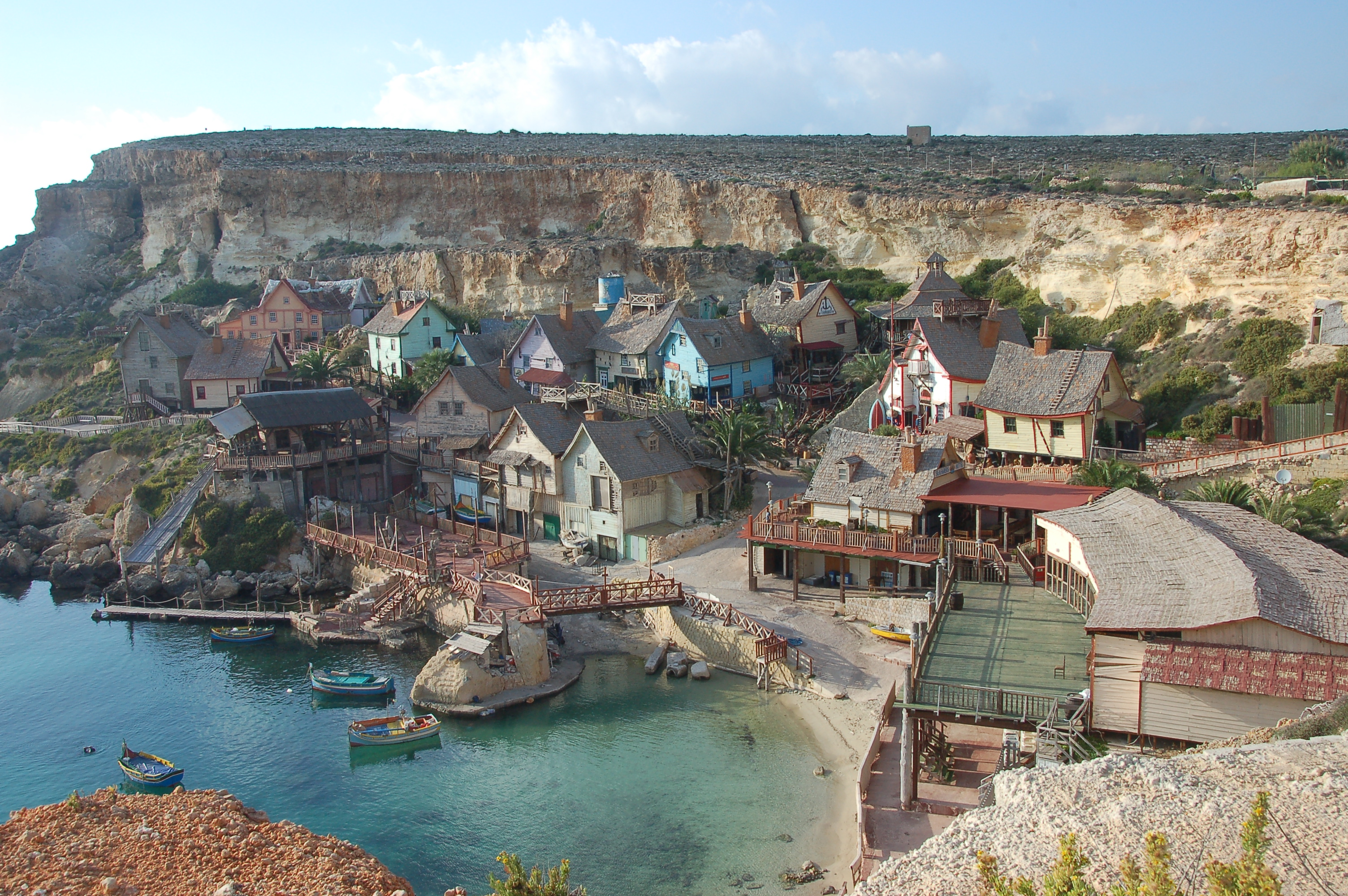
- Interactive map of Popeye Village
- Location: Mellieha, Malta
- Coordinates: 35.960848°N 14.3413°E
- Status: Operating
- Opened: 24 May 1979; 47 years ago
- Website: popeyemalta.com

Popeye Village, also known as Sweethaven Village, is a purpose-built film set village that has been converted into a small attraction fun park, consisting of a collection of rustic and dilapidated wooden buildings. It is located at Prajjet Bay/Anchor Bay, 3 km (1.9 mi) from the village core of Mellieħa, Malta.

It was built as a film set for the production of the 1980 live-action musical feature film Popeye, produced by Paramount Pictures and Walt Disney Productions starring Robin Williams and Shelley Duvall. It is open to the public as an open-air museum and seaside resort.

== History ==
The construction of the film set began in June 1979. A construction crew of 165 working four months was needed to build the village, which consists of 19 wooden buildings. Hundreds of logs and several thousand wooden planks were imported from the Netherlands, while wood shingles used in the construction of the roof tops were imported from Canada. Eight tons of nails and 7,600 L (2,000 US gal) of paint were also used in construction.

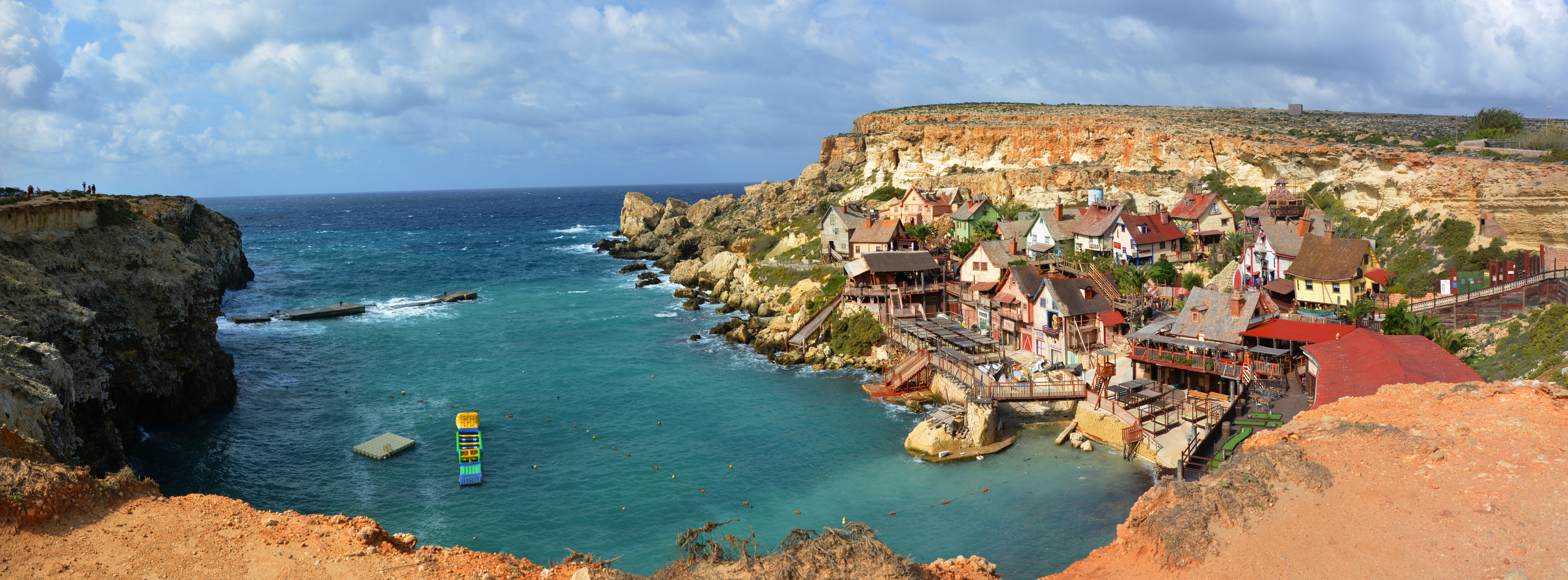
Popeye Village view

In addition, a 60–75 m (197–246 ft) breakwater was constructed around Anchor Bay's mouth to protect the set from the high seas during filming.

The set was completed in seven months, and filming commenced on 23 January 1980, and wrapped later that year on 19 June. The film, based on the comic strips by E. C. Segar, is set around the fictional village of Sweethaven, where Popeye the sailor arrives in an attempt to find his long-lost father.

Although the film had mixed reviews, Popeye Village remains a popular tourist attraction.

== Attractions ==
Popeye Village is open to the public seven days a week and, apart from the film set itself, has several family attractions for the visitor to experience. There are shows, rides, and museums, as well as playhouses where children can climb and explore the village. Children can meet the main characters from the movie, such as Popeye, Olive Oyl, Bluto, and Wimpy.

=== Set dressings and props ===
Some of the houses in Popeye Village have been equipped with various items related to the film's production, including props used in the movie.

=== Cinema ===
Situated in the centre of Popeye Village's Lower Complex, visitors can see a 15-minute history and information audio-visual show that includes clips from the actual film and the set's construction. The theater can accommodate approximately 40 people and has a show every hour.

Popeye Village hosts a variety of functions and activities at certain times of the year, including casual barbecue lunches and dinners.

=== Shows ===
Performers and animators provide regular entertainment for families while they are visiting the village, and many of these shows interact with the audience. They include:

- Puppet Show. Featuring five Popeye characters and the Puppet Master, the story is fully interactive with the children in the audience.
- Figaro. The barber of Sweethaven creates his miraculous and artistic hairstyles while singing happily to classical music.
- Jerry Sprinjer Show. This performance investigates an old secret that has been lurking in Sweethaven. Two "bodyguards" are chosen, and the audience has a chance to ask questions to discover the story's conclusion.
- Popeye and his Friends. A play featuring some famous and not-so-famous singers, each dance has been choreographed with attention to detail. It is this show where all the Popeye characters gather on stage to sing the Popeye theme song.
- Doctor Graves. Doctor Graves picks a member of the audience to try his experiment on. The audience member is sent to Hollywood.
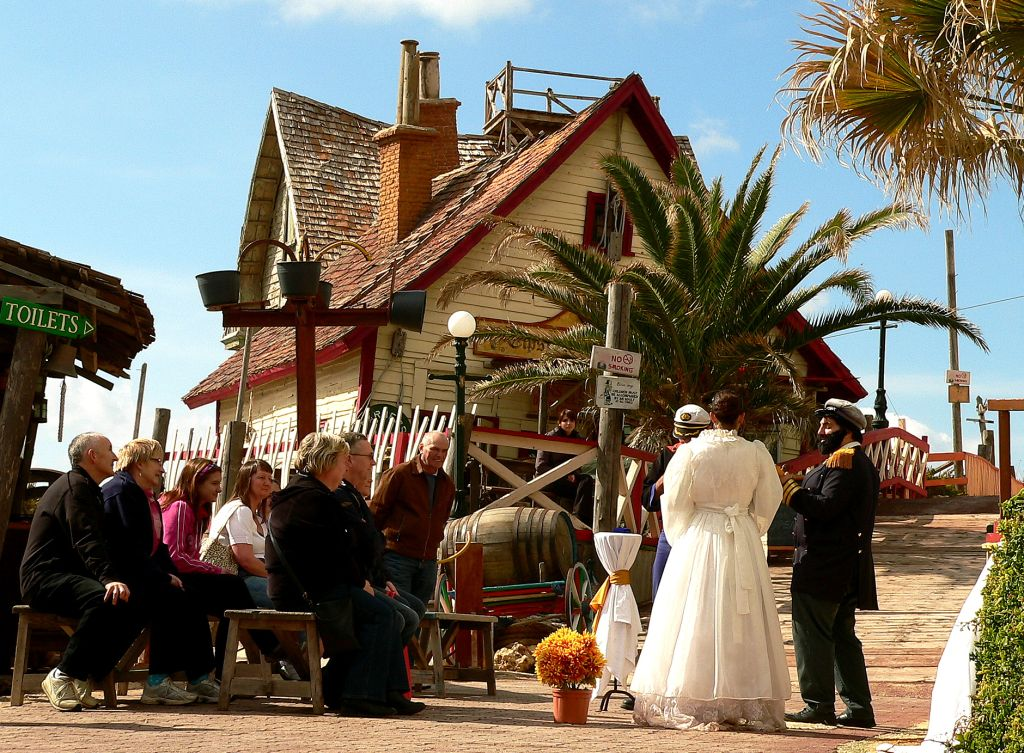
The show: The Wedding of Popeye and Olive Oyl

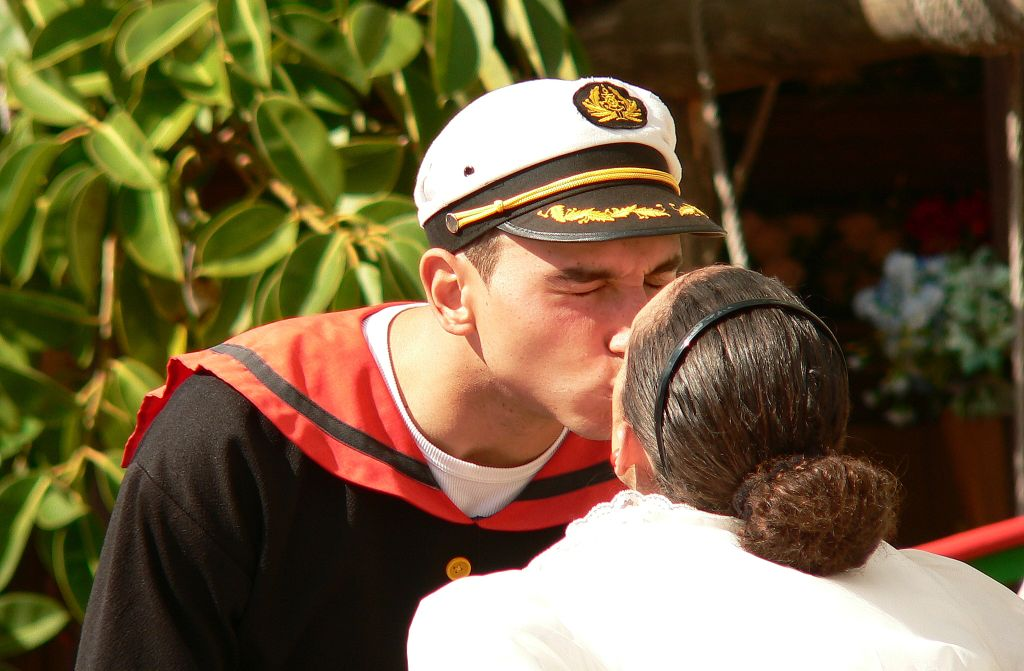
The show: The Wedding of Popeye and Olive Oyl

== Cyclone Helios storm damage ==
On 9 February 2023, the torrential rain inflicted on Malta by Cyclone Helios caused a large boulder to become dislodged from a cliff overlooking Popeye Village, causing significant damage to at least one of the film set structures. There were no reported casualties as the attraction had been closed due to the storm. It was closed while the extent of the damage was assessed and repairs were carried out to prevent further danger. The location reopened on 3 June 2023.

== See also ==
- Portmeirion
