= Brandon (given name) =

- Pronunciation: /ˈbrændən/ BRAN-dən
- Gender: Male
- Language: Old English, Old Irish

Origin
- Region of origin: England; Ireland

Other names
- Related names: Brendan, Brandy

Brandon is a masculine given name representing a transferred use of the English surname Brandon. The surname is toponymic in origin and may derive from any of various places in England named Brandon or Brundon. The place name in most cases derives from Old English brōm dūn, meaning "broom hill". An exception is Brandon, Lincolnshire, where the first element is the river name Brant.

There is also an Irish surname that coincides in form with the English one. It derives from Irish (Mac) Breandáin, meaning "son of Breandán".

The given name Brandy was likely invented as a feminine form of Brandon.

== Statistics ==
=== Australia ===
In Australia's most populated state, New South Wales, in the year 2009, Brandon did not crack the top 100 male, or top 100 female, names of babies registered in New South Wales.

=== Canada ===
In the Canadian province of British Columbia, the name ranked as the 66th most popular male name for the year 2007; it did not rank as a female name (to rank the name had to have been used by 5 or more occurrences).

=== Chile ===
In Chile, the name has not cracked the top 50 male names in the years spanning 1999 to 2006; from 2003 to 2006 it was amongst the top 100 male names.

Rank and percent of the male name

Year	1999	2000	2001	2002	2003	2004	2005	2006
Rank	>50	>50	>50	>50	62	63	67	70
Percent					0.18	0.17	0.16	0.14

=== The Netherlands ===
In the year 2009, Brandon was the 160th most common male name, recorded in births, in the Netherlands; there were 67 occurrences of the name recorded that year. The previous year the name ranked 159th, with 73 recorded occurrences.

=== Republic of Ireland ===
Rank of male Irish baby births, and rank of male Irish names

Year	1998	1999	2000	2001	2002	2003	2004	2005	2006	2007	2008
Rank (births)	67	89	88	67	92	80	85	63	84	74	75
Rank (total)	74	67	67	83	70	76	78	98	79	97	101

=== Sweden ===
In Sweden, there were 230 males registered in 2009 who had the first name Brandon; of these men, 170 recorded the name as a nickname. In the years spanning 2002 to 2009, the name was not amongst the top 100 male, or female, baby names.

=== United Kingdom ===
In the United Kingdom, the name has risen in popularity since the mid-1990s.

==== England and Wales ====
In England and Wales, in the year 2008, Brandon was the 70th most common male baby name, along with Breasen being a form of Brandon or meaning son of Brandon, with 1,011 occurrences recorded. It had fallen in rank, slightly from the previous year when it was ranked 66th most common, with 1161 occurrences. The name has dramatically fallen in popularity since 1998, when it was ranked 36th, with 2142 occurrences recorded.

Rank and numbers of English and Welsh baby births

Year	1998	1999	2000	2001	2002	2003	2004	2005	2006	2007	2008
Rank	36	35	35	37	37	40	44	47	54	66	70
Count										1,161	1,011

==== Northern Ireland ====
In Northern Ireland, Brandon was not amongst the top 20 names of male, or female, babies born in the year 2009. It did not crack the top 100 male, or the top 100 female, names registered in the two previous years either. In 2002 the name was ranked 84 most common male baby name, falling drastically from 30th ranked name the year before.

Rank and numbers of male Northern Irish baby births

The name did not rank amongst the top 100 male baby names in 2007 and 2008.

Year	1999	2000	2001	2002	2003	2004	2005	2006	2007	2008
Rank	70	59	56	84	88	74	89	97	-	-
Count	42	51	54	30	31	40	33	33	-	-

==== Scotland ====
In Scotland, in the year 2009, the name was ranked as the 90th most common names for male babies, with 67 occurrences recorded. The name had dramatically fallen in popularity from the previous year. In the years 1998 and 1999, the name was the 46th most common name for male births, although the name has fallen in rank in almost every year since then.

Rank and percent of male Scottish baby births

Year	1900	1950	1975	1997	1998	1999	2000	2001	2002	2003	2004	2005	2006	2007	2008	2009
Rank	>100	>100	>100	53	52	46	46	49	53	61	53	61	65	75	71	90
Count	>100	>100	>100	149	142	173	161	153	138	138	108	110	105	88	98	67

=== United States ===
The name is, for the most part, found in North America. In 1982, the name was the 7th most common given name amongst African American males, and the 23rd most common name amongst White American males. The name was ranked in the 1990 United States census as being the 68th most common name amongst males.

The Social Security Administration website lists the top 1,000 American baby names for every year since 1879. In the year 1950, Brandon first reached the top 1,000 male names for babies who were registered for Social Security numbers for births. That year it was the 936th most common masculine name. From that year until the beginning of the 1990s, the name has, for the most part, risen in popularity with every successive year. It reached its peak in the years 1992, 1993, and 1994, when it was the 6th most popular name amongst male babies. The name has fallen in popularity in almost every year since then; in 2009, it was ranked the 38th most common name registered that year.

Brandon is considered to be a very masculine name; however, in the United States it has also been used as a feminine name. In 1981, it reached the top 1,000 female names for babies who were registered for Social Security numbers for births; that year it was the 748th most common female name registered for births. The name stayed within the top 1,000 female names from 1981 to 1988, fluctuating in rank; it reached its peak in 1985, when it ranked 661st; in 1988, it ranked 990th.

In 2009, the names Brandon and Bryan were ranked as the 15th most common names for male twins, according to Social Security number applications for births.

Years when the name ranked amongst the top 1,000 American baby names

The following table lists the year and rank when Brandon ranked amongst the top 1,000 male, or the top 1,000 female, baby names in the United States. If no rank is given in the table, then the name was not amongst the top 1,000. The highest rank for males, and for females, is labelled in boldface.

Year	1950	1951	1952	1953	1954	1955	1956	1957	1958	1959	1960	1961	1962	1963	1964	1965	1966	1967	1968	1969
Rank (male)	936	985	812	662	583	723	585	666	661	567	577	565	566	498	455	393	379	341	263	217

Year	1970	1971	1972	1973	1974	1975	1976	1977	1978	1979	1980	1981	1982	1983	1984	1985	1986	1987	1988	1989
Rank (male)	131	95	63	58	51	44	40	41	40	35	30	19	18	17	15	13	13	14	17	18
Rank (female)	-	-	-	-	-	-	-	-	-	-	-	748	804	683	706	**661**	683	806	990	-

Year	1990	1991	1992	1993	1994	1995	1996	1997	1998	1999	2000	2001	2002	2003	2004	2005	2006	2007	2008	2009
Rank (male)	19	15	**6**	7	**6**	8	8	7	7	11	12	18	20	21	22	27	27	31	33	38
Year	2010	2011	2012	2013	2014	2015	2016	2017	2018	2019	2020	2021	2022	2023	2024					
Rank (male)	44	47	56	70	71	83	99	114	124	141	167	181	211							

== People with the name Brandon ==
=== Academia ===
- Brandon Carter (born 1942), Australian theoretical physicist
- Brandon Centerwall (born 1954), American epidemiologist and former professor of psychiatry and behavioral sciences
- Brandon Garrett (born 1975), American professor of law
- Brandon Plewe, American geographer and associate professor of geography
- Brandon R. Byrd, American academic and historian

=== Art ===
- Brandon Breaux (born 1983), American multi-disciplinary artist
- Brandon LaBelle (born 1969), American artist and sound theorist

=== Business ===
- Brandon Anderson, American sociologist and entrepreneur
- Brandon Blackwood, American fashion designer and businessman
- Brandon Gough (1937–2012), British businessman and college chancellor
- Brandon Judd, American president of the National Border Patrol Council
- Brandon Metcalf (born 1986), American record producer and entrepreneur
- Brandon Nicholson (born 1983/1984), American nonprofit chief executive
- Brandon Schantz (1980–2007), American broadcaster, sports director, and television producer
- Brandon Schneider, American sports executive
- Brandon Silverstein (born 1991), American entrepreneur
- Brandon Sosna (c. 1992–1993), American sports administrator and executive
- Brandon Steiner (born 1959), American sports marketer
- Brandon Tartikoff (1949–1997), American television executive
- Brandon Taubman (born 1985/1986), American former MLB executive and former investment banker
- Brandon Topham (born 1971), South African politician and businessman
- Brandon Truaxe (1978–2019), Iranian-Canadian computer scientist and entrepreneur
- Brandon Wade (born 1970), American businessman

=== Crime ===
- Brandon Bernard (1980–2020), American criminal executed for murder
- Brandon Hedrick (1979–2006), American executed for murder and rape
- Brandon Mendoza (1982-2014), American police officer whom a drunk driver killed
- Brandon Pettit (born 1987), American convicted murderer
- Brandon Russell (born 1995), Bahamian and American Neo-Nazi leader
- Brandon Teena (1972-1993), American murder victim
- Brandon Tholmer (born 1949), American serial killer and rapist

=== Entertainment ===
- Brandon, American Latin freestyle-pop artist
- Brandon Ash-Mohammed, Canadian stand-up comedian
- Brandon Auret (born 1972), South African actor
- Brandon Baker (born 1985), American former actor
- Brandon Barash (born 1979), American actor
- Brandon Beal (born 1983), American singer, songwriter, and producer
- Brandon Beemer (born 1980), American actor
- Brandon Block (born 1967), British club DJ, producer, and remixer
- Brandon Blue Hamilton (born 1987), American record producer
- Brandon Bolmer (born 1986), American singer-songwriter, music producer, and visual artist
- Brandon Boyd (born 1976), American musician
- Brandon Broady (born 1986), American comedian, actor, and television host
- Brandon Burke, Australian actor
- Brandon Butler (born 1996), American actor
- Brandon C. Rodegeb (born 1977), American music executive, film maker, and rap artist
- Brandon Call (born 1976), American former television- and film actor
- Brandon Campbell, American music composer for film, TV, and video games
- Brandon Cronenberg (born 1980), Canadian director and screenwriter
- Brandon Cruz (born 1962), American musician, actor, editor, and consultant
- Brandon Curtis, American member of space rock band The Secret Machines
- Brandon Cutler (born 1987), American professional wrestler
- Brandon Darner, American record producer, songwriter, and musician
- Brandon Decker (born 1980), American singer-songwriter
- Brandon deWilde (1942–1972), American theater-, film-, and television actor
- Brandon DiCamillo (born 1976), American former television personality, actor, stunt performer, and filmmaker
- Brandon Dickerson, American writer, director, and producer
- Brandon Douglas (born 1968), American actor
- Brandon Ewing (born 1991), American live streamer, YouTuber, and speedrunner
- Brandon Fellows (born 1994 or 1995), English actor
- Brandon Fields (born 1958), American saxophonist, flutist, and clarinetist
- Brandon Firla, Canadian actor and comedian
- Brandon Flowers (born 1981), American musician, singer, songwriter, and philanthropist
- Brandon Flynn (born 1993), American actor
- Brandon Fobbs (born 1981), American actor
- Brandon Gatson (born 1984), American professional wrestler
- Brandon Green (born 1988), birth name of Maejor, American record producer, rapper, singer, and songwriter
- Brandon Hammond (born 1984), American former child actor
- Brandon Hardesty (born 1987), American comedic performer and actor
- Brandon Heath (born 1978), American contemporary Christian musician, singer, and songwriter
- Brandon Howard (born 1981), birth name of B Howard, American singer, record producer, and songwriter
- Brandon Hurst (1866–1947), English stage- and film actor
- Brandon J. Dirden (born 1978), American actor
- Brandon Jay McLaren (born 1980), Canadian actor
- Brandon Jenner (born 1981), American musician, singer, songwriter, and television personality
- Brandon Jovanovich (born 1970), American operatic tenor
- Brandon Keener (born 1974), American actor
- Brandon Kellum (born 1985), American musician, songwriter, author, and philanthropist
- Brandon Killham (born 1997), American actor
- Brandon Korn (born 1991), birth name of Bkorn, American record producer
- Brandon Laatsch, American game developer, filmmaker, and YouTuber
- Brandon Lake (born 1990), American Christian worship singer, songwriter, guitarist, and worship pastor
- Brandon Larned, birth name of Seagull, American video game streamer and retired professional Overwatch player
- Brandon Larracuente (born 1994), American actor
- Brandon Leake (born 1992), American spoken word poet, educator, and motivational speaker
- Brandon Ludwig (born 1990), Canadian actor
- Brandon Maggart (born 1933), American actor, painter, and author
- Brandon Maxwell (born 1984), American fashion designer, television personality, director, and photographer
- Brandon McCartney (born 1989), birth name of Lil B, American rapper
- Brandon McInnis, American voice actor
- Brandon Mig, Canadian pop singer
- Brandon Montrell (1979–2022), American comedian
- Brandon Niederauer (born 2003), American guitarist and actor
- Brandon Oakes (born 1972), Akwesasne actor, artist, and dancer
- Brandon Oldenburg, American filmmaker and illustrator
- Brandon P. Bell (born 1985), American actor
- Brandon Paak Anderson (born 1986), birth name of Anderson .Paak, American rapper, singer, songwriter, record producer, and drummer
- Brandon Paddock, American pop and rock musician and producer
- Brandon Paris (born 1971), Canadian singer and songwriter
- Brandon Patrick George, American flutist
- Brandon Patton, American game designer and musician
- Brandon Peniche (born 1987), Mexican actor
- Brandon Perlman (born 1989/1990), birth name of American musician Delroy Edwards
- Brandon Pertzborn (born 1994), American drummer
- Brandon Potter (born 1982), American voice actor
- Brandon Proctor, American sound engineer
- Brandon Quinn (born 1977), American television and film actor
- Brandon Rhyder, American country singer
- Brandon Ross, American jazz guitarist
- Brandon Routh (born 1979), American actor
- Brandon Saller (born 1983), American musician, singer, and multi-instrumentalist
- Brandon Santini (born 1982), American roots rock and blues harmonica player, singer, and songwriter
- Brandon Scott (born 1981), American actor, voice actor, and producer
- Brandon Silvestry (born 1979), birth name of Low Ki, American professional wrestler
- Brandon Sklenar (born 1992), American actor
- Brandon Slagle, American filmmaker and former actor
- Brandon Spinelly, Mauritian radio jockey
- Brandon Stirling Baker (born 1987), American lighting designer
- Brandon Stoddard (1937–2014), American television executive
- Brandon T. Snider, American writer and actor
- Brandon Tate, American member of professional wrestling tag team The Tate Twins
- Brandon Tauszik (born 1986), American photographer and filmmaker
- Brandon Tory, American rapper, songwriter, record producer, software engineer, and entrepreneur
- Brandon Trost (born 1981), American cinematographer, screenwriter, and film director
- Brandon Tynan (1875–1967), Irish-born American stage- and screen actor
- Brandon Uranowitz (born 1986), American actor, dancer, and singer
- Brandon Vietti (born 1974), American animator, director, and producer
- Brandon Walters (born 1996), Indigenous Australian actor
- Brandon Woods (born 1998), Australian violinist, composer, and music producer

=== Health ===
- Brandon Colby, American physician, geneticist, and medical writer
- Brandon del Pozo (born 1974), American assistant professor of medicine and health; former chief of police
- Brandon Gaut, American evolutionary biologist, geneticist, and professor
- Brandon Ogbunu, American computational biologist and professor

=== Law ===
- Brandon Mayfield (born 1966), Muslim-American convert and lawyer
- Brandon Moss (1909–1999), British police officer
- Brandon Scott Long (born 1976), American lawyer
- Brandon Yosha (born 1993), American trial lawyer

=== Literature ===
- Brandon Bays (born 1953), American author and motivational speaker
- Brandon Boyer (born 1977), American weblog editor
- Brandon Choi, American comic book writer
- Brandon Darby (born 1976), American blogger and activist
- Brandon Graham (born 1976), American comic book creator
- Brandon Hobson, Native American writer and professor
- Brandon Jerwa (born 1973), American comic book writer and musician
- Brandon M. Easton, American professional writer, screenwriter, and educator
- Brandon Massey (born 1973), American writer of thriller fiction
- Brandon Mull (born 1974), American author
- Brandon Peterson (born 1969), American comic book writer and artist
- Brandon Q. Morris (born 1966), German writer of hard science-fiction
- Brandon Sanderson (born 1975), American author of high fantasy and science fiction
- Brandon Scott Sessoms (born 1981), birth name of B. Scott, American television personality, radio show host, and Internet celebrity
- Brandon Sheffield, American video game director and webcomic writer
- Brandon Stanton (born 1984), American author, photographer, and blogger
- Brandon Stickney (born 1967), American journalist, author, and documentarian
- Brandon Voss, American journalist and entertainment writer

=== Military ===
- Brandon Neely, American former army guard
- Brandon Webb (born 1974), American former Navy SEAL and current media commentator

=== Politics ===
- Brandon Achor (born 1988/1989), American politician
- Brandon Beach (born 1961), American politician
- Brandon Chafee, American politician
- Brandon Chrostowski, American chef, restaurateur, and politician
- Brandon Creighton (born 1970), American attorney and politician
- Brandon Dillon (politician) (born 1972), American politician
- Brandon Dukes, American politician
- Brandon Elefante (born 1985/1986), American politician
- Brandon Ellington (born 1980), American politician
- Brandon Gill (born 1994), American politician
- Brandon Golding, South African politician
- Brandon Guffey (born 1980), American politician
- Brandon Grove (1929-2016), American diplomat, writer, and ambassador
- Brandon Herrera (born 1995), American YouTuber and politician
- Brandon Hixon (1981-2018), American politician
- Brandon Ler (born 1985), American politician
- Brandon Lewis (born 1971), British politician
- Brandon Lofton (born 1978), American politician
- Brandon Lunty, Canadian politician
- Brandon Markosek, American politician
- Brandon McGee, American politician
- Brandon Neuman, American politician
- Brandon Newton (born 1994), American politician
- Brandon Ogles (born 1976), American former politician
- Brandon Phelps (born 1970), American politician
- Brandon Phinney (born 1988), American politician
- Brandon Pillay (born 1981/1982), South African politician
- Brandon Potter (born 1984), American politician
- Brandon Presley (born 1977), American politician
- Brandon Prichard (born 2001), American politician
- Brandon Reed (born 1980), American politician
- Brandon Sakbun (born 1996), American former army captain and current mayor
- Brandon Scott (born 1984), American politician
- Brandon Shaffer (born 1971), American former politician
- Brandon Steele (born 1981), American politician
- Brandon J. Storm (born 1976), American attorney and politician
- Brandon Strong, American politician
- Brandon Todd (politician) (born 1983), American lobbyist and former politician
- Brandon Umba (born 1985), American politician
- Brandon Vick (born 1984), American politician
- Brandon Voas (born 1993), American politician
- Brandon Wales, American national security official
- Brandon Whipple (born 1982), American politician and academic
- Brandon Woodard (born 1990), American politician
- Brandon Woolf (born 1972), American politician

=== Religion ===
- Brandon Crouch (born 1983), American Christian evangelist, youth speaker, and television broadcaster

=== Sports ===
- Brandon Agounon (born 1994), French professional footballer
- Brandon Aguilera (born 2003), Costa Rican professional footballer
- Brandon Aiyuk (born 1998), American NFL player
- Brandon Alexander (born 1993), Canadian CFL player
- Brandon Anderson (footballer) (born 1985), American former NFL player
- Brandon Archer (born 1983), American former NFL- and IFL player
- Brandon Armstrong (basketball) (born 1980), American retired NBA player
- Brandon Armstrong (dancer) (born 1994), American professional dancer
- Brandon Ash (born 1977), American professional stock car racing driver
- Brandon Ashley (born 1994), American BSN-, NBL-, and NBA player
- Brandon Aubrey (born 1995), American NFL player
- Brandon Austin (born 1999), English professional footballer
- Brandon Ayerdis (born 1994), Nicaraguan professional footballer
- Brandon Backe (born 1978), American former MLB pitcher
- Brandon Baddock (born 1995), Canadian NHL- and AHL player
- Brandon Bair (born 1984), American former NFL player
- Brandon Baiye (born 2000), Belgian professional footballer
- Brandon Banks (born 1987), American Canadian CFL- and NFL player
- Brandon Banks (defensive lineman) (born 1994), American NFL- and CFL player
- Brandon Bantz (born 1987), American former MLB catcher
- Brandon Barden (born 1989), American NFL player
- Brandon Barker (born 1996), English professional footballer
- Brandon Barkhuizen (born 1990), South African former PSL player
- Brandon Barklage (born 1986), American soccer player
- Brandon Barlow (born 1998), American CFL player
- Brandon Barriera (born 2004), American MLB pitcher
- Brandon Barzey (born 1999), English footballer
- Brandon Bass (born 1985), American former NBA player
- Brandon Beachy (born 1986), American former MLB pitcher
- Brandon Beane (born 1976), American NFL general manager
- Brandon Belt (born 1988), American MLB player
- Brandon Bender (born 1987), Italian-American mixed martial artist
- Brandon Bennett (born 1973), American former NFL player
- Brandon Beresford (born 1992), American-born Guyanese professional footballer
- Brandon Berger (born 1975), American former MLB player
- Brandon Bernstein (born 1972), American former drag racing driver
- Brandon Bess (born 1987), Guyanese former international cricketer
- Brandon Bielak (born 1996), American MLB pitcher
- Brandon Bing (born 1989), American former NFL player
- Brandon Biro (born 1998), Canadian NHL player
- Brandon Bochenski (born 1982), American former NHL- and KHL player
- Brandon Boggs (born 1983), American former MLB player
- Brandon Boggs (basketball) (born 1992), American professional basketball player
- Brandon Bogotay (born 1989), American NFL player
- Brandon Bolden (born 1990), American NFL player
- Brandon Bollig (born 1987), American former NHL player
- Brandon Bonifacio (born 1989), Canadian soccer player
- Brandon Boor (born 1988), Australian former rugby league footballer
- Brandon Borrello (born 1995), Australian professional soccer player
- Brandon Bostick (born 1989), American former NFL player
- Brandon Boston Jr. (born 2001), American NBA player
- Brandon Boudreaux (born 1989), Canadian CFL player
- Brandon Bowman (born 1984), American NBL player, in the Israeli Liga Artzit
- Brandon Boykin (born 1990), American former NFL player
- Brandon Brennan (born 1991), American MLB pitcher
- Brandon Brewer (born 1984), Canadian professional boxer
- Brandon Bridge (born 1992), Canadian former CFL player
- Brandon Briones (born 2001), American artistic gymnast
- Brandon Browner (born 1984), American former NFL player and convicted felon
- Brandon Buck (born 1988), Canadian former DEL player
- Brandon Burks (born 1993), American NFL and CFL player
- Brandon Burlon (born 1990), Canadian NHL- and ICEHL player
- Brandon Burlsworth (1976-1999), American college football player
- Brandon Burton (born 1989), American NFL coach and former player
- Brandon Bussi (born 1998), American AHL- and NHL player
- Brandon Bye (born 1995), American MLS player
- Brandon Cablay (born 1978), Filipino-American former AMC- and PBA player
- Brandon Caleb (born 1987), American NFL- and AFL player
- Brandon Calver (born 1993), Canadian CFL player
- Brandon Cambridge (born 2002), American MLS player
- Brandon Cantu (born 1981), American professional poker player
- Brandon Carlo (born 1996), American NHL player
- Brandon Carnes (born 1995), American track and field athlete
- Brandon Carr (born 1986), American former NFL player
- Brandon Carswell (born 1989), American former NFL player
- Brandon Carter (American football) (born 1986), American former NFL player
- Brandon Cash (born 1980), American mixed martial artist
- Brandon Cavitt (born 1973), American retired USISL-, CISL-, WISL-, and MISL player
- Brandon Chebby (born 2000), English-born Burundian footballer
- Brandon Chillar (born 1982), American former NFL player
- Brandon Cisse (born 2005), American football player
- Brandon Clarke (1996–2026), Canadian-American basketball player
- Brandon Clarke (chess player) (born 1995), English chess player
- Brandon Claussen (born 1979), American former MLB pitcher
- Brandon Cleveland (born 2004), American NFL player
- Brandon Cole (born 1984), American professional basketball player
- Brandon Coleman (wide receiver) (born 1992), American former NFL player
- Brandon Coleman (offensive lineman) (born 2000), American football player
- Brandon Collier (born 1985), American former NFL and CFL player
- Brandon Collins (born 1989), American NFL-, CFL-, and AFL player
- Brandon Collymore (born 1999), American professional wrestler
- Brandon Comley (born 1995), English professional footballer
- Brandon Convery (born 1974), Canadian former NHL player
- Brandon Cooper (born 2000), Welsh EFL player
- Brandon Corp (born 1987), American MLL player
- Brandon Cortés (born 2001), Argentine professional footballer
- Brandon Costin (born 1972), Australian former NRL- and USARL player
- Brandon Costner (born 1987), American NBA-, NBL-, and RBL player
- Brandon Cottom (born 1992), American former NFL player, security specialist, and contestant on Survivor (American TV series)
- Brandon Coupe (born 1972), American former professional tennis player
- Brandon Couts (born 1979), American former sprinter
- Brandon Coutu (born 1984), American former NFL player
- Brandon Cover (born 2003), English professional footballer
- Brandon Cox (born 1983), American former college football player
- Brandon Crawford (born 1987), American MLB player
- Brandon Crombeen (born 1985), American-born Canadian former NHL player
- Brandon Cumpton (born 1988), American former MLB pitcher
- Brandon Cunniff (born 1988), American MLB pitcher
- Brandon Curran (born 1980), American USL player
- Brandon Curry (born 1982), American professional bodybuilder
- Brandon Dang (born 2005), American artistic gymnast
- Brandon Daniels (born 1978), American former AFL player
- Brandon Daord (born 1997), English professional boxer
- Brandon Davidson (born 1991), Canadian SHL player and former NHL player
- Brandon Davies (born 1991), American-born Ugandan professional basketball player
- Brandon Davis (born 1990), American mixed martial artist
- Brandon Deaderick (born 1987), American former NFL player
- Brandon DeFazio (born 1988), Canadian retired DEL player
- Brandon Denson (born 1987), American former CFL- and AFL player
- Brandon Deville (born 1993), Belgian footballer
- Brandon Díaz (born 1992), Mexican freestyle wrestler
- Brandon Dickson (born 1984), American former MLB pitcher
- Brandon Dietrich (born 1978), Canadian DEL player
- Brandon Dillon (American football) (born 1997), American NFL player
- Brandon Doman (born 1976), American NFL player and coach
- Brandon Domingues (born 2000), French professional footballer
- Brandon Dorlus (born 2001), American football player
- Brandon Doughty (born 1991), American former NFL player
- Brandon Douglas (rugby league) (born 1997), English professional rugby league footballer
- Brandon Drury (born 1992), American MLB player
- Brandon Dubinsky (born 1986), American former NHL player
- Brandon Duckworth (born 1976), American former MLB- and NPB pitcher
- Brandon Duhaime (born 1997), American NHL player
- Brandon Dunn (born 1992), American NFL player
- Brandon Durham, American streetball player
- Brandon Edwards (born 1991), American LNB Pro B player
- Brandon Ellis (born 1993), Australian AFL player
- Brandon Erwin (born 1975), American racecar driver
- Brandon Escobar (born 1990), Honduran American wrestler
- Brandon Ess (born 1971), German cricketer
- Brandon Estrada (born 1987), American pole vaulter
- Brandon Facyson (born 1994), American NFL player
- Brandon Fahey (born 1981), American former MLB player
- Brandon Feehery (born 1992), American professional racing cyclist
- Brandon Fernandes (born 1994), Indian ISL player
- Brandon Fields (American football) (born 1984), American former NFL player
- Brandon Figueroa (born 1996), American professional boxer
- Brandon Finnegan (born 1993), American MLB pitcher
- Brandon Flowers (American football) (born 1986), American former NFL player
- Brandon Ford (born 1989), American former NFL player
- Brandon Forsyth (born 1979), American former competitive ice dancer
- Brandon Fortenberry (born 1990), American NBL player
- Brandon Foster (born 1984), American former NFL- and CFL player
- Brandon Fusco (born 1988), American former NFL player
- Brandon Ganuelas-Rosser (born 1994), Filipino-American PBA player
- Brandon Garbe (born 1981), American former minor league baseball player
- Brandon Garrison (born 2004), American college basketball player
- Brandon Gaudin (born 1983), American television broadcaster
- Brandon Gdovic (born 1992), American professional racing driver
- Brandon George (born 2001), American football player
- Brandon Ghee (born 1987), American former NFL player
- Brandon Gibson (born 1987), American former NFL player
- Brandon Gignac (born 1997), Canadian AHL player
- Brandon Gilbeck (born 1996), American CEBL- and ASEAN player
- Brandon Girtz (born 1985), American mixed martial artist
- Brandon Glover (born 1997), Dutch-South African cricketer
- Brandon Gomes (born 1984), American former MLB pitcher and current baseball executive
- Brandon Gonzáles (born 1984), American former professional boxer
- Brandon Goodship (born 1994), English footballer
- Brandon Gorin (born 1978), American former NFL player
- Brandon Gormley (born 1992), Canadian DEL player, and former NHL-, SHL-, and KHL player
- Brandon Graham (born 1988), American NFL player
- Brandon Green (born 1980), American former NFL player
- Brandon Greene (born 1994), American former NFL- and AAF player
- Brandon Grosso (born 2000), American professional stock car racing driver
- Brandon Guillory (born 1983), Canadian former NFL- and CFL player
- Brandon Guyer (born 1986), American former MLB player
- Brandon Hagel (born 1998), Canadian NHL player, and former WHL player
- Brandon Hagy (born 1991), American professional golfer
- Brandon Halsey (born 1986), American professional mixed martial artist
- Brandon Halverson (born 1996), American AHL player, and former NHL player
- Brandon Hamilton (born 1972), Canadian former CFL player
- Brandon Hancock (born 1983), American sports journalist and former college football player
- Brandon Hanlan (born 1997), English professional footballer
- Brandon Hardin (born 1989), American former NFL player
- Brandon Harkins (born 1986), American professional golfer
- Brandon Harper (born 1976), American former MLB player
- Brandon Harris (born 1990), American former NFL- and CFL player, and current coach
- Brandon Harris (quarterback) (born 1995), American former college football player
- Brandon Harrison (born 1985), American former AFC player
- Brandon Hartson (born 1989), American NFL player
- Brandon Haunstrup (born 1996), English professional footballer
- Brandon Hawk (born 1979), American former professional tennis player
- Brandon Heath (basketball) (born 1984), American NBA-, APOEL-, and PLK player
- Brandon Hepburn (born 1989), American former NFL player
- Brandon Hicks (born 1985), American former MLB player
- Brandon Hightower (born 1998), American professional racing driver
- Brandon Hiini (born 1981), New Zealand cricketer
- Brandon Hill (American football) (born 2000), American NFL player
- Brandon Hogan (born 1988), American former NFL- and CFL player
- Brandon Holiday (born 1972), American Paracanoe sprint kayaker
- Brandon Holt (born 1998), American ATP player
- Brandon Hudgins (born 1987), American middle-distance runner
- Brandon Hunt, American NFL executive and former coach
- Brandon Hunter (1980-2023), American NBA player
- Brandon Huntley-Hatfield (born 2003), American college basketball player
- Brandon Hyde (born 1973), American MLB manager
- Brandon Inge (born 1977), American former MLB player and current volunteer assistant coach
- Brandon Ingram (born 1997), American NBA player
- Brandon Inniss (born 2004), American college football player
- Brandon Isaac (born 1984), Canadian former AFL- and CFL player
- Brandon Jack (born 1994), Australian author, journalist, and former AFL player
- Brandon Jacobs (born 1982), American former NFL player
- Brandon Jacobs (born 1990), American former MLB player
- Brandon Jacobson (born 2003), American chess player
- Brandon James (born 1987), American former NFL- and CFL player
- Brandon Jamison (born 1981), American former NFL player
- Brandon Jefferson (born 1991), American NBA- and CBA player
- Brandon Jennings (born 1989), American former NBA player
- Brandon Jennings (born 1978), American former NFL player
- Brandon John (born 1995), Canadian USL player
- Brandon Joseph (born 2001), American NFL player
- Brandon Joseph-Buadi (born 1997), English professional footballer
- Brandon Joyce (1984-2010), American NFL-, CFL-, and UFL player
- Brandon Jung (born 1986), Canadian water polo player
- Brandon Kaufman (born 1990), American former NFL-, CFL-, AFL-, and USAFL player
- Brandon Kavanagh (born 2000), Irish professional footballer
- Brandon Keith (born 1984), American former NFL player
- Brandon Khela (born 2005), English EFL player.
- Brandon King (born 1994), Jamaican and West Indies cricketer
- Brandon Kintzler (born 1984), American former MLB pitcher
- Brandon Kirsch (born 1983), American former AFL- and IFL player
- Brandon Knight (born 1991), American former NBA player, current NBL player
- Brandon Knupp (born 1986), American former stock car racing driver
- Brandon Kolb (born 1973), American former MLB pitcher
- Brandon Kozun (born 1990), American-born Canadian NHL player, and former KHL-, WHL-, and CHL player
- Brandon Labrosse (born 1999), Seychellois international footballer
- Brandon LaFell (born 1986), American former NFL player
- Brandon Laird (born 1987), American professional baseball player in India, and former MLB- and NPB player
- Brandon Laird (basketball) (born 1970s), American college basketball coach and former player
- Brandon Lang (born 1986), American AFL- and CFL player
- Brandon Larson (born 1976), American former MLB player
- Brandon Lauton (born 2000), South African-Australian professional soccer player
- Brandon League (born 1983), American former MLB pitcher
- Brandon Leibrandt (born 1992), American MLB pitcher
- Brandon Linder (born 1992), American former NFL player
- Brandon Lindsey (born 1989), American NFL- and CFL player
- Brandon Lloyd (born 1981), American former NFL player
- Brandon Lockridge (born 1997), American minor league baseball player
- Brandon London (born 1984), Canadian retired CFL- and NFL player
- Brandon Loschiavo (born 1997), American diver
- Brandon Loupos (born 1993), Australian BMX cyclist
- Brandon Lowe (born 1994), American MLB player
- Brandon Lundy (born 1996), Australian APL- and APIA player
- Brandon Lynch (born 1982), American former NFL player and current coach
- Brandon Lynn (born 1995), American racing driver
- Brandon Lyon (born 1979), American former MLB pitcher
- Brandon Lyons (born 1990), American Para-cyclist
- Brandon Magee (born 1990), American former NFL player
- Brandon Maïsano (born 1993), French former racing driver
- Brandon Mann (born 1984), American former NPB- and MLB pitcher
- Brandon Manning (born 1990), Canadian DEL player, and former NHL player
- Brandon Manumaleuna (born 1980), American former NFL player
- Brandon Manzonelli (born 1989), American soccer player
- Brandon Margera (born 1979), American former professional skateboarder, stunt performer, television personality, and filmmaker
- Brandon Marino (born 1986), American former ECHL player
- Brandon Marklund (born 1996), Canadian professional baseball pitcher
- Brandon Marshall (born 1984), American former NFL player
- Brandon Marshall (linebacker) (born 1989), American former NFL player
- Brandon Marsh (baseball) (born 1997), American MLB player
- Brandon Mashinter (born 1988), Canadian former AHL player
- Brandon Mason (born 1997), English professional footballer
- Brandon Matera (born 1992), Australian former AFL player
- Brandon Matthews (born 1994), American PGA Tour player
- Brandon Maurer (born 1990), American former MLB pitcher
- Brandon Mavuta (born 1997), Zimbabwean cricketer
- Brandon Maxwell (born 1991), American professional ice hockey goaltender
- Brandon Maye (born 1989), American college football player
- Brandon McBride (born 1994), Canadian track and field athlete
- Brandon McCarthy (born 1983), American former MLB pitcher
- Brandon McCoy (born 1998), American BSN- and BNXT player
- Brandon McGee (born 1990), American former NFL player
- Brandon McGowan (born 1983), American former NFL player
- Brandon McIlwain (born 1998), American MLB player
- Brandon McKinney (born 1983), American former NFL player
- Brandon McManus (born 1991), American NFL player
- Brandon McMillan (born 1990), Canadian KHL- and NHL player
- Brandon McMullen (born 1999), South African-born Scottish cricketer
- Brandon McNulty (born 1998), American cyclist
- Brandon McPherson (born 2002), English professional footballer
- Brandon McRae (born 1986), American former NFL-, UFL-, AFL-, and CFL player
- Brandon McReynolds (born 1991), American professional stock car racing driver
- Brandon Mebane (born 1985), American former NFL player
- Brandon Mechele (born 1993), Belgian professional footballer
- Brandon Medders (born 1980), American former MLB relief pitcher
- Brandon Meriweather (born 1984), American former NFL player
- Brandon Middleton (born 1981), American former NFL- and CFL player
- Brandon Miele (born 1994), Irish former professional footballer
- Brandon Minor (born 1988), American former NFL player
- Brandon Miree (born 1981), American former NFL player
- Brandon Montour (born 1994), Canadian NHL player
- Brandon Moreno (born 1993), Mexican professional mixed martial artist
- Brandon Morrow (born 1984), American former MLB pitcher
- Brandon Mosley (born 1988), American former NFL player
- Brandon Moss (born 1983), American former MLB player
- Brandon Moss (born 1984), American former MLS player
- Brandon Mouton (born 1981), American former college basketball player
- Brandon Mroz (born 1990), American former competitive figure skater
- Brandon Myers (born 1985), American former NFL player
- Brandon Nakashima (born 2001), American ATP- and ITF player
- Brandon Nansen (born 1993), New Zealand rugby union player
- Brandon Naurato (born 1985), American former ice hockey player and current head coach
- Brandon Nazione (born 1994), American-Italian professional basketball player
- Brandon Neel (born 1992), American NBL Canada- and TBL player
- Brandon Newey (born 1992), American racing driver
- Brandon Nima (born 1995), Papua New Guinea international rugby league footballer
- Brandon Nimmo (born 1993), American MLB player
- Brandon Noble (born 1974), American former NFL player
- Brandon Noel, American basketball player
- Brandon Nolan (born 1983), Canadian former NHL player
- Brandon Novak (born 1978), American motivational speaker, author, and former professional skateboarder- and stunt performer
- Brandon Obregón (born 1996), Argentine professional footballer
- Brandon O'Neill (born 1994), Australian soccer player
- Brandon O'Neill (gymnast) (born 1984), Canadian artistic gymnast
- Brandon Onkony (born 1997), Swiss professional footballer
- Brandon Ormonde-Ottewill (born 1995), English professional footballer
- Brandon Paenga-Amosa (born 1995), New Zealand-born Australian rugby union player
- Brandon Paiber (born 1995), Argentine professional footballer
- Brandon Palacios (born 1998), Mexican professional footballer
- Brandon Parker (born 1995), American NFL player
- Brandon Paul (born 1991), American NBA-, CBA-, NBL-, and BBL player
- Brandon Paulson (born 1973), American former Olympic Greco-Roman wrestler, and current wrestling coach
- Brandon Peel (born 1994), American LPB player
- Brandon Penn (born 1990), American professional basketball player
- Brandon Perea (born 1995), American actor
- Brandon Pereira (born 1996), Canadian field hockey player
- Brandon Pérez (born 2000), Venezuelan tennis player
- Brandon Peters (born 1997), American former NFL player
- Brandon Peterson (soccer) (born 1994), South African PSL player
- Brandon Pettigrew (born 1985), American former NFL player
- Brandon Pfaadt (born 1998), American MLB pitcher
- Brandon Phillips (born 1981), American former MLB player
- Brandon Pickersgill (born 1997), English professional rugby league footballer
- Brandon Pierrick (born 2001), English professional footballer
- Brandon Pieters (born 1976), South African professional golfer
- Brandon Pili (born 1999), American NFL player
- Brandon Pirri (born 1991), Canadian NHL- and AHL player
- Brandon Plaza (born 1996), Mexican taekwondo athlete
- Brandon Polk (born 1984), American professional basketball player
- Brandon Pollard (born 1973), American retired MLS- and PDL player
- Brandon Poltronieri (born 1986), American-born Costa Rican footballer
- Brandon Pottinger (born 2004), Jamaican track and field athlete
- Brandon Poulson (born 1990), American MiLB pitcher
- Brandon Powell (born 1995), American NFL player
- Brandon Prideaux (born 1976), American former MLS player and current college soccer coach
- Brandon Pritzl (born 1992), American college basketball coach and former player
- Brandon Prust (born 1984), Canadian former NHL player
- Brandon Puffer (born 1975), American former MLB pitcher
- Brandon Pursall (born 2004), English footballer
- Brandon Rachal (born 1999), American NBA player
- Brandon Ramírez (born 2008), Salvadoran footballer
- Brandon Reid (born 1981), Canadian former NHL player and head coach
- Brandon Reid (BMX rider) (born 1994), Canadian BMX rider
- Brandon Rembert (born 1998), American former college baseball player
- Brandon Renkart (born 1984), American former NFL player
- Brandon Revenberg (born 1992), Canadian CFL player
- Brandon Rideau (born 1982), American former NFL- and CFL player
- Brandon Riha (born 1990), American professional poker player
- Brandon Ríos (born 1986), American professional boxer
- Brandon Rivera (born 1996), Colombian professional racing cyclist
- Brandon Roberts (born 1981), American former football player
- Brandon Rock (born 1972), American former middle-distance runner
- Brandon Rose, American football player
- Brandon Roulhac (born 1983), American triple jumper
- Brandon Roy (born 1984), American NBA coach and former player
- Brandon Royval (born 1992), American professional mixed martial artist
- Brandon Rozzell (born 1989), American BNXT player
- Brandon Ruiz (born 1999), American XFL player
- Brandon Rush (born 1985), American former NBA player
- Brandon Rusnak (born 1995), American XFL player
- Brandon Rutley (born 1989), Canadian former CFL player
- Brandon Ryan (born 1997), Australian AFL player
- Brandon Saad (born 1992), American NHL player
- Brandon Saine (born 1988), American former NFL player
- Brandon Saldaña (born 1991), American-born Puerto Rican FPF player
- Brandon Sampson (born 1997), American professional basketball player
- Brandon Sanders (born 1973), American former NFL player
- Brandon Sargeant (born 1997), English former professional snooker player
- Brandon Sartiaguín (born 2000), Mexican professional footballer
- Brandon Scherff (born 1991), American NFL player
- Brandon Scheunemann (born 2005), Indonesian professional footballer
- Brandon Schneider (born 1971), American basketball coach
- Brandon Schuster (born 1998), Samoan swimmer
- Brandon Scott Mason (born 1986), American journalist and former football player
- Brandon Scullard (born 1991), South African cricketer
- Brandon Sebastian (born 1999), American XFL player and former NFL player
- Brandon Sebirumbi (born 1990), Ugandan American professional basketball player
- Brandon Segal (born 1983), Canadian former NHL-, AHL-, and DEL player
- Brandon Semenuk (born 1991), Canadian freeride mountain biker and rally racer
- Brandon Sermons (born 1991), American former NFL player
- Brandon Servania (born 1999), American MLS player
- Brandon Sesay (born 1986), American NAL player
- Brandon Shack-Harris (born 1981), American professional poker player
- Brandon Shell (born 1992), American former NFL player
- Brandon Short (born 1977), American former NFL player
- Brandon Silent (born 1973), South African former footballer
- Brandon Siler (born 1985), American former NFL player
- Brandon Silvers (born 1994), American XFL player
- Brandon Simpson (born 1981), Jamaican sprinter
- Brandon Slater (born 1999), American NBA player
- Brandon Slay (born 1975), American former freestyle wrestler
- Brandon Snyder (born 1986), American MLB coach and former player
- Brandon Soo Hoo (born 1995), American actor and martial artist
- Brandon Soppy (born 2002), French professional footballer
- Brandon Spikes (born 1987), American former NFL player
- Brandon Spoon (born 1978), American former NFL player
- Brandon Sproat (born 2000), American MLB pitcher
- Brandon Staley (born 1982), American NFL coach
- Brandon Starc (born 1993), Australian professional high jumper
- Brandon Starcevich (born 1999), Australian AFL player
- Brandon Stewart (born 1986), Canadian CFL player
- Brandon Stokley (born 1976), American former NFL player
- Brandon Stone (born 1993), South African professional golfer
- Brandon Streeter (born 1977), American football coach and former player
- Brandon Sugden (born 1978), Canadian former NHL player
- Brandon Sumrall (born 1986), American former NFL player
- Brandon Sutter (born 1989), American-born Canadian former NHL player
- Brandon Svendsen (born 1985), American AHL player
- Brandon Swartzendruber (born 1985), American USL player
- Brandon Tabb (born 1995), American LKL player
- Brandon Tanev (born 1991), Canadian NHL player
- Brandon Tate (born 1987), American former NFL player
- Brandon Tellez (born 2005), Mexican-American USL player
- Brandon Tennant (born 1991), Canadian CFL player
- Brandon Tett (born 1987), American AFL- and CFL player
- Brandon Thatch (born 1985), American professional mixed martial artist
- Brandon Thompkins (born 1987), American former CFL- and AFL player
- Brandon Thomson (born 1995), South African rugby union player
- Brandon Todd (basketball) (born 1985), American fitness expert, exercise instructor, rehabilitation specialist, and basketball player
- Brandon Tolbert (born 1975), American former NFL player
- Brandon Torrey (born 1983), American former NFL player and current coach
- Brandon Triche (born 1991), American professional basketball player
- Brandon Tumeth (born 2003), Australian NRL player
- Brandon Turner (born 1981/1982), American professional skateboarder
- Brandon Ubel (born 1991), American BBD player
- Brandon Underwood (born 1986), American former NFL player
- Brandon Valentine-Parris (born 1995), Vincentian sprinter
- Brandon Valenzuela (born 2000), Mexican baseball player
- Brandon Valjalo (born 1998), South African professional skateboarder
- Brandon Vanlalremdika (born 1994), Indian ISL player
- Brandon Varney (born 1997), American professional stock car racing driver
- Brandon Vázquez (born 1998), American MLS player
- Brandon Vera (born 1977), Filipino-American retired mixed martial artist
- Brandon Vieira (born 1992), French kickboxer and Muay Thai fighter
- Brandon Villafuerte (born 1975), American former MLB pitcher
- Brandon Vincent (born 1994), American former MLS player
- Brandon Viret (born 1988), South African cricketer
- Brandon Visher (born 1984), Hawaiian retired mixed martial artist
- Brandon Waddell (born 1994), American MLB pitcher
- Brandon Wagner (racing driver) (born 1987), American racing driver
- Brandon Wagner (baseball) (born 1995), American MLB player
- Brandon Wagner (basketball) (born 1983), Canadian wheelchair basketball player
- Brandon Wakeham (born 1999), Australian NRL player
- Brandon Wakeling (born 1994), Australian weightlifter
- Brandon Walker (born 2002), Australian AFL player
- Brandon Walkin (born 1994), Australian tennis player
- Brandon Wallace (born 1985), American NBA player
- Brandon Walter (born 1996), American MLB pitcher
- Brandon Walton (born 1998), American NFL player
- Brandon Ward (soccer) (born 1972), American retired MLS player
- Brandon Washington (born 1988), American former CFL- and NFL player and current coach
- Brandon Watson (born 1981), American former MLB player
- Brandon Watts (born 1991), American former NFL- and AAF player
- Brandon Webb (born 1979), American former MLB pitcher
- Brandon Weeden (born 1983), American former NFL player
- Brandon Wegher (born 1990), American former NFL player
- Brandon West (born 1987), Canadian CFL player
- Brandon Westgate (born 1989), American professional skateboarder
- Brandon Whitaker (born 1985), Canadian CFL player
- Brandon White (born 1997), Australian former AFL player
- Brandon Whiting (born 1976), American former NFL player
- Brandon Whitt (born 1982), American former stock car racing driver
- Brandon Wilds (born 1993), American NFL and CFL player
- Brandon Williamson (born 1998), American MLB pitcher
- Brandon Williamson (born 1998), American soccer player
- Brandon Wimbush (born 1996), American former college football player
- Brandon Winey (born 1978), American former NFL player
- Brandon Wolff (born 1975), American mixed martial artist and former Navy SEAL
- Brandon Woodruff (born 1993), American MLB pitcher
- Brandon Workman (born 1988), American former MLB pitcher
- Brandon Wright (born 1997), American USFL player
- Brandon Wu (born 1997), American PGA Tour player
- Brandon Wynn (born 1988), American artistic gymnast
- Brandon Yip (born 1985), Chinese-Canadian KHL player
- Brandon Young (basketball) (born 1991), American basketball player
- Brandon Young (baseball) (born 1998), American baseball pitcher
- Brandon Zerk-Thatcher (born 1998), Australian AFL player
- Brandon Zibaka (born 1995), English footballer
- Brandon Zylstra (born 1993), American NFL- and CFL player

=== Disambiguation ===
- Brandon Adams, several people
- Brandon Allen, several people
- Brandon Bailey, several people
- Brandon Barnes, several people
- Brandon Bell, several people
- Brandon Brooks, several people
- Brandon Brown, several people
- Brandon Bryant, several people
- Brandon Childress, several people
- Brandon Clark, several people
- Brandon Copeland, several people
- Brandon Dixon, several people
- Brandon Fleming, several people
- Brandon Goodwin, several people
- Brandon Hall, several people
- Brandon Hughes, several people
- Brandon Jackson, several people
- Brandon Jenkins, several people
- Brandon Johnson, several people
- Brandon Jones, several people
- Brandon Jordan, several people
- Brandon King, several people
- Brandon Knight, several people
- Brandon Lee, several people
- Brandon McClelland, several people
- Brandon McDonald, several people
- Brandon Miller, several people
- Brandon Mitchell, several people
- Brandon Moore, several people
- Brandon Reilly, several people
- Brandon Robinson, several people
- Brandon Rogers, several people
- Brandon Smith, several people
- Brandon Stephens, several people
- Brandon Taylor, several people
- Brandon Thomas, several people
- Brandon Thompson, several people
- Brandon Wardell, several people
- Brandon Williams, several people
- Brandon Wilson, several people
- Brandon Wong, several people
- Brandon Wood, several people

=== Other ===
- Brandon Crisp (1993-c. 2008), Canadian boy found dead
- Brandon James (born 1997), one of the American McCaughey septuplets
- Brandon Lawson (1986-?), American missing man
- Brandon McMillan (born 1977), American television personality, animal trainer, author, and television producer
- Brandon Swanson (born 1989), American missing man
- Brandon Tatum (born 1987), American political commentator, author, radio personality, former police officer, and former college football player
- Brandon Tsay (born 1996/1997), American hobbyist computer programmer who disarmed the 2023 Monterey Park shooting gunman
- Brandon Vedas (1981-2003), American computer enthusiast and recreational drug user

== Fictional characters ==
- Brandon “Badger” Mayhew from AMC’s Breaking Bad, portrayed by Matt Jones
- Brandon Stark, in the A Song of Ice and Fire series of epic fantasy novels
- Brandon Walsh, in the US teen drama TV series Beverly Hills, 90210, played by Jason Priestley

== See also ==
- Brandan, given name and surname
- Branden (given name)
- Brandin, name
