= Barkhuizen =

Barkhuizen is a surname. Notable people with the surname include:

- Brandon Barkhuizen (born 1990), South African footballer
- Johan Barkhuizen (born 1982), South African cricketer
- Tom Barkhuizen (born 1993), English footballer

== See also ==
- Barkhuizen v Napier, South African legal case
