= Brandon Anderson (disambiguation) =

Brandon Anderson (born 1986) is an American singer, rapper and record producer better known as Anderson .Paak.

Brandon Anderson may also refer to:

- Brandon Anderson (American football) (born 1985), American football player
- Brandon Anderson (businessman), American sociologist and businessman

== See also ==
- Brandon Sanderson (born 1975), American novelist
