= Miret =

Miret is a surname. Notable people with the surname include:

- María Miret (born 1995), Spanish footballer
- Roger Miret (born 1964), Cuban-born American singer

== See also ==
- Mirette (opera), an opéra comique composed by André Messager
- Viret
