= Lil B (disambiguation) =

Lil B is an American hip hop artist.

Lil B may also refer to:

- Lil'B (group), a Japanese female pop duo active 2007–present
- Lil B (skateboarder), nickname of American professional skateboarder Brandon Turner (born 1981 or 1982)
