= Branden (given name) =

Branden is a given name. Notable people with the name include:

- Branden Albert (born 1984), former American football offensive tackle
- Branden Becker (born 1996), American professional baseball player
- Branden Bowen (born 1996), American football player
- Branden Campbell of Neon Trees, American rock band from Provo, Utah
- Branden Carlson (born 1999), American basketball player
- Branden Dawson (born 1993), American professional basketball player
- Branden Durst (born 1980), Democratic politician from Tacoma, Washington
- Branden Grace (born 1988), professional golfer from South Africa
- Branden Lee Hinkle (born 1973), American mixed martial artist
- Branden Jacobs-Jenkins (born 1984), American playwright
- Branden James (born 1978), American tenor
- Branden W. Joseph, the Frank Gallipoli Professor of Modern and Contemporary Art in Columbia University
- Branden Kline (born 1991), American professional baseball pitcher
- Branden Ledbetter (born 1986), former American football tight end
- Branden Oliver (born 1991), American football running back
- Branden Ore (born 1986), former college football running back
- Branden Petersen (born 1986), Minnesota politician and former member of the Minnesota Senate
- Branden Pinder (born 1989), American professional baseball pitcher
- Branden Saller of Atreyu, American metalcore band
- Branden Shanahan (born 1969), Canadian professional ice hockey executive and former player
- Branden Steineckert (born 1978), the drummer for the punk rock band Rancid
- Branden Turepu (born 1990), footballer from the Cook Islands
- Branden Walton (born 1998), American para-cyclist
- Branden Whitehurst (born 1989), Virgin Islander swimmer

== See also ==
- Branden (surname)
- Brandan, given name and surname
- Brandon (given name)
- Brandin, name
- Brendan (given name)
