= Viret =

Viret is a surname. Notable people with the surname include:

- Brandon Viret (born 1988), South African cricketer
- Frédéric Viret (1822–1898), French organist
- Jacques Viret (born 1943), French musicologist of Swiss origin
- Pierre Viret (1511–1571), Swiss theologian

== See also ==
- Virat
