= Brandon Johnson (disambiguation) =

Brandon Johnson (born 1976) is an American politician and the mayor of Chicago.

Brandon Johnson may also refer to:

- R. Brandon Johnson (born 1974), American actor and TV host
- B. J. Johnson (American football) (Brandon Willis Johnson, born 1982), American football wide receiver
- Brandon Johnson (linebacker) (born 1983), American football linebacker
- Brandon Johnson (runner) (born 1985), American middle-distance track athlete, sprinter, and hurdler
- Brandon Dewayne Johnson (born 1988), American serial killer and robber
- Brandon Johnson (wide receiver) (born 1998), American football wide receiver
- Brandon Johnson (defensive back) (born 2003), American football defensive back

== See also ==
- Brendan Johnson (born 1975), 40th United States Attorney for the District of South Dakota
- Brendan Johnston (born 1991), Australian professional racing cyclist
- Brennan Johnson (born 2001), Welsh footballer
