= Brandon Riha =

American poker player (born 1990)

- Nickname: Briha5254
- Born: April 26, 1990 (age 36)

World Series of Poker
- Bracelet: None
- Money finishes: 2

World Poker Tour
- Title: None
- Final table: None

Brandon Riha (born April 26, 1990) is an American professional poker player from Chickamauga, Georgia currently residing in Las Vegas, Nevada. He was Carder England's roommate.

== Online poker ==
Playing under the screen names of "Briha5254" on PokerStars and Full Tilt Poker, Riha's multi table tournament online winnings exceeded $465,000, including a win in the Full Tilt PokerSunday Mulligan for $49,320, a win in the Full Tilt Poker $100 rebuy tournament. Brandon has won the BoDog Sunday Major and final tabled the Cake Poker monthly $250 tournament.

== Live poker ==
=== The World Series of Poker ===
Brandon turned 21 shortly after "Black Friday" and moved to Las Vegas to begin his career as a live pro. Brandon had two cashes at the 42nd Annual World series of Poker.

=== Venetian DeepStacks Extravaganza ===
Brandon took 2nd place in the 6/21 DeepStacks event for $44,265.

Brandon won the Venetian DeepStacks Extravaganza IV $500 buy in tournament for $33,347

=== Turning Stone Casino ===
Riha made his first live appearance at Turning Stone Casino in March 2009 at the March Madness event making a final table and taking 8th place in the $200 turbo for $1,006. Brandon continued his success taking 4th in the East Coast Poker Championship main event for $25,476 and a win in the 2009 Fall Poker Classic for $32,200.

=== Festa al Lago Classic ===
Brandon won and took 2nd in back to back Festa $500 tournaments in 2011 for a combined total of $13,385
