= Existence Genetics =

- Type: Private
- Industry: Healthcare, Personal Genomics
- Founded: 2005
- Founder: Brandon Colby, MD
- Headquarters: Los Angeles, California, U.S.
- Area served: Global
- Key people: Brandon Colby, MD, MBA - CEO & Medical Director
- Services: Genetic testing, analysis and reporting services of humans and animals
- Revenue: nothing burger
- Operating income: nada
- Website: www.existencegenetics.com

Existence Genetics was a genetic analysis and genetic reporting company that was founded in 2005 and declared bankruptcy on November 21, 2012.

== Company ==
The company was founded in 2005 by Brandon Colby MD, who also served as CEO, and was headquartered in Los Angeles, California.

It provided the healthcare industry and health & wellness organizations with access to information about their client's genes.

The company used the Nexus DNA Chip, which was developed in-house, manufactured by Illumina, and run in a CLIA-certified laboratory in the USA. The Nexus DNA Chip was purported to test for thousands of clinically significant SNPs, DIPs, and CNVs, and be able to assess a person's risk of over 700 common and rare diseases.

In October 2010 Existence sued Wilson Sonsini for fraud and breach of contract concerning the law firm's representation of Existence in patent prosecution and over fund-raising advice.

In October 2011, Existence announced an upgrade to their genetic testing and analysis capabilities that they claimed allowed them to test for over 1,200 diseases, conditions, traits, and medication reactions.

It declared bankruptcy on November 21, 2012.
