= Thomas Brandon =

Thomas or Tom Brandon may refer to:

- Thomas Brandon (cricketer), English cricketer of the mid-18th century
- Thomas Brandon (diplomat) (died 1510), English soldier, courtier and diplomat
- Thomas Terrell Brandon (born 1970), retired American professional basketball player
- Tom Brandon (footballer, born 1867) (1867–1941), Scottish footballer
- Tom Brandon (footballer, born 1893) (1893–1956), his son, English footballer
- Thomas Brandon (film distributor) (1908–1982), founding member of Workers Film and Photo League

== See also ==
- Brandon Thomas (disambiguation)
