= Brandon Moore =

Brandon Moore may refer to:

- Brandon Moore (linebacker) (born 1979), American football linebacker
- Brandon Moore (guard) (born 1980), American football guard
- Brandon Moore (offensive tackle) (born 1970), American football offensive tackle
- Brandon Moore (rugby league) (born 1996), English rugby league footballer
- Brandon Moore (composer) (born 1976), American composer
- Brandon Moore (criminal), American convicted for being a part of a 2001 gang rape
