= Viraat =

Viraat may refer to:

== People ==
- Viraat (actor, born 1989), Indian actor, VFX artist, dancer and singer
- Viraat (actor, born 1995), Indian actor in Kannada cinema
- Viraat Badhwar (born 1995), Indian-Australian golfer

== Military ==
- INS Viraat, a former Indian aircraft carrier
- Operation Viraat, a 1988 anti-insurgency operation in Sri Lanka

== Other uses ==
- Viraat Ramayan Mandir, a Hindu temple complex in Kesaria, India
- Viraat (film), a 2016 Indian Kannada-language action drama film

== See also ==
- Virat (disambiguation)
- Virata (disambiguation)
