= Brandán =

Brandán is a surname. Notable people with the name include:

- Braian Brandán (born 1998), Argentine footballer
- Fernando Brandán (footballer, born 1980), Argentine footballer
- Fernando Brandán (footballer, born 1990), Argentine footballer
- Pablo Brandán (born 1983), Argentine footballer and manager

== See also ==
- Brandan, given name and surname
