= Brandan =

Brandan is a given name and surname. Notable people with the name include:

== Given name ==
- Brandan Craig (born 2004), American soccer player
- Brandan Greczkowski (born 1997), American judoka
- Brandan Ritchey (born 1994), American Entrepreneur
- Brandan Kearney (born 1993), American basketball player
- Brandan Parfitt (born 1998), Australian rules footballer
- Brandan Robertson (born 1992), American writer and minister
- Brandan Schieppati (born 1980), American singer
- Brandan Wilkinson (born 1997), Scottish rugby league footballer
- Brandan Wright (born 1987), American basketball player

== Surname ==
- Cory Brandan (born 1976), American singer

== See also ==
- Brandán, surname
- Branden (given name)
- Branden (surname)
- Brandin, given name and surname
- Brandon (given name)
- Brandon (surname)
