= Branden (surname) =

Branden is a surname. Notable people with the surname include:

- Barbara Branden (1929–2013), Canadian writer, editor and lecturer
- Mikael Branden (born 1959), former Swedish backstroke swimmer
- Nathaniel Branden (1930–2014), Canadian–American psychotherapist and writer

== See also ==
- Branden (given name)
- Brandan, given name and surname
- Brandon (surname)
- Brandin, name
- Braden (surname)
