= Brandon Wood (disambiguation) =

Brandon Wood (born 1985) is an American former baseball player.

Brandon Wood or Woods may also refer to:

- Brandon Wood (basketball) (born 1989), American basketball player
- Brandon Woods, Australian musician
- Brandon Wood, woodland south of Binley Woods, Warwickshire, England
