= Brandon (surname) =

Brandon is a surname of British, Irish and French origin. Notable persons with that surname include:

- Alexander Brandon (born 1974), American musician and composer
- Alfred de Bathe Brandon (all of Wellington, New Zealand):
  - Alfred Brandon (politician) (1809–86), politician
  - Alfred Brandon (mayor) (1854–1938), Mayor of Wellington, New Zealand (son of the above)
  - Alfred Brandon (lawyer) (1883–1974), of Wellington, New Zealand (son of the above)
- Arthur Brandon (1822–1847), British architect and architectural writer, brother of Raphael B.
- Brent D. Brandon (born 1960), U.S. Air Force aviator, Distinguished Flying Cross
- Catherine Willoughby, 12th Baroness Willoughby de Eresby (Catherine Brandon) (1519–1580), duchess of Suffolk
- Charles Brandon, 1st Duke of Suffolk, close friend and brother-in-law of Henry VIII
- Charles Brandon, 3rd Duke of Suffolk (c. 1484 – 1545)
- Chris Brandon (born 1976), professional English football player
- Dave Brandon (born 1952), American businessman
- David Brandon (actor) (born 1940), American actor
- David Brandon (architect) (1813–1897), Scottish architect
- Edgar Ewing Brandon (1865–1957), professor of French and former president of Miami University
- Eleanor Clifford, Countess of Cumberland (Lady Eleanor Brandon) (1519–1547)
- Ellis Brandon (1923–2024), Dutch veteran (Engelandvaarders)
- Elmer Brandon (1906–1956), Canadian politician
- Eric Brandon (1920–1982), English Formula One driver
- Faizon Brandon (born 2008), American football player
- Frances Grey, Duchess of Suffolk (1517–1559), maiden name Lady Frances Brandon, niece of Henry VIII
- Gennifer Brandon (born 1990), American basketball player
- Gerard Brandon (1788–1850), American politician and Governor of Mississippi
- Harry "Skip" Brandon (b. 1941), founding partner of Smith Brandon International
- Heather Brandon, South African chairman of the World Board of the World Association of Girl Guides and Girl Scouts
- Henry Brandon, 2nd Duke of Suffolk (1535–1551), son of Charles Brandon, 1st Duke of Suffolk and Catherine Willoughby
- Henry Brandon, 1st Earl of Lincoln (1516–1534), nephew of Henry VIII
- Henry Brandon (actor) (1912–1990), American character actor
- Henry L. Brandon (1923–1997), American naval aviator and businessman
- Henry Brandon, Baron Brandon of Oakbrook (1920–1999), Baron of Oakbrook
- Jacques Émile Édouard Brandon (1831–1897), French artist
- Johnny Brandon (1925–2017), English singer
- Kirk Brandon (born 1956), British musician and singer/songwriter
- Mark E. Brandon, American lawyer and academic
- Martin Brandon-Bravo (1932–2018), British politician
- Michael Brandon (born 1945), American actor
- Michael Brandon (pornographic actor) (born 1965), American pornographic actor
- Olga Brandon (1863–1906), Australian-born actress in the United States and England
- Raphael Brandon (1817–1877), British architect and architectural writer, brother of Arthur B.
- Richard Brandon (?? – 1649), English hangman
- S. G. F. Brandon (1907–1971), University of Manchester professor of comparative religion
- Sam Brandon (born 1979), American football player
- Skeeter Brandon (1948–2008), American blues keyboardist, singer and songwriter
- Terrell Brandon (born 1970), American former basketball player
- Thomas Brandon (cricketer), 18th century English cricketer
- Thomas Brandon (diplomat) (died 1510), English diplomat
- Tony Brandon (born 1933), British radio presenter and comedian
- Warren Eugene Brandon (1916–1977), American painter
- William Brandon (author) (1914–2002), American writer and historian
- William Brandon (standard-bearer) (1456–1485), standard-bearer at the Battle of Bosworth
- William W. Brandon (1868–1934), former governor of Alabama

== See also ==
- Brandan, given name and surname
- Branden (surname)
- Brandin, surname and given name
