= Brandin =

Brandin is both a given name and a surname. Notable people with the name include:

- Brandin Bryant (born 1993), American football player
- Brandin Cooks (born 1993), American football player
- Brandin Cote (born 1981), Canadian ice hockey player
- Brandin Echols (born 1997), American football player
- Brandin Knight (born 1981), American basketball player
- Brandin Podziemski (born 2003), Polish-American basketball player
- Claes-Göran Brandin (born 1948), Swedish politician
- Maria Brandin (born 1963), Swedish rower

== See also ==
- Brandan, given name and surname
- Branden (given name)
- Branden (surname)
- Brandon (given name)
- Brandon (surname)
