= Virata (disambiguation) =

Virata is a king in the Hindu epic Mahabharata

Virata may also refer to:

- Virata kingdom, ancient Indian kingdom
- Virata Parva, book of the Mahabharata
- Virata Corporation, British engineering company
- Cesar Virata (1930–2026), Filipino politician and Prime Minister of the Philippines
- Leonides S. Virata Memorial School, Catholic private school in the Philippines

== See also ==
- INS Viraat, Indian aircraft carrier
- Viraat (disambiguation)
- Virat (disambiguation)
