= Brandon Dixon =

Brandon Dixon may refer to:

- Brandon Dixon (American football) (born 1990), American football cornerback
- Brandon Dixon (baseball) (born 1992), American baseball infielder and outfielder
- Brandon Victor Dixon (born 1981), American actor, singer and theatrical producer
- J. Brandon Dixon, professor of mechanical and biomedical engineering
