= Brandon Mitchell =

Brandon Mitchell may refer to:

- Brandon Mitchell (defensive end) (born 1975), former NFL defensive end
- Brandon Mitchell (safety) (born 1983), former NFL safety
- Brandon Mitchell (politician), American businessman and member of the Idaho House of Representative
