= Brandon Moss (police officer) =

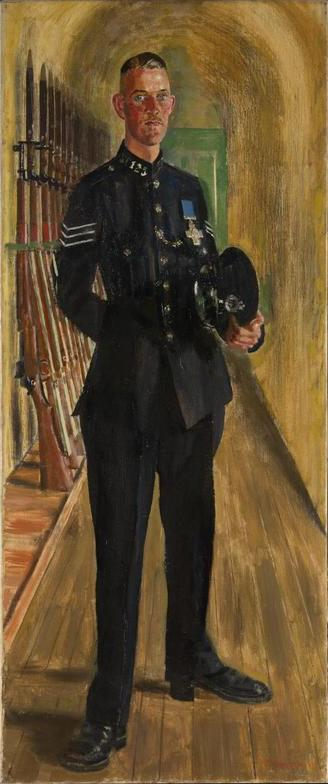
- Brandon Moss by Alfred Thomson
- Born: Brandon Moss; 5 June 1909; Brandon, Suffolk, England
- Died: 9 August 1999 (aged 90); Coventry
- Known for: George Cross recipient in World War II

Special Constable Brandon Moss GC (5 June 1909 – 9 August 1999) was a British police officer who was awarded the George Cross for his "superhuman efforts and utter disregard for personal injury" while with the Coventry Constabulary during World War II.

== Life ==
Moss was born in 1909 and he was one of six children.

Moss married Vera Watson and had two daughters. He died, aged 90, in Coventry on 9 August 1999.

== 14 November 1940 ==
On the night of 14/15 November 1940, following a heavy Luftwaffe air raid consisting of 437 aircraft dropping 394 tons of high explosives and 127 parachute mines (part of the Coventry Blitz), Moss led two rescue attempts on houses which had been destroyed by a high explosive bomb. Managing to free three people trapped in the rubble in the first house and another person in the second after seven hours of digging through the night. He also recovered four bodies.

A fractured gas main, further air raids and a delayed action bomb no more than twenty yards from the scene added to the danger of falling masonry and structural collapse.

== George Cross citation ==
The citation for his award was published in the London Gazette on 13 December 1940, when he was presented with the George Cross by King George VI at Buckingham Palace.

The King has been graciously pleased to approve the award of the George Cross to –

Brandon Moss, Special Constable, Coventry Special Constabulary. Special Constable Moss was engaged on duty when a house was struck by an H.E. bomb and completely demolished, burying the three occupants. He led a rescue party in clearing an entry to the trapped victims under extremely dangerous conditions owing to collapsing debris and leaking gas. When conditions became critically dangerous he alone worked his way through a space he cleared and was responsible for the saving of the three persons alive.

It was then learned that other persons were buried in the adjoining premises and Moss at once again led the rescue. The workers became exhausted after many hours of labouring unceasingly and inspiringly throughout the complete night, again falling beams and debris around him, and as a result of his superhuman efforts and utter disregard for personal injury one person was rescued alive and four other bodies recovered. During the whole of the time of the rescue, bombs were dropping around and it was known that there was a delayed action bomb in the doorway of a tavern only 20 yards away. Moss was working from 11p.m. until 6.30 a.m. without pause.

— London Gazette

His George Cross is now on display at the Lord Ashcroft VC Gallery in the Imperial War Museum, London.

== Honours ==

Ribbon	Description	Notes
	George Cross (GC)	13 December 1940
	Defence Medal	
	Queen Elizabeth II Coronation Medal	1953
	Queen Elizabeth II Silver Jubilee Medal	1977; UK Version of this Medal
	Special Constabulary Long Service Medal	
