= Brandon Ogbunu =

American evolutionary biologist

C. Brandon Ogbunu(gafor)
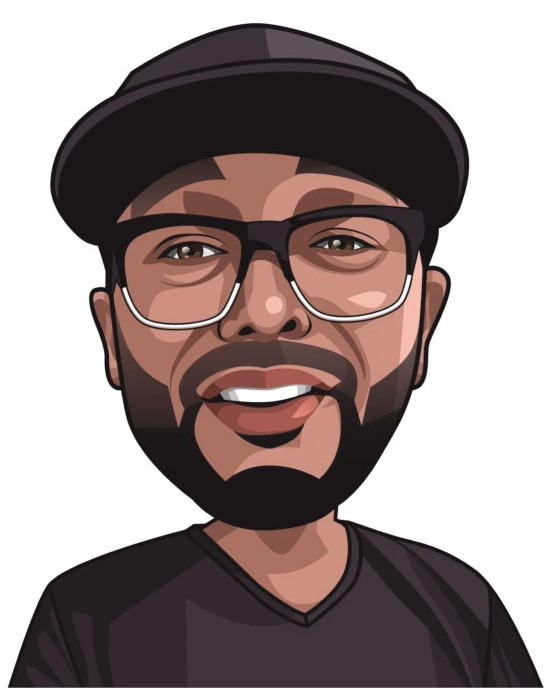
- 2020 cartoon of Ogbunu from a joint video on SARS-Cov2
- Citizenship: USA
- Education: Yale University; Howard University
- Scientific career
- Fields: evolutionary biology, computational biology, evolutionary medicine, complex systems, disease evolution and ecology, science and society
- Workplaces: Yale University; Harvard University; Brown University; University of Vermont; Santa Fe Institute; Massachusetts Institute of Technology
- Thesis: Robustness, ecological history, and disease emergence : a study in RNA viruses (2009)
- Doctoral advisor: Paul E. Turner
- Other academic advisors: Daniel L. Hartl Susan Gottesman Vernon R. Morris

C. Brandon Ogbunu(gafor) is an American computational biologist who is an Associate Professor (with tenure) of Ecology and Evolutionary Biology at Yale University, and a professor at the Santa Fe Institute. He uses experimental and computational tools to understand the causes of disease, ranging from molecular underpinnings to the social determinants of public health. In addition, he runs a parallel research program at the intersection between science and culture, where he explores the social forces that craft science, and how sciences influences society.

== Early life and education ==
Ogbunu was born in New York City. He credits his mother, a school teacher, with helping him to become a successful academic. He studied chemistry at Howard University, graduating summa cum laude in 2002. He has said that it was during his undergraduate studies that he discovered the field of evolutionary biology, whilst reading the work of Stephen Jay Gould and Jane Goodall. After graduating, he was awarded a United States Fulbright Fellowship, and moved to Kenya to study malaria at the International Center of Insect Physiology and Ecology. He then attended Yale University to study medicine and microbiology where his early interests were in pediatric infectious illness and child development, before joining the laboratory of Paul Turner because of Brandon's growing interest in evolution, epidemics, and game theory. Also while a student at Yale, Brandon was involved with advocacy around global health, and he worked with UNICEF in Laos and Angola to develop policy for early childhood development. While at Yale, he was awarded a fellowship from the Yale Institute for Biospheric Studies and a UNCF dissertation fellowship.

== Research and career ==
After completing his doctoral studies, he moved to Harvard University and the Broad Institute, and was awarded Ford Foundation postdoctoral fellowship to study under Daniel Hartl, where he worked on systems biology and protein evolution. In 2015, he accepted a position at University of Vermont, where he was awarded a George Washington Henderson Fellowship, and eventually joining the faculty in the department of biology.

In 2018, Ogbunu was appointed an assistant professor in the department of ecology and evolutionary biology, Brown University, where he was a member of the Center for Computational Molecular Biology. In 2020, he joined the faculty at Yale University. In 2022, he was elected to the external faculty at the Santa Fe Institute. Also in 2022, he was awarded Martin Luther King Jr. Visiting Professor at Massachusetts Institute of Technology, where he is hosted by Matthew Shoulders in the Department of Chemistry, and investigated the evolution of proteins and disease. In 2025, he was appointed to the Resident Faculty of the Santa Fe Institute, where he serves as a professor.

== Science and society ==
Ogbunu operates a parallel research program as a writer and commentator at the intersection of science and society. He is an Ideas contributor for Wired and has written for various other publications, such as The Atlantic, Andscape, Undark Magazine, Scientific American, and the Boston Review. His topics have ranged from Afrofuturism, the COVID-19 pandemic, to bioethics, to sports and epidemiology.

His currently a board member of the Genetics Society of America, the Metcalf Institute, and the Catalyst Collaborative at MIT, and a past member of the board of The Story Collider and delivered a Story Collider presentation at the Evolution Meetings in 2019, entitled "The Liberation of RNA". In 2018, he appeared on the Emmy Award-winning documentary web series Finding Your Roots: The Seedlings. His research contributed to Kimberly Reed's 2022 documentary on gender. He was also a contributor to a 2022 Undark Magazine special series on legacy of race science.

== Selected publications ==
- Robert C McBride; C Brandon Ogbunugafor; Paul E Turner (11 August 2008). "Robustness promotes evolvability of thermotolerance in an RNA virus". BMC Evolutionary Biology. 8: 231. doi:10.1186/1471-2148-8-231. ISSN 1471-2148. PMC 2518931. PMID 18694497. Wikidata Q36843864.
- C Brandon Ogbunugafor; C Scott Wylie; Ibrahim Diakite; Daniel M Weinreich; Daniel L Hartl (January 2016). "Adaptive Landscape by Environment Interactions Dictate Evolutionary Dynamics in Models of Drug Resistance". PLOS Computational Biology. 12 (1) e1004710. doi:10.1371/journal.pcbi.1004710. ISSN 1553-734X. PMC 4726534. PMID 26808374. Wikidata Q28552806.
- Francois X Omlin; John C Carlson; C Brandon Ogbunugafor; Ahmed Hassanali (1 December 2007). "Anopheles gambiae exploits the treehole ecosystem in western Kenya: a new urban malaria risk?". American Journal of Tropical Medicine and Hygiene. 77 (6 Suppl): 264–269. doi:10.4269/ajtmh.2007.77.264. ISSN 0002-9637. PMID 18165501. Wikidata Q39827444.
