= Olga Brandon =

Australian stage actress (1863–1906)

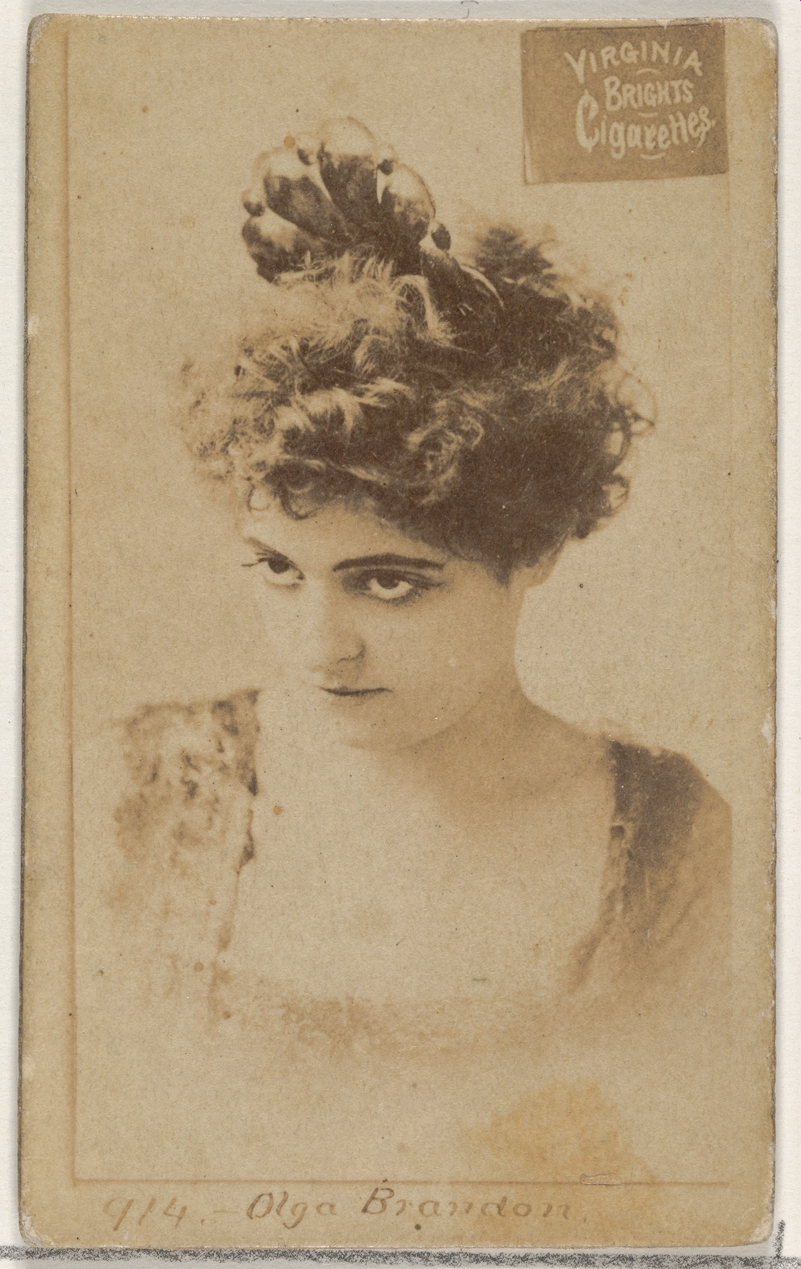
- Olga Brandon, ca. 1888
- Born: Olga Lazarrevich; 21 December 1863; Redcastle, Victoria, Australia
- Died: 8 May 1906 (aged 42); London, England
- Other name: Olga Brandenstein
- Occupation: Actor
- Years active: 1884–1901
- Spouse(s): Valentine Wolfenstein(1878 div. same year); Herman Brandenstein(1880–86)

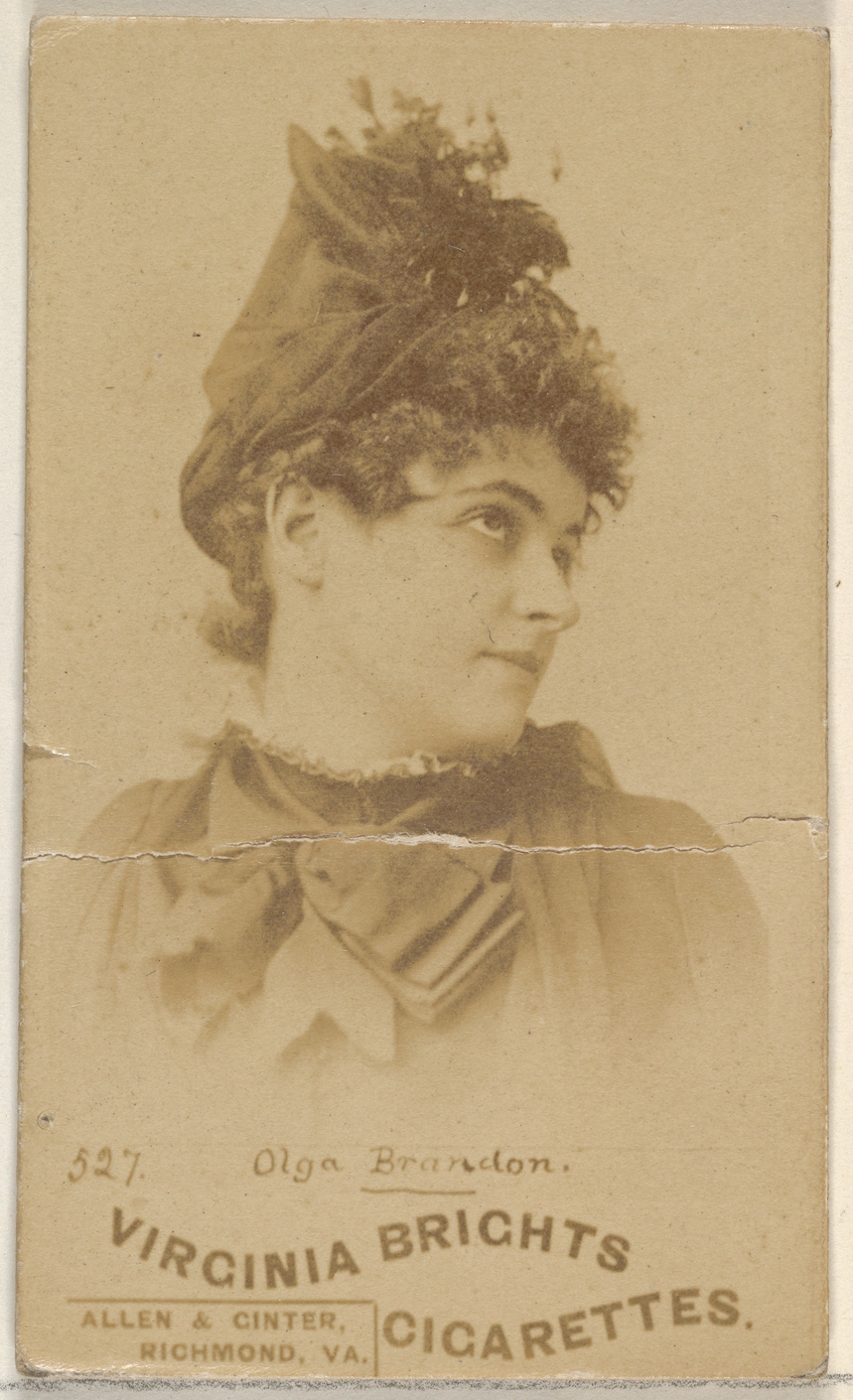

Olga Brandon (1863–1906) was an Australian-born stage actress who specialized in comedy, melodrama and drama in the United States and England.

== Biography ==
She was born Olga Lazarrevich to Spiro Lazarrevich, a Croatian, and Victoria Schinkle, from Denmark. She had three brothers and two sisters, Anna and Adrianna.

Olga and her family moved to Geelong in 1865. Her father accidentally drowned in 1867 in Corio Bay. Her mother placed Olga and her siblings in orphanages called Sacred Heart and St. Augustines. Olga's mother worked in New Zealand before returning to Australia in 1873. Victoria married an American seafarer Albert Wagner in 1875 and the entire family reunited and emigrated to Los Angeles in America.

At 14 in 1878, Olga married a 32-year-old man named Valentine Wolfenstein. The marriage didn't last and they separated 3 months later. In 1880 she married a bookkeeper, Herman Brandenstein, 25, and moved with him to New York in 1884. She altered part of her married name and professionally referred to herself as Olga Brandon.

In New York she became popular with society and attracted admirers and lovers. She and Brandenstein separated in 1886 and Olga left for England. Olga settled in England, achieving fame and fortune and finally performing at London's Shaftesbury Theatre in 1890. She was one of the highest paid actresses of the time and was received in comedy and drama. She enjoyed success throughout the 1890s but her health gradually deteriorated from tuberculosis, forcing her to retire by 1901. She survived until 1906 when the tuberculosis claimed her life in London.
