= Brandon Adams =

Brandon Adams is the name of:

- Brandon Adams (actor) (born 1979), American actor
- Brandon Adams (boxer) (born 1989), American boxer
- Brandon Adams (poker player) (born 1978), American poker player
