= Brandon Jenkins =

Brandon Jenkins may refer to:

- Brandon Jenkins (American football) (born 1990), American football player
- Brandon Jenkins (musician) (1969–2018), American country-music singer-songwriter
- Brandon Jenkins (basketball), American basketball player for Basket-club Boncourt
- Brandon "Jinx" Jenkins, American multimedia creative

== See also ==
- Brendan Jenkins (born 1959), Australian politician
