= Brandon McPherson =

English footballer

Personal information
- Full name: Brandon Samuel McPherson
- Date of birth: 2 February 2002 (age 24)
- Place of birth: Solihull, England
- Position: Winger

Youth career
- Walsall
- 2018–2019: Grimsby Town

Senior career*
Years	Team	Apps	(Gls)
2019–2020	Grimsby Town	0	(0)
- * Club domestic league appearances and goals as of 00:00, 5 September 2019 (UTC)

Brandon Samuel McPherson (born 2 February 2002) is an English professional footballer who plays as a winger.

== Career ==
In 2018, McPherson joined Grimsby Town's academy from Walsall. On 3 September 2019, McPherson made his debut for Grimsby in a 2–1 EFL Trophy defeat against Scunthorpe United.

== Career statistics ==
As of 3 September 2019

Appearances and goals by club, season and competition
Club	Season	League			FA Cup		League Cup		Other		Total	
Club	Season	Division	Apps	Goals	Apps	Goals	Apps	Goals	Apps	Goals	Apps	Goals
Grimsby Town	2019–20	League Two	0	0	0	0	0	0	1 (Note: Appearance(s) in EFL Trophy)	0	1	0
Career total			0	0	0	0	0	0	1	0	1	0
