= Brandon Brooks (disambiguation) =

Brandon Brooks (born 1989) is an American football guard.

Brandon Brooks may also refer to:

- Brandon Brooks (basketball) (born 1987), American professional basketball player
- Brandon Brooks (water polo) (born 1981), American water polo goalie
