= Brandon Neel =

American basketball player (born 1992)

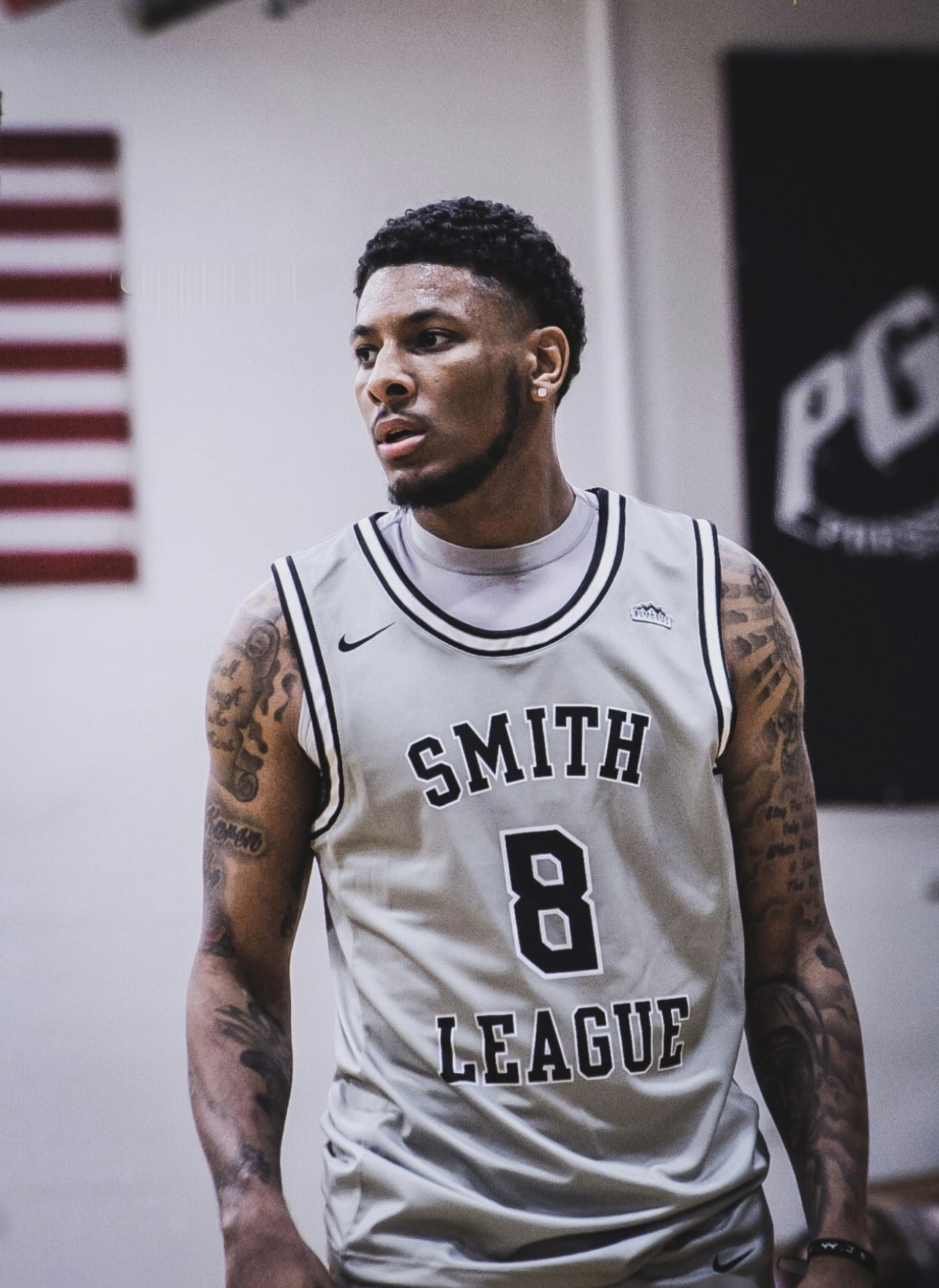
- Neel in 2022

No. 23 – Tri-City Tide
- Position: Shooting guard
- League: The Basketball League

Personal information
- Born: December 7, 1992 (age 33) Cincinnati, Ohio, U.S.
- Listed height: 6 ft 4 in (1.93 m)
- Listed weight: 205 lb (93 kg)

Career information
- High school: La Salle (Cincinnati, Ohio); Fork Union Military Academy (Fork Union, Virginia)
- College: South Plains (2012–2015); Wright State (2015); Midwestern State (2016–2018)
- NBA draft: 2018: undrafted
- Playing career: 2019–present

Career history
- 2019–2020: Moncton Magic
- 2020-2021: Neptune Basketball Club
- 2021-2022: Buras Guaymas
- 2022: Kentucky Enforcers
- 2024-2026: Tri-City Tide

Career highlights
- Second-team All-Lone Star (2018); Honorable mention All-Lone Star (2017)

Brandon Neel (born December 7, 1992) is an American professional basketball player for the Tri-City Tide of The Basketball League. He was born in Cincinnati, Ohio. He has played for South Plains College, Midwestern State Mustangs and La Salle High School (Cincinnati, Ohio).

== Early life and college career ==
Neel was born and raised in Cincinnati, Ohio. Neel attended La Salle High School (Cincinnati, Ohio) where he averaged 14.6 points per game. Neel led La Salle to a 28–2 record and the 2011 state championship. In 2011, Neel was The Enquirer Division I player of the year and was named the most outstanding player in the state tournament.

Neel started his college career with the South Plains College Texans, where he averaged 10.1 points per game to go along with 5.7 rebounds per game. Neel played for Midwestern State University from 2016 to 2018. In his final two years, Neel averaged 18.8 points per game to go along with 5.8 rebounds per game.

== Professional career ==
In 2019, Neel was signed by the Moncton Magic for the 2019-2020 for the National Basketball League of Canada (NBL Canada).

In 2020, Neel was signed by Neptune Basketball Club for the 2020–2021 season in the Super League (Ireland)

In 2021, Neel was signed by Buras Guaymas for the 2021 season in the Circuito de Baloncesto de la Costa del Pacífico. Neel averaged 22.3 points per game to go along with 5.7 rebounds per game.

In 2022, Neel was signed by the Kentucky Enforcers for the 2022 season of The Basketball League (TBL). Neel averaged 13 points per game to go along with 4 rebounds per game.

In 2024, Neel signed with the Tri-City Tide for the 2024–2025 season of The Basketball League . Neel averaged 8.8 points per game to go along with 3.7 rebounds per game.

Neel re-signed with the Tide for the 2025-2026 season.
