= J. Brandon Dixon =

American academic

- Born: United States
- Education: Texas A&M University (Ph.D., B.S.)
- Known for: Lymphatics
- Awards: NSF Career Award, Outstanding BioE Adviser
- Scientific career
- Fields: Mechanical engineering Biomedical engineering
- Workplaces: Georgia Institute of Technology
- Doctoral advisor: Gerard Cote

J. Brandon Dixon is a professor of mechanical and biomedical engineering at the Georgia Institute of Technology. He heads the Laboratory of Lymphatic Biology and Bioengineering (LLBB). Among his most recent publications, Dr. Dixon developed a tissue engineered in vitro model to recapitulate lipid uptake by intestinal lymphatics.

Dixon began at the Georgia Institute of Technology in August 2009 as an assistant professor. Prior to his current appointment, he was a staff scientist at École Polytechnique Fédérale de Lausanne (Swiss Federal Institute of Technology - Lausanne) doing research on tissue-engineered models of the lymphatic system. Dr. Dixon received his Ph.D. from Texas A&M in biomedical engineering while working in the Optical Biosensing Laboratory, where he developed an imaging system for measuring lymphatic flow and estimating wall shear stress in contracting lymphatic vessels.
