= Virat (disambiguation) =

Virat is an Indian male given name. It most commonly refers to Virat Kohli, an Indian cricketer.

Virat may also refer to:

- Virat Singh (born 1997), an Indian cricketer
- Virat Vachirarattanawong (born 1947), Thai Muay Thai and professional boxing promoter

== See also ==
- VIRAT
- Viraat (disambiguation)
- Virata (disambiguation)
