= Brandon Clark =

Brandon Clark or Clarke may refer to:

== Sports ==
- Brandon Clark (athlete) (born 1993), Australian long jumper in the 2014 Oceania Athletics Championships
- Brandon Clark (born 1993), American basketball player (2013–14 Santa Clara Broncos men's basketball team)
- Brandon Clarke (chess player) (born 1995), English chess player
- Brandon Clarke (1996–2026), Canadian-American basketball player
- Brandon Clarke (baseball) (born 2003), American baseball player

== Others ==
- Brandon Clark Band in Diversafest
- Brandon Clark, contestant in The Voice (U.S. season 3)
- Brandon Clark, convicted in the murder of Bianca Devins

== See also ==
- Clark Brandon, actor
