= Brandon Dewayne Johnson =

American spree killer (born 1988)

- Johnson after his arrest on January 15, 2009
- Born: January 18, 1988 (age 38); Little Rock, Arkansas, U.S.
- Status: Incarcerated
- Convictions: First degree murder (3 counts); First degree battery; Aggravated robbery (3 counts); Robbery; Theft of property (3 counts); Writing a hot check of $1,000 or less
- Penalty: 100 years imprisonment

Details
- Span of crimes: September 2008 – January 13, 2009
- Country: United States
- Location: Little Rock, Arkansas
- Killed: 3
- Injured: 8
- Weapon: .380-caliber handgun
- Date apprehended: January 15, 2009
- Imprisoned at: Cummins Unit

Brandon Dewayne Johnson (born January 18, 1988) is an American serial killer who killed three men and wounded eight others during a series of violent robberies between September 2008 and January 2009 in Little Rock, Arkansas. After he was found to be mentally disabled, Johnson pleaded guilty to three counts of first-degree murder and other charges and was sentenced to 100 years in prison.

== Murders ==
In September 2008, Johnson, who was on probation for a misdemeanor car theft and a misdemeanor check fraud charge, embarked on a violent crime spree in Little Rock, Arkansas. He committed multiple armed robberies. Most of the victims were Hispanic. Three men were killed and eight others were wounded. Johnson later pleaded guilty to four specific shootings, including all of the fatal ones. He used a .380-caliber handgun to commit his crimes.

On November 15, Armando Guerrero and his friend, Andy Tapia, were leaving a friend's apartment when Johnson approached them and asked to use cellphone. When Tapia and Guerrero said they didn't have a phone, Johnson robbed them at gunpoint. Afterwards, he shot Guerrero in the torso. Guerrero survived his injuries.

On November 17, Jairo Castorena-Mendez was leaving his sister's apartment to go to work when he saw Johnson, who was wearing a mask from the movie Scream standing near the doorway. Castorena-Mendez shut the door, but Johnson fired through it, hitting him in his right arm. Castorena-Mendez survived his injuries.

On December 10, Johnson got into an argument with two other men after a hit and run incident and opened fire on them. Nobody was hurt, but a man named Shamar Womack crashed and abandoned his car after being fired at. Detectives talked to Womack's girlfriend, who owned the car. She said she had lent the car to her boyfriend. When the detectives went to Womack, he said Johnson had shot at him.

On December 18, Johnson robbed Carlos Lario at his Barrington Hills apartment and stole his wallet before fleeing. However, Johnson quickly returned and shot him in the hand. Lario survived his injuries. Roughly 10 minutes after Lario was shot, Johnson fatally shot 50-year-old Joseph Bittengle, a University of Arkansas for Medical Sciences associate professor, who lived in the same apartment complex, in the stomach as he helped his 71-year-old mother, Hazel Bittengle, pack her car to return to her home in Ohio after a visit. Johnson shot Joseph after taking his wallet. He also took Hazel's purse before fleeing. Johnson later said he targeted Joseph since he looked vulnerable. He'd previously shot a different man in the same parking lot. That man survived his injuries.

On January 13, 2009, Johnson fatally shot 26-year-old Akshaya Nandam, who he thought was Hispanic, and 24-year-old Eric German on the same day. Nandam, who'd moved to America from India four years earlier, had just dropped his girlfriend off at their apartment home and was walking outside when Johnson confronted him and demanded his wallet. He then shot him in the leg and took his wallet while he was on the ground. Nandam died of his injuries a day later after the bullet nicked an artery. Johnson would use his credit card at a McDonald's. He later confronted German, the married father of a toddler, while he was on his way to work at a McDonald's restaurant. Johnson fatally shot German after he gave up his wallet. He was arrested two days later and held without bail. While in jail, Johnson was given medication for anxiety and high blood pressure, but only took it for three days. He admitted to participating in the robberies, but claimed he was only a lookout. Shamar Womack was charged with aggravated robbery for participating in some of the robberies and Johnson's girlfriend, Victoria McCoy, was charged with using the credit cards of one of the victims.

It is not known what happened in the case of McCoy, but Womack served time in prison for aggravated robbery before being paroled. In 2014, he and another man were charged with first degree murder for participating in the slaying of 36-year-old Taurus Goins, but it is not known what became of that case.

== Guilty plea and incarceration ==
Johnson was charged with four of the robberies he committed, including the three fatal ones. Prosecutors charged him with three counts of capital murder and announced that they would pursue a death sentence. However, they dropped their request after Johnson's lawyers raised questions about his mental state. IQ testing by state doctors found that he was mentally disabled and thus ineligible for execution.

After consulting with the families of the victims, prosecutors reached a plea agreement with Johnson that called for a 100-year sentence with the possibility of parole for three counts of first degree murder and other charges. Without the plea agreement, he would have faced a mandatory life sentence without parole on the capital murder charges. Numerous other charges were dropped as part of the agreement.

During Johnson's sentencing hearing in July 2010, Judge Marion Humphrey asked him why he committed the murders. Johnson said they were a result of "bad judgement" and a poor choice of friends. Humphrey did not seem satisfied with Johnson's answer, saying "How can you just walk up to these people and shoot them?" After glancing at his attorneys, Johnson replied "Bad mistake. I apologize." Humphrey then reminded Johnson about a letter he'd been shown by prosecutors at Johnson's sanity hearing. In the letter, which was addressed to his girlfriend, Johnson claimed he had committed the robberies to buy food and diapers for children. When Humphrey asked if that was true, a nervous Johnson admitted that he was lying. "I'm trying to understand," Humphrey said. "I want to understand you. You'd take somebody's life for this?" Ultimately, Humphrey followed through on the plea agreement imposed a 100-year sentence on Johnson.

Johnson is currently serving his sentence at the Cummins Unit. He has taken two anger management courses and has been classified as a medium security inmate. Johnson has committed more than 30 infractions in prison, most recently in April 2021. The infractions include unexcused absences, disobeying orders, battery, possessing contraband, and sexual activity. Johnson will become not eligible for parole until October 12, 2071, when he is 83 years old.

== See also ==
- List of serial killers in the United States
