= Brandon Lee (disambiguation) =

Brandon Lee (1965–1993) was an American martial artist, actor, and the son of Bruce Lee.

Brandon Lee may also refer to:

- Brandon Lee (pornographic actor) (born 1979), American pornographic actor
- Brandon Lee (rugby league) (born 1964), Australian rugby league footballer
- "Brandon Lee", a song by the 69 Eyes from Blessed Be
- Brandon H. Lee, actor who appeared in Cobra Kai season 6

== See also ==
- Brandun Lee (born 1999), American professional boxer
- Brendan Lee, Australian rules football player
- Brandon Lee Rudat (born 1980), American journalist and television anchor
- Brian MacKinnon (born 1963), who posed as a student named Brandon Lee at Bearsden Academy, Scotland in 1993
