= Brandon Taylor =

Brandon Taylor may refer to:

- Brandon Taylor (American football) (born 1990), American former NFL player
- Brandon Taylor (basketball, born January 1994) (born 1994), American basketball player
- Brandon Taylor (basketball, born August 1994) (born 1994), American basketball player
- Brandon Taylor (footballer) (born 1999), English professional footballer
- Brandon Taylor (writer) (born 1989), American writer
