= Brandon Spinelly =

Mauritian radio personality

Rj Brandon Spinelly
- Born: Brandon Spinelly; Mauritius
- Occupation: Radio Jockey

Brandon Spinelly, popularly known as RJ Brandon, is a Mauritian radio jockey based in Mauritius. He is best known as the host of Radio Plus show MDR .

== Radio career ==
Year	Radio Station	Job Title	Weekdays	Weekends
2019–present	Radio Plus (Mauritius)	Radio Jockey	Allô Maurice with Brandon and Ton Simon	Weekend Show with Brandon
2014 to 2017	Radio Plus (Mauritius)	Radio Jockey	Avi et Brandon (20h-22h) 2014-2015 Ou Koner Ou (19h-22h) 2015-2016 Le Big Show (20h-22h) 2016	Le Dancefloor 21h-00hr (Samedi) Le 15-18 2016
2011 to 2014	Mauritius Broadcasting Corporation	Radio Jockey	Showtime avec Avi et Brandon (19h -22h)	Morning Groove (Saturday &Sunday 5/7)
