= Brandon Brown =

Brandon Brown may refer to:

- Brandon Brown (basketball, born 1985), American basketball player
- Brandon Brown (basketball, born 1989), American basketball player
- Brandon Brown (basketball, born 1991), American basketball player
- Brandon Brown (racing driver) (born 1993), American racing driver
- Brandon Brown (rugby union) (born 1994), South African rugby union player
- Brandon Brown, member of R&B band Mista
- Brandon Brown (American football executive) (born 1988), assistant general manager for the New York Giants
- Brandon Brown (1986–2012), American college football player killed after a game, see Murder of Brandon Brown
- Brandon B. Brown (born 1981), American lawyer
