= Brandon Childress =

Brandon Childress may refer to:

- Bam Childress (Brandon N. Childress, born 1982), American gridiron football wide receiver
- Brandon Childress (basketball) (born 1997), American basketball player
