= Brandon Bryant =

Brandon Bryant may refer to:

- Brandon Bryant (American football) (born 1995), American football safety
- Brandon Bryant (whistleblower) (born 1985), American soldier
