= Brandon Miller =

Brandon Miller may refer to:

== Sports ==
- Brandon Miller (American football) (born 1986), American football defensive end
- Brandon Miller (basketball, born 1979), American basketball coach and former player
- Brandon Miller (basketball, born 2002), American basketball player
- Brandon Miller (lacrosse) (born 1979), Canadian lacrosse goaltender
- Brandon Miller (racing driver) (born 1981), American auto racing driver
- Brandon Miller (runner) (born 2002), American athlete
- Brandon Miller (soccer) (born 1989), American soccer goalkeeper
- Brandon Nozaki Miller, American motorcyclist and software developer

== Others ==
- Brandon Miller (musician) (born 1990), American singer-songwriter
- Brandon Nozaki Miller, American software developer and motorcyclist

== See also ==
- Branden Miller (born 1991), actor and comedian
- Brendon Miller (born 1976), American pornographic actor
