= Brandon Reilly =

Brandon Reilly may refer to:

- Brandon Reilly (musician) (born 1981), lead singer and guitarist of the band Nightmare of You
- Brandon Reilly (American football) (born 1993), wide receiver
