= Brandon King =

Brandon King may refer to:

- Brandon King (cornerback) (born 1987), American football player, formerly of the Indianapolis Colts and Jacksonville Jaguars
- Brandon King (linebacker) (born 1993), American football player, currently of the Indianapolis Colts
- Brandon King (cricketer) (born 1994), Jamaican cricketer
- YNW BSlime (Brandon King; born 2007), American rapper
