= Brandon Goodwin =

Brandon Goodwin can refer to:

- Brandon Goodwin (lacrosse) (born 1991), Canadian lacrosse player
- Brandon Goodwin (basketball) (born 1995), American basketball player
