= Brandon Wong =

Brandon Wong may refer to:

- Brandon Wong (actor) (born 1971), Malaysian actor based in Singapore
- Anthony Brandon Wong (born 1965), Australian actor
