= Brandon Wilson =

Brandon Wilson may refer to:

- Brandon Wilson (actor), American actor
- Brandon Wilson (American football) (born 1994), American football safety
- Brandon Wilson (soccer), Australian footballer
- Brandon Wilson (writer) (born 1953), American travel writer
