= Brandon Thomas =

Brandon Thomas may refer to:

- Brandon Thomas (playwright) (1848–1914), English actor and playwright who wrote the hit farce, Charley's Aunt
- Brandon Thomas (musician) (born 1980), American rock band singer
- Brandon Thomas (American football) (born 1991), American football player
- Brandon Thomas (footballer) (born 1995), Spanish footballer
- Brandon Thomas-Asante (born 1998), English footballer

== See also ==
- Thomas Brandon (disambiguation)
