= Brandon Stickney =

American biographer and journalist (born 1967)

Brandon M. Stickney (born in 1967 in Lockport, New York) is an American journalist, author, and documentarian. He was a newspaper reporter at the Lockport Union-Sun & Journal from 1990 to 1995. He is the author of All-American Monster: The Unauthorized Biography of Timothy McVeigh (about Timothy McVeigh) and The Amazing Seven Sutherland Sisters: A Biography of America's First Celebrity Models (about the Seven Sutherland Sisters). Released in late 2020, Stickney's memoir is The Five People You'll Meet in Prison.

Since his release from prison in 2018, Stickney has volunteered in prison reform advocacy in Florida and in New York.

He attended Daemen College, Niagara County Community College, and graduated with a B.A. in English literature from the State University of New York at Buffalo (UB). UB's English program was noted for professors Leslie Fiedler and Robert Creeley, among others.

After five years at the Union-Sun & Journal, Stickney helped ABC News, A&E Biography, and Court TV create documentaries on the Oklahoma City bombing. He also attended Timothy McVeigh's trial in Denver. He later managed marketing and promotions at Prometheus Books. RSA, a subsidiary of Mercedes-Benz Financial, hired him as marketing manager, where he led the communications department. He remained at RSA when it was acquired by Fiserv, a banking services partner.

He continued freelance writing for various publications, including Publishers Weekly and The Buffalo News. After working as a copywriter for Stand Advertising, the Partnership, and J. Fitzgerald Group, he began a Facebook column on addiction and mental illness called "Couchsurfing". The column, along with 20 prison diaries, became The Five People You'll Meet in Prison.

== Bibliography ==
- All-American Monster: The Unauthorized Biography of Timothy McVeigh (Prometheus Books, 1996) ISBN 1-57392-088-6
- The Amazing Seven Sutherland Sisters: A Biography of America's First Celebrity Models (Niagara County Historical Society, 2012) ISBN 978-1-878233-33-2
- The Five People You'll Meet in Prison: A Memoir of Addiction, Mania & Hope (Bancroft Press, 2020) ISBN 978-1610881968
