= Brandon Wardell =

Brandon Wardell may refer to:

- Brandon Wardell (actor) (born 1975), American actor, producer and musician
- Brandon Wardell (comedian) (born 1992), American comedian

== See also ==
- Brandon Waddell (born 1994), American baseball player
