= Brandon R. Byrd =

American historian

Brandon R. Byrd is an American academic who specializes in the intellectual and social history of Black people in the United States and their interactions with Haiti. He authored the monograph The Black Republic: African Americans and the Fate of Haiti (2020) and co-edited the collection Ideas in Unexpected Places: Reimagining Black Intellectual History (2022). He teaches history at Vanderbilt University.

The Black Republic: African Americans and the Fate of Haiti (University of Pennsylvania Press, 2020) studies the perspectives of prominent Black American intellectuals on Haiti, including their proposed policies for assisting the country in its development. Some of those intellectuals, particularly Protestant ones, faulted Haiti for not doing enough to help itself, and falling short when it came to Christian morality and not fully accepting America's "capitalist ethos of self-help, patriarchy, and work ethic". The book, besides showing how complex African American attitudes towards Haiti were, particularly surrounding the 1915 United States occupation of Haiti, also studies the activities of missionaries in Haiti and the development of the Episcopal Diocese of Haiti, using material from Christian missionary publications and from Black newspapers. Kevin M. Lowe, reviewing the book for Anglican and Episcopal History, called the book "elegantly researched and written" and considered it a valuable contribution also to the history of the Protestant mission.

Byrd is co-editor, with Leslie Alexander and Russell Rickford, of Ideas in Unexpected Places: Reimagining Black Intellectual History (Evanston: Northwestern University Press, 2022).
