= Brandon Jordan =

Brandon Jordan may refer to:

- Brandon Jordan (gridiron football) (born 1988), American football player in the Canadian Football League
- Brandon Jordan, founding guitarist for punk rock band Killradio
