= Brandon Decker =

American musician (born 1980)

Brandon Decker July 8, 2010

Brandon Cameron Parks-Decker aka "decker." (born May 11, 1980) is an American singer-songwriter based out of Sedona, AZ. He performs and releases albums under the moniker decker. Decker has released 7 albums while consistently touring substantially across the United States. While performing tour stops at traditional music venues, decker. gained notoriety for almost daily impromptu street performances he and his band gave during the course of a 99-show tour for his 2010 release, Long as the Night.

Decker is known for his desert-influenced stylings, semi-autobiographical and emotionally driven songwriting, as well as the use of Biblical themes, although he professes to be an agnostic. He is also known for his unique voice which has been compared to Jack White and Shannon Hoon. Arizona music blog Yab Yum Music and Arts awarded him both 2011 Arizona Songwriter of the Year and 2012 Arizona Album of the Year (Slider) decker. is signed to Brooklyn-based label Royal Potato Family.

Decker's music is often considered singer songwriter, alt-country and indie folk, although his more recent material has been said to include elements of psychedelic rock.

== History ==
From his musical beginnings, "decker." has been the recording and performing name for the music of Brandon Decker. In 2009 Decker recorded, largely out of his home, his first album, Long Days, released on his own now defunct independent Arizona label Mescal Porch Records. He immediately followed the release with a 7-week tour of the west coast. Critics praised the album as a powerful tale of redemption rife with poignant lyrics while also retaining a simplistic, approachable catchiness.

Upon returning from the tour Decker immediately began work on his second album, Long as the Night. With the goal of a larger sound, Decker entered a Sedona studio and assembled 12 musicians to make the album. Upon releasing the 8-song album, decker. set out on a five-month, 99-show U.S. tour with the accompaniment of mandolin, trumpet, accordion, and psychedelic atmospheric guitars. The album was praised for its dramatic and emotionally enveloping subject matter. In addition to the scheduled performances, and in order to help offset some of the costs of touring, the band quite frequently took to the streets to perform and would amass large followings of onlookers.

After the extensive tour for Long as the Night, Decker went in studio again to record an EP Broken Belts, Broken Bones; an album he has said came directly from the experiences of the long tour and preparing for fatherhood. The album was released October 7, 2011.

In August 2012 the band suffered a near fatal roll-over accident with then-singer Kelly Cole ejecting from the vehicle and suffering severe injuries. The band recovered and released the album Slider in March 2013. The album was well-received and supported by extensive US touring.

In the summer of 2014 decker. assembled a large cast of musicians in Tucson, AZ to record the album Patsy. The album was recorded at WaveLab Recording Studios, known for recording artists Calexico, Neko Case, Iron & Wine, Amos Lee and more. Released in February 2016, the album received positive national reviews and radio airplay.

Patsy was followed up in September 2016 with the psychedelic blues rock album Snake River Blues, the band's 6th studio recording. The album was released with a month-long residency at New York City's Rockwood Music Hall and was accompanied by a documentary of same name. The film was made by documentary filmmaker Matty Steinkamp. Decker subsequently signed with Brooklyn-based indie label Royal Potato Family and released a 7th album, Born to Wake Up in September 2018.

Decker presently resides in Sonoma, CA.

== Discography ==
Long Days (2009), CA.

Long as the Night (2010)

Broken Belts Broken Bones EP (2011)

Slider (2013)

Patsy (2015)

Snake River Blues (2016)

Into the Red (2017) - Retrospective, plus two new tracks

Born to Wake Up (2018)

Greetings, All Ye Playful Prisoners of Spacetime (2019) - Live

Ouroboros (2023)
