= Brandon Bailey =

Brandon Bailey may refer to:

- Brandon Bailey (weightlifter) (1932–2013), Trinidad and Tobago weightlifter
- Brandon Bailey (basketball), American professional basketball coach
- Brandon Bailey (baseball) (born 1994), American professional baseball pitcher
- Brandon Bailey (American football) (born 1994), American football coach
