= Brandon Jackson =

Brandon Jackson may refer to:

- Brandon Jackson (American football) (born 1985), American football running back
- Brandon Jackson (priest) (1934–2023), British Anglican priest, Dean of Lincoln
- Brandon Jackson (rugby union), English rugby union player
- Brandon T. Jackson (born 1984), American actor/comedian

== See also ==
- Branden Jackson (born 1992), American football defensive end
- Brendan Jackson (1935–1998), Royal Air Force officer
