= Brandon McClelland =

Brandon McClelland may refer to:

- Brandon McClelland (1984/85–2008), African American man whose death sparked racial controversy in the city of Paris, Texas, see Death of Brandon McClelland
- Brandon McClelland (actor) (born 1992), Australian actor
