= Brandon Moore (criminal) =

American criminal (born 1986)

- Born: January 16, 1986 (age 40)
- Status: In prison
- Convictions: Kidnapping; Rape (3 counts); Complicity to commit rape (3 counts); Aggravated robbery (2 counts); Complicity to commit aggravated robbery
- Penalty: 141 years imprisonment; commuted to 50 years imprisonment

Details
- Victims: 1
- Date: 2001
- Country: United States
- State: Ohio
- Imprisoned at: Corrections Medical Center (2002) A434865

Brandon Moore (c. 1986) is an American man convicted for being a part of the 2001 rape of a 21-year-old female Youngstown State University student.

== Crime, convictions, and sentences ==
In 2001, when he was 15 years-old, Moore forced a 21-year-old woman [M.K.] into her car in the parking lot of her job when she showed up for her evening shift at Detroit Avenue. Moore, driving M.K.’s car, began following a black automobile. Shortly thereafter, Moore stopped the car and a second gunman exited the black automobile in front of them and entered the victim’s car through the rear passenger’s side door. The second gunman, later identified as [Chaz] Bunch, put a gun to her head and demanded her money and belongings. She now had two guns pointed at her, one from Moore and one from Bunch. After Bunch had entered the vehicle, Moore began to drive and continued to follow the black automobile. Eventually, Moore drove down a dead-end street near Pyatt Street in Youngstown, Ohio, and both automobiles pulled into a gravel lot.[1] They drove her to the Peyatt Street area in a gravel lot of a secluded area, where Moore and 2 of the other men alternated raping her while holding her at gunpoint. She was also robbed during the crime. The woman then drove to a house where she told her friends the license plate numbers of the car she was kidnapped in. The police were able to detain all four criminals involved, including Moore.

In 2002, Moore was convicted of several counts of aggravated robbery, rape, complicity to commit rape, a count of kidnapping, one count of complicity to commit aggravated robbery, and a count of aggravated menacing, including 11 firearm specifications. He was found guilty on all counts and specifications.

Moore received the maximum sentence for each count, except the menacing counts, with an additional prison term for each of the 11 gun specifications. The sentences were to be served consecutively. This resulted in a total of 141 years in prison. He was sentenced by Mahoning County Common Pleas Court Judge R. Scott Krichbaum. His sentence was eventually reduced to 50 years by Mahoning County Common Pleas Court Judge Maureen Sweeney upon appeal. Moore planned to appeal his sentence, but dropped his case in 2021, after Ohio passed a new law severely limiting long sentences and life terms for juveniles. Under the new law, Moore had a parole hearing in 2022. He was denied parole and will have his next hearing in December 2026.
