= Brandon McDonald =

Brandon McDonald may refer to:

- Brandon McDonald (gridiron football) (born 1985), American football cornerback
- Brandon McDonald (footballer) (born 1986), American soccer player
