= Brandon Voss =

American journalist and entertainment writer living in New York City

Brandon Voss is an American journalist and entertainment writer.

== Early life and education ==
Voss is from New Orleans, LA. He was born on February 16, 1978. He graduated with a Bachelor of Arts in theater from Tulane University, where he performed in various stage productions.

== Career ==
He was a contributing editor for The Advocate, a national LGBT news magazine, interviewing celebrities for the regular "A-List" column, including George Clooney, Zac Efron, and Tina Fey. He also reviewed New York theater for the "Seat Filler" column on Advocate.com.

Voss was promoted to editor-in-chief of the New York-based LGBT weekly HX magazine in December 2006. He stepped down from the position in September 2008 after nearly four years with the now-defunct publication to pursue freelance writing opportunities.

Voss was the weekend and theater editor for Logo TV’s website NewNowNext, interviewing celebrities for its monthly “Obsessed” column, including Tony Goldwyn, Regina King, and Marisa Tomei. He is also a former editor of Next, DLNQNT, and Gay.net, and he has profiled personalities for Out, Billboard, and Essential Homme. As a contributing writer for Playbill, he has interviewed celebrities such as Paul Reubens, Nick Jonas, and Bette Midler.

Voss's 2008 "Big Gay Following" interview with Adrien Brody for The Advocate sparked mild controversy: While some readers felt the questions were inappropriate, others felt Brody lacked a sense of humor.

Chris Evans famously "outed" his younger brother, actor Scott Evans, in a January 2009 Advocate interview with Voss.

Voss's August 2008 interview with Lady Gaga for HX was the pop star's first cover story and first interview in which she publicly discussed her bisexuality.

After coming out publicly as gay in 2017, actor Haaz Sleiman criticized Voss for previously asking about his sexuality in a 2009 Advocate interview, recalling that he had not been prepared to answer personal questions. Voss apologized for the “unfortunate miscommunication” in a NewNowNext post, explaining, “When writing for LGBT publications, I respectfully interview LGBT people, straight people, and those who choose not to identify publicly. But because these celebrities are speaking to LGBT press, I do offer them an opportunity to identify if they so choose, with the end goal of celebrating and normalizing all sexual identities.”

Voss is a member of GALECA, the Society of LGBTQ Entertainment Critics. He has been a repeat guest at the monthly artists’ forum Dead Darlings in New York City.

== Personal life ==
Voss is sometimes mistaken for the Werq the World party promoter who shares the same name.
