= Brandon Knight =

Brandon or Brandin Knight may refer to:

- Brandon Knight (American football) (born 1997), American football player
- Brandon Knight (baseball) (born 1975), American baseball player
- Brandon Knight (basketball) (born 1991), American basketball player
- Brandin Knight (born 1981), American basketball coach and former player
