= Brandon Williams =

Brandon Williams may refer to:

- Brandon Williams (basketball, born 1975), American basketball player
- Brandon Williams (basketball, born 1999), American basketball player
- Brandon Williams (cornerback, born 1980), American football cornerback
- Brandon Williams (cornerback, born 1992), American football cornerback for the Arizona Cardinals
- Brandon Williams (wide receiver) (born 1984), American football wide receiver
- Brandon Williams (tight end) (born 1987), American football tight end for the Miami Dolphins
- Brandon Williams (linebacker) (born 1988), American football linebacker
- Brandon Williams (cricketer) (born 1989), South African cricketer
- Brandon Williams (defensive tackle) (born 1989), American football defensive tackle for the Baltimore Ravens
- Brandon Williams (footballer) (born 2000), English association football (soccer) player
- Brandon Williams (politician) (born 1967), American politician
- Brandon Williams (born 1984), American rhythm and blues singer, known professionally as Urban Mystic

== See also ==
- Brandon Rhys-Williams (1927–1988), British Conservative politician
