= Brandon Bell =

Brandon Bell may refer to:

- Brandon Bell (American football) (born 1995), American football linebacker
- Brandon Bell (record producer), American producer and songwriter
- Brandon Bell (recording engineer), American recording engineer
- Brandon Bell (Virginia politician) (born 1958), American state senator
- Brandon P. Bell (born 1985), American actor

== See also ==
- Brandon Belt (born 1988), American baseball player
