= Brandon Fleming =

Brandon Fleming may refer to:

- Brandon Fleming (footballer) (born 1999), English professional footballer
- Brandon Fleming (writer), British playwright and screenwriter
