= Brandon Montrell =

American comedian (1979–2022)

Brandon "Boogie B" Montrell
- Born: Brandon Montrell; October 14, 1979; New Orleans, Louisiana, U.S.
- Died: December 23, 2022 (aged 43); New Orleans, Louisiana, U.S.

Comedy career
- Medium: TikTok, Stand-up, Film
- Subjects: African-American culture; everyday life; race

Brandon Montrell (October 14, 1979 – December 23, 2022), known professionally as Boogie B, was a comedian from New Orleans, Louisiana.

Montrell was born in New Orleans and spent part of his childhood in Tampa, Florida, before returning to New Orleans, where he graduated from Bonnabel High School. He then attended Delgado Community College before moving to Washington, D.C., where he began his career as a comedian. He became a well-known figure in the Los Angeles black comedy community.

Montrell developed a considerable following on TikTok, where he was known as "Boogie B." He also gained a similar following on Instagram.

Montrell appeared in the movies Into the Park and Greed and in the comedy special Comedy Bad Boys 2020.

Montrell was shot and killed on December 23, 2022, when he was caught in the crossfire of a gunfight between two men in New Orleans while he was shopping for groceries.
