= Brandon Rembert =

American baseball player and scout (born 1998)

- Born: October 17, 1998 (age 27); Pensacola, Florida, U.S.
- Education: Booker T. Washington High School Faulkner University; Coastal Alabama Community College Alcorn State University
- Occupations: Former baseball player, scout

Brandon Antonio Rembert (born October 17, 1998) is an American baseball scout and former college baseball player who played for the Alcorn State University Braves. Since 2022, Rembert has been working in various roles for the Pittsburgh Pirates of Major League Baseball (MLB).

== Early life and education ==
Rembert was born to Orenthal and Cheryl Rembert in Pensacola, Florida. He has six siblings.

Rembert graduated from Booker T. Washington High School in 2016, where he played on the baseball team as an outfielder, receiving three varsity letters. During his senior season at Washington High School, Rembert was named FACA 7A All-State. Perfect Game ranked Rembert as the 377th overall player and the 71st outfielder nationally among high school prospects in 2016.

== Career ==
Rembert briefly attended Faulkner University and played for the school's junior varsity baseball team as a freshman. For his sophomore year, he transferred to Coastal Alabama Community College and recorded a .274 batting average, 13 RBIs, and 10 runs scored while playing for the school's baseball team.

In 2018, Rembert transferred to Alcorn State University. Rembert was selected for First Team Preseason All-SWAC honors in 2020. During the 2020 baseball season, which was cut short to 12 games due to the COVID-19 pandemic, he recorded a batting average of .255, 1 home run, and 6 RBIs.

Returning for a fifth year, Rembert played his final college baseball season in 2021. That season, he was ranked the 10th overall HBCU MLB Draft prospect by Black College Nines. Rembert sustained a major hamstring injury during the 2021 pre-season, limiting his participation for the majority of his final baseball season.

== Post-playing career ==
In February 2022, began serving as a Minor League Baseball Operations Assistant for the Pittsburgh Pirates. In 2023, Rembert began serving as a development scout for the Pirates' Amateur Scouting Department. He was promoted to the role of Area Supervisor in 2024.
