= Brandon Centerwall =

American epidemiologist

- Born: 1954 (age 71–72); Los Angeles, California
- Known for: Research on media violence
- Scientific career
- Fields: Epidemiology
- Institutions: University of Washington

Brandon S. Centerwall (born 1954) is an American epidemiologist and former professor in the Department of Psychiatry and Behavioral Sciences at the University of Washington. He is known for researching the effects of media violence exposure, especially television, on homicide and assault rates. For example, in a 1989 study, he found that homicide rates in the United States and Canada doubled within twenty years of television being introduced there, as compared to homicide rates among whites in South Africa. He has also researched racial differences in domestic homicide rates, finding in 1995 that they are no longer statistically significant after controlling for socioeconomic status. His research on the prevalence of handguns and homicide rates, in which he found no statistically significant relationship between the two, has been cited favorably by some gun rights activists.
