= Brandon Robinson =

Brandon Robinson may refer to:

- Brandon Robinson (footballer) (born 1995), Dutch footballer
- Brandon Robinson (basketball) (born 1989), American NBL player
- Brandon "Scoop B" Robinson (born 1985), American sports entertainer
- Brandon Robinson (American football) (born c. 1989), American college football coach
- Brandon Robinson, Canadian CEO and co-founder of Horizon Aircraft
