= Brandon Thompson =

Brandon Thompson or Brandon Thomson may refer to:

- Brandon Thompson (American football) (born 1989), American former NFL player
- Brandon Thompson, American firefighter who died in the Charleston Sofa Super Store fire
- Brandon Thompson, American drummer in The Waiting (band)
- Brandon Thomson (born 1995), South African rugby union player
