= Branden Becker =

American baseball player (born 1996)

- Infielder
- Born: September 13, 1996 (age 29); Redlands, California, U.S.
- Bats: Left Throws: Right

Branden Becker (born September 13, 1996) is an American former professional baseball infielder. He was drafted by the Baltimore Orioles in the 17th round of the 2015 Major League Baseball draft. He was later a minor league coach in the Orioles organization.

== Professional career ==
Branden attended Cajon High School in San Bernardino, California. He played shortstop and was also a pitcher on the varsity baseball team for all four of his years at Cajon. In Becker's last seasons, his record was 23–4. Becker signed a letter of intent to attend the University of Oregon. The Baltimore Orioles drafted Becker with the 523rd overall pick in the 17th round of the 2015 Major League Baseball draft.

Becker signed with the Orioles on June 11, 2015. He was assigned to the Gulf Coast League Orioles, where he would spend the 2015 season and hit .219/.298/.238. Becker remained with the GCL Orioles in 2016, slashing .226/.260/.258 in 37 games. He would be promoted to the High-A Frederick Keys in 2017 and also played for the Low-A Aberdeen IronBirds that year, posting a .267/.267/.433 batting line. However, Becker missed much of the 2017 season after undergoing left shoulder surgery. Becker played with the Single-A Delmarva Shorebirds in 2018, slashing .273/.328/.352 with career-highs in home runs (four) and RBI (41). He began the 2019 season with Aberdeen before announcing his retirement on May 17, 2019, at the age of 22.

== Coaching career ==
On November 25, 2019, Becker was announced as the fundamentals coach for the Low-A Aberdeen IronBirds for the 2020 season. However, the minor league season was canceled because of the COVID-19 pandemic. On March 3, 2021, Becker was announced as a hitting coach for the rookie-level Florida Complex League Orioles. He was the hitting coach for the Double-A Bowie Baysox in 2022.
