= Brandon (musician) =

American musician

Brandon is an American Latin freestyle-pop artist born and raised in San Jose, California.

Lead vocalist Brandon Michaels, dancers, Peter Gabel, and Joe Gabel who all hailed from San Jose California topped the charts in the early 1990s. In 1991, the band had a hit with the gold single, "Kisses in the Night," background vocals by Charlie Pennachio, and Wyatt Pauley "guitar" from Linear. In 1990, Linear had a hit with the gold single, "Sending All My Love," which was released on Atlantic Records and hit number 5 on the Billboard Hot 100. Kisses in the Night was released on Alpha/Polygram Records in 1991 and hit number 49 on the Billboard Hot 100. Brandon also released on the Alpha Intl Records a dance underground hit single "DESTINY,".

As of 2026, he is still performing.
