= Brandon Colby =

American physician

Brandon Ross Colby is an American physician in Beverly Hills, California and physician specializing in predictive medicine and genetic testing. He is author of Outsmart Your Genes, a book about genetics published in 2011, and he is the founder and CEO of direct-to-consumer genetic testing service Sequencing.

== Early life and education ==
Colby was born with epidermolysis bullosa simplex (EB), a rare genetic disease that causes heat-sensitivity of the skin, leading to blisters on the hands and feet when skin temperature rises. Because of his condition he had an interest in genetics early in life.

Colby holds a degree in genetics from the University of Michigan, a 2004 Medical Doctorate from Mount Sinai School of Medicine, and a 2007 Master of Business Administration from Stanford University's Graduate School of Business.

== Career ==
Colby founded Existence Genetics in 2005 during his second year at Stanford. The business declared bankruptcy on November 21, 2012. Existence Genetics was a genetic analysis and genetic reporting company that provided the healthcare industry and health & wellness organizations with information about their clients' genes.

Colby was also medical director of Existence Health, a medical practice founded in 2010 and based in Los Angeles that provided predictive medicine services to its patients based upon a person's genes.

=== Sequencing ===
Colby founded Sequencing (sequencing.com), which launched in September 2016. It hosts genomic sequencing data for individuals and for researchers, an API through which third parties can interface with the data, and an app store. The app store allows purchase of further genetic data interpretation, such as results for Alzheimer's disease. Genomics Personalized Health provides genomic sequencing, EncrypGen provides secure data transfer with blockchain, and Sequencing hosts genomic data and offers interpretation of results. A patent assigned to sequencing.com was filed in 2014.

In 2022, Sequencing raised five million dollars in a round of venture capital financing. Sequencing has been profiled as a "key company" in ResearchandMarkets.com's whole genome and exome market research reports since 2021.

== Publications ==
Colby co-authored "Congenital erythropoietic porphyria: identification and expression of eight novel mutations in the uroporphyrinogen III synthase gene", which appeared in British Journal of Haematology in 2002. In 2010, Penguin Random House published Colby's Outsmart Your Genes (ISBN 9780399536380), a book about genetic testing and predictive medicine.

== Media appearances ==
In April 2011, Colby appeared on the "How to Outsmart Your Genes" episode of the TV show The Doctors. Existence Genetics performed genetic testing on several of the show's guests and Colby discussed the results. The testing focused on male pattern baldness, sexual compatibility, preconception, and disease predisposition.

Colby has also appeared on ABC's Good Morning America in April, 2010, and the Today Show with Megyn Kelly in 2018.

== See also ==
- Anne Wojcicki
- Helix (genomics company)
- Gilad Japhet
