= Brandon Nicholson =

American nonprofit executive (born 1983/84)

Brandon Nicholson is a non profit professional who serves as an executive director of The Hidden Genius Project. The Hidden Genius project strives to find hidden geniuses in underserved communities and to provide a platform that allows young black males to succeed. Nicholson emphasizes the importance of leadership and mentorship within all stages of these individuals lives.

== Education and early life ==
Nicholson was born in 1983/1984, in Oakland California. He grew up with his parents who were trained as lawyers and set a foundation for Brandon. He turned to his parents and immediate family for support all throughout his life and his journey during this project.

Nicholson received the Ron Brown scholarship when he was 17, that stood for fostering "lifelong goodwill.” He then attended UCLA and Princeton, as well as UC Berkeley for his PhD. Throughout his time in college, he was a part of programs like Community House, Black Student Union, and the Black Men’s Awareness Group that jumpstarted his passion for leadership. As a black male in college, he noticed the needed efforts in giving people services for innovation.

== Career ==
In 2012, Nicholson became the executive director of a nonprofit organization, the Hidden Genius Project which trains and mentors young black males. Based in Oakland, California, it focuses on services for individuals in technology, entrepreneurship, and leadership. The Hidden Genius Project is a program that helps about 20 boys at a time, from grades 9-11, to look at their potential and future goals, free of cost. Each participant receives a laptop where they are required to commit to two summer sessions, as well as 15 months of weekly classes. After these sessions when the training is over, each individual leaves with a fully functioning app and the skills needed to launch it. The Hidden Genius Project has many sponsors like Microsoft, Google, Human Capital, and CapitalG that make it possible for them to serve their community.

== Views ==
Nicholson strives to provide resources for young black males to succeed. The Hidden Genius Project allows for their goals and aspirations to be reached. Through various resources and mentors these students learn and develop before entering the real world. Students are more likely to succeed when they see people like them within their intended field.
