= Brandon Allen =

Brandon Allen may refer to:

- Brandon Allen (baseball) (born 1986), American baseball first baseman
- Brandon Allen (American football) (born 1992), American football quarterback
- Brandon Allen (soccer) (born 1993), American soccer player
