= Brandon Tory =

American entrepreneur, software engineer, and artist

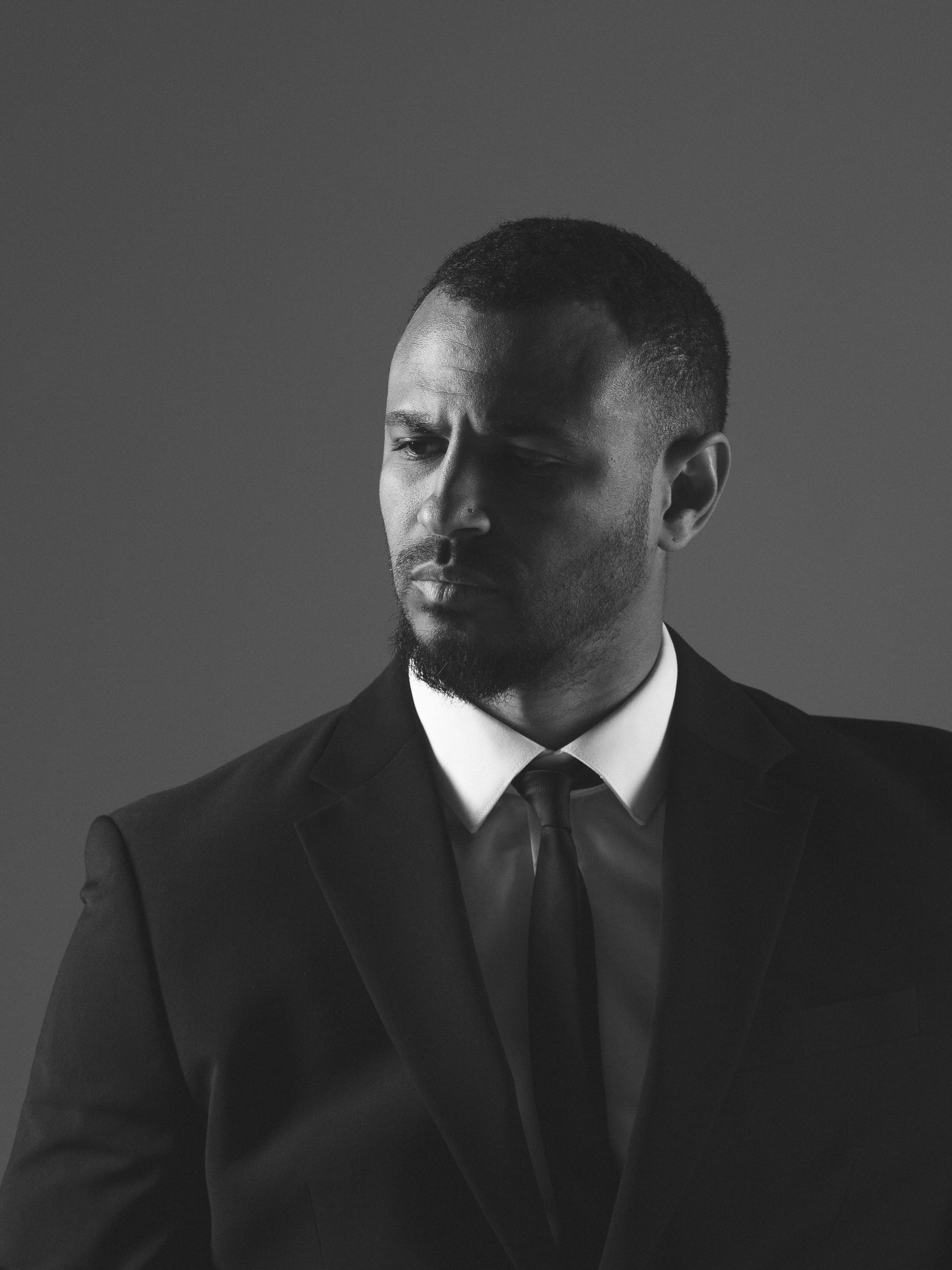

Brandon Tory Thorpe is an American entrepreneur, software engineer, and artist. He is the founder of Formless, Inc., a technology company focused on digital ownership and revenue-sharing infrastructure, and is known for his work in software engineering, artificial intelligence, and music.

== Early life ==
Thorpe was born in the Boston area and raised in Brockton, Massachusetts. He attended the University of Massachusetts Amherst, where he studied electrical engineering. During his teenage years, he taught himself computer programming and software development.

== Career ==
Thorpe began his engineering career at Teradyne, where he worked on embedded systems and device driver software. He later joined Apple as a software engineer and subsequently became a staff engineer at Google, where he worked on artificial intelligence technologies.

Thorpe founded Formless, Inc., a technology company that developed SHARE Protocol, a blockchain-based platform for revenue sharing and digital ownership. In 2023, Formless announced a $2.2 million pre-seed funding round that included participation from a16z Crypto.

== Recognition ==
Thorpe was featured in The Wall Street Journal article "When Your Day Job Isn't Enough," which profiled professionals pursuing careers outside their primary occupations.

CNBC featured Thorpe in its Young Success series in an article about his career in software engineering and music.

Forbes profiled Thorpe in the article "Google A.I. Engineer/Rapper Wants Kids To Know It's Cool To Be A Genius."
