= Carder England =

American poker player (1988-2024)

- Nickname: + to the EV!
- Born: January 19, 1988; Gainesville, Georgia, U.S.
- Died: May 4, 2024 (aged 36)

World Series of Poker
- Money finishes: 4

Carder Stephen England (January 19, 1988 − May 4, 2024) was an American professional poker player.

== Online poker ==
Known for beginning at the lowest stakes and grinding his way up from the bottom, England's multi-table tournament online winnings exceeded $1,000,000. This included multiple wins in the Full Tilt Poker $100 Rebuy tournament and multiple Sunday Major final tables, including taking 4th place in the Full Tilt Poker Sunday Brawl and 4th in the Poker Stars Sunday $500.

=== Coaching ===
Carder England was a coach at online forum pocketfives.com. He released videos and coached over the internet.

== Live poker ==
=== World Series of Poker ===
He made his WSOP debut for England at the 2009 World Series of Poker with two cashes totaling $9,432.

In 2010, he cashed again twice for a total of $17,612.

=== Turning Stone Casino ===
England made his first live appearance at Turning Stone Casino. Before the age of 21, he managed to cash his first event doubling his money at the Heartland Poker Tour. He followed that up with two cashes at the Turning Stone Casino March Madness event the following year with his best finish was a 4th-place finish in the main event for $15,883.
