= Brandon Hall =

Brandon Hall may refer to:

- Brandon Micheal Hall (born 1993), American actor
- Brandon Hall (American football) (born 1976), American football coach
- Bug Hall (born 1985), American actor
- Brandon Hall (Washington, Mississippi), a historic house
- Brandon Hall (McMaster University), a student residence
- Brandon Hall School, a grade 6–12 school in Sandy Springs, Georgia
- Brandon Hall station, a light rail stop in Brookline, Massachusetts
