= Johan Barkhuizen =

South African cricketer (born 1982)

Johan Barkhuizen (born 1 September 1982) was a South African cricketer. He was a right-handed batsman and a rightarm medium-fast bowler who played for Limpopo. He was born in Pretoria.

Barkhuizen made two first-class appearances for the team, scoring 27 runs in four innings, and bowling 16 complete overs, though he failed to take a wicket in first-class cricket.

Barkhuizen made a single one-day appearance, scoring 12 runs in the only innings in which he batted, and taking figures of 2–58 with the ball in 8 overs.
