= Brandon Turner =

American skateboarder (born 1981)

- Born: 1981 or 1982 (age 42–43)

Brandon Turner (born 1981 or 1982), also known as Lil B, is an American professional skateboarder.

== Career ==
External videos
- Brandon Turner on his Switch Hardflip

Brandon Turner, born 1981 or 1982, was a youth prodigy skateboarder. Also known as "Lil B", Turner rode with Chad Muska's Shorty's group and came of age during a time of lavish excess for skateboarding, including alcohol and drugs. Following some injuries and time in prison, Turner went through a period of recovery. After turning sober in the late 2010s, he began mentoring in addiction recovery programs, and returned to skateboarding in what The New York Times called "an impressive late-career renaissance".
