= Brandon Anderson (businessman) =

American sociologist and entrepreneur

Brandon D. Anderson is an American sociologist and entrepreneur. He founded Raheem.ai, a chatbot which helps the public monitor police interactions. He was the 2018 Echoing Green Black Male Achievement Fellow and is a 2019 TED fellow. In August 2024, several of Anderson's claims about his chatbot and personal history were questioned in an investigative article in The New York Times.

== Early life ==
Anderson was born in Oklahoma. His mother is a rental car clerk and his father a forklift truck driver. He has described his childhood as being "characterised by violence," and said that he was made homeless after being kicked out of his grandparents house as a teenager. Anderson said that his best friend went homeless with him and they later fell in love. Anderson enlisted in the Army in 2003, where he worked as a satellite engineer. Anderson stated that he was discharged from the Army after disclosing his sexuality.

In 2007, while Anderson was serving as an engineer in the army overseas, he alleged that his partner was shot and killed by a police officer during a routine traffic stop. An August 2024 article in The New York Times suggested that Anderson fabricated this story, as "no homicide in the entire state of Oklahoma involved a man named Raheem, nor did any match the particulars of the officer-involved death Mr. Anderson had described."

== Education and career ==
Anderson became a community activist and organiser, earning a degree at Georgetown University in 2015. At Georgetown he studied sociology and philosophy. He served as a Racial Equity Fellow at the Washington, D.C. Center for the Study of Social Policy. Anderson learned that the majority of people don't report negative interactions with police officers because they "do not trust the system".

In 2014 Anderson was awarded money from Fast ForWord and the My Brother's Keeper Challenge to build Raheem.ai, a Facebook messenger chatbot that eliminates barriers to reporting police misconduct. The chatbot allowed the public to evaluate police interactions and offers follow-on support for users. Raheem.ai was inspired by Waze, who, alongside offering navigation information, used user-generated information to inform local government about fill potholes. The chatbot asked questions about recent interactions with the police, anonymized the data that was collected, and shared them in real-time to a public dashboard on police performance. Raheem.ai published reports about where police are working well and where they are failing communities. It aimed to reach all fifty states by 2020. With Raheem.ai, Anderson looked to build the first crowdsourced database of police interactions.

In 2016 Anderson delivered a TED talk at Georgetown, where he discussed what it means to be vulnerable. He was named as one of the National Black Justice Coalition 100 Black LGBTQ/SGL Emerging Leaders. Anderson was made an Echoing Green Fellow in 2018.

=== Raheem issues ===
Raheem.ai was never able to overcome a fundamental problem: that the US' thousands of separate police agencies have their own individual ways of preferred contact. David Fahrenthold of The New York Times wrote in August 2024:

Mr. Anderson's complaint system — "Yelp for police," he called it — did not work. His website collected more than 2,700 stories from users about their interactions with police — accounts of unjustified traffic stops, physical assaults and harassment. But the work had little impact because Raheem was unable to solve a mind-bending technical problem.

There are 18,000 police departments in America. Some accept complaints online, but many require people to make a phone call or go to a police station. Raheem failed because it never offered a one-stop way for users to file their complaints directly with police.

[...] For now, his nonprofit appears legally active, but functionally dead. Several donors pulled their funding. Three employees were left out of work.

=== Scrutiny and legal troubles ===
In August 2024, The New York Times scrutinized Anderson's financial practices while heading Raheem.ai. They included large sums for hotels and clothing that were billed to the non-profit. The Washington DC Attorney General's Office filed an injunction and lawsuit saying that Anderson and Raheem.ai misused funds for the lavish lifestyle of Anderson.

In November 2024, Attorney General Attorney General Brian L. Schwalb sued Raheem AI, a nonprofit created to improve transparency and accountability in policing, and its founder and Executive Director Brandon Anderson for violating the District’s nonprofit and workers’ rights laws. Anderson used Raheem AI’s charitable funds for his own personal benefit - specifically to support his luxurious lifestyle - while the organization failed to monitor spending or implement basic nonprofit governance requirements. Anderson and Raheem AI also failed to pay the organization’s sole District-based employee the wages she had earned and required her to sign an illegal non-compete clause.
