= Brandon Woods =

Australian violinist (born 1998)

- Born: 10 February 1998 (age 28); Hervey Bay, Queensland, Australia
- Genres: Electronic, instrumental, folk
- Occupations: Violinist, musician, recording artist, music producer
- Instrument: Violin
- Years active: 2013–present
- Website: brandonwoodsviolin.com

Brandon Woods is an Australian violinist, composer and music producer who is currently based in Brisbane, Queensland. He gained wide attention after the release of his electronic dance music single "Vortex," and winning three gold medals, and three Champion of the World titles, at the World Championships of Performing Arts in July 2016.

== Personal life ==
Brandon was born in Hervey Bay, Queensland and moved to Brisbane in February, 2016 to pursue his music career and study at university. He graduated from Queensland University of Technology with a Bachelor of Music, then moved to Orlando, Florida to work with The Walt Disney Company in 2019. Having returned to Australia in February 2020, he is working on new music for release in late 2020.

== Career ==
In 2014, at the age of 16, Woods released his debut EP titled Violectricity, which featured five original tracks. After the release of his first record, Brandon gained wide attention throughout Australia and worldwide via his official Facebook page and YouTube channel. By popular demand, he released three digital singles, titled "Pulse Rider," "Cyberfiddle" and "Vortex." Woods released his first music video for his single "Cyberfiddle" on 23 October 2015.

Brandon was named a national finalist from the International Worldstars Association in 2015, and was selected to compete in the World Championships of Performing Arts in 2016, held in Long Beach, California. He was awarded with three gold medals for his three performance categories, which were 'Instrumental Original Works,' 'Instrumental Contemporary,' and 'Instrumental Open,' and was also awarded Champion of the World titles for each of the categories. His social media presence and success has since gained him guest appearances on Australia's Got Talent, the Royal Queensland Show, also known as Ekka's, nightly arena show titled EkkaNITES, and Australia-wide radio interviews with ABC and Sea FM. On 5 August 2016 Brandon released his first full-length album titled Immortal Symphony. On 28 September 2016 the official music video for his song "Generation X" was released on his YouTube channel, which was filmed at Kangaroo Point Cliffs in Brisbane.

As well a musician, Woods is a video blogger and a YouTuber in his spare time.

== Discography ==
=== Studio albums ===
- Immortal Symphony (2016)

=== EPs ===
- Violectricity (2014)

=== Singles ===
- "Pulse Rider" (2014)
- "Cyberfiddle" (2015)
- "Vortex" (2016)
- "Neon" (2017)
- “Demolition” (2018)
- “Galactic Spark (feat. Dolly Daydream)” (2018)
- “Activate” (2020)
