= Brandon Barkhuizen =

South African football player

Personal information
- Full name: Brandon Barkhuizen
- Date of birth: 9 August 1990 (age 36)
- Position: Right-back

Youth career
- Bidvest Wits

Senior career*
Years	Team	Apps	(Gls)
2009–2010	Bidvest Wits	4	(0)
- * Club domestic league appearances and goals

Brandon Barkhuizen (born 9 August 1990) is a South African former soccer player who played as a defender for Bidvest Wits in the Premier Soccer League.
