= Brandon Viret =

South African cricketer (born 1988)

Brandon Viret (born Vincent Brandon Viret on 4 July 1988) is a South African cricketer. He is a right-handed batsman and left-arm medium-fast bowler who plays for Eastern Province. He was born in Cape Town.

Viret made his first-class debut for the side during the 2009–10 season, against Gauteng. In the first innings in which he bowled, he took two wickets.
