= Brenda =

- Pronunciation: /ˈbrɛndə/ BREN-də
- Gender: Female
- Language: English

Other names
- See also: Brendan

Brenda is a feminine given name in the English language.

== Origin ==
The overall accepted origin for the female name Brenda is the Old Nordic male name Brandr meaning both torch and sword: evidently the male name Brandr took root in areas of the British Isles under Nordic dominance and through being heard as "Brenda" was eventually adopted as a female name. The name Brenda was probably influenced by Gaelic male name Brendan: although linguistically it is unlikely that the name Brendan would yield the name Brenda as its feminine form, the name Brenda is widely considered a feminine form of the name Brendan in Ireland, Scotland, and Wales.

== History ==
=== The British Isles ===
Occurring in the medieval legend of Madoc—the purported son of the 12th century historical Welsh ruler Owain Gwynedd by Brenda the daughter of a Viking overlord in Ireland—the name Brenda was apparently until the 19th century confined to the Northern Isles being an evident remnant of the Northern Isles' Norse rule from 875 to 1470. The name's utilization by Sir Walter Scott for the heroine of his 1821 novel The Pirate - set in Shetland - is credited with bringing the name Brenda into general usage throughout the British Isles although the initial appearance of The Pirate generated no evident vogue for the name Brenda, and while the Late Victorian children's author Georgina Castle Smith, first published in 1873, made the name Brenda well-known via Castle Smith using Brenda as her mononymous pseudonym (as suggested by her mother for no known reason), actual significant usage of the name in the British Isles is only in evidence from the early 20th century with the name Brenda ranking for the first time as a top 100 name for newborn girls in England and Wales in the 1920s (e.g. #58 in 1924).

The first evident celebrity to be named Brenda was "bright young thing" extraordinaire Brenda Dean Paul whose "party girl" career afforded her a high society press profile from the mid-1920s: she was a member of the same social circle as writer Evelyn Waugh who gave the first name Brenda to a "bright young thing" who was a major character in Waugh's 1934 novel A Handful of Dust, a rare example of the name Brenda occurring in highbrow literature. From 1931 media attention on Brenda Dean Paul was focused on her substance addictions and legal woes: "in and out of rehab and court... she became a tabloid fixture that the public loved to hate." However, the negative associations of such tabloid press headlines as "Brenda Jailed Again" had no evident adverse effect on usage of the name Brenda in the British Isles of the 1930s, that decade affording the name Brenda its peak usage in England and Wales (e.g. #16 in 1934): still popular in the 1940s (e.g. #22 in 1944) the name Brenda had in 1954 dropped to #52 on the tally of the 100 most popular girls names for newborns in England and Wales with the name being absent on the respective tallies by 1964. In 2013, the name Brenda according to the ONS was given to a total of six newborn girls in England in 2013.

In Scotland, the name Brenda was first heavily used in the 1940s: ranked at #47 on the tally of the most popular names for newborn girls in Scotland for the year 1950, the name Brenda remained popular in Scotland until the 1970s when its popularity took a steep drop: in 2014, 14 newborn girls in Scotland were registered as being named Brenda. According to the CSO the name Brenda, which in 1964 had been #63 on the tally for names given newborn girls in Ireland, was not given to any newborn girls in Ireland in 2014.

In 1971, the UK satirical magazine Private Eye ran a pseudo-item that Queen Elizabeth II "is known as Brenda to her immediate staff" resulting in the name Brenda being used in the media as an irreverent nickname for the Queen. A cross-dressed impersonation of the Queen was a standard routine of comedian Stanley Baxter who never identified his character as a parody of the Queen instead calling "herself" the Duchess of Brenda.

=== The United States ===
In the US, the name Brenda first acquired a high profile in the mid-1930s, as the press began charting the "career" of "celebutante" Brenda Frazier.

Named for her mother, whose own father Frederick Williams-Taylor was the son of Irish emigrants to Canada, Brenda Frazier had first been mentioned in the press as a pre-teen due to her parents' 1925–26 high-profile divorce and subsequent parental custody battle over Frazier, whose first name of Brenda, consequently, began appearing in the annual tally of the Top 1000 most popular names for newborn American girls from 1925, when it was ranked at #977.

As Brenda Frazier's name began appearing in the society pages when she was a teenager in the mid-1930s, the name Brenda began rising in the yearly tallies for the top names given newborn American girls: ranked at #423 in the respective tally for the year 1937 the name Brenda was ranked at #241 on the respective tally for 1938, the year of Frazier's coming-out ball, held following months of avid publicity. The full-force of Frazier's 27 December 1938 coming-out ball — which generated headlines fêting her as "the debutante of the century" — was evident when the name Brenda appeared for the first time among the Top 100 names for newborn American girls — at #86 — in the tally for the subsequent year 1939, with the cachet with which Frazier imbued the name Brenda evidenced by two Hollywood movie studios conferring the name on their respective 1939 "discoveries": Brenda Joyce and Brenda Marshall (although neither actress would herself generate significant star-power).

It was also on account of Brenda Frazier that cartoonist Dale Messick utilized "Brenda" as the first name for the heroine of the comic strip Brenda Starr, Reporter which debuted 30 June 1940; Messick would state in a 1986 interview that prior to Brenda Frazier becoming a society page staple "I had never heard the name Brenda". Although Brenda Frazier's own vogue soon ebbed, the initial popularity she'd afforded the name Brenda was evidently reinforced by the success of Brenda Starr, Reporter: ranked as the #42 most popular name for American newborn girls as tallied for the year 1940, the name Brenda accrued favor so as to rank at #21 on the respective tally for 1948 with a subsequent 17-year tenure in the Top 20, with its strongest showing #11 on the tally for the year 1961 the year singer Brenda Lee had her career peak.

Last ranked in the Top 50 of the most popular names for American newborn girls in the tally for 1972 — at #44 — the name Brenda made its last Top 100 ranking to date — at #91 — on the respective tally for the year 1977.

== People named Brenda ==
- Brenda, the pen name of English writer Georgina Castle Smith (1845–1933)
- Brenda Agüero (born 1995), Argentine nurse and serial killer
- Brenda Archer (born 1942), Guyanese high jumper
- Brenda Austin (born 1981), Argentine politician
- Brenda Bailey, Canadian politician
- Brenda C. Barnes (1953–2017), American businesswoman
- Brenda Beenhakker (born 1977), Dutch badminton player
- Brenda Bell (1891–1979), pioneer amateur radio operator from New Zealand
- Brenda Benet, American actress
- Brenda Bennett, American singer, member of Vanity 6 and Appolonia 6
- Brenda Blethyn, British actress
- Brenda Sue Brown (1955–1966), American murder victim
- Brenda Bruce, British actress
- Brenda Bufalino, American tap dancer
- Brenda Buttner, American newscaster
- Brenda Castillo, Dominicano volleyball player
- Brenda Chapman, American film director
- Brenda Cowling, British actress
- Brenda Dacres, British politician
- Brenda Davies, wife of Robertson Davies
- Brenda de Banzie, British actress
- Brenda Dean (1943–2018), British trade unionist and politician
- Brenda Dean Paul (1907–1959), British actress and socialite
- Brenda Dervin, American Professor, The Ohio State University
- Brenda Dickson, American actress, originated the role of Jill Foster on The Young and the Restless
- Brenda Lee Eager, American R&B singer
- Brenda Edwards, British singer
- Brenda Eisler, Canadian long jumper
- Brenda Evans, American R&B singer (The Undisputed Truth)
- Brenda Fajardo, Filipina visual artist and printmaker
- Brenda Fassie, South African pop singer
- Brenda Fisher (1927–2022), English swimmer
- Brenda Frazier, American socialite
- Brenda Frese (born 1970), American basketball player
- Brenda Fricker, Irish actress
- Brenda Gibbs, Australian politician
- Brenda Gilbert, Canadian film producer
- Brenda Hale, Baroness Hale of Richmond, first female Lord of Appeal in Ordinary
- Brenda Hiatt, American novelist
- Brenda Holloway, American R&B singer
- Brenda Jones, American R&B singer (The Jones Girls)
- Brenda Jagger, British novelist
- Brenda Joyce (1917–2009), American film actress
- Brenda Joyce, American novelist
- Brenda Kirk (1951-2015), South African tennis player
- Brenda Lee, iconic American rock 'n roll singer
- Brenda Maddox, American Briton biographer
- Brenda Major, American psychologist
- Brenda Marshall, American actress
- Brenda Matthews (born 1949), New Zealand sprinter
- Brenda Muntemba (1970–2019), Zambian high commissioner to Kenya
- Brenda Navarro (born 1982), Mexican writer
- Brenda Page (died 1978), British murder victim
- Brenda Payton, American R&B singer (Brenda & the Tabulations)
- Brenda Pye (1907–2005), British artist
- Brenda Robertson, Canadian politician
- Brenda Romero, American game designer
- Brenda Russell, American singer/songwriter
- Brenda Snipes, American supervisor of elections in Florida
- Brenda Sue Schaefer, murder victim
- Brenda Schultz-McCarthy, Dutch former tennis player
- Brenda Song (born 1988), American actress and singer on the Disney Channel
- Brenda Ann Spencer, American convicted murderer
- Brenda K. Starr, American freestyle singer
- Brenda Stauffer, American field hockey player
- Brenda Steady, American politician
- Brenda Strong (born 1960), American actress and yoga instructor
- Brenda Tuosto (born 1989), Swiss politician
- Brenda Ueland, American writer
- Brenda Vaccaro, Italian-American actress
- Brenda Venus, American actress, writer, and director
- Brenda Villa, Mexican-American polo player
- Brenda Wairimu, (born 1989) Kenyan actress and model
- Brenda Wambui, Kenyan political journalist, blogger, podcaster and feminist activist
- Brenda Weathers (1936–2005), American activist and writer
- Brenda Gail Webb, the birth name of Crystal Gayle, American singer
- Brenda Willis, American politician
- Brenda Wootton, Cornish folk singer
- Brenda Yeoh, Singaporean academic and geographer

== Fictional characters ==
- Brenda, a character in the manga series Lady!!
- Brenda Barrett, character on the soap opera General Hospital
- Brenda Chenowith, character in Six Feet Under
- Brenda Jenkins, character in the sitcom 227
- Brenda Leigh Johnson, the character from the American police television series The Closer
- Brenda Meeks, character in the Scary Movie film series played by Regina Hall
- Brenda Walker (Emmerdale)
- Brenda Walsh, character on Beverly Hills 9010
