= Brendan (given name) =

- Breandán in a Gaelic type
- Pronunciation: BREN-dan
- Gender: Male
- Language: English

Origin
- Language: Irish
- Origin: Breandán

Other names
- Cognates: Brandon, Breanndán, Brénainn, Brendanus, Brendon, Brenden
- See also: Brenda, Brennan

Brendan is an Irish masculine given name in the English language. It is derived from the Gaelic name Breandán, which is in turn derived from the earlier Old Irish Brénainn. The Old Welsh breenhin is the root of the name, meaning 'prince' or 'king'. The mediaeval Latin form of the name, Brendanus, has also influenced the modern English and Irish forms. Variant spellings are Brendon and Brenden. In some cases it is possible that the given name Brandon is also a variant of Brendan.

== Etymology ==
The English Brendan is an Anglicised form of the Irish Breandán, in turn derived from the Old Irish Brénainn. This Old Irish personal name (pronounced [br'ēn-in']) is derived from a borrowing of the Old Welsh word breenhín, meaning 'a prince'. Both the English form and the modern Irish form, Breandán, are based upon the mediaeval Latin form Brendanus. According to one old Irish text there are 17 saints with the name. When used in an Irish sentence it can mutate to take the form Bhreandán, for example A Bhreandáin or ..do Bhreandán. Variations of the Irish Breandán are Breanndán, Bhreandán and Bhreandáin.

There is no etymological link with the feminine given name Brenda, which is thought to be derived from the Old Norse element brand, meaning '(flaming) sword'. In most cases, the masculine given name Brandon, pronounced /ˈbrændən/, is considered to be derived from the surname Brandon, which is in turn derived from two Old English elements.

=== Variants, cognates ===
- English – Brandon (in some cases), Brendon
- Irish – Breandán, Breanndán
- Latin – Brendanus
- Old Irish – Brénainn

== Popularity and use ==
In some cases, the masculine given name Brennan may be used as a contracted form of Brendan, although it is etymologically unrelated. It is derived from the surname Brennan, an Anglicised form of the Irish Ó Braonáin. The popularity of (forms of) Brendan in Gaelic-speaking countries is thought to have influenced the use and popularity of the etymologically unrelated feminine name Brenda.

In 2008, (Note: Schwegel doesn't specifically give her sources or the precise dates for the info given in this part of the book. She states "Part 1, The Top Names, starts with lists of the 100 most popular first names for babies born recently in all of the United States and Canada and in particular regions of those countries".) the name was not in the top 100 given names for babies in the United States. However, it ranked within the top 100 given names for babies in New England with 2.60 occurrences per 1,000. During the decades spanning 1900–1940 the name wasn't among the top 1,000 given names recorded for babies in the United States. However, in the 1950s it ranked 679; in the 1960s 448; in the 1970s 293; in the 1980s 190; and in the 1990s 133. In recent years in the United States, the name has fallen in the ranking of names for babies. (Note: According to data from Social Security card applications for births that occurred in the United States.) In 2000 it ranked 101; in 2001 115; in 2002 124; in 2003 141; in 2004 149; in 2005 175; in 2006 185; in 2007 205; and in 2008 207.

== People named Brendan ==
- Saint Brendan of Clonfert (c. 484 – c. 577), Irish monastic saint
- Saint Brendan of Birr (died 573), Abbot of Birr in Co. Offaly, contemporaneous with the above
- Brendan Adams (born 2000), American basketball player in the Israeli Basketball Premier League
- Brendan Allen (born 1995), American mixed martial artist
- Brendan Behan (1923–1964), Irish writer
- Brendan Benson (born 1970), Detroit-area musician
- Brendan Bracken (1901–1958), Irish emigrant to Britain, businessman, magazine publisher, newspaper editor, politician and government minister
- Brendan Byrne (1924–2018), American Democratic Party politician from New Jersey
- Brendan Canty (born 1966), American musician
- Brendan Comiskey (1935–2025), Irish Roman Catholic bishop of the Diocese of Ferns
- Brendan Cowell (born 1976), Australian actor and screenwriter
- Brendan Coyle (born 1963), British actor
- Brendan Donnelly (born 1971), baseball player
- Brendan Evans (born 1986), American tennis player
- Brendan Eich (born 1961), American creator of the JavaScript programming language and co-founder of Mozilla
- Brendan Fevola (born 1981), Australian footballer
- Brendan Fraser (born 1968), Canadian-American actor
- Brendan Foster (born 1948), British long-distance runner
- Brendan Gallagher (born 1992), Canadian hockey player
- Brendan Garard (born 1971), Australian hockey player
- Brendan Gill (1914–1997) American journalist
- Brendan Gleeson (born 1955), Irish actor
- Brendan Grace (1951–2019), Irish comedian and singer
- Brendan Greene (born 1976), Irish video game developer
- Brendan Hansen (born 1981), American swimmer
- Brendan Harris (born 1980), American baseball player
- Brendan Haywood (born 1979), American basketball player
- Brendan Hines (born 1976), American actor and musician
- Brendan Horgan, American businessman
- Brendan Howlin (born 1956), Irish Labour Party politician
- Brendan Hughes (born 1948), Irish republican of the Provisional IRA
- Brendan Kilcoyne, Gaelic footballer
- Brendan Lane (basketball) (born 1990), American basketball player
- Brendan Langley (born 1994), American football player
- Brendan Leipsic (born 1994), Canadian hockey player
- Brendan McDyer, Gaelic footballer
- Angus Brendan MacNeil (born 1970) Scottish politician, MP for Na h-Eileanan an Iar
- Brendan Mahon (born 1995), American football player
- Brendan Malone (born 1942), American basketball coach
- Brendan McFarlane (1951–2025), Irish republican activist
- Brendan Moon (born 1958), Australia international rugby union player
- Brendan Morrison (born 1975), Canadian hockey player
- Brendan Murray (born 1996), Irish singer
- Brendan Murray (born 1995), American record producer known as Bighead
- Brendan Nelson (born 1958), Australian politician
- Brendan O'Neill (disambiguation), several people
- Brendan Rodgers (born 1973), Northern Irish football manager
- Brendan Ryan (disambiguation), several people
- Brendan Shanahan (born 1969), Canadian hockey player and executive
- Brendan Simbwaye (1934–1972?), Namibian anti-apartheid activist who disappeared in 1972
- Brendon Small (born 1975), American writer, creator of the TV shows Home Movies and Metalocalypse
- Brendan Smith (disambiguation), several people
- Brendan Smyth (1927–1997), Irish former Roman Catholic priest
- Brendan Summerhill (born 2003), American baseball player
- Brendan Walsh (chef) (born 1959), American chef
- Brendon Walsh (born 1978), American stand-up comedian
- Brendan White (born 1992), Australian association football player
- Brendan Whitecross (born 1990), Australian footballer

== Fictional characters named Brendan ==
- Brendan Filone, major character in the first season of The Sopranos
- Brendan Frye, lead character in the movie Brick
- Brendan Jones, from Australian television program A Country Practice
- Brendan (Pokémon), the main male character of Pokémon Ruby, Sapphire, Emerald, Omega Ruby and Alpha Sapphire
- Brendan Brady, from Channel 4 soap opera Hollyoaks
- Brendan, supporting character in the film The Darjeeling Limited
- Brendan Richards, from the short-lived Doctor Who spinoff K-9 and Company
- Brendan, the main character of the animated fantasy movie The Secret of Kells
- Brendan Conlon, one of the lead characters in the 2011 movie Warrior, played by Joel Edgerton

== People named Breandán ==
- Breandán Breathnach (1912–1985), Irish music collector and Uilleann piper
- Breandán de Gallaí (born 1969), Irish professional dancer
- Breandán Ó hEithir (1930–1990), Irish writer and broadcaster
- Breandán Ó Madagain (1932–2020), Irish scholar, writer and celticist

== See also ==
- List of Irish-language given names
