= Linda Sutter =

American comics writer and journalist (1941–1995)

Linda Sutter (1941–1995) was an American comics writer and journalist. She wrote the storyline for the comic strip Brenda Starr, Reporter from 1982 to 1985. A graduate of Vassar College, she was involved in television and radio journalism in the 1960s and 1970s. She produced a series for NBC Radio Network's Monitor program and worked for the WINS radio station and Channel 5 in New York City.

== Early life and education ==
Helen Linda Sutter was born in Greenwich, Connecticut, in 1941, to Suzanne Tenney and Clifford Samuel Sutter.

Sutter attended Vassar College where she was involved in the theater, appearing in productions of The Cherry Orchard and Arms and the Man. She graduated from Vassar in 1961.

== Career ==
Sutter began her career working for NBC as a network radio producer. With NBC Radio Network's Monitor program, she produced a series on "the younger generation" and interviewed Senator Edmund Muskie in 1968. During the 1970s, she was a television reporter for Metromedia Channel 5 in New York City and was a radio journalist with the WINS station.

=== Brenda Starr ===
In 1980, Sutter was hired by Chicago's Tribune Media Services to produce the Brenda Starr, Reporter comic strip. Starting in 1982, she wrote the storyline for the syndicated comic strip, taking over from the strip's creator, Dale Messick. Ramona Fradon continued to provide the artwork during Sutter's tenure. She started the process of updating the Brenda Starr character to a career woman from a fantasy figure. Her initial storylines led Brenda Starr to California where she is kidnapped by Arabs after meeting a mad scientist with a revolutionary silicon chip that is hidden in a golf ball. Sutter created a character lampooning ABC executive Roone Arledge. Her district attorney character "Diane Drab" was likened to then-Brooklyn DA Elizabeth Holtzman. Sutter continued producing and writing for Brenda Starr until 1985, when Mary Schmich took over the storyline.

== Personal and later life ==
Sutter married G. Raymond Empson in 1968. They had a son, Joshua C. Empson.

After she finished writing for Brenda Starr in the 1980s, Sutter studied at Harvard Divinity School, and planned to be ordained in the Episcopal Church. She died of brain cancer in Cambridge, Massachusetts, on December 18, 1995. She was 54.
