= Fradon =

Fradon is a surname. Notable people with the surname include:

- Dana Fradon (1922–2019), American cartoonist
- Ramona Fradon (1926–2024), American comics artist
