= Brenden =

Brenden is a given name and a surname. Notable people with the name include:

== Given name ==
- Brenden Aaronson (born 2000), American professional soccer player
- Brenden Abbott (born 1962), convicted Australian bank robber
- Brenden Bates (born 1999), American football player
- Brenden Bissett (born 1993), Canadian field hockey player
- Brenden Dillon (born 1990), Canadian ice hockey player
- Brenden Foster (1997–2008), American founder of the Brenden Foster Food Drive
- Brenden Fourie (born 1970), South African cricketer
- Brenden Hall, Australian Paralympic swimmer
- Brenden Jaimes (born 1999), American football player
- Brenden Jefferson (born 1986), American film and television actor and songwriter
- Brenden Jones (born 1974), American politician and entrepreneur
- John Brenden Kelly, Sr. (1889–1960), aka Jack Kelly, American triple Olympic champion
- Brenden Kelley, American politician
- Brenden Kichton (born 1992), Canadian ice hockey player
- Synnøve Brenden Klemetrud (born 1959), Norwegian politician
- Brenden Margieson aka Margo (born 1972), Australian professional surfer
- Brenden Morrow (born 1979), Canadian ice hockey player
- Brenden Pappas (born 1970), South African golfer
- Brenden Rice (born 2002), American football player
- Brenden Sander (born 1995), American volleyball player
- Brenden Santi (born 1993), Australian rugby league footballer who represented Italy
- Brenden Schooler (born 1997), American football player
- Brenden Shucart (aka Brenden Gregory), American HIV/AIDS and LGBT rights activist
- Brenden Stai (born 1972), American football player
- Brenden Thenhaus (born 1986), Canadian lacrosse player

== Surname ==
- Erik Næsbak Brenden (born 1994), Norwegian footballer
- Hallgeir Brenden (1929–2007), Norwegian cross-country skier
- John Brenden, Republican member of the Montana Legislature
- Kristian Brenden (born 1976), Norwegian ski jumper
- Laila Brenden (born 1956), Norwegian author
- Marie Brenden (1938–2012), Norwegian politician for the Labour Party

== See also ==
- Saint Brendan High School, co-educational private Roman Catholic high school in Florida
- Brendan (given name)
- Branden (disambiguation)
- Brandon (disambiguation)Brendon, Devon
- Brundon
- Brändön
