= Brendan Ryan =

Brendan Ryan may refer to:

- Brendan Ryan (Cork politician) (born 1946), Irish Independent (then Labour Party) Senator (1981–1993, 1997–2007)
- Brendan Ryan (baseball) (born 1982), U.S. major league baseball player
- Brendan Ryan (Dublin politician) (born 1953), Irish Labour Party Senator (2007–) from Dublin
- Brendan Ryan (footballer) (born 1964), former Australian rules footballer
- Brendan Ryan (poet) (born 1963), Australian poet
- J. Brendan Ryan, vice chairman of DraftFCB Worldwide
