= Brandon =

Brandon may refer to:

== Names and people ==
- Brandon (given name), a male given name
- Brandon (surname), a surname with several different origins

== Places ==
=== Australia ===
- Brandon, Queensland, a small town just south of Townsville

=== Canada ===
- Brandon, Manitoba

=== England ===
- Brandon, County Durham
- Brandon, Lincolnshire
- Brandon, Northumberland
- Brandon, Suffolk
  - Brandon Rural District, a former district of West Suffolk
- Brandon, Warwickshire
- Brandon Hill, Bristol

=== France ===
- Brandon, Saône-et-Loire
- Château de Brandon, at Saint-Pierre-de-Varennes (Saône-et-Loire)
- Tour du Brandon at Athée-sur-Cher in Indre-et-Loire

=== Ireland ===
- Brandon, County Kerry
- Mount Brandon, a mountain overlooking the village
- Brandon Bay, the bay overlooked by the village
- Brandon Creek, County Kerry
- Brandon Hill, a hill between Graiguenamana and Inistoige, Co. Kilkenny.

=== United States ===
- Brandon Corner, California
- Brandon, Colorado
- Brandon, Florida
- Brandon, Iowa
- Brandon Township, Michigan
- Brandon, Minnesota
- Brandon Township, Minnesota
- Brandon, Mississippi
- Brandon, Montana
- Brandon, Nebraska
- Brandon, New York
- Brandon, North Carolina
- Brandon, Ohio
- Brandon, South Dakota
- Brandon, Texas
- Brandon, Vermont
- Brandon (CDP), Vermont
- Brandon, Wisconsin
- Brandon Lake (Minnesota), a lake in Minnesota
- Lower Brandon Plantation (Prince George County, Virginia)
- Upper Brandon Plantation (Prince George County, Virginia)
- Brandon Plantation (Halifax County, Virginia)

== Other ==
- Ulmus americana 'Brandon', an elm cultivar
- Brandon Railroad, Nebraska, United States
- HMCS Brandon, several warships
- "Brandon", a song by Mötley Crüe from the album Generation Swine

== See also ==
- Brendon (disambiguation)
- Brandin, a given name and surname
- Let's Go Brandon
