= Brenda Starr, Reporter (film) =

1945 film by Wallace Fox

- Directed by: Wallace Fox
- Written by: Ande Lamb; Dale Messick; George H. Plympton
- Produced by: Sam Katzman
- Starring: Joan Woodbury; Kane Richmond
- Cinematography: Ira H. Morgan
- Edited by: Charles Henkel Jr.
- Music by: Edward J. Kay
- Production company: Sam Katzman Productions
- Distributed by: Columbia Pictures
- Release date: January 26, 1945
- Running time: 243 minutes (13 Chapters)
- Country: United States
- Language: English

Brenda Starr, Reporter (1945) was the 25th film serial released by Columbia Pictures. It was inspired by Brenda Starr, Reporter, a popular comic strip created by Dale Messick. The title role was played by Joan Woodbury, who had similar roles in feature films for Columbia and Monogram.

== Plot ==
Daily Flash newspaper journalist Brenda Starr (Joan Woodbury), and her photographer, Chuck Allen (Syd Saylor), are assigned to cover a fire in an old house, where they discover the wounded Joe Heller (Wheeler Oakman), a mobster suspected of stealing a quarter-million-dollar payroll. The dying Heller tells Brenda that someone took his satchel of stolen money and he gives her a coded message. Kruger (Jack Ingram), the gangster who shot Heller, escapes to his gang's hideout with the bag, but discovers it is filled with paper rather than money. The gang, knowing Heller gave Brenda a coded message, makes many attempts on her life to get her to reveal where Heller hid the payroll money, but thanks to Chuck and police lieutenant Larry Farrell (Kane Richmond), she evades them, until Pesky (Billy Benedict), a Daily Flash office boy, succeeds in decoding the Heller message.

== Cast ==
- Joan Woodbury as Brenda Starr
- Kane Richmond as Lt. Larry Farrell
- Syd Saylor as Chuck Allen
- Joe Devlin as Sgt. Tim Brown
- George Meeker as Frank Smith
- Wheeler Oakman as Joe Heller
- Anthony Warde as Muller
- Cay Forester as Vera Harvey
- Jack Ingram as Kruger
- Billy Benedict as Pesky
- Ernie Adams as Charlie
- Marion Burns as Zelda

== Production ==
In September 1944 Katzman signed a deal to make the film for Columbia release. At this time Katzman was making feature films for the "budget" Monogram Pictures studio, and with his typical thrift he produced Brenda Starr, Reporter on the side at Monogram, using that studio's sets, technicians, and some of its actors. Katzman had commissioned a newspaper-office set for Monogram's East Side Kids comedy Muggs Meets a Deadline (which began filming on June 5, 1944 and was ultimately released as Bowery Champs), and with the producer's typical thrift he retained the set (as well as actors Billy Benedict, Wheeler Oakman, and Frank Jaquet) for Brenda Starr, Reporter. Columbia's original plan was to make "at least two features based on the character", but Katzman received permission to use the property in a serial instead.

Joan Woodbury later recalled:

It was made during the war and everybody was hungry, including me. My former husband had gone off to war. I was left with a little daughter. So you grabbed anything you could grab and, believe me, you were very grateful for anything that came along. This was a 13-episode thing, in 21 days! The only reason they gave me the role was the fact I could learn dialogue fast enough to do everything in one take. The most memorable thing is, on the last night, the back of the set was one solid bar and there wasn’t an inch of space between one bottle and the next. Everybody was waiting for the wrap-up, so we could have a party! But I had 19 pages of dialogue on a telephone, with nobody talking back to me. It’s great if an actor talks back, you can at least ad lib on his ad libs. When you have nobody talking back, you’ve got nobody to ad lib you. So I’d look at a page and say, ‘Okay, let’s do it,’ pick up the phone and we’d shoot it. I shot all 19 sequences in one take, because they were going to kill me if I didn’t, with all that booze waiting; and I proceeded to get bombed after that. (laughs) Sam, at least, realized it was cheaper to hire a stuntlady than break my leg. So I didn’t fall out of windows, I didn’t have any fun at all. (laughs) I didn’t care to do any more serials.

== Release ==
=== Theatrical ===
The serial's theatrical release date was January 26, 1945.

=== Home media ===
Brenda Starr, Reporter is one of the last sound serials to be made available commercially. For many years, the serial was considered lost, with only a single known print in the hands of a private collector. The serial was released on DVD by VCI Entertainment in March 2011.

== Critical reception ==
Cline writes that Woodbury "managed to carry the story from one episode to another in fine style, leaving herself in jeopardy just enough to require [Richmond's] services as a rescuer each week... [she] salvaged by her beauty and charm what might have been Katzman's greatest fiasco except for Who's Guilty?"

Serial historian Daniel J. Neyer writes about the film:

Brenda Starr, Reporter spent over sixty years as a “lost” serial, not receiving a post-1945 public screening until it was shown at the fan event “Serial Fest” in 2006–and not coming out on commercial DVD until 2011. Because of its long unavailability and the understandable jubilation attendant upon its rediscovery, it hasn’t been as uniformly or as harshly criticized as other early Katzman Columbias like Who’s Guilty?, Son of the Guardsman, Hop Harrigan, and Chick Carter, Detective have been. However, it’s fully as listless as those disappointing efforts; though its cast is stronger overall than those of Guilty, Guardsman, or Harrigan, this strength is offset by Brenda’s more complete lack of action. Its closest relative is Chick Carter, with which (as we’ve seen) it shares many plotting similarities; like that chapterplay, it’s ultimately sunk by a thin, talky, uninteresting, and nearly action-free screenplay, despite a solid acting lineup of B-movie and serial veterans.

== Chapter titles ==
1. Hot News
2. The Blazing Trap
3. Taken for a Ride
4. A Ghost Walks
5. The Big Boss Speaks
6. Man Hunt
7. Hideout of Terror
8. Killer at Large
9. Dark Magic
10. A Double-Cross Backfires
11. On the Spot
12. Murder at Night
13. The Mystery of the Payroll

== See also ==
- List of American films of 1945
- List of film serials by year
- List of film serials by studio

Preceded by Black Arrow (1944)	Columbia Serial; Brenda Starr, Reporter (1945)	Succeeded by The Monster and the Ape (1945)
