= Branden =

Branden may refer to:

- Branden (given name)
- Branden (surname)

== See also ==
- Brandon (disambiguation)
