= Dale Messick =

American cartoonist (1906–2005)

- Messick, shown working on Brenda Starr, Reporter in 1953.
- Born: Dalia Messick; April 11, 1906 South Bend, Indiana, US
- Died: April 5, 2005 (aged 98) Sonoma County, California, US
- Areas: Cartoonist, Writer, Artist
- Notable works: Brenda Starr, Reporter
- Awards: National Cartoonists Society's Story Comic Book Award, 1975; Milton Caniff Lifetime Achievement Award, 1997; Will Eisner Award Hall of Fame, 2001

Dalia Messick (April 11, 1906 – April 5, 2005) was an American comic strip artist who used the pseudonym Dale Messick. She was the creator of Brenda Starr, Reporter, which at its peak during the 1950s ran in 250 newspapers.

== Early life ==
Messick was born in South Bend, Indiana, on April 11, 1906. Her father, Cephas Messick, was a sign painter and vocational arts teacher. Her mother Bertha was a milliner and seamstress; her work inspired some of the glamorous hats used in the Brenda Starr strip. After her family moved to Hobart, Indiana, Messick, who repeated third and eighth grades, attended Hobart High School, earning her diploma at age 20. She studied for one summer at the Ray Commercial Art School in Chicago, but left to begin a career as a professional artist.

== Greeting cards ==
Messick began working for a Chicago greeting card company and was successful but quit when her boss lowered her pay during the Great Depression. In 1933, she moved to New York City where she found work with another greeting card company at a higher salary, $50 a week, sending nearly half of it back to her family in Indiana. She recalled, "I had $30 a week to live it up. You could walk down 42nd Street and have bacon and eggs and toast and coffee and hash brown potatoes and orange juice—the works—for 25 cents."

== Comic strips ==
She began assembling a portfolio of comic strip samples. Messick was not the first female comic strip creator; Nell Brinkley, Gladys Parker and Edwina Dumm had all achieved success in the field, but there was still a bias against women. Messick decided to change her first name to the androgynous "Dale" so her work would be seen by editors. She created a variety of comic strips (Weegee, Mimi the Mermaid, Peg and Pudy, the Struglettes, Streamline Babies), but none was selected for publication.

== Brenda Starr, Reporter ==
Messick created the character of Brenda Starr in 1940, naming it after 1930s debutante Brenda Frazier, and basing her appearance on Rita Hayworth. Messick wanted to produce a strip with a female protagonist; she decided a career as a reporter would allow her character to travel and have adventures, albeit adventures more glamorous than those actually experienced by most reporters. She said in a 1986 article in the San Francisco Chronicle, "I used to get letters from girl reporters saying that their lives were nowhere near as exciting as Brenda's. I told them that if I made Brenda's life like theirs, nobody would read it."

Her break came when she came to the attention of another woman, Mollie Slott, who worked as a "girl Friday" for New York Daily News publisher (and syndicate head) Joseph Medill Patterson. Patterson, reputedly biased against female cartoonists, would not sign her up for daily publication in the News, but he accepted Brenda Starr, Reporter for syndication as a Sunday comic, and it made its debut on June 30, 1940. The strip was an immediate success, since the mix of adventure and romance was popular with both male and female readers, and a daily strip was added in October of the same year. By 1945, the strip was syndicated nationally and published daily. She had art assistants over the years, notably including Mike Grell, who worked with her in 1972 before beginning his career in comic books.

Messick stopped drawing the strip in 1980 and ended her role writing the script two years later. Ramona Fradon (artist) and Linda Sutter (writer) took over production of the strip. Mary Schmich, herself a Pulitzer-prize-winning "girl reporter", took over as writer in 1985, and June Brigman as artist in 1995. The final strip was published on January 2, 2011. Messick was not impressed with her successors' versions of Starr, according to a 1998 quote in the Sonoma County Independent: "Now it doesn't look like Brenda at all. She looks more like she works at a bank. No glamour, no curves, no fashion — but it's still going pretty good.".

== Other endeavors ==
Messick worked on other comic strips, but none achieved the success of Brenda Starr, Reporter. The only other strip which she worked on which is generally remembered was Perry Mason, which she illustrated.

On April 24, 1955, Messick appeared on What's My Line? After Dorothy Kilgallen correctly identified her as a comic strip artist, the panel was given a full description of her real name, professional name and job as "illustrator" of Brenda Starr, Reporter.

On May 5, 1960, Messick appeared as a contestant on To Tell the Truth. None of the panelists correctly identified her.

== Accolades ==
In 1995, Brenda Starr, Reporter was one of 20 comic strips honored by a series of United States postage stamps; Messick was the only living creator. She received the National Cartoonists Society's Story Comic Book Award for 1975 and their Milton Caniff Lifetime Achievement Award in 1997 for her work on Brenda Starr, Reporter. Messick was inducted into the Friends of Lulu Women Cartoonists Hall of Fame in 1998. She was inducted into the Will Eisner Award Hall of Fame in 2001; she and Marie Severin were the first women to be so inducted.

== Personal life ==
Messick was married twice. With first husband, Everette George Soltmann, whom she married in 1940, she had one child, a daughter named Starr. Messick married Indiana attorney Oscar Strom in 1952. Both marriages ended in divorce.

She had two grandchildren, Curt and Laura Rohrman. Laura has written a theatrical play about her grandmother's life, entitled Reporter Girl.

Following her retirement from Brenda Starr, Reporter, Messick moved to Oakmont, California, to be near her daughter and grandchildren. She continued to work, creating a strip, Granny Glamour, which ran in Oakmont Gardens Magazine, a local weekly magazine. It ended after she had a stroke in 1998 and could no longer draw. At the time of her death, she was being cared for by her daughter in Penngrove, Sonoma County, California.

Messick died on April 5, 2005, aged 98, in Sonoma County, California.
