= Ulmus americana 'Patmore' =

Elm cultivar

- Species: Ulmus americana
- Cultivar: 'Patmore'
- Origin: Brandon, Manitoba, Canada

The American elm cultivar Ulmus americana 'Patmore' was selected and raised by R. H. Patmore from a native tree in Brandon, Manitoba, Canada. It may be synonymous with another cultivar from the same source, known as 'Brandon'.

== Description ==
'Patmore' (or 'Brandon') differs from most American elms in possessing a pyramidal, as opposed to vase, form.

== Pests and diseases ==
No other specific information available, but the species generally is highly susceptible to Dutch elm disease and elm yellows; it is also moderately preferred for feeding and reproduction by the adult elm leaf beetle Xanthogaleruca luteola, and highly preferred for feeding by the Japanese beetle Popillia japonica in the United States. U. americana is also the most susceptible of all the elms to verticillium wilt.

== Cultivation ==
The tree is not known to have been cultivated beyond North America.

== Synonymy ==
- 'Patmore Ascending', as 'grafted elm', Patmore Nursery Sales, Brandon, Cats. 1945 & 1955.
- 'Patmore Ascending Elm', Patmore Nursery Sales, Brandon, Cat. 1973.
- 'Exhibition Boulevard Elm', as 'grafted elm', Cat. 1958, and as 'grafted ascending elm' (1966).

== Accessions ==
=== North America ===
- Dominion Arboretum, Canada, No details available.
