= Brendon =

Brendon may refer to:

== People ==
- Brendon (singer), a former British pop/glam rock singer born Brendon Dunning
- Brendon Ayanbadejo, an American football linebacker
- Brendon Hartley, a New Zealand racecar driver
- Brendon McCullum, a New Zealand cricketer
- Brendon Šantalab, Australian footballer
- Brendon Small, an American stand-up comedian, actor, composer, and musician
- Brendon Urie, American musician known as the sole remaining member of Panic! at the Disco
- Brendon (footballer, born 1992), Brendon Eric de Souza Silva, Brazilian football midfielder
- Brendon (footballer, born 1995), Brendon Lucas da Silva Estevam, Brazilian football centre-back for Ho Chi Minh City
- Brendon (footballer, born 2002), Brendon Valença Sobral, Brazilian football midfielder for Resende

== Places ==
- Brendon, Devon, a village in North Devon district, Devon, England
- Brendon, Sutcombe, a location in Torridge, Devon, England
- Brendon, Thornbury, a location in Torridge, Devon, England
- Brendon Hills, a range in Somerset, England

== See also ==
- Bendon (disambiguation)
- Brandon (disambiguation)
