= Bendon (disambiguation) =

Bendon may refer to:

- Bendon, Michigan
- Bendon Group
- Bendon Publishing International

== People with the surname Bendon ==
- Dan Bendon (born 1989), English cricketer
- James Bendon (born 1937), British philatelist

== See also ==
- Brendon (disambiguation)
