= Brendan O'Neill =

Brendan O'Neill may refer to:

- Brendan O'Neill (businessman) (born 1948), British business executive
- Brendan O'Neill (columnist), British columnist
- Brendan O'Neill (musician) (born 1951, Belfast), Irish musician, drummer of the late Rory Gallagher band and now Nine Below Zero
