= Mollie Slott =

- Born: April 19, 1893
- Died: January 24, 1967 (aged 73)
- Education: Academy of Fine Arts
- Occupations: Journalist; vice president and director
- Notable credit: First female manager in the Chicago-Tribune New York Daily News syndicate history
- Spouse: Charles Levinson
- Children: Two sons
- Parent(s): Lee and Sarah (Herlinger) Slott

Mollie Slott (April 19, 1893 – January 24, 1967) was an American journalist, who became one of the nation's best known figures in the newspaper syndicate industry. In 1946, Slott was chosen as Chicago-Tribune New York Daily news syndicate manager, becoming the first female manager in the syndicate history; In 1955, she was promoted to syndicate vice president, and in 1961, she was promoted to director.

In 1921, Slott sent two pictures, by telegraph, using the principle of latitude and longitudinal coordinates, of the Dempsy-Carpentier fight, something that others insisted couldn't be done. In 1940, Slott discovered female comic strip pioneer Dale Messick while working as an assistant to New York Daily News publisher Joseph Medill Patterson.

During her 56-year career she was recognized for her business and organizational skills while working under a number of Tribune managers and editors, and many of them had offered her better pay, if she agreed to leave and follow them to their new jobs.

Slott was a member of the National Women's Press Club, the New York Newspaper Women's Club, and the Overseas Press Club.

== Biography ==
Mollie Slott was born to parents Lee and Sarah (Herlinger) Slott, in Chicago, Illinois. She attended the Academy of Fine Arts, in Chicago, for two years. Deciding to go to work, rather than stay in school, Slott, concealing her age, (17) began working for the Chicago Tribune, in 1910 as a stenographer in the circulation department.

She married Charles Levinson, an insurance executive, on May 29, 1917. They later had two sons, William Author, and Lee. William attended Columbia University, and was the sports editor for the school newspaper, The Spectator. He also contributed to several newspaper, writing short stories and articles. He eventually became a magazine editor; Slott would later say she was pleased that he chose to follow in her footsteps. Lee, became an executive in Philadelphia. She was a dedicated worker, who only took a leave of absence, twice, when she had her children. It had been reported that she worked up to the day before she gave birth to her second son, Lee.

In 1921, it was reported that "a little newspaper woman, who is assistant manager of the Chicago Tribune Syndicate," (Slott) sent pictures of the Dempsy-Carpentier fight at Boyle's Thirty Acres, by telegraph. Slott sent two pictures from the New York News, by tracing the images onto grided paper and using the principal of latitude and longitude coordinates, and sending notes explaining details that lines didn't show, she successfully sent the pictures. The article described how '"Miss Slott telegraphed the picture taken just after the blow that sent Carpentier back to France, a beaten fighter."' The second picture was of his final collapse.

In 1933, Joseph Medill Patterson, founder and publisher of the organization, moved the syndicate office from Chicago to New York. Slott was charged with coordinating the move, and she did so without missing a deadline.

In 1940, Patterson, at Slott's urging, agreed to experiment with female comic strip pioneer Dalia "Dale" Messick's Brenda Starr, by allowing it to be published in the supplementary issue of the Tribune. Slott had removed the comic strip from the trash, and convinced Messick to change Starr's occupation from bandit to reporter, and to use the pen name Dale instead of Dalia, working around an era when women were not included in all professions. Messick drew the cartoon for 43 years.

in 1946, Slott was chosen as Chicago Tribune-New York news syndicate manager, becoming the first female manager in the syndicate history. In 1955, she was promoted to syndicate vice president, after her boss, Patterson, retired. In 1961, she was named as director.
