= Brenda Starr, Reporter =

1940–2011 American comic strip

- Authors: Dale Messick (1940–1980); Dale Messick and Ramona Fradon (1980–1982); Ramona Fradon and Linda Sutter (1982–1985); Ramona Fradon and Mary Schmich (1985–1995); Mary Schmich and June Brigman (1995–2011)
- Launch date: June 30, 1940
- End date: January 2, 2011
- Syndicate(s): Chicago Tribune New York News Syndicate
- Publisher(s): Four Star Publications; Superior Publishing; Charlton Comics; Dell Publishing; Hermes Press
- Genre(s): Romance, adventure

Brenda Starr, Reporter (often referred to simply as Brenda Starr) is a comic strip about a glamorous, adventurous reporter. It was created in 1940 by Dale Messick for the Chicago Tribune Syndicate, and continued by others until 2011.

== History ==
Although set in Chicago, Brenda Starr, Reporter initially was the only Chicago Tribune Syndicate strip not to appear in the Chicago Tribune newspaper. When the strip debuted on June 30, 1940, it was relegated to a comic book supplement that was included with the Sunday Chicago Tribune. Soon the strip appeared in the Sunday paper and a daily strip was added starting October 22, 1945. During the 1950s, at the height of its popularity, the strip appeared in 250 newspapers. In 2010, the strip appeared in 65 newspapers, 36 of them international.

=== Beginnings ===
Dale Messick had ambitions to create a comic strip from her early days; she submitted her first strip, Weegee, in the mid-1920s, when she was just out of high school. After studying at The Art Institute of Chicago, she got a job designing greeting cards. During the 1930s, Messick submitted three more comic strips—Peg and Pudy and Streamline Babies were about "Depression-era heroines born ahead of their time, working girls come to the big city to earn their living", while Mimi the Mermaid explored a fantasy theme. Feeling that editors were prejudiced against female cartoonists, Dalia signed these strips with a more ambiguous first name, "Dale". Still, these strips were each rejected.

In 1940, Messick created a new heroine—a "girl bandit" named Brenda Starr—whose looks were modeled on the film star Rita Hayworth, and named after a popular debutante, Brenda Frazier. She submitted the new strip to the Chicago Tribune-New York News syndicate, but the syndicate chief, Joseph Medill Patterson, "had tried a woman cartoonist once... and wanted no more of them." Patterson's assistant, Mollie Slott—later the vice president of the syndicate—saw the discarded samples, and encouraged Messick to make Brenda a reporter. Patterson accepted the strip, but ran it in the Chicago Tribune's Sunday comic book supplement, rather than the daily paper. He refused to run it in his other paper, the New York Daily News, which finally carried Brenda Starr in 1948, two years after Patterson's death. After the strip was established, other instances of resistance were reported. "Whenever Ms. Messick drew in cleavage or a navel, the syndicate would erase it. She was once banned in Boston after showing Brenda smoking a polka dot cigar."

=== Later production teams ===
Following Messick's retirement as Brenda Starr's artist in 1980, the strip was continued by different female writer and illustrator teams. From 1980 through 1982, Messick continued scripting, and the strip was illustrated by Ramona Fradon. In 1982, Linda Sutter took over writing. Mary Schmich began scripting the strip in 1985, with Fradon continuing as the illustrator until her 1995 retirement. From 1995 onward, June Brigman illustrated Schmich's scripts.

=== End ===
The final strip was published on January 2, 2011. According to Mary Schmich, the strip ended because she and June Brigman had both "decided to move on," and publishing and distributing the strip was no longer profitable for the Chicago Tribune. "Besides, in real-time, Brenda is close to 100 years old."

=== Characters ===

Brenda has always been a modern woman, noted for her exotic adventures and steamy romances. Dale Messick and later artists concentrated on keeping Brenda contemporary in clothing and hairstyles. Comics historians Steve Duin and Mike Richardson stated that "Dale Messick kept readers enthralled for years over the romance between Brenda Starr and her Mystery Man". Before Messick retired, Brenda finally married the mysterious Basil St. John, her "Mystery Man", whose eye patch and black orchid serum have been a regular plot element. Shortly thereafter, Brenda had a baby girl named Starr Twinkle St. John. Brenda and Basil divorced, and sparks flew when they met again. During one of Basil's reappearances, Brenda discovered Basil had a son named Sage with the talk show host Wanda Fonda. That marriage also ended in divorce. Brenda and Wanda became good friends. Eventually, Brenda was promoted from reporter to editor. Brenda was the daughter of actress Beth Bennet (or Bennett) and her husband Jack Starr. Her mother died under mysterious circumstances and Brenda's grief-stricken father sent her to boarding school.

Other regular characters include:

- Muggs Walters, the original editor of The Flash and Brenda's boss, starting with the first strip.
- Pesky Miller, wisecracking cub reporter. Pesky appeared in the first Brenda Starr strip in June 1940, and continued for decades. He rarely takes an active role in the story; his main role is to be a voice in the newsroom that admires Brenda.
- Tom Taylor, reporter and Brenda's original love interest. He appeared in the first strip in June 1940, saying, "Now, listen, Brenda. Call it off and for the millionth time will ya marry me?" He continued in that vein, unsuccessfully, for five years, until he fell for copy girl Slim Nolan and married her in January 1946.
- Daphne Dimples, Walters' niece and an early rival of Brenda's. She first appeared in late 1940, trying to take Brenda's job.
- Abretha Breeze, Brenda's stout cousin from Indiana. She arrived for a visit with her dog Tornado in August 1941, and stayed until June 1948, when she married Hyram "Hi" Pockets, and went to live on his farm.
- Hank O'Hair, female city editor with a notably androgynous look. O'Hair was modeled after reporter Pat O'Haire, who worked as a copy girl at the New York Daily News in the early 1940s. Hank was introduced in the strip in the fall of 1942, and remained a regular character through the end of the strip in 2011.
- Atwell Livwright, managing editor of The Flash. He took over the paper in 1948.
- Gabby Van Slander, gossip columnist and catty rival of Brenda. Gabby was introduced by writer Mary Schmich in her first week of writing the strip, in September 1985, and remained a regular character through the end.
- Mikhail Goodenuf, handsome, blonde and muscular Soviet ballet dancer who defected to the United States and became a secret agent. He met Brenda in January 1986, while he was investigating a Russian plot to sell an addictive, deadly drug to Americans as an energy supplement. Mikhail and Brenda began a romantic entanglement that lasted several years, and crossed over with Basil's storyline.

=== Credits ===
- Dale Messick (story and art): June 30, 1940 – October 5, 1980
- Dale Messick (story) and Ramona Fradon (art): October 6, 1980 – November 14, 1982
- Linda Sutter (story) and Ramona Fradon (art): November 15, 1982 – September 21, 1985
- Mary Schmich (story) and Ramona Fradon (art): September 22, 1985 – November 5, 1995
- Mary Schmich (story) and June Brigman (art): November 6, 1995 – January 2, 2011

== Final storylines ==
=== 2009: Romance in Paris ===
However, Basil's mysterious assistant, a handsome Kazooki code-named "Ringo," persuaded Sage and Brenda to travel instead to Paris, France. Sage was thrilled by the idea of traveling by an undersea tunnel. Brenda admitted that she "could never say no to Paris." In the French capital, Ringo revealed two secrets to Brenda: 1) Basil was financing and training teachers to educate the Kazooki people (which would put Basil on a death list if found out by the repressive government of Kazookistan); and 2) Ringo was in love with Brenda. When he says the latter, Brenda either does not hear him—or pretends not to. But the second time, she clearly hears him—and feels as if she is drowning. She recovers, and says: "Thanks for the gift." Then the two continue exploring Paris and explaining their feelings to each other. They drink an entire bottle of champagne and Ringo recites mystic Sufi love poetry to Brenda. When the bottle is empty, Ringo places a love poem by Hafez inside it, and casts it into the Seine, calculating that one day it will reach American shores. They bid a sad bittersweet farewell. Ringo returns to Kazookistan. Brenda returns Sage to his mother Wanda in the US.

=== 2009: Move to India ===
Dale Messick's Brenda Starr, Reporter (May 2, 1948)

Bottomline, Brenda's boss, orders her to take a furlough—an unpaid leave. Starr instead accepts a job offer from her old friend Pug—who is now working for a newspaper in India. Brenda and Pug very early have a major disagreement, concerning a street child. Brenda is ready to adopt the hungry little girl, but Pug warns her against falling for the wiles of the "slumpuppies". Starr also finds herself instantly attracted to a dark and handsome fellow reporter, Salman Mistry. Salman shows some hostility towards Brenda, mostly because she is an American. The street urchin, named Carina, turns out to actually be the rich heiress of the wealthy Khan family. The other members of the family—Taj, Raj, Caressa—are suspects in a major and complex conspiracy, including the assassination of journalists and a plot for brutal slum clearance.

=== 2010: Family corruption ===
Back in the US, Brenda is shocked to discover that The Flash has become a free newspaper and has taken on a blogger, the callow Jason. She is disappointed too when her old friend Harry Rumples seems to have sold out to the politicians. When the new mayor, charismatic Sterling Golden, is implicated in a murder, Brenda flies off to Belize in Central America, in search of the missing green campaigner Verde. Golden's manipulative mother turns out to be behind the murder and other dark doings. Brenda next investigates eccentric district attorney Tap Fitzpatrick in relation to the death of her fellow reporter Felicity Fox, and discovers that Tap's father is plotting against him while faking senility.

At the newspaper holiday party, Brenda announces her retirement. In the final strip (published Sunday, January 2, 2011), she says good-bye to everyone and walks away with tears in her eyes. As she leaves the party, she receives a box containing a black orchid, and a card with the initials BSJ.

== Other media ==
=== Comic books ===
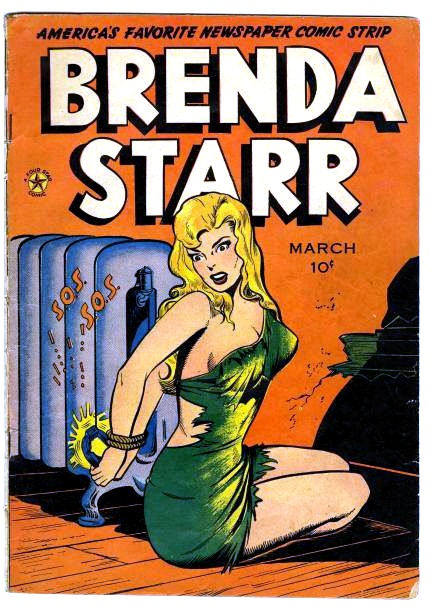
Brenda Starr #14, Superior Publishing, 1948, art by Jack Kamen

Brenda Starr, Reporter was published as a comic book series by four different publishing houses. The first was Four Star Publications in 1947, followed by Superior Publishing from 1948 through 1949. In 1955 Charlton Comics carried the series, as well as Dell Publishing in 1963. Among the several comic book runs the 1948 Superior series featured art by Jack Kamen in issues #2, #4 and #14. Brenda Starr is currently being reprinted by Hermes Press.

=== Films and TV ===
Through the years there have been four film and television movies based on the comic strip. The first was Brenda Starr, Reporter, a 1945 serial with Joan Woodbury in the title role. A Brenda Starr movie, produced for television, that starred Jill St. John in the lead role was released in 1976. An unsold television pilot movie starring Sherry Jackson was produced in 1979. The last film produced to date was Brenda Starr with Brooke Shields and Timothy Dalton. Although produced in 1986, the movie was not released in the United States until 1992 due to lengthy litigation over distribution rights. The movie was panned by critics and is considered to be a notorious critical and commercial failure. In 2006, Tribune Media Services and actress Jenna Mattison were looking for producers to create a TV movie or series based on Brenda Starr.

=== Merchandising and tie-ins ===
- In 1964, the Madame Alexander Doll Company introduced a Barbie-like fashion doll named after and depicting Brenda Starr. The doll was a commercial failure and for 1965 Madame Alexander chose to no longer pay the royalties to use the Brenda Starr name. The same doll was renamed Yolanda for 1965 and failed again, and by 1966 the doll was discontinued.
- Brenda Starr, Reporter was one of 20 comic strips honored as Comic Strip Classics in a special release of commemorative postage stamps in 1995.
- In 2003, the Effanbee Doll Company introduced a 16" Brenda Starr collectible fashion doll, with glamorous 1940s fashions inspired by the comic strip. The collection was extended in 2004 to include a doll of Brenda's apprentice Daphne Dimples and in 2005 a Basil St. John doll debuted with an extensive wardrobe. By 2007, the Brenda Starr line had been retired.
- In 2006, the Society of Professional Journalists sold posters and other merchandise with Brenda Starr proclaiming, "Freedom of the press means freedom for everyone."

=== In popular culture ===
- The character was name-checked by the rock group Blondie on their single "Rip Her to Shreds".

== Bibliography ==
- Strickler, Dave. Syndicated Comic Strips and Artists, 1924–1995: The Complete Index. Cambria, California: Comics Access, 1995. ISBN 0970007701
