= Brenda Tuosto =

Swiss politician (born 1989)

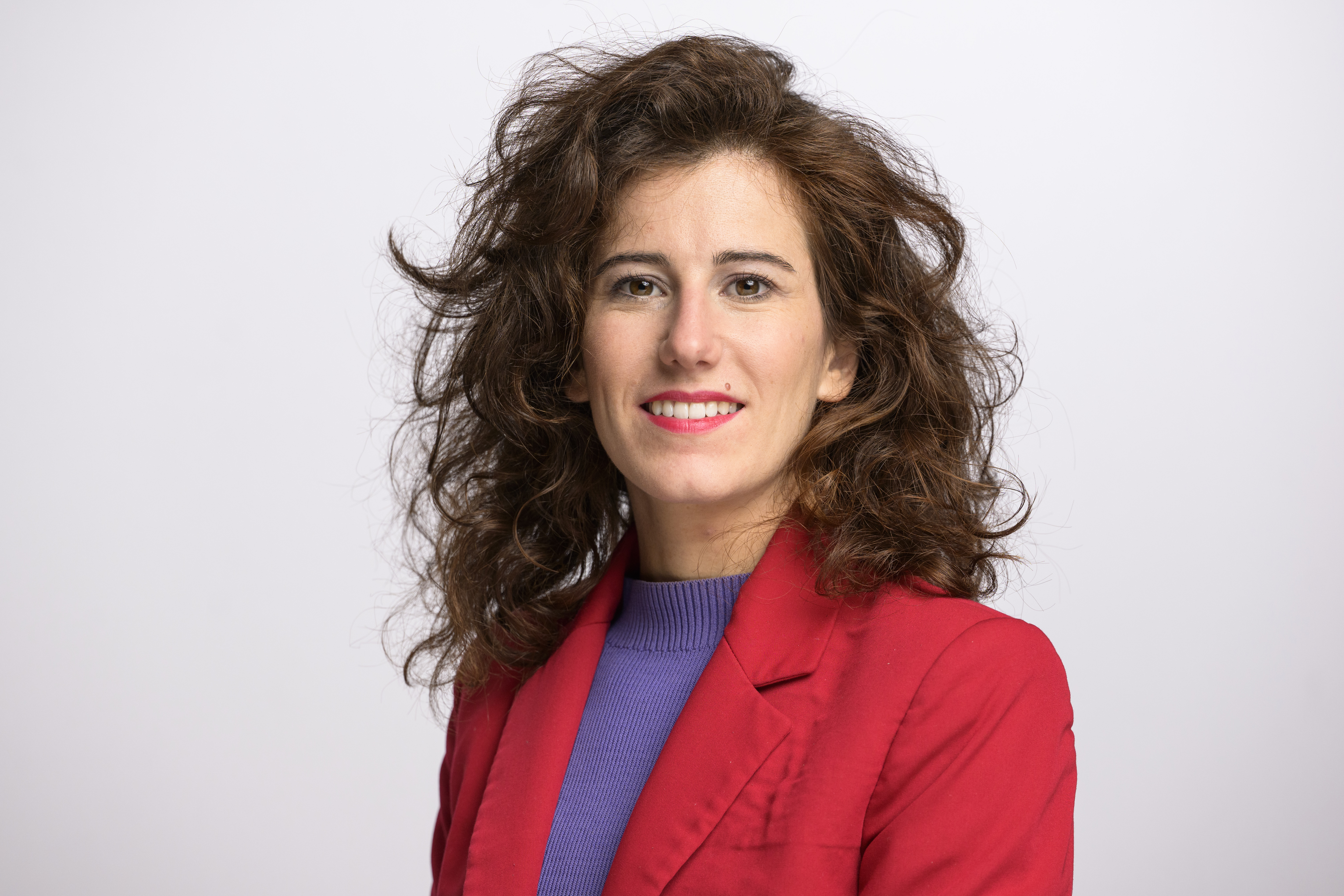
- Brenda Tuosto in 2023

Member of the National Council of Switzerland
- Incumbent
- Assumed office 2023

Personal details
- Born: 6 January 1989 (age 37)
- Party: Social Democratic Party of Switzerland
- Education: University of Lausanne

Brenda Tuosto (born 6 January 1989) is a Swiss politician from the Social Democratic Party and urban planner. She has been a member of the National Council since 2023.

== Early life ==
Brenda Tuosto was born in January 1989. She grew up in Les Tuileries-de-Grandson, a village near Grandson.

Tuosto studied geography at the University of Lausanne and has a master's degree in urban planning.

Until her election to the Municipality (Exekutive) of Yverdon-les-Bains in 2021, she worked for the city of Biel as co-responsible for the transport sector, having previously been involved with the Yverdon bypass project.

== Political career ==
She was a member of the Young Greens before joining the Social Democratic Party.

She served on the Grandson Municipal Council (legislative) from 2016 to 2021.

In March 2021, she was elected to the Yverdon municipal council (executive) in the first round of voting with 52.3% of the vote, making her the third-strongest candidate. There, she is responsible for the building department and the environment and mobility department.

In the 2023 Swiss federal election, she secured the first substitute position for her party. With the election of Pierre-Yves Maillard to the Council of States in the same elections, she immediately moved up to the National Council.

== See also ==
- List of members of the National Council of Switzerland, 2023–2027
