= Dana Fradon =

American cartoonist (1922–2019)

- Born: April 14, 1922; Chicago, Illinois, U.S.
- Died: October 3, 2019 (aged 97); Woodstock, New York, U.S.
- Education: Art Students League of New York
- Occupation: Cartoonist
- Spouse: Ramona Fradon (m. 1948; div. 1982)

Arthur Dana Fradon (April 14, 1922 – October 3, 2019) was an American cartoonist. He drew roughly 1,400 cartoons for The New Yorker from 1948 to 1992, and from 1998 to 2003. He also authored several books. Fradon was born in Chicago, Illinois. He served in the United States Army Air Forces during World War II.

== Selected works ==
- Fradon, Dana (1961). Breaking the Laugh Barrier: An Original Cartoon Book. New York: Dell. ISBN 9780684155784. OCLC 11340236.
- Fradon, Dana (1978). Insincerely Yours: Cartoons. New York: Scribner. ISBN 9780684155784. OCLC 3770785.
