= Mary Schmich =

American journalist (born 1953)

- Born: November 29, 1953 (age 72); Savannah, Georgia, U.S.
- Education: Pomona College (BA)

Mary Theresa Schmich (/ʃmiːk/ SHMEEK; born November 29, 1953) is an American journalist. She was a columnist for the Chicago Tribune from 1992 to 2021, winning the Pulitzer Prize in 2012. Her columns were syndicated nationally by Tribune Content Agency. She wrote the comic strip Brenda Starr, Reporter for the last 28 of its 60 years and she wrote the 1997 column Wear Sunscreen. The line "Do one thing every day that scares you" from the column has frequently been misattributed to Eleanor Roosevelt.

== Biography ==
Born in Savannah, Georgia, the oldest of eight children, Schmich spent her childhood in Georgia. She attended high school in Phoenix, Arizona, and earned a B.A. from Pomona College.

After working in college admissions for three years and spending a year and a half in France, Schmich attended journalism school at Stanford. She has worked as a reporter at the Palo Alto Peninsula Times Tribune, the Orlando Sentinel and since 1985 at the Tribune, where she was a national correspondent based in Atlanta for five years. Her column started in 1992 and was interrupted for a year when she attended Harvard on a Nieman Fellowship for journalists.

From 1985 Schmich was the writer of Brenda Starr, Reporter until its final appearance in January 2011. The long-lived comic strip, set in Chicago, was created by Dale Messick for the Chicago Tribune Syndicate in 1940. Messick continued to the early 1980s; Schmich was the third and final writer, working with the second and third artists.

She has also worked as a professional barrelhouse and ragtime piano player.

About four times a year for some years, Schmich and fellow Tribune metro columnist Eric Zorn wrote a week of columns that consisted of a back-and-forth exchange of letters. Each December since 1999, Schmich and Zorn have hosted the "Songs of Good Cheer" holiday caroling parties at the Old Town School of Folk Music to raise money for the Tribune Holiday Fund charities. On December 18, 2020, because of the COVID-19 pandemic, Schmich and Zorn held a virtual streaming event that was livecast over YouTube.

Schmich won the annual Pulitzer Prize for Commentary, recognizing 2011 work with the Tribune, citing "her wide range of down-to-earth columns that reflect the character and capture the culture of her famed city."

In June 2021, Schmich was one of four Tribune columnists who took a buyout from the newspaper following its acquisition by Alden Global Capital.

Beginning in 2025, Schmich hosted the limited-series podcast "Division Street Revisited," which followed the stories of seven people that had been previously profiled in "Division Street: America," a 1967 oral history written by Studs Terkel. She also wrote the foreword to a new edition of "Division Street."

As of Spring 2026, Schmich is a visiting professor at the University of Notre Dame, where she teaches the course "Big Picture, Narrow Focus: Profiles that Illuminate the World."

== 'Wear Sunscreen' ==
Schmich's June 1, 1997, column began with the injunction to wear sunscreen, and continued with discursive advice for living without regret. In her introduction to the column, she described it as the commencement address she would give if she were asked to give one. The column was circulated around the Internet, with an erroneous claim that it was a commencement address by Kurt Vonnegut, usually at the Massachusetts Institute of Technology, and the misattribution became a news item when Vonnegut was contacted by reporters to comment. He told The New York Times, "What she wrote was funny, wise and charming, so I would have been proud had the words been mine."

In 1998, Schmich published the column as a book, Wear Sunscreen. In 1999, Baz Luhrmann released a song called "Everybody's Free (To Wear Sunscreen)" in which this column is read word for word as written by Schmich, who gave permission and receives royalties. This song was a number one hit in several countries.

Schmich's June 1, 1997, column (as well as the Baz Luhrmann song based on it) includes the sentence "Do one thing every day that scares you." The statement was Schmich's original work, but has frequently been misattributed to Eleanor Roosevelt.

== Works ==
- Wear Sunscreen (Andrews McMeel Publishing, 1998) ISBN 978-0-8362-5528-7. 54 pages
- Even the Terrible Things Seem Beautiful to Me Now: the best of Mary Schmich (Chicago: Midway, 2013) ISBN 978-1-57284-145-1. – 415-page collection of "ten Pulitzer-winning columns along with 154 others"

== See also ==
- List of newspaper columnists
