= June Brigman =

American comic book artist and illustrator

- Born: October 25, 1960 (age 66) Atlanta, Georgia, U.S.
- Areas: Cartoonist, Penciller
- Notable works: Power Pack; Brenda Starr, Reporter
- Awards: Inkpot Award (2014)

June Brigman (born October 25, 1960) is an American comic book artist and illustrator. She is best known for creating the preteen superhero characters Power Pack with writer Louise Simonson in 1984. Brigman was the artist of the syndicated newspaper strip Brenda Starr, Reporter from 1995 to 2011 and in 2016 became the artist for the newspaper strip Mary Worth.

== Early life ==
June Brigman grew up in Atlanta. Her artistic influences included Stan Drake, Gil Kane, and Walt Simonson. She attended Georgia State University and the University of Georgia, studying art.

== Career ==
Brigman entered the comics industry with AC Comics in 1983. A sample Astron story (eventually published by AC in 1986) earned her a job with DC Comics in 1984. At Marvel Comics, she co-created Power Pack, a series she penciled on and off until issue #17. For the next seven years, Brigman worked exclusively for Marvel, mostly on short runs as well as contributing illustrations to various editions of The Official Handbook of the Marvel Universe. She and writer Jim Salicrup created a promotional comic book for Cheap Trick's Busted album in 1990.

Brigman pencilled DC's Supergirl mini-series in 1994, following that with 1995's Dark Horse Comics' Star Wars mini-series River of Chaos, which was written by her former Power Pack collaborator Louise Simonson.

In 1995, Brigman became the artist of the syndicated newspaper comic strip Brenda Starr, Reporter and drew it until the strip ended in 2011. She has illustrated and colored the Where in the World is Carmen Sandiego? comic strip for National Geographic World magazine. Brigman also illustrated a series of Star Wars novels and Choose Your Own Adventure books for Bantam Doubleday Dell. In 2005, Puffin Books published Brigman's Black Beauty adaptation graphic novel.

She returned to Marvel in 2010 with a new Power Pack story in Girl Comics #3, teaming up with Simonson again. Subsequently she pencilled two issues of Herc in 2011. For DC, she pencilled Convergence Superman: Man of Steel #1–2 (written by Louise Simonson) and Convergence Infinity Inc. #2 in 2015. From 2016 to 2017 she created several variant covers for different Marvel series. Also in 2016, Brigman became the artist of the Mary Worth newspaper comic strip. Her husband, Roy Richardson, had already inked, colored and lettered her syndicated strip Brenda Starr, Reporter and did the same on Mary Worth.

As a teacher, Brigman has worked at times as an instructor at The Kubert School in Dover, New Jersey, since 2005. She also worked part-time as a professor of sequential art at the Atlanta branch of Savannah College of Art and Design for several years until summer of 2018. As of 2021, she works as a professor of comic storytelling art at Kennesaw State University's School of Art and Design.

In 2018, she joined new comics publisher Ahoy Comics as penciller and cover artist of Captain Ginger, written by Stuart Moore. The next year, she reunited with Simonson for a Power Pack oneshot for Marvel.

In April 2022, Brigman contributed to Operation USA's benefit anthology book, Comics for Ukraine: Sunflower Seeds, a project spearheaded by IDW Publishing Special Projects Editor Scott Dunbier, whose profits would be donated to relief efforts for Ukrainian refugees resulting from the February 2022 Russian invasion of Ukraine. Brigman and writer Louise Simonson produced an original story with new characters created specifically for the anthology.

In 2024, Marvel Comics published the five-issue retro series Power Pack: Into the Storm with art by June Brigman and written by Louise Simonson, with a story, that takes place during their original Power Pack run.

== Awards ==
Brigman received an Inkpot Award in 2014.

== Bibliography ==
=== AC Comics ===
- Venture #1 (1986)

=== Ahoy Comics ===
- Captain Ginger #1–4 (2018–2019)
- Captain Ginger Season Two #1–6 (2020)
- FCBD: Dragonfly and Dragonflyman #1 (Captain Ginger story) (2019)

=== ComicMix ===
- Mine! OGN (Captain Ginger story) (2018)

=== CrossGen Comics ===
- Meridian #27–28, 31–32 (2002–2003)
- Sojourn #12 (2002)

=== Dark Horse Comics ===
- Star Wars: River of Chaos #1–4 (1995)

=== DC Comics ===
- Convergence Infinity Inc. #2 (2015)
- Convergence Superman: Man of Steel #1–2 (2015)
- General Mills Presents Justice League #3 (promo) (2016)
- Legion of Super-Heroes vol. 4 #37 (1992)
- New Talent Showcase #4 (1984)
- New Titans #89 (1992)
- Newstime #1 (1993)
- Supergirl vol. 3 #1–4 (1994)
- Supergirl/Lex Luthor Special #1 (1993)
- Who's Who: The Definitive Directory of the DC Universe #13 (1985)
- Who's Who: The Definitive Directory of the DC Universe: Update '87 #4 (1987)

=== IDW Publishing ===
- Comics for Ukraine: Sunflower Seeds (anthology) (2022)

=== Marvel Comics ===
- Alpha Flight #45–46, 49–50, 52, 100, Annual #2 (1987, 1991)
- Avengers Spotlight #38 (1990)
- Barbie #3–4, 8, 12, 19 (1991–1992)
- Barbie Fashion #5 (1991)
- Captain Planet and the Planeteers #8 (1992)
- Cheap Trick: Busted (promo) (1990)
- Classic X-Men #29 (1989)
- Cloak and Dagger vol. 2 #11 (1987)
- Daredevil Annual #7–8 (1991–1992)
- Fantastic Four vol. 5 #5 (2014)
- Girl Comics #3 (Power Pack) (2010)
- Herc #7–8 (2011)
- Marvel Age Annual #1 (1985)
- Marvel Comics Presents #36 (1989)
- Marvel Fanfare #25, 33 (1986–1987)
- Marvel Illustrated: Swimsuit Issue #1 (1991)
- New Mutants #56, Annual #4 (1987–1988)
- Official Handbook of the Marvel Universe #9, 12 (1983)
- Official Handbook of the Marvel Universe Deluxe Edition #5–8, 12–13, 19 (1986–1987)
- Power Pack #1–4, 6–8, 11–12, 14–17, 45, (Note: Due to an editorial mistake, the credits for #45 were also printed in #44, resulting in that issue being credited to June Brigman, when it was actually drawn by Jon Bogdanove. This mistake is acknowledged in the letters columns of Power Pack #46 and 47.) Holiday Special (1984–1985, 1989, 1992)
- Power Pack: Grow Up #1 (2019)
- Power Pack: Into the Storm #1–5 (2024)
- Savage Sword of Conan #100 (1984)
- Sensational She-Hulk in Ceremony #1–2 (1990)
- Solo Avengers #9 (Hellcat co-feature) (1988)
- Spider-Man and Power Pack #1 (promo) (1984)
- Strange Tales vol. 2 #13–14 (Cloak and Dagger) (1988)
- Uncanny X-Men #204 (1986)
- Web of Spider-Man Annual #6 (1990)
- Women of Marvel #1 (among others) (2021)
- What The--?! #1 (1988)
- X-Factor #20 (1987)

=== Puffin Books ===
- Black Beauty GN (2005)

=== Teshkeel Comics ===
- The 99 #4 (2008)

=== Topps Comics ===
- The Marriage of Hercules and Xena #1 (1998)
- Return to Jurassic Park #9 (1996)

== Syndicated comic strips ==
- Brenda Starr, Reporter (1995–2011)
- Mary Worth (2016–)

== Notes ==
Preceded by n/a	Power Pack penciller 1984–1985	Succeeded by Brent Anderson
Preceded by Ramona Fradon	Brenda Starr, Reporter artist 1995–2011	Succeeded by n/a
Preceded by Joe Giella	Mary Worth penciller 2016–present	Succeeded by current
