= Brendon (footballer, born 1992) =

Brazilian footballer

Personal information
- Full name: Brendon Eric de Souza Silva
- Date of birth: 26 October 1992 (age 34)
- Place of birth: Jequié, Brazil
- Position: Midfielder

Youth career
- 2008–2012: Bahia

Senior career*
| Years | Team | Apps | (Gls) |
| 2012–2013 | Bahia | 0 | (0) |
| 2012 | → Monte Azul (loan) | 0 | (0) |
| 2013 | → Goianésia (loan) | 0 | (0) |
| 2013 | Juazeiro | 9 | (0) |
| 2013–2014 | Galícia | 15 | (3) |
| 2015 | Velo Clube | 0 | (0) |
| 2015 | Jacobina | 5 | (0) |
| 2015 | Santa Rita | 2 | (0) |
| 2016–2019 | Santos | 0 | (0) |
| 2016 | → Vitória das Tabocas (loan) | 15 | (3) |
- * Club domestic league appearances and goals as of 8 October 2017

Brendon Eric de Souza Silva (born 26 October 1992), simply known as Brendon, is a Brazilian footballer who plays as a midfielder.

== Club career ==
Brendon was born in Jequié, Bahia, and finished his formation with Bahia. On 29 November 2011, he moved to Monte Azul on loan until the end of the 2012 Campeonato Paulista Série A2; however, he only featured in two matches as an unused substitute.

In 2013 Brendon also joined Goianésia on loan, but again remained unused. He subsequently cut ties with his parent club, and signed for Juazeiro. He made his senior debut on 24 March 2013, starting in a 1–0 Campeonato Baiano away loss against Vitória.

In September 2013 Brendon moved to Galícia. On 15 November of the following year he joined Velo Clube, but left the club the following January without making an appearance.

For the 2015 season, Brendon played for Jacobina Esporte Clube and Santa Rita. In the following year, he agreed to a contract with Santos, but was subsequently loaned to Vitória das Tabocas. Returning to Peixe in 2017, he was assigned to the B-team.

== Career statistics ==
As of 8 October 2017

| Club | Season | League | | | State League | | Cup | | Continental | | Other | | Total | |
| Club | Season | Division | Apps | Goals | Apps | Goals | Apps | Goals | Apps | Goals | Apps | Goals | Apps | Goals |
|---|---|---|---|---|---|---|---|---|---|---|---|---|---|---|
| Monte Azul | 2012 | Paulista A2 | — | | 0 | 0 | — | | — | | — | | 0 | 0 |
| Goianésia | 2013 | Goiano | — | | 0 | 0 | — | | — | | — | | 0 | 0 |
| Juazeiro | 2013 | Baiano | — | | 9 | 0 | — | | — | | — | | 9 | 0 |
| Galícia | 2013 | Baiano | — | | — | | — | | — | | 6 (Note: Appearance(s) in Copa Governador do Estado da Bahia) | 1 | 6 | 1 |
| Galícia | 2014 | Baiano | — | | 15 | 3 | — | | — | | — | | 15 | 3 |
| Galícia | Total | | — | | 15 | 3 | — | | — | | 6 | 1 | 21 | 4 |
| Velo Clube | 2015 | Paulista A2 | — | | 0 | 0 | — | | — | | — | | 0 | 0 |
| Jacobina | 2015 | Baiano | — | | 5 | 0 | — | | — | | — | | 5 | 0 |
| Santa Rita | 2015 | Alagoano | — | | 2 | 0 | — | | — | | — | | 2 | 0 |
| Vitória das Tabocas | 2016 | Pernambucano | — | | 15 | 3 | — | | — | | — | | 15 | 3 |
| Santos | 2017 | Série A | 0 | 0 | — | | — | | — | | 6 (Note: Appearance(s) in Copa Paulista) | 0 | 6 | 0 |
| Career total | | | 0 | 0 | 46 | 6 | 0 | 0 | 0 | 0 | 12 | 1 | 58 | 7 |
