= Ulmus americana 'Brandon' =

Elm cultivar

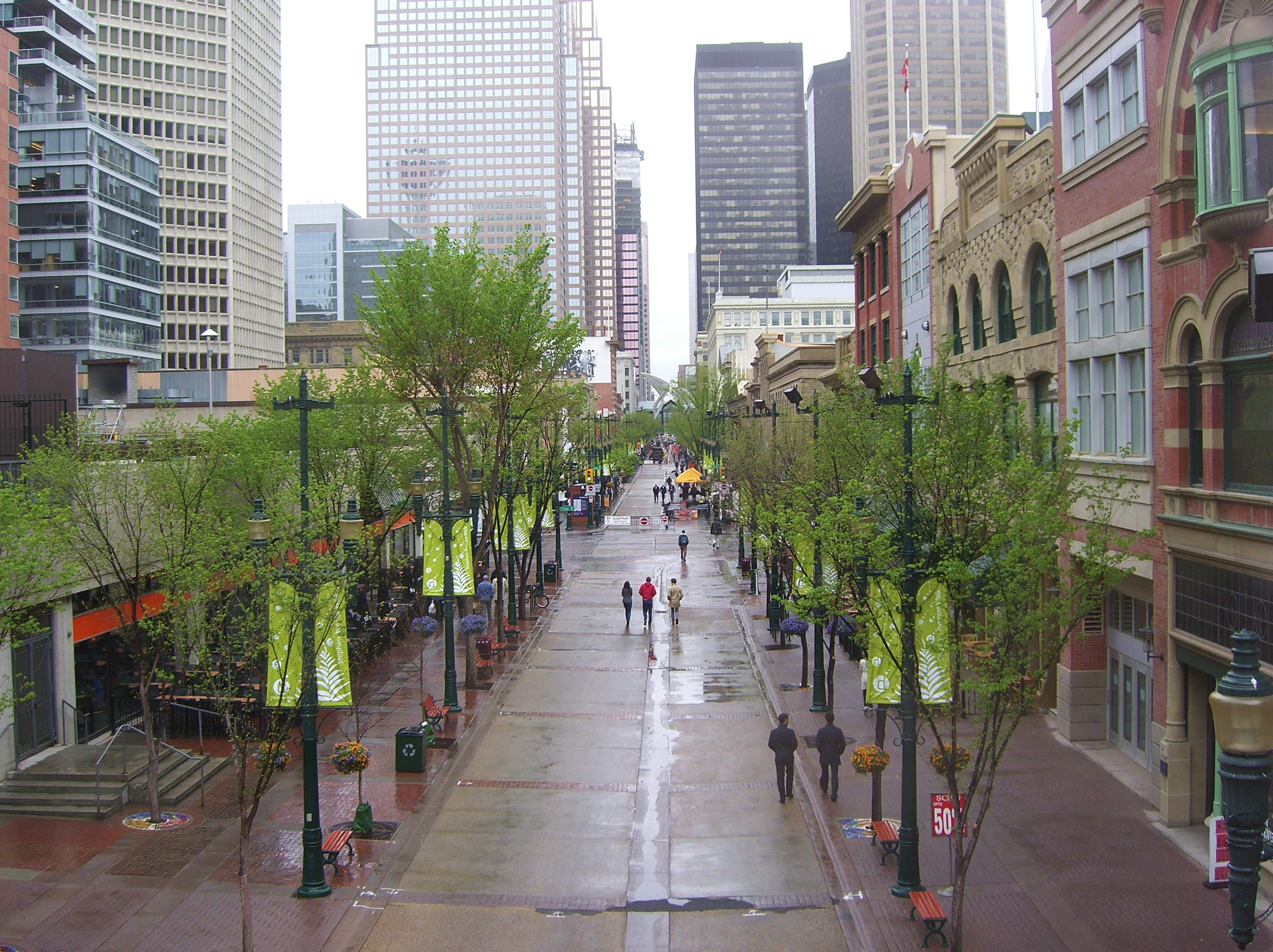
- 'Brandon' elms, Stephen Ave. Mall, Calgary
- Species: Ulmus americana
- Cultivar: 'Brandon'
- Origin: Lacombe Nurseries, Alberta, Canada

The American elm cultivar Ulmus americana 'Brandon' was raised by Lacombe Nurseries Lacombe, Alberta, Canada, before 1969; it may be synonymous with another cultivar from the same source known as 'Patmore', selected and raised by R. H. Patmore from a native tree in Brandon, Manitoba.

== Description ==
'Brandon' (or 'Patmore') differs from most American elms in possessing a smaller, more compact form bearing coarsely-toothed foliage. The tree performed very well in government trials in Alberta, Canada, emerging as 'Highly Recommended'.

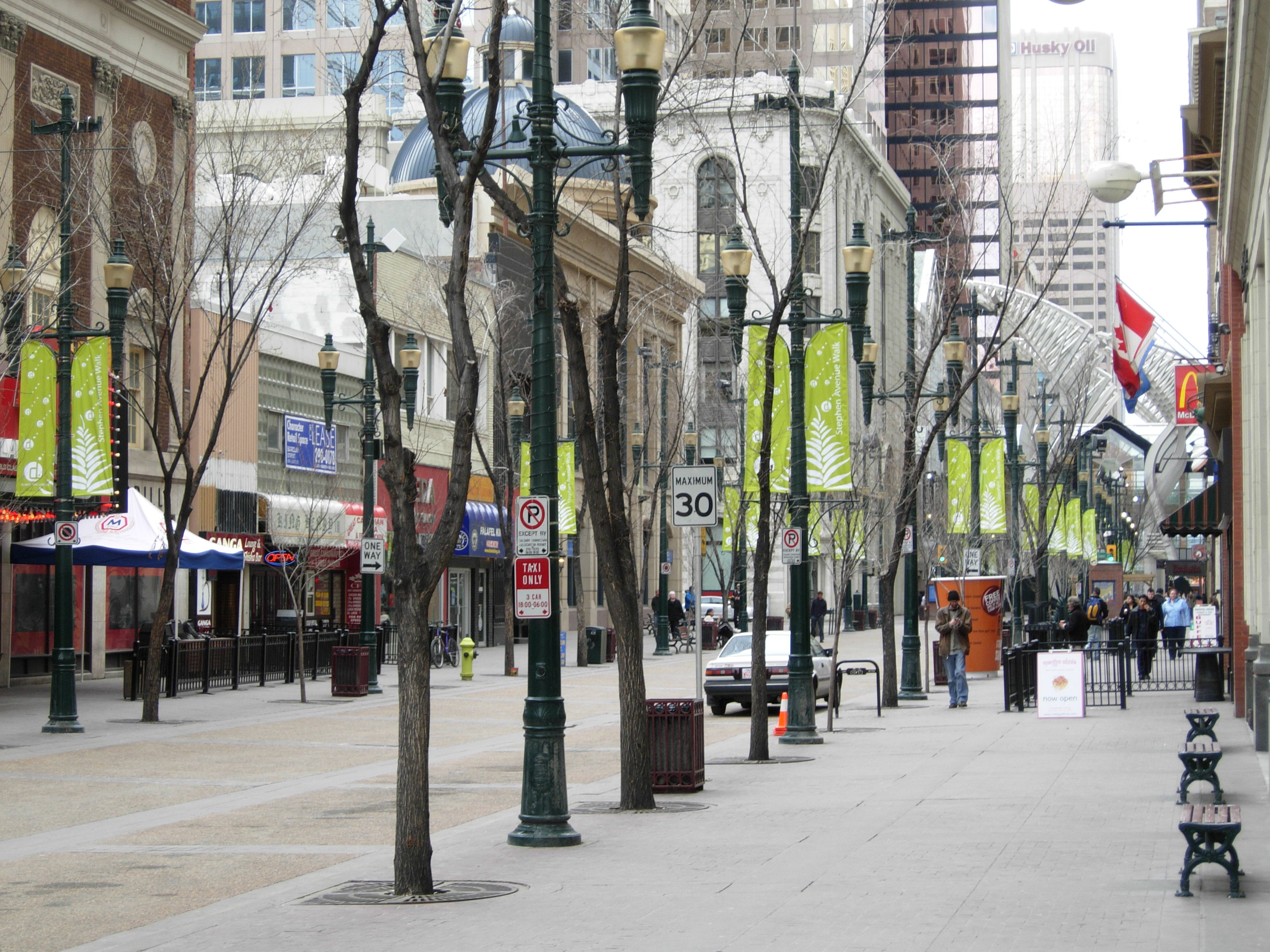
'Brandon' elms, Stephen Avenue Mall, Calgary

== Pests and diseases ==
'Brandon' is highly susceptible to Dutch elm disease. The species as a whole is susceptible to elm yellows; it is also moderately preferred for feeding and reproduction by the adult elm leaf beetle Xanthogaleruca luteola, and highly preferred for feeding by the Japanese beetle Popillia japonica in the United States. U. americana is also the most susceptible of all the elms to verticillium wilt.

== Cultivation ==
The tree remains common across the Prairie Provinces (Alberta is free of Dutch elm disease and other malaises typical of the American elm). 'Brandon' also remains in cultivation in the city of Bozeman, Montana, where it is prized as an amenity tree by the Forestry Division, and in California. The tree is not known to have been introduced to Europe or Australasia.

== Synonymy ==
- 'Brandon Ascending': Proc. 27th Ann. Mtg. Western Canad. Soc. Hort., Manitoba, 1971, as Brandon Ascending, from Patmore Nurseries, Brandon, Manitoba.
- ?'Patmore': Anon.

== Accessions ==
None known.

== Nurseries ==
- Foothills Nurseries, California, US.
- Jeffries Nurseries, Portage la Prairie Manitoba, Canada
- Sun Valley Garden Centre, Eden Prairie, Minnesota, US
