= Brandon Lake (Minnesota) =

- Location within Minnesota
- Location: Douglas County, Minnesota
- Coordinates: 45°51′21″N 95°36′1″W
- Type: lake
- Surface elevation: 1,371 feet (418 m)

Brandon Lake is a lake in Douglas County, in the U.S. state of Minnesota. Brandon Lake was named for John Brandon, a farmer who settled there.

== See also ==
- List of lakes in Minnesota
