= Frederick Williams-Taylor =

Canadian banker

Sir Frederick Williams-Taylor
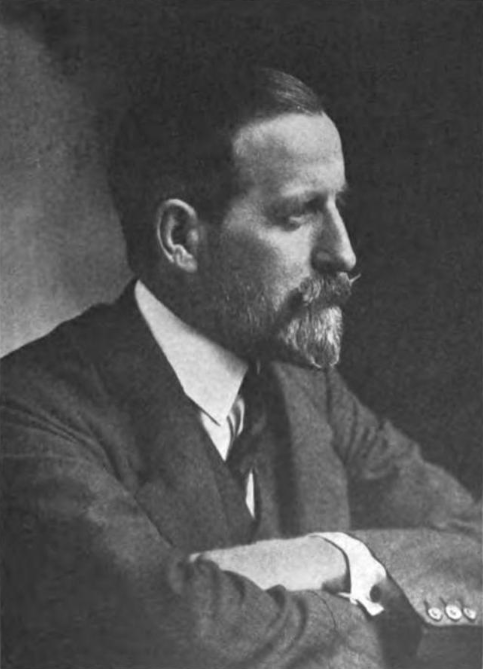
- Born: Frederick William Taylor; October 23, 1863; Moncton, New Brunswick, British North America
- Died: August 2, 1945 (aged 81); Montreal, Quebec, Canada
- Known for: General manager of the Bank of Montreal
- Spouse: Jane Fayrer Henshaw (m. 1888)
- Children: 2
- Relatives: Brenda Frazier (granddaughter)

Sir Frederick Williams-Taylor (October 23, 1863 – August 2, 1945) was a Canadian banker. He was general manager of the Bank of Montreal.

== Early life ==
Frederick was born in Moncton, New Brunswick on October 23, 1863. He was the son of Ezekiel Moore Taylor, from County Donegal, Ireland, and Rosaline (née Beatty) Taylor, born in Moncton, New Brunswick.

His paternal great-grandfather was Capt. Moore (d. 1849) of Buncrana Castle in Inishowen, Ireland (third son of William Thornton-Todd, heir of both Isaac Todd, the prominent Montreal merchant with the North West Company, and William Thornton, a British Army officer who served as Lieutenant Governor of Jersey) and his maternal great-grandfather was Joseph Morse (30 Nov 1721 Medfield MA-1769 Amherst, Nova Scotia), a pre-Loyalist planter to Nova Scotia. This Irish ancestry has not been proven.

Williams-Taylor was educated at the Moncton Superior School until he began working in 1878. In 1914, he was honored with the honorary degree of doctor of laws by the University of New Brunswick.

== Career ==
In 1878, Williams-Taylor joined the Bank of Montreal and by 1897, he was appointed Assistant Inspector, Head Office. In 1903, he became the Joint Manager of the bank in Chicago and by 1906, he was promoted to Manager of the bank in London, England, and eventually, and General Manager of the bank in 1913.

In 1913, Frederick Williams-Taylor was knighted by King George V, and combined his middle name and birth surname into a new hyphenated surname. He received an honorary degree of Doctor of Laws from the University of New Brunswick in 1915.

== Personal life ==
In athletics, he "earned great distinction in skating, rowing, tennis, squash, racquets, and stroked the Wanderers four-oared crew" in Halifax, in 1886.

In June 1888, he married the former Jane Fayrer Henshaw (1868–1950), a daughter of Mr. Joshua Henshaw of Montreal. Together, they had a daughter:

- Brenda Germaine Henshaw Williams-Taylor (1889–1948), who married Frank Duff Frazier of the prosperous Boston family in 1917. They divorced in January 1926 (he died of throat cancer in 1933) and she married Frederic Newell Watriss (1871–1938). After his death, she married Henry Pierrepont Perry (1878–1966) in 1942.
- Frederick Travers Williams-Taylor (1894–1926), a Lt. formerly of the 13th Hussars, Bimbashi Sudan Defence Force and veteran of World War I who died in 1926.

Just before her daughter's wedding in Montreal in December 1917, Lady Williams-Taylor was painted by the Swiss-born American society artist Adolfo Muller-Ury at his palatial home, Star Acres, in Nassau in the Bahamas, after which he attended the wedding ceremony. While living in the Bahamas, Sir Frederick and Lady Williams-Taylor were close friends of the Duke (formerly Edward VIII) and Duchess of Windsor.

Williams-Taylor died in Montreal, Quebec on August 2, 1945.

=== Descendants ===
Through his daughter Brenda, he was the grandfather of Brenda Frazier (1921–1982), known as one of the most famous American debutantes during the Depression era.
