= J. Brendan Ryan =

J. Brendan Ryan is the vice chairman of FCB Worldwide, a global advertising agency network.

== Career ==
Ryan graduated from Regis High School in Manhattan and holds a B.A. in history from Fordham University and an M.B.A. from Wharton. He spent nearly a decade in product management at General Foods and then began a 14-year career at Ogilvy & Mather. He served in a variety of senior posts including head of the New York office and executive vice president, executive director of client services worldwide. He came to international prominence for his work as Ogilvy & Mather’s executive director for all global activities on the American Express and Kraft Foods accounts. Earlier, Ryan spent nearly a decade in product management at General Foods. He also served as vice president of marketing at Citibank.

Ryan joined Foote, Cone & Belding (FCB) 1991 as President and CEO of FCB New York. Under his leadership, FCB New York's billings doubled to surpass $1 billion. In 1996, he was promoted to Chairman and CEO of FCB Worldwide. In 2004, Steve Blamer assumed the responsibilities of CEO and Ryan continues in his role as FCB’s Chairman. In June 2006 FCB merged with Draft Direct Worldwide to form DraftFCB, where Ryan was named vice chairman.
