= Brendan Ryan (footballer) =

Australian rules footballer (born 1964)

Personal information
- Born: 1 July 1964 (age 62)
- Original team: Myrtleford
- Height: 188 cm (6 ft 2 in)
- Weight: 86 kg (190 lb)

Playing career^{1}
| Years | Club | Games (Goals) |
| 1983–1986 | North Melbourne | 17 (18) |
| 1986 | Fitzroy | 1 (0) |
| Total | | 18 (18) |
- ^{1} Playing statistics correct to the end of 1986.

Brendan Ryan (born 1 July 1964) is a former Australian rules footballer who played with North Melbourne and Fitzroy in the Victorian Football League (VFL).

A Myrtleford recruit, Ryan made two appearances for North Melbourne in the 1983 VFL season, then didn't feature at all in 1984. On his return game in 1985, North Melbourne's one point win over Melbourne at the MCG in round six, Ryan kicked five goals. That was followed up with four goals the next weekend, when North Melbourne defeated Essendon. He played another nine games that year, then four in 1986, before crossing to Fitzroy mid-season. His only appearances for Fitzroy came in their round 15 win over Carlton at Waverley Park.
