= Brenda Weathers =

American activist

- Born: October 26, 1936; Smithfield, Texas
- Died: March 20, 2005 (aged 68); Long Beach, California
- Occupations: Writer, activist, social worker

Brenda Kay Weathers (October 26, 1936 – March 20, 2005) was an American activist and writer. She founded the Alcoholism Center for Women in Los Angeles, and was active on behalf of LGBTQ rights, women's rights, and animal protection. She also wrote three novels with supernatural themes and lesbian main characters.

== Early life and education ==
Weathers was born in Smithfield, Texas, the daughter of Jones Will Weathers and Alida Irene Nabors Weathers. Her father was a Baptist minister, and her mother was a teacher. She attended Brownfield High School, Baylor University, and Texas Woman's University, but was expelled from TWU in 1957, after her relationship with another female student became known. She earned a bachelor's degree in anthropology at the California State University, Long Beach.

== Career ==
=== Activism and service work ===
Weathers was an activist for gay rights and women's rights in Los Angeles, and a social worker in Los Angeles County. "We lesbians had to march in the gay pride parade together with the guys who were dragging a twenty-foot papier-mâché penis down Hollywood Boulevard!" she later recalled about the 1971 Pride Parade. Her younger sister Carolyn also moved to Los Angeles by 1970, and both sisters were involved in activism and writing.

In 1974, Weathers, by then a recovering alcoholic, founded a rehabilitation program, the Alcoholism Center for Women (ACW) in Los Angeles, considered the first such facility primarily serving lesbian women. It was at first based in the Gay and Lesbian Community Services Center in Hollywood, but soon became a separate nonprofit and found its own space at a pair of historic houses in the city's Pico-Union neighborhood. "I feel that two very important ingredients are love and helping to instill in the woman a feeling of self fulfillment," she said of the center's approach. "Sobriety gives one the opportunity to become the person you always thought you could be become."

Weathers moved to San Francisco in 1977, and ran another recovery program there. She moved again in the 1980s, to Seattle, where she was director of the Gay and Lesbian Chemical Dependency Program until she resigned in 1987. She lived in New Mexico in the 1990s, where she ran the Northern New Mexico Animal Protection Society, and moved back to Southern California to run Actors and Others for Animals, a nonprofit organization. In her last job, she was executive director of WomenShelter in Long Beach, which offered emergency housing to women who were escaping domestic violence.

=== Writing and publications ===
Weathers was also a writer. "Nobody was telling me I couldn't do it," she said in a 1986 interview, "And lots of people were telling me I could." Her mystery novels have supernatural themes and lesbian main characters.

- "Alcoholism and the Gay Woman" (1974)
- "Alcoholism and the Lesbian Community" (1980)
- The House at Pelham Falls (1986)
- Miss Pettibone and Miss McGraw (1996)
- Murder on the Mother Road (2005)

== Personal life and legacy ==
Weathers met her longtime partner Vicki Lewis in Seattle. Weathers died from lung cancer in 2005, at the age of 68, at her home in Long Beach, California. In 2012 she received a posthumous Rainbow Key Award from the Lesbian and Gay Advisory Board of the Los Angeles City Council. The Alcoholism Center for Women still serves women in recovery, including a residential program, and their buildings are recognized as historic sites by preservation organizations.
