= Brendan O'Neill (businessman) =

British business executive (b.1948)

Brendan Richard O'Neill (born 6 December 1948) is a British business executive.

O'Neill was educated at West Park Grammar School, St Helens, and studied natural sciences at Churchill College, Cambridge (MA) before completing his PhD in chemistry at the University of East Anglia. He was CEO of ICI from 1999 to 2003, having previously been CEO of Diageo from 1997 to 1998. He has held directorships at Informa, Aegis Group, Guinness, United Distillers and EMAP, is a Fellow of the Chartered Institute of Management Accountants, and a trustee of Cancer Research UK.
