= Brenda Willis =

American politician

Member of the New Hampshire House of Representatives
- In office November 8, 2016 – December 4, 2018
- Constituency: Rockingham 6

Personal details
- Party: Republican

Brenda Willis is an American politician who was a member of the New Hampshire House of Representatives and represented Rockingham 6th district.

She was a primary candidate for Rockingham 13 in the 2022 election.
