= Château de Brandon =

Castle in Bourgogne-Franche-Comté, France

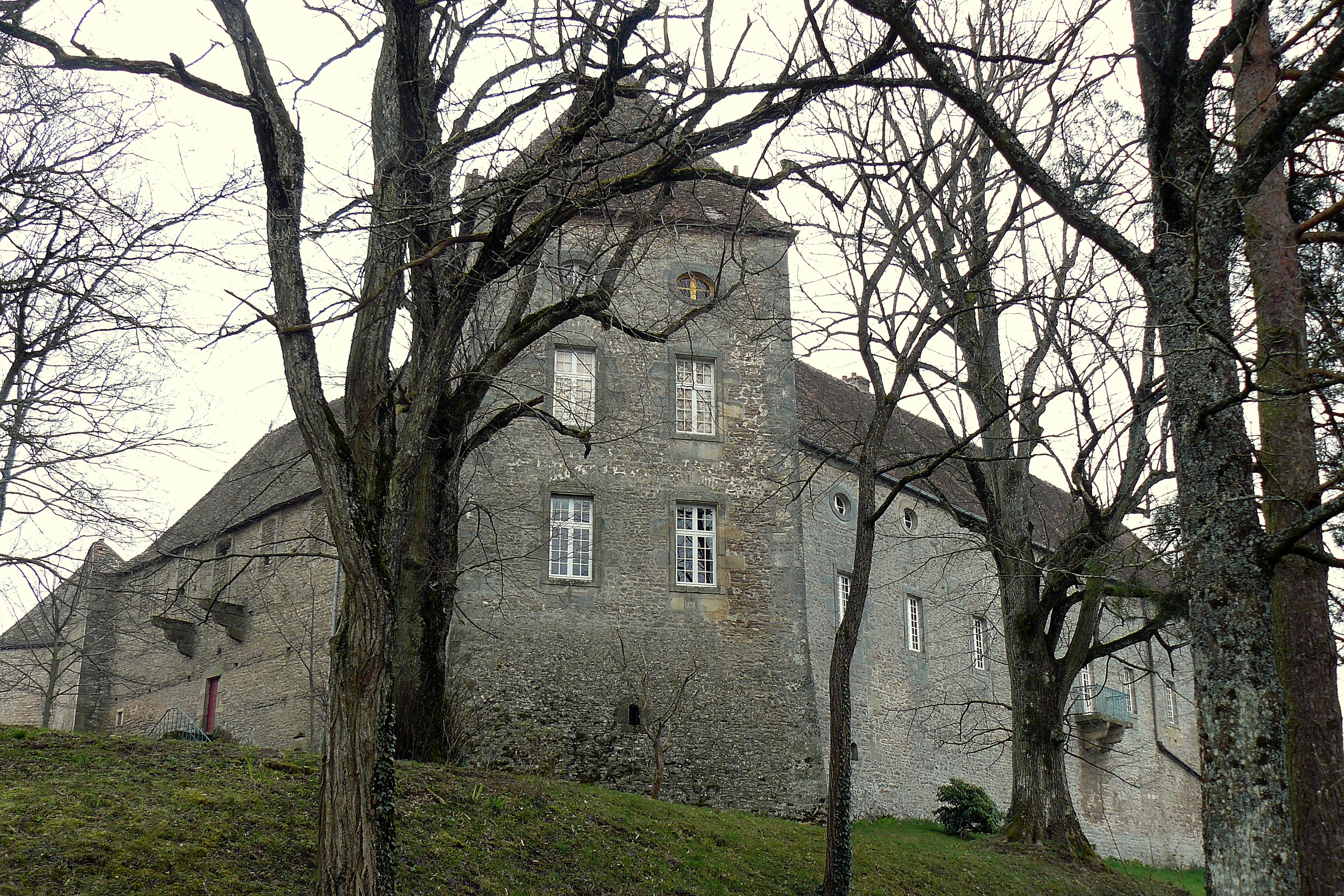
- Château de Brandon

- Location within France
- 46°51′01″N 4°28′53″E

History
- Built: 12th century and 18th century
- Original use: Castle

Site notes
- Current use: Museum
- Owner: Masin family
- Website: http://www.chateau-de-brandon.com

Monument historique
- Designated: 1975

The Château de Brandon is a castle in the commune of Saint-Pierre-de-Varennes in the Saône-et-Loire département of France.

== History ==
The castle was built on the site of Gallo-Roman camp. Although it undoubtedly existed before, there is no documentary evidence before the 13th century when a charter shows it as a purely defensive site under the Duchy of Burgundy, which it remained until the 15th century.

It is an excellent example of military architecture with upper and lower walled courtyards, 12th century round walk and a 13th-century drawbridge tower. The main building was modified during the reign of King Louis XIII where the fortress was turned into a 17th-century residence.

== Description ==
The castle stands on top of a hill. The buildings are distributed around an irregular shaped enceinte divided into two by a wall separating the farmyard of the lower courtyard from the residential court. The latter, of lengthened rectangular form, is flanked in the north-western and north-eastern corners by square towers. A wing at right angles occupies the east side; it is connected by a section of wall to a third square tower. The courtyard is completed by the agricultural buildings and a stable. A gate tower located at the south-western corner gives access to this area.

== History ==
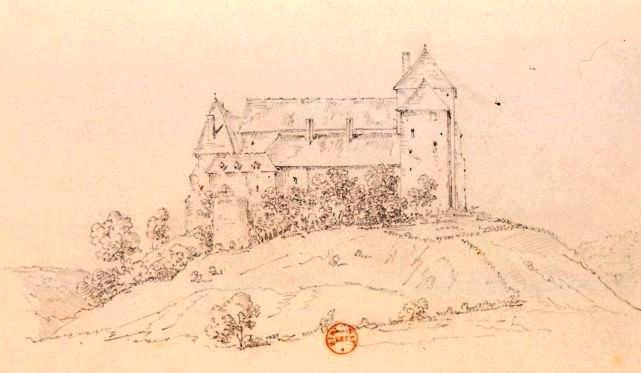
The castle in the 19th century

Sources:

- Ancient Rome : military post at junction of routes.
- 13th century :probable existence of a strengthened tower owned successively by the lords of Brandon then by captains who hold it in the name of the dukes of Burgundy.
- 1365 : the tower is entrusted to Robert d' Essertenne who becomes its hereditary lord.
- 14th century : the duke Philippe II of Burgundy raises the stronghold to a barony to the advantage of Philippe de la Roche, grandson of the preceding.
- 1453 : castle sold.
- 1528 : after complex successions within the Lugny family, the castle is acquired by Hugues-Bernard de Montessus
- 1633 : property seized by Charles de Montessus, great-grandson of the preceding.
- 1638 : sold to Alphonse de Chaumelis.
- 1653 : death of Alphonse de Chaumelis who leaves two daughters – Jeanne et Huguette – under the supervision of their uncle, Jean-Baptiste de Chaumelis.
- 1670 : Huguette de Chaumelis, daughter of Alphonse, marries Claude de la Coste, inherits Brandon at the conclusion of a fight against her uncle who had tried to despoil it.
- 1729 : attack on the castle by the local population organised by Eugene, son of Huguette, who seeks to dispossess his mother.
- 1729 : Jean-Baptiste, Huguette's other son, inherits the property at the death of his mother.
- 18th century : childless, Jean-Baptiste bequeaths the castle to Jeanne-Huguette de la Coste, his niece, wife of the marquis Jacques de Beaurepaire ; the main building, probably built by Chaumelis, is abandoned to the farmers.
- End of the 18th century : a Beaurepaire daughter marries Louis Furrier de Cléry who, because of a spendthrift life, has to sell Brandon.
- 1826 : the property passes to Nicolas Tripier, a lawyer, deputy, and peer of France.
- 19th century : through the daughter of the preceding, Antoine Mala becomes owner of the castle.
- Around 1900 : important restoration works carried out by the granddaughter of Nicolas Tripier, widow of Ferdinand de Jouvencel.
- 1922 : on the death of Mme de Jouvencel, the vicomte de Masin, her grandson, inherits the estate. The castle still belongs to this family.

== Today ==
The castle is privately owned. It has been listed since 1975 as a monument historique on the supplementary inventory of the French Ministry of Culture. It is a family home and open to the public in July and August.

== See also ==
- List of castles in France

== Bibliography ==
- Françoise Vignier (ed), 1985: Le Guide des Châteaux de France: 71 Saône-et-Loire. Paris: Editions Hermé (in French)
- Eugène Fyot : "Le château et les seigneurs de Brandon" in Mémoires de la Société éduenne vol 28 (1899), pp 1–104. (in French)
- Eugène Fyot : Le château et les seigneurs de Brandon, Autun, Imprimerie et Librairie Dejussieu, 1900. (in French)
