= Brenda Frazier =

American celebrity and socialite

- Frazier, 1940s
- Born: Brenda Diana Duff Frazier; June 9, 1921; Quebec, Canada
- Died: May 3, 1982 (aged 60); Boston, Massachusetts, U.S.
- Other name: Brenda Frazier Kelly Chatfield-Taylor
- Education: Miss Chapin's School for Girls; Miss Porter's School
- Spouses: Shipwreck Kelly (m. 1941; div. 1956) Robert Chatfield-Taylor (m. 1957; div. 1962)
- Children: 1

Brenda Diana Duff Frazier (June 9, 1921 – May 3, 1982) was an American socialite popular during the Depression era. Her December 1938 debutante ball was so heavily publicized worldwide, she eventually appeared on the cover of Life magazine for that reason alone. She was known and dubbed a "Poor Little Rich Girl" by the media, along with other famous debutantes and socialites Barbara Hutton, Gloria Vanderbilt, and Doris Duke.

== Early life ==
Brenda Diana Duff Frazier was born on June 9, 1921, in Quebec, Canada. Her father, Frank Duff Frazier, came from a prosperous Boston family; his own father Franklin Pierce Frazier had made his fortune in the wheat market. Her mother, the former Brenda Germaine Henshaw Williams-Taylor, was the only daughter of Sir Frederick Williams-Taylor, a general manager of the Bank of Montreal who was knighted in 1910 and combined his middle name and birth surname into a new hyphenated surname, and his wife, the former Jane Fayrer Henshaw. Frazier's parents married in December 1916.

Both of Frazier's parents drank heavily. At the time of her birth, Frazier's father went on an alcoholic bender and did not return home for months. After public fights and infidelity on both sides, the couple divorced in January 1926. In March 1926, Frazier's mother married Frederick N. Watriss, with whom she had been having an affair. After Watriss' death, she married Henry Pierrepont Perry. Over the next eight years, Frazier's parents fought over custody of Brenda. Both attempted to gain sole custody by accusing the other of immoral behavior, alcoholism, and being an unfit parent. During the custody battle, she was largely ignored by both parents and spent the majority of her time at school (Miss Chapin's School for Girls, Miss Porter's School, and a finishing school in Munich) or with her paternal grandmother. In 1933, a judge finally ruled that Frazier's parents would share custody. The judge stated, "Neither parent appears to have been in the past, nor appears to be now, any paragon of virtue in parenthood." A month after the decision was handed down, Frank Frazier died of throat cancer.

Frazier had a strained relationship with food and eating from her early years, overeating being a main issue. Brenda was described as being “chubby” up until 13 years of age, the year her mother began pressuring her to slim down in concern that her weight would have a detrimental impact on her social life. She found dieting difficult, especially since her mother was overweight and kept a cache of sweets in the home. Frazier’s friends have told stories about her eating huge lunches at restaurants and then going into the ladies' room to make herself purge so she could remain thin even if she failed the diets her mother wanted her on. Prior to shedding the pounds, her schoolmates described her as “a little fat” with a “plump face” and “big legs”. However, classmates recalled Frazier as being “absolutely beautiful” at age 14. She struggled with edema and underwent surgery to correct the condition at the age of 15 but it remained an issue.

Although Frazier had shown promise in music and art, she later lamented that she had never been given a chance to let those talents develop or to complete her education. The year before her 1938 debut, she was attending a finishing school in Munich. She had begged her mother to let her stay there and continue to study, but her mother refused, and thus her formal education ended at the age of 17.

== Fame ==
With her mother's blessing, Frazier began appearing at café society functions and was regularly photographed and featured in the society pages of magazines and newspapers at the age of 12. By the time she was a teenager, the press and public had begun taking a keen interest in wealthy members of high society who had not lost their fortunes due to the Wall Street Crash of 1929. Readers living through the Great Depression were eager to read about the lives of wealthy and glamorous "Poor Little Rich Girls" such as Frazier, Gloria Vanderbilt, Doris Duke, and Barbara Hutton, who consequently were frequently written about and photographed. The press eventually began calling them "Glamour Girls".

Frazier gained attention as a teenager after columnist Walter Winchell began writing about her; he reportedly coined the portmanteau "celebutante" in her honor. In 1936, two years before her society debut, society journalist Maury Henry Biddle Paul (known as Cholly Knickerbocker) wrote "It may seem a bit early, but I – here and now – predict Brenda Frazier will be one of the belles – if not the Belle – of her season." Cholly Knickerbocker's prediction boosted Frazier's profile and her upcoming debutante ball became one of the most anticipated social events of 1938.

Frazier was routinely photographed and popularized the famous "white-face" look: powdered white skin contrasted with red-painted lips, combined with perfectly coiffed dark hair. (She later said she suffered from neck problems because she rarely moved her head for fear of mussing her hair.) The publicity and constant attention got to the point where she found it “devastating”, turning her into an attraction and robbing her of her own identity. Concurrently, Frazier developed anorexia and bulimia to keep her weight down; she once quipped that she had "invented" anorexia. As a teenager, Frazier forced herself to vomit only “occasionally”, as it was her emergency measure for preventing weight gain. This didn’t stop her eating problems from becoming more severe in her adulthood. In her twenties, she became entrapped in an endless cycle of binge eating followed by self-induced vomiting, and extended periods of starving herself. Frazier’s friends reported that later in her life she would eat “strange” foods, restrict dinner, eat nearly all her refrigerator’s contents in one sitting, and then purge it all. Both of her eating disorders would plague her for the remainder of her life.

In 1938, the year of her debut, Frazier was dubbed "the #1 Glamour Girl" and was considered to be “the best advertisement for just about everything.” The title character in the long-running comic strip Brenda Starr, Reporter was named after her. In November, her photograph appeared on the cover of Life magazine, securing her international fame. A perfume, “Sarong” was created in her honor, department stores borrowed her likeness for fashion illustrations, and Frazier would go on to pose for Woodbury soap and Studebaker car ads (even though she could not drive), among others.

Frazier's debutante party was held on December 27, 1938, at the Ritz-Carlton in New York City with 2,000 people in attendance. Despite having the flu and swollen feet, Frazier danced with Douglas Fairbanks, Jr. and other celebrities until 6:30 am. Frazier later recalled collapsing into bed from exhaustion in the early morning hours and not being able to remember any of the days that followed. The party was featured on the front pages of newspapers around the world. She was dubbed the "Debutante of the Century".

Not all of the attention Frazier and other heiresses received was positive. Some media outlets and critics commented that Frazier was only famous for being rich and possessed no discernible talents. Frazier would later recall being booed at a Broadway nightclub one evening after she was introduced to the audience alongside such celebrities as Ben Blue and Sonja Henie. Although she felt humiliated afterward, she acknowledged that her critics were right. Frazier later admitted that she was never delighted as a debutante. She said there were times when she did relish the attention she received, but that she had never felt loved by either of her parents or valued as anything more than a status symbol or a trophy. In the book Debutante: The Story of Brenda Frazier by Gioia Diliberto, Frazier's daughter Victoria Kelly remembered her mother saying, "I'm not a celebrity. I don't deserve all this. I haven't done anything at all. I'm just a debutante." Her family was equally dumbfounded. "I fear Brenda's being spoiled," said a great-aunt at the time of her debut. "I bemoan all this spectacular notoriety."

At the age of 21, Frazier inherited a total of $3.9 million (equivalent to $59.03 million in 2024). Sources conflict on what portion of that inheritance was actually available for her use. Frazier contended that the entire sum was sequestered in a trust fund, distributable only to her children upon her death (or to Yale University if she remained childless). "Everybody thought my mother and I were swimming in wealth at the time of my debut," she wrote. "Actually we had only a little money, which the surrogate court gave us out of the trust fund income, to live on." She added, "One reason I went to the Stork Club so often was that Sherman Billingsley, to attract debutantes, served us lunch for just a dollar apiece."

== Personal life ==
Frazier married football star Shipwreck Kelly at her mother's apartment at the Ritz-Carlton in New York City on June 30, 1941. She gave birth to a daughter, Brenda Victoria, in 1945. Frazier and Kelly divorced in 1956.

After several tempestuous relationships, including ones with cartoonist Peter Arno and Howard Hughes, Frazier and her daughter moved to a small town near Cape Cod. On March 3, 1957, she married sales executive Robert Chatfield-Taylor. Frazier later told friends that she regretted marrying Chatfield-Taylor right away. They divorced in 1962.

== Later years and death ==
On March 16, 1961, Frazier attempted suicide by overdosing on sleeping pills. She was discovered and survived the attempt but would make thirty more suicide attempts throughout her life. In 1963, she wrote a piece for Life magazine – the same publication on whose cover she had appeared 25 years earlier (although the cover of that week's issue was given to the state funeral of the assassinated President Kennedy) – titled "My Debut – A Horror". In the article, she related that she was largely unhappy during her debutante year, and after years of therapy, she looked at photos of the event and noted "the mockery of faked smiles" and "how many people there are in the world who were doomed like me by unfortunate childhoods to adult lives plagued by fears and inner emptiness." Frazier also detailed the many nervous breakdowns she suffered due to the negative attention she received and was also critical of her family for having been "pushed into social functions" by them. The article sparked renewed interest in Frazier, and she appeared on several talk shows where she discussed her experiences as a "celebutante".

In her later years, she retreated from public life, dividing her time between her homes in East Harwich, Massachusetts and Beacon Hill in Boston. She became reclusive and developed an addiction to drugs and alcohol. A friend later stated that Frazier took "pills to go to sleep and pills to wake up, pills for digestion and pills to go to the bathroom, and pills to be happy and pills to be sad, and pills to be." In 1966, photographer Diane Arbus took a now-famous picture of Frazier for Esquire magazine. The photo featured a gaunt Frazier heavily made up in her signature white face powder and red lipstick, propped up in bed with a cigarette in hand, looking wearily toward the camera.

During the final 10 years of her life, Frazier suffered from ill health due to her long battles with anorexia and bulimia, and she was routinely hospitalized. On May 3, 1982, Frazier died of bone cancer at Newton-Wellesley Hospital in Boston at the age of 60. "She didn't stand a chance," wrote biographer Diliberto. "There was no way she was going to be happy. Her life was basically over before it began."

== In popular culture ==
Frazier's fame was noted in the introduction to the Rodgers and Hart song "Disgustingly Rich", the first-act finale from their 1940 show Higher and Higher:

Brenda Frazier sat on a wall.
Brenda Frazier had a big fall.
Brenda Frazier's falling down, falling down, falling down.
Brenda Frazier's falling down, my fair Minnie!

Frazier is namedropped in the Stephen Sondheim song "I'm Still Here" from the 1971 musical Follies.
