= Ramona Fradon =

American comics artist (1926–2024)

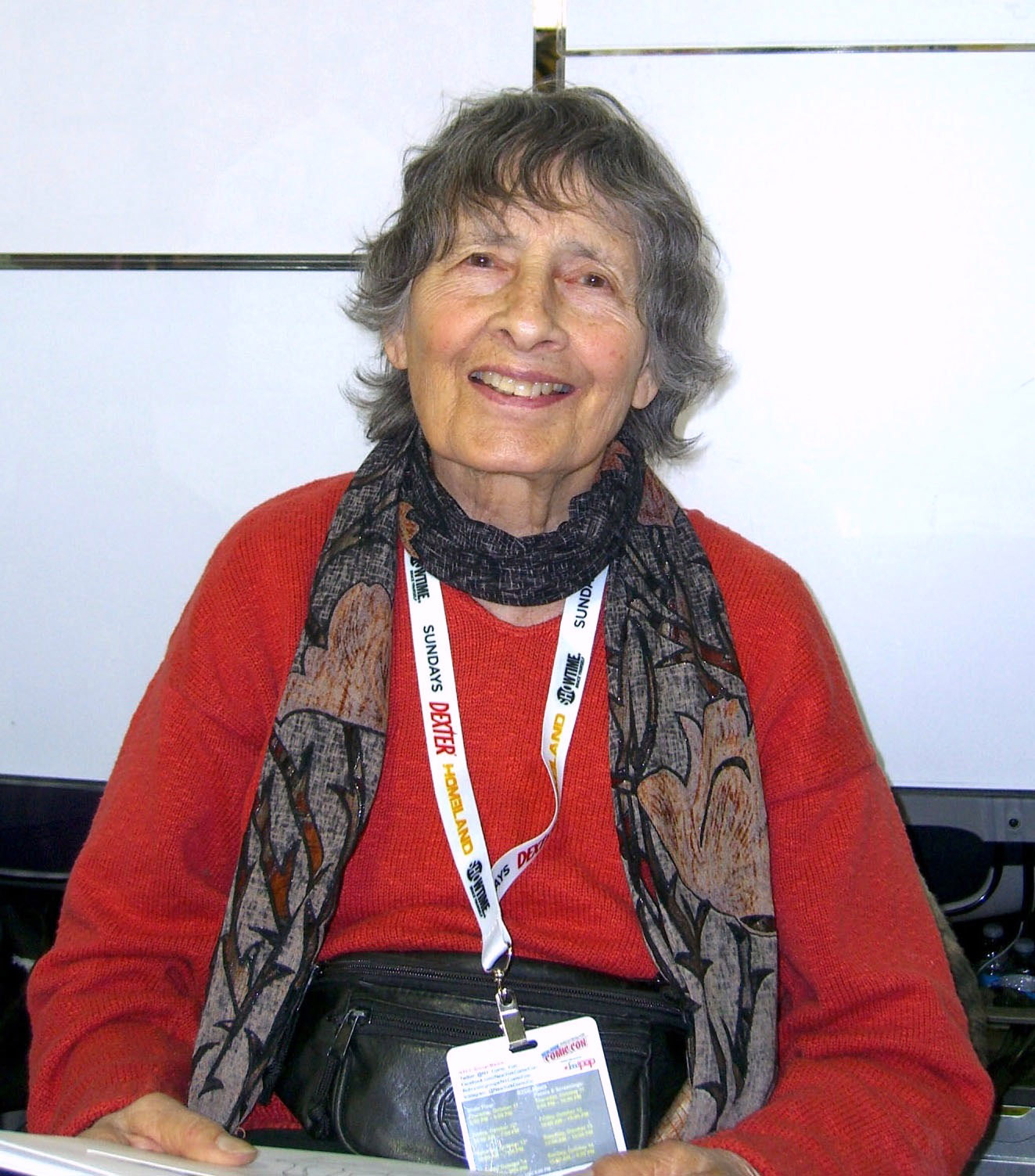
- Fradon at the 2013 New York Comic Con
- Born: Ramona Dom; October 2, 1926 Chicago, Illinois, U.S.
- Died: February 24, 2024 (aged 97) Ulster County, New York, U.S.
- Area: Artist
- Notable works: Aquaman; Metamorpho; Super Friends; Brenda Starr, Reporter
- Awards: Inkpot Award, 1995; Women Cartoonists Hall of Fame, 1999; Eisner Award Hall of Fame, 2006
- Spouse: Dana Fradon (m. 1948; div. 1982)

Ramona Dom Fradon (/ˈfreɪdən/; October 2, 1926 – February 24, 2024) was an American comics artist known for her work illustrating Aquaman and Brenda Starr, Reporter, and co-creating the superhero Metamorpho. Her career began in 1950 and lasted until her retirement in January 2024.

== Early life ==
Ramona Dom was born on October 2, 1926, in Chicago to Irma H. (née Haefeli) and Peter Dom, whose family name was shortened from Dombrezian. Her father was Armenian and her mother was Swiss. When she was five, the family moved to New York and she grew up on the outskirts of New York City in Westchester County. Her father was a well known commercial lettering man and designed logos for Elizabeth Arden, Camel, and Lord & Taylor as well as the typeface Dom Casual. Fradon also had an older brother and uncle in the lettering business. Her brother worked as a technician for the Air Corps overseas and eventually died of alcoholism. Her mother fell ill and died in 1952. She never read comic books growing up but she had a love for newspaper strips. Fradon's father was the one that encouraged her to go to art school.

== Career ==
=== 1959–1965 ===
Ramona Fradon broke into the industry just after graduating from the Parsons School of Design. Soon after she left art school, she married her husband, New Yorker cartoonist Dana Fradon, who encouraged her to try cartooning. Comic-book letterer George Ward, a friend of her husband, asked her for samples of her artwork to pitch for job openings. She landed her first assignment on the DC Comics with work on Shining Knight. Her first regular assignment was illustrating an Adventure Comics backup feature starring Aquaman. This included a revamping of the character for the Silver Age of Comics in Adventure Comics #260 (May 1959). Alongside said revamp, she and writer Robert Bernstein co-created the sidekick Aqualad in Adventure Comics #269 (February 1960).

Following her time with Aquaman, Fradon returned to co-create Metamorpho. She drew the characters to try-out appearances in The Brave and the Bold and the first four issues of the eponymous series and returned briefly to design a few covers for the title. She later commented, "I think [writer Bob Haney and I] both felt that Metamorpho was our baby. I never had an experience like I had working with Bob Haney on Metamorpho. It was like our minds were in perfect synch ... it was one of those wonderful collaborations that doesn't happen very often." Fradon drew The Brave and the Bold #59 (April–May 1965), a Batman/Green Lantern team-up, the first time that series featured Batman teaming with another DC superhero.

==== Bob Haney and Metamorpho ====
Based on an idea by DC editor George Kashdan and co-created by Bob Haney and Fradon, the character Metamorpho first appeared in The Brave and the Bold #57 and 58 in January and March 1965 before headlining a 17-issue run of the character's self-titled series from August 1965 through March 1968. Kashdan's concept involved a character made up of four elements who could change into different chemical compounds. Haney fleshed out the idea with a "deliciously overdrawn" cast. Kashdan, Haney, and Fradon worked together to create Metamorpho's look:

He wasn't your average superhero so capes and masks didn't suit him. I tried a lot of those and finally decided that since he was always changing his shape, clothes would get in his way. So I drew him in tights, with a body made up of four different colors and textures that were supposed to indicate the four elements.

=== 1972–2024 ===
Fradon enjoyed her collaboration with Haney because "his goofy stories gave me ideas about how the characters should look and act, and my goofy pictures gave him new ideas." Metamorpho allowed Fradon to use an exaggerated drawing style which suited her better than the traditional approach to superhero illustration.

From 1965 to 1972, Fradon left comics to raise her daughter. In 1972, she returned to DC where later in the decade she would draw Plastic Man, Freedom Fighters, and Super Friends which she penciled for almost its entire run. She also worked for Marvel Comics during this period, but left after only two assignments: a fill-in issue of Fantastic Four and the never-published fifth issue of The Cat. Fradon recounted:

First of all, I was really rusty. And [on The Cat #5] I was totally confounded by not drawing from a script. They gave me this one paragraph and said go draw this 17-page story. I don't think I did my best work by any means. I think I had a script on Fantastic Four, but I just don't think they were satisfied with my work. Then I went back to DC and started doing mysteries with Joe Orlando. I really had a lot of fun doing that. It suited my style, I think.

In 1980, Dale Messick retired from drawing the newspaper strip Brenda Starr, Reporter, and Fradon became the artist for it until her own retirement in 1995. She went back to college in 1980 at New York University where she studied psychology and ancient religions.

For the SpongeBob Comics, Fradon contributed to the Mermaidman stories due to her work for Aquaman.

Fradon contributed pencils to the 2010 graphic novel The Adventures of Unemployed Man, the 2012 graphic novel The Dinosaur That Got Tired of Being Extinct, and the collection The Art of Ramona Fradon.

== Retirement and death ==
Fradon announced her retirement from comics and illustrations on January 5, 2024.

Fradon died of heart failure at her home in Ulster County, New York, on February 24, at the age of 97.

== Style and industry equality ==
Feeling "like a fish out of water" in the male-dominated superhero field, she reflected on her style in a 1988 interview:

[Trina Robbins] made the observation that most women tend to have a more open style, use less shadow, and work in bigger open patterns. I think that's probably true—at least I always did (work in that style). I thought that was a big failing of mine, that I couldn't emulate that kind of photographic reproduction style. When I read that this seemed to be a characteristic of women cartoonists, it made me feel a bit better about it. ... Something that always jarred my eyes is to see the kind of heaviness and ugliness about most comic art. There's not much sweetness to it. It's the tradition, and I don't think it has anything to do with the individual artists. It's just the tradition ... the look. That always troubled me.

== Awards ==
Fradon received the Inkpot Award in 1995.

She was inducted into the Women Cartoonists Hall of Fame in 1999 and the Will Eisner Comic Book Hall of Fame in 2006.

== Bibliography ==
=== Angry Isis Press ===
- Choices #1 (1990)

=== Archie Comics ===
- Sonic the Hedgehog #68 (1999) (Pinup page)

=== Bongo Comics ===
- Simpsons Super Spectacular (Radioactive Man) #5 (2007)
- SpongeBob Comics (Mermaid Man) #3 (2011)
- SpongeBob Comics Annual (Mermaid Man) #1 (2013)

=== DC Comics ===
- 1st Issue Special #3 (Metamorpho) (1975)
- Adventure Comics #165–166 (Shining Knight); #167–168, 170–206, 208–280, 282 (Aquaman) (1951–1961)
- The Amazing World of DC Comics #10 (1976)
- The Brave and the Bold #55 (Metal Men and the Atom); #57–58 (Metamorpho); #59 (Batman and Green Lantern) (1964–1965)
- Detective Comics #170 (Roy Raymond) (1951)
- Freedom Fighters #3–6 (1976–1977)
- Gang Busters #10, 21, 25, 28, 30, 58 (1949–1957)
- House of Mystery #23, 42, 48, 56, 223, 230, 232, 235, 239, 251, 273, 275 (1954–1979)
- House of Secrets #116, 118, 121, 136 (1974–1975)
- Just Imagine... Stan Lee With Scott McDaniel Creating Aquaman #1 (2002)
- Metamorpho #1–4 (1965–1966)
- Mr. District Attorney #20–21, 32 (1951–1953)
- Plastic Man #11–20 (1976–1977)
- Plop! #8 (1974)
- Secrets of Haunted House #3, 14, 23 (1975–1980)
- Secrets of Sinister House #17 (1974)
- Showcase #30 (Aquaman) (1961)
- Silver Age Secret Files #1 (2000)
- Star Spangled War Stories #3–4, 8, 16, 184 (1952–1975)
- Super Friends #3–17, 19, 21–31, 33–34, 36–41 (1977–1981)
- Western Comics #23, 38, 40–42 (1951–1953)
- Wonder Woman Annual #2 (1989)
- World's Finest Comics #127–133, 135, 137, 139 (Aquaman) (1962–1964)

=== Marvel Comics ===
- Crazy Magazine #66 (1980)
- Fantastic Four #133 (1973)
- Girl Comics #2 (2010)

=== Nemo Publishing ===
- Sea Ghost #1 (2010)

=== Nickelodeon ===
- Nick Mag Presents (Mermaid Man and Barnacle Boy) (2003)

== See also ==
- List of female comics creators

Preceded by John Daly	"Aquaman" feature in Adventure Comics artist 1951–1961	Succeeded by Jim Mooney
Preceded by n/a	Metamorpho artist 1965–1966	Succeeded by Joe Orlando
Preceded by Pablo Marcos	Freedom Fighters artist 1976–1977	Succeeded by Dick Ayers
Preceded by Ric Estrada	Super Friends artist 1977–1981	Succeeded by Romeo Tanghal
Preceded by Dale Messick	Brenda Starr, Reporter artist 1980–1995	Succeeded by June Brigman
