= 1985 in comics =

Notable events of 1985 in comics.

== Events and publications ==
=== Year overall ===
- More independent publishers enter the marketplace: Aircel Comics, Arrow Comics, Blackthorne Publishing, Dragon Lady Press, NOW Comics, Sirius Comics, Strawberry Jam Comics, and Wonder Comics all publish their first titles. In addition, David Anthony Kraft's Comics Interview publishes its first comic book titles (it had been publishing the Comics Interview magazine since 1983).
- After 41 years as a publisher, Charlton Comics folds.
- Marvel Comics publishes Heroes for Hope: Starring the X-Men, an all-star benefit book for African famine relief and recovery.

=== January ===
- January 21: The first episode of Dan Piraro's Bizarro appears in print.
- Warrior, with issue #26, publishes its final issue (Quality Communications)

=== February ===
- February 18: The first episode of Jim Meddick's Monty is published.
- February 28:
  - Bill Tidy's The Fosdyke Saga comes to an end after having been in syndication for 14 years.
  - Jack Dunkley's The Larks is also discontinued.
- Tales of the Teen Titans #50: Donna Troy marries Terry Long. (DC Comics)
- With issue #150, Marvel Comics cancels the Spider-Man title Marvel Team-Up (Web of Spider-Man will debut two months later).

=== March ===
- March 7: Albert Uderzo is honoured as Knight in the Légion d'Honneur.
- March 17: First publication of Greg Evans' Luann.
- Peter Parker, the Spectacular Spider-Man #100: "Breakin'!" written and drawn by Al Milgrom.
- "The Surtur Saga" comes to a conclusion in Thor #353 by Walt Simonson.
- In London an exhibition of Tomi Ungerer's artwork and cartoons is wrecked with spray-paint by feminist activists led by Valerie Wise who protest against his S&M erotic cartoons.

=== April ===
- To promote and fund an upcoming museum devoted to Belgian comics, various Belgian comic artists have an official meeting with king Baudouin of Belgium and queen Fabiola at the royal palace. In 1989, this museum will open as the Belgian Comic Strip Center.
- Crisis on Infinite Earths 12-issue "maxi-series" debuts, produced by DC Comics to simplify their then-50-year-old continuity. Written by Marv Wolfman, and illustrated by George Pérez (pencils/layouts), with Mike DeCarlo, Dick Giordano, and Jerry Ordway (who shared inking/embellishing work). The series eliminates the concept of the Multiverse in the fictional DC Universe and kills off many characters, including long-standing superheroes Supergirl and Barry Allen.

=== May ===
- The Norwegian band A-ha releases a re-recorded version of their song "Take On Me", with a partially animated music video, in which a girl is brought into a comic book world. The video is directed by Steve Barron and Candace Reckinger, with the animation done by Michael Patterson. The comic featured in the music video is drawn by Michael Patterson and later printed in the sleeve of the single release.
- Sgt. Rock #400: "Easy's 400th," by Robert Kanigher and Adrian Gonzales. (DC Comics)

=== June ===
- June 1: The first episode of Yann and Bernard Hislaire's Sambre debuts in the magazine Circus.
- In the Italian magazine Corto Maltese, Y todo a media luz (or Tango) by Hugo Pratt; in Buenos Aires, Corto Maltese meets Butch Cassidy.

=== Summer ===
- Marvel Comics publishes New Mutants Special Edition #1. Written by Chris Claremont, it is the first X-Men related art by fan-favorite Art Adams with inks by Terry Austin. It continues in Uncanny X-Men Annual #9 again by Claremont and Adams with inks by Al Gordon, Mike Mignola, and Adams.

=== July ===
- July 29: Jimmy Johnson's Arlo and Janis makes its debut.
- Secret Wars II debuts continuing the adventures of the Beyonder from the original Secret Wars series.
- In Middelkerke, Belgium, the first edition of the comics festival Stripfestival Middelkerke is organized, though it's still named Milky Way Stripfestival at this point.

=== August ===
- August 23: The Dutch comics magazine Eppo changes its name into Eppo Wordt Vervolgd, to tie in with the popularity of the TV show Wordt Vervolgd (1983-1997), which deals with comics and cartoons. Under this new name it continues until 1988. In the first issue Ruud Straatman and Peter de Wit's De Familie Fortuin makes its debut.
- DC publishes Superman Annual #11: "For the Man Who Has Everything," by the future Watchmen team of Alan Moore and Dave Gibbons.

=== September ===
- September 15: The first episode of Gleever's comic strip Oktoknopie is published in the Dutch children's magazine Taptoe.
- September 15: In the Italian Disney magazineTopolino, Topolino e il segreto della Gioconda, by Bruno Concina and Massimo De Vita; the first episode of the serial Mickey and the time machine is published, which marks the debut of Dr. Spike Marlin.
- September 20: Peter de Smet wins the Stripschapprijs. Joost Swarte and the PTT Post receive the Jaarprijs voor Bijzondere Verdiensten (nowadays the P. Hans Frankfurtherprijs).
- The "Who Is Sensor Girl?" storyline, written by Paul Levitz, begins in Legion of Super-Heroes #14 (and continues through issue #27).
- Mighty Crusaders vol. 2, with issue #13, is cancelled by Archie Adventure Series.
- Missouri Demons, by Jean Michel Charlier and Colin Wilson, fourth chapter of La jeunesse de Blueberry; first chapter of the Quantrill saga.
- In Orient express, first episode of Un principe per Norma (A prince for Norma) by Giancarlo Berardi and Ivo Milazzo, retelling of Hamlet with Ken Parker as the prince and a Marylin Montoe's double as Ophelia.

=== October ===
- With issue #350, DC Comics publishes the final issue of The Flash (volume 1).
- "The Death of Jean DeWolff" story arc, written by Peter David, begins in Peter Parker, the Spectacular Spider-Man #107 (eventually running through issue #110).
- Music for Mechanics, the first Love and Rockets collection, is published by Fantagraphics.
- The Vision and the Scarlet Witch vol. 2 #1, the first issue of a 12–issue limited series.

=== November ===
- November 18: Bill Watterson's Calvin and Hobbes makes its debut.
- With issue #50, Arak, Son of Thunder (1981 series) is canceled by DC Comics.
- Tales of the Teen Titans, with issue #59, becomes a reprint book. (DC Comics)
- Iron Man #200: "Resolutions!" by Denny O'Neil, Mark D. Bright, and Akin & Garvey. Tony Stark resumes the identity of Iron Man and defeats Iron Monger. (Marvel Comics)
- In Australia the annual comics awards, the Stanley Awards, are established.
- Eloise de Montigri by Herman, second episode of The Towers of Bois-Maury (Glenat)
- The Rige by Serge Le Tendre and Régis Loisel, third chapter of the saga La Quête de l'oiseau du temps (Dargaud).

=== December ===
- The Warlord #100: double-sized issue, "Skartaris Unchained," by Michael Fleisher and Adam Kubert. (DC Comics)
- Uncanny X-Men #200: "The Trial of Magneto!," by Chris Claremont, John Romita Jr., and Dan Green. (Marvel Comics)
- Thundercats #1: "Survival Run". (Star Comics)
- December 31:
  - The Dreamer, by Will Eisner, is published by Kitchen Sink.
  - The final episode of Bernard Hislaire's Bidouille et Violette is printed in Spirou.

=== Specific date unknown ===
- The final issue of the Flemish comics magazine/fanzine Stripgids is published. It will be relaunched in October 2006.
- Alfred Bestall receives a Member of the British Empire medal.
- Will Eisner publishes the book Comics and Sequential Art.

== Deaths ==
=== January ===
- January 4: Otto Milo, Dutch film critic, comics artist and cartoonist, dies at age 62.
- January 10: José Luis Salinas, Argentine comics artist (Hernán el corsario, The Cisco Kid), dies at age 76.
- January 29: George Needham, aka George Robb, British-Australian comics artist (The Dwight Family, The Bosun and Choclit), dies at age 81.

=== February ===
- February 5: Cees Bantzinger, Dutch comics artist (Knobbel), drowns himself in a river out of shame over his war past. He is 70 years old.

=== March ===
- March 5: Kaare Bratung, Norwegian comic artist (Dagros, Baldrian), dies at age 78.
- March 24: Dick Kinney, American animator, screenwriter and comics writer (Donald Duck, Scrooge McDuck), dies at age 68.
- March 27:
  - Don Rico, American novelist and comics writer (Jann of the Jungle, Leopard Girl, Lorna the Jungle Girl), dies at age 72.
  - Hans Kossatz, German illustrator, comics artist and cartoonist (Willi und Familie Kaiser also known as: Vater Kaiser und Dackel Willi), dies at age 84.
- March 28: Ferry Zipper, Austrian-Dutch illustrator and comics artist, dies at age 74.

=== April ===
- April 11: Bill Zaboly, American comics artist (Otto Honk, worked on Popeye, Wash Tubbs, Our Boarding House), dies at age 74.
- April 15: Andries Brandt, Dutch comics artist and writer (Holle Pinkel, Horre, Harm en Hella, Aafje Anders, Tina en Debbie, Roel Dijkstra), dies at age 86.

=== May ===
- May 5: Erkki Tanttu, Finnish comics artist (Rymy-Eetu), dies at age 77.
- May 11: Chester Gould, American comics artist (Dick Tracy), dies at age 84.
- May 20: Nettie van Wijland, Dutch illustrator and comics artist (De Avonturen van Tijs Loerendraaier en Dikkie Duik), dies at age 73.

=== June ===
- June 20: Ralph A. Wolfe, American animator and comic artist (The Outline of Polar Exploration, Sancho and the Don, Animal Wisecracks, continued The Pioneers), dies at age 90.
- June 21: Charles Wojtkoski (usually credited as "Charles Nicholas"), American comics artist (Blue Beetle), dies at age 63.
- June 28: Lynd Ward, American illustrator and comic artist (God's Man, Madman's Drum, Wild Pilgrimage, Prelude to a Million Years, Song Without Words, Vertigo), dies at age 80.

=== July ===
- July: Ernie Hart, American comics writer and artist (Super Rabbit), dies at age 64.
- July 8: Frank Hampson, British comics artist (Dan Dare), dies at age 66.
- July 13: Einar Norelius, Swedish illustrator and comics artist (Pelle Svanslös, Jumbo I Djungeln), dies at age 85.

=== August ===
- August 6: Ken Ernst, American comics artist (continued Don Winslow, Mary Worth), dies at age 67.
- August 25: Pino Zac, Italian illustrator, cartoonist, comics artist and animator (Gatto Filippo), co-publisher of the magazine Il Male, dies at age 55.

=== September ===
- September 7: José Zabala-Santos, aka Mang Pepe, Filipino comics artist (Sianog Sano, Popoy, Lukas Malakas), dies at age 74.

=== October ===
- October 12: George Lemont, American comics artist (Rhode Island Red later retitled Feeny Farm, Micro-Funnies, Doctor Smock), dies from a stroke at age 58.
- October 15: Sandro Angiolini, Italian comics artist (Isabella, Vartan), dies at age 65.
- October 18: Jack Kent, American comics artist (King Aroo), dies from leukemia at age 65.
- October 22: Jean Pouzet, French comic artist (L'Histoires de France en 80 Gags), dies at age 60.
- October 23: Adolphe Barreaux, American comics artist (Sally the Sleuth, The Enchanted Stone of Time), dies at age 86.
- October 25:
  - Alberto Bróccoli, Argentinian caricaturist and comic artist (Juan y EL Preguntón, El Mago Fafa), dies at age 42.
  - Charles Kemper, Dutch painter and comics artist (De Avonturen van Bob en Bobby), dies at age 72.
- October 26: Cecil Langley Doughty, British illustrator and comics artist (Dick Turpin, continued Jack O'Lantern), dies at age 71.
- October 30: Manon Iessel, French illustrator and comics artist (Capucine), dies at age 76.

=== November ===
- November 6: Viktor Kálmán, aka Victor Vashi, Hungarian painter, animator and comics artist (Kuksi), dies at age 74.
- November 23: Roger Brand, American comics artist (Creepy, Eerie, Jungle Jim and Web of Horror), dies of liver failure at age 42.
- November 24: C. Buddingh', Dutch poet and comics writer (Spekkie en Blekkie, Jesje en Josje), dies at age 67.

=== December ===
- December 3: Sam Gilman, American actor and comics artist (worked for Funnies Inc. and Centaur Comics), dies at age 70.
- December 6: Walter B. Gibson, American magician, novelist and comics writer (The Shadow), dies at age 88.
- December 15: Lars Wangensten-Berge, Norwegian illustrator and comic artist (Bassen & Co), dies at age 80.
- December 19: Jean Ache/Jean Huet, French animator and comics artist (Achille, Archibald, Arabelle, La Dernière Sirène, Nic et Mino, Tonton Molécule, Pat'Apouf, Amanda La Pin-Up Fantôme), dies at age 62.
- December 20: Al Peclers, AKA Pec, AKA J.B. Stone, Belgian comics artist and caricaturist (Tchantchès, Les Aventures de Jolliker, L'Or du Foumouala, Roger la Bagarre, Jehan Niguedouille, Texas Jim, Timothée), dies at age 64 or 65.
- December 25:
  - Joseph Oriolo, American animator and comics artist (Casper the Friendly Ghost, made Felix the Cat comics), dies at age 72.
  - Jackie Ormes, American comics artist (Torchy Brown), dies at age 74.

=== Specific date unknown ===
- Mies Deinum, Dutch illustrator and comics artist (Sambo de Olifant, Dieren-jamboree and Myra het Elfje), dies at age 77 or 78.
- Sam Fair, British comics artist (Meddlesome Matty, Addie and Hermy, Musso the Wop), dies at age 76.
- Henri Habsch, Belgian painter and comic artist (Minouche et Rasinette et Jouetie), dies at age 72 or 73.
- Roberto Sgrilli, Italian painter, illustrator, comics artist and animator (Formichino), dies at age 87 or 88.
- John Whitfield Taylor, British teacher and gag cartoonist, dies at age 76 or 77.
- Shuhui Wang, Chinese comics artist, dies at age 72 or 73.
- Xiaoying Yue, Chinese comics artist (The Colorful Road), dies at age 63 or 64.
- Cliff Young, American comics artist, dies at age 79 or 80.

== Conventions ==
- Jan. 25-27: Angoulême International Comics Festival (Angoulême, France) — 12th annual festival
- April: 1st Annual Victoria International Cartoon Festival (Victoria, British Columbia, Canada)
- May 29–June 2: Salon International de la Bande Dessinee de Montreal (Montreal, Quebec, Canada)
- June: Heroes Convention (Charlotte, North Carolina)
- June 13–16: BD '85 (Sierre, Switzerland)
- June 22–23: Colorado Comic Art Convention (Auraria Campus Student Center, Denver, Colorado) — fifth and final iteration of the show; guests include Michael Kaluta, Elaine Lee, Stan Phillips, and Drew Litton
- July 5–7: Chicago Comicon (Ramada O'Hare, Rosemont, Illinois) — guest of honor: Sergio Aragonés
- July 5–7: Dallas Fantasy Fair (Dallas, Texas) — guests include Gil Kane, Wendy Pini, Kenneth Smith, and Gary Groth
- August 1–4: San Diego Comic-Con (Convention and Performing Arts Center and Hotel, San Diego, California) — 6,000 attendees; official guests: Ben Bova, Jack Cummings, Jack Davis, Gil Kane, Harvey Kurtzman, Alan Moore (in his only U.S. convention appearance), Dan O'Bannon, Jerry Ordway, Alex Schomburg, Julius Schwartz, Jerry Siegel, Louise Simonson, Walt Simonson
- August 2–4: Atlanta Fantasy Fair (Omni Hotel & Georgia World Congress Center, Atlanta, Georgia) — official guests include Newt Gingrich, Frederik Pohl, Theodore Sturgeon, Gerald W. Page, Ted White, Forrest J Ackerman
- September 21–22: King Kon Comic & Fantasy Convention (Eastern Michigan University Student Union, Ypsilanti, MI):
- September 21–22: United Kingdom Comic Art Convention (University of London Union, London, England) — first annual edition; £7.50 admission charge for both days; guests include Steve Bissette, Bill Sienkiewicz, Dave Sim, Marv Wolfman, Brian Bolland, John Bolton, Eddie Campbell, Alan Davis, Hunt Emerson, Brett Ewins, Dave Gibbons, Ian Gibson, Denis Gifford, Alan Grant, Garry Leach, David Lloyd, Mike McMahon, Alan Moore, Steve Moore, Paul Neary, Kevin O'Neill, Ron Smith, Dez Skinn, Bryan Talbot, and John Wagner
- November: Mid-Ohio Con (Richland County Fairgrounds, Mansfield, Ohio) — guests include John Byrne
- November 30–December 1: Creation Comic Book Convention (Roosevelt Hotel, New York City) — 15th annual show; guests include Jim Shooter, Chris Claremont, Robin Curtis, Frank Ashmore, and Terrance Dicks

== Awards ==
=== Eagle Awards ===
Presented in 1986 for comics published in 1985:

- Roll of Honour: Alan Moore

==== American Section ====
- Favourite Comic Book: Swamp Thing, written by Alan Moore (DC Comics)
- Favourite Graphic Novel: American Flagg! Hard Times, by Howard Chaykin (First Comics)
- Favourite Single or Continued Story: Crisis on Infinite Earths #1-9
- Favourite New Comic Title: Miracleman, written by Alan Moore (Eternity Comics)
- Favourite Comic Cover: Swamp Thing #34, by John Totleben (DC)
- Favourite Character: Batman
- Favourite Supporting Character: John Constantine, from Swamp Thing
- Character Most Worthy of Own Title: Wolverine
- Favourite Group or Team: The X-Men (Marvel Comics)
- Favourite Group Book: The New Teen Titans, by Marv Wolfman (DC)
- Favourite Writer: Alan Moore, Swamp Thing (DC)
- Favourite Artist: George Pérez
- Favourite Inker: Terry Austin
- Favourite Specialist Comics Publication: Amazing Heroes

==== UK Section ====
- Favourite Artist: Alan Davis
- Favourite Writer: Alan Moore
- Favourite Comic: 2000 AD (Fleetway)
- Favourite Comic Album: Nemesis Book III (Fleetway)
- Favourite Comic Character: Halo Jones
- Favourite Villain: Torquemada, from Nemesis the Warlock
- Favourite Supporting Character: Meggan (Captain Britain)
- Character Most Worthy of Own Title: Halo Jones
- Favourite Single or Continued Story: Halo Jones Book Two (2000 AD #406-415)
- Favourite New Comic: Captain Britain (Marvel UK)
- Favourite Comic Cover: Captain Britain #6, by Alan Davis
- Favourite Specialist Comics Publication: Speakeasy

=== Kirby Awards ===
- Best Single Issue: Swamp Thing Annual #2, by Alan Moore, Steve Bissette, and John Totleben (DC Comics)
- Best Continuing Series: Swamp Thing, by Alan Moore, Steve Bissette and John Totleben (DC)
- Best Black & White Series: Cerebus by Dave Sim (Aardvark-Vanaheim)
- Best Finite Series: Crisis on Infinite Earths, by Marv Wolfman and George Pérez (DC)
- Best New Series: Zot!, by Scott McCloud (Eclipse Comics)
- Best Graphic Album: Beowulf (First Comics)
- Best Artist: Dave Stevens, for The Rocketeer (Comico)
- Best Writer: Alan Moore, for Swamp Thing (DC)
- Best Art Team: Steve Bissette and John Totleben, for Swamp Thing (DC)
- Best Cover: Swamp Thing #34, by Steve Bissette and John Totleben (DC)
- Best Comics Publication: Comics Buyer's Guide (Krause Publications)

== First issues by title ==
=== DC Comics ===
DC Science Fiction Graphic Novel: Hell on Earth

Release:. Writers: Robert Bloch and Robert Loren Fleming. Artist: Keith Giffen.

Hex

Release: November. Writer: Michael Fleisher. Artist: Mark Texeira.

The Outsiders

Release: November. Writer: Mike W. Barr. Artist: Jim Aparo.

==== Limited Series ====
America vs. the Justice Society (4 issues)

Release: January: Writers: Roy and Dann Thomas.

Crisis on Infinite Earths (12-issues)

Release: April. Writer: by Marv Wolfman. Artist: George Pérez.

The Shadow War of Hawkman (4 issues)

Release: May. Writer: Tony Isabella. Artists: Richard Howell and Alfredo Alcala.

Who's Who: The Definitive Directory of the DC Universe (26 issues)

Release: March. Editors: Len Wein, Marv Wolfman, and Robert Greenberger.

=== Marvel Comics ===
The Marvel Saga: The Official History of the Marvel Universe

Release: December. Writer: Peter Sanderson.

Swords of the Swashbucklers

Release: March by Epic Comics. Writer: Bill Mantlo. Artists: Geof Isherwood and Ricardo Villamonte.

ThunderCats

Release: December by Star Comics. Writer: David Michelinie. Artists: Jim Mooney and Brett Breeding.

Web of Spider-Man

Release: April. Writer: Louise Simonson. Artists: Greg LaRocque and Jim Mooney.

West Coast Avengers

Release: October. Writer: Steve Englehart. Artists: Al Milgrom and Joe Sinnott.

==== Limited series ====
The Bozz Chronicles (6 issues)

Release: December by Epic Comics. Writer: David Michelinie.

Eternals (12 issues)

Release: October. Writer: Peter Gillis. Artists: Sal Buscema and Al Gordon.

Longshot (6 issues)

Release: September. Writer: Ann Nocenti. Artist: Art Adams.

Moon Knight: Fist of Khonshu (6 issues)

Release: June.

Moonshadow (12 issues)

Release: March by Epic Comics. Writer: J. M. DeMatteis.

Nightcrawler (4 issues)

Release: November. Writer/Artist: Dave Cockrum.

The One (6 issues)

Release: July by Epic Comics. Writer/Artist: Rick Veitch.

Secret Wars II (9 issues)

Release: July. Writer: Jim Shooter. Artist: Al Milgrom.

Squadron Supreme (12 issues)

Release: September. Writer: Mark Gruenwald. Artists: Bob Hall and John Beatty.

=== Independent titles ===
Alien Encounters

Release: June by Eclipse Comics. Editor: Catherine Yronwode.

Femforce

Release: by AC Comics. Writer: Bill Black. Artist: Mark G. Heike.

Fish Police

Release: June by Fishwrap Productions. Writer/Artist: Steven Moncuse.

Miracleman

Release: August by Eclipse Comics. Writer: Alan Moore. Artists: Mick Anglo and Garry Leach.

Neat Stuff

Release: June by Fantagraphics. Writer/Artist: Peter Bagge.

Scout

Release: September by Eclipse Comics. Writer/Artist: Timothy Truman.

Tales from the Aniverse

Release: December by Arrow Comics. Writer/Artists: Randy Zimmerman and Susan Van Camp.

Tales of the Beanworld

Release: by Beanworld Press. Writer/Artists: Larry Marder.

Those Annoying Post Bros.

Release: Jan. by Vortex Comics. Writer/Artists: Matt Howarth.

To Be Announced

Release: July by Strawberry Jam Comics. Writer: Derek McCulloch. Artist: Mike Bannon.

== Initial appearances by character name ==
=== DC Comics ===
- Fel Andar, in The Shadow War of Hawkman #1
- Anti-Monitor, in Crisis on Infinite Earths 02 (May)
- Bekka, in DC Graphic Novel #4: The Hunger Dogs
- Black Mask, in Batman #386 (August)
- Bolphunga in Green Lantern #188 (May)
- Cadre, in Justice League of America #235
- Marcie Cooper in Infinity Inc. #14 (May)
- Doctor Light (Kimiyo Hoshi), in Crisis on Infinite Earths #4 (July)
- Doctor Mid-Nite (Beth Chapel), in Infinity, Inc. #19
- Fastball, in Justice League of America #234 (January)
- John Constantine, in Swamp Thing #37 (June)
- Jinx, in Tales of the Teen Titans #56 (August)
- Kid Devil, in Blue Devil #14 (July)
- Kole, in The New Teen Titans #9 (June)
- Lady Quark, in Crisis on Infinite Earths #4 (July)
- Looker in Batman and the Outsiders #25 (September)
- Alexander Luthor Jr., in Crisis on Infinite Earths #1 (April)
- Mekanique in Infinity Inc. #19 (October)
- Mister Bones, in Infinity, Inc. #16
- Mogo in Green Lantern #188 (May)
- Onyx, in Detective Comics #546 (January)
- Pariah, in Crisis on Infinite Earths #1
- Shadow Thief, in Vigilante #14
- Shrike in Justice League of America #235 (February)
- Superboy-Prime, in DC Comics Presents #87 (November)
- Rick Tyler, in Infinity, Inc. #20 (November)
- Jonni Thunder in Jonni Thunder #1 (February)
- Wildcat (Yolanda Montez) in Infinity Inc. #12 (March)
- David Winston in Vigilante #23 (November)
- Weasel in Firestorm #38 (August)

=== Marvel Comics ===
- Brian Banner, in The Incredible Hulk #312
- Bushmaster, in Captain America #310 (October)
- Diamondback (Rachel Leighton), in Captain America #310 (October)
- Dennis Dunphy (Demolition Man), in The Thing #28 (October)
- Erg, in Power Pack #12 (July)
- Eternals
  - Cybele, in The Eternals (vol.2) #1 (October)
  - Interloper, in The Defenders #147 (September)
  - Khoryphos, in The Eternals (vol.2) #1 (October)
  - Phastos, in Eternals (vol. 2) #1 (October)
- Fenris (Andrea & Andreas Von Strucker), in Uncanny X-Men #194 (June)
- Firestar, in Uncanny X-Men #193 (May)
- Flag-Smasher, in Captain America #312 (December)
- Freedom Force, in Uncanny X-Men #199 (November)
- Legion, in New Mutants #25
- Longshot, in Longshot #1 (September)
- Mojo, in Longshot #3 (November)
- Nimrod, in Uncanny X-Men #191 (March)
- Normie Osborn, in The Amazing Spider-Man #263 (April)
- Rattler, in Captain America #310 (October)
- Scourge of the Underworld, in Iron Man #194 (May)
- Silver Sable, in The Amazing Spider-Man #265 (June)
- Sin-Eater, in Peter Parker, The Spectacular Spider-Man #107 (October)
- Skrullian Skymaster, in Squadron Supreme #1 (August)
- Strong Guy, in New Mutants #29 (July)
- Tabitha Smith, in Secret Wars II #5 (November)
- Alistair Smythe, in The Amazing Spider-Man Annual #19
- Sharon Ventura, in The Thing #27 (September)

=== Independent titles ===
- Casey Jones, in Raphael #1 (Mirage Studios)
- Druuna, in Morbus gravis (Dargaud)
- Krillin, in Dragon Ball chapter #25 (Shueisha)
- Emanuel Santana, in Scout #1 (Eclipse Comics)
- She Cat, in Femforce #1 (AC Comics)
