= Song Without Words =

1936 wordless novel by Lynd Ward

- The book's protagonist stands defiant against a fascist world.
- Author: Lynd Ward
- Genre: Wordless novel
- Publication date: 1936
- Publication place: United States
- Pages: 21 (recto only)

Song Without Words: A Book of Engravings on Wood is a 1936 wordless novel by American artist Lynd Ward (1905–1985). Executed in twenty-one wood engravings, it was the fifth and shortest of the six wordless novels Ward completed, produced while working on the last and longest, Vertigo (1937). The story concerns the anxiety an expectant mother feels over bringing a child into a world under the threat of fascism—anxieties Ward and writer May McNeer were then feeling over McNeer's pregnancy with the couple's second child.

== Content and style ==
A woman conceives a child and suffers anguish over whether to give birth to it. She imagines one nightmare image of fascism and death after another, filled with such imagery as skulls, concentration camps, and an infant impaled on a bayonet. She ends standing defiant against the forces that threaten her, and her male partner joins her and the baby in an image of hope for the future.

Ward employs symbols much as he had in previous works, such as towering buildings representing capitalism. Vermin swarm in the pictures, heightening the expectant mother's fears—nightmare images of vultures, ants crawling over an impaled infant, and rats scattering around a Nazi concentration camp filled with children.

== Background ==
Lynd Ward (1905–1985) was a son of Methodist minister and social activist Harry F. Ward (1873–1966). Throughout his career the younger Ward displayed in his work the influence of his father's interest in social injustice. Ward married writer May McNeer in 1926 and the couple left for Europe, where Ward spent a year studying wood engraving in Leipzig, Germany. There he encountered German Expressionist art and read the wordless novel The Sun (Note: German: Die Sonne) (1919) by Flemish woodcut artist Frans Masereel (1889–1972).

Ward returned to the United States and freelanced his illustrations. In 1929, he came across German artist Otto Nückel's wordless novel Destiny (Note: German: Schicksal : eine Geschichte in Bildern) (1926) in New York City. The work inspired Ward to create a wordless novel of his own, Gods' Man (1929), which he followed with Madman's Drum (1930), Wild Pilgrimage (1932), and the short Prelude to a Million Years (1933).

Ward began engraving on Song Without Words while working on his longest wordless novel, Vertigo (1937), which took two years to complete. McNeer was pregnant with their second child and the couple were facing the same anxieties as the book's protagonist, and having worked through these issues they carried through the birth of daughter Robin. Into adulthood Robin kept a wall of her home decorated with prints from Song Without Words.

Ward returned to the themes of Song Without Words in Hymn for the Night, a retelling of the birth of Christ in Nazi Germany. The book was to have been Ward's seventh wordless novel, but he abandoned it in 1940 after engraving twenty blocks of it after finding the story too removed from his personal experiences.

== Production and publication ==
Ward produced 21 wood engravings for the book, sized 5 5/8 × 3 5/8 inches (14.3 × 9.2 cm). It appeared in 1936 in a limited edition from Random House of 1250 copies. The pages were printed from the original engravings by Equinox Press co-founder Lewis F. White. The original woodblocks are in the Lynd Ward Collection in the Joseph Mark Lauinger Memorial Library at Georgetown University in Washington, DC.
