= The Silver Pony =

First edition cover

The Silver Pony: A Story in Pictures is an illustrated children's book by American artist Lynd Ward, published in 1973.

== Summary ==
The story tells of a farmboy who finds a silver winged pony, which he lures with an apple and then flies through forests, deserts, cities, and into outer space. The boy awakens to discover it all a dream—but that in waking life his father has bought him a real silver pony.

== Production, publication, and reception ==
Ward executed the 80 wordless drawings that make up the book in casein. It was published in 1973 by Houghton, Mifflin.

Though it shares the form and length of Ward's wordless novels, it is not classified as one. The book won the Lewis Carroll Shelf Award, the Children's Book Showcase Award, and was a Boston Globe–Horn Picturebook Honor Book.

== Background ==
Ward first rose to public attention with the publication of Gods' Man in 1929, a wordless novel in engraved woodblocks. He made five more, the last of which was Vertigo in 1937, after which he worked on a variety of graphic projects, primarily in woodblocks. Some work was for children's books, for which he won awards such as a Newbery Medal for his illustrations to Elizabeth Coatsworth's The Cat Who Went to Heaven (1930), and a Caldecott Medal for his The Biggest Bear (1952). The Silver Pony was the first wordless book Ward published since he had produced Vertigo.
