= Prelude to a Million Years =

Wordless novel by Lynd Ward

The protagonist hunches over his creation.

Prelude to a Million Years: A Book of Wood Engravings is a 1933 wordless novel consisting of thirty wood engravings by American artist Lynd Ward (1905–1985). It was the fourth of Ward's six wordless novels, a genre Ward discovered while studying wood engraving in Europe, and delved into under the influence of the works of Frans Masereel and Otto Nückel. The symbol-rich story tells of a sculptor who, in his quest for ideal beauty, neglects the reality of the struggles of his neighbors in the depths of the Great Depression. The engravings are done in a softer Art Deco style in contrast to the German Expressionism-influenced artwork of Ward's earlier works.

== Background ==
Lynd Ward (1905–1985) was a son of Methodist minister and social activist Harry F. Ward (1873–1966). Throughout his career the younger Ward displayed in his work the influence of his father's interest in social injustice. Ward married writer May McNeer in 1926 and the couple left for Europe, where Ward spent a year studying wood engraving in Leipzig, Germany. There he encountered German Expressionist art and read the wordless novel The Sun (Note: German: Die Sonne) (1919) by Flemish woodcut artist Frans Masereel (1889–1972).

Ward returned to the United States and freelanced his illustrations. In 1929, he came across German artist Otto Nückel's wordless novel Destiny (Note: German: Schicksal : eine Geschichte in Bildern) (1926) in New York City. The work inspired Ward to create a wordless novel of his own, Gods' Man (1929), which he followed with Madman's Drum (1930) and Wild Pilgrimage (1932). In December 1931, Ward and McNeer were among the nine cofounders of Equinox Cooperative Press, dedicated to a hands-on approach to bookmaking.

== Content and style ==
The book opens with a dream sequence in which a sculptor worships before a flower symbolizing beauty. The sculptor struggles to capture his vision of beauty in a sculpture of an idealized woman. In his artistic pursuits he neglects the reality around him and the toll the Depression of the 1930s has taken on the people whose paths he crosses—a neighbor who is beaten by her husband, violent social protest, jingoistic nationalists, and drunkenness. He is engulfed in flames when he returns to his studio trying to flee it all.

Ward returns to the theme of an artist in a decaying culture that he explored in his first wordless novel, Gods' Man (1929), and intended the work as a commentary on how the Depression had colored outlooks since Gods' Man: headlines declaring endless layoffs, strikes, lock-outs, and political spin. To Ward, "Inevitably a process of polarization of the citizenry was set in motion".

The style has evolved from the angular German Expressionism of Ward's earlier books to a softer Art Deco one. He uses symbols throughout the book, such as the spinning of a spiderweb to indicate the passage of time, a fire hydrant echoing the emotions of a street riot, towering city buildings for capitalism, and flags for patriotism. The most prominent symbol is a flower, representing the artist's distracted quest for beauty while he remains indifferent to the turmoil around him.

== Production, publication, and reception ==
Ward made thirty wood engravings for the book, ranging in size from 5 × 3 inches (12.7 × 7.6 cm) to 5 1/4 × 3 1/4 inches (13.3 × 8.3 cm). It was published in 1933 by the Equinox Cooperative Press, a bookmaking cooperative that Ward had cofounded. The first edition was the third book Equinox published. It was limited to 920 copies and printed from the original woodblocks. It was hand-bound in French folds and a gold foil spine. Modestly priced, it sold well and brought in revenue to sustain Equinox's other book projects.

Reception was mixed. Reviewer E. L. Tinker praised Ward's visual mastery, but denigrated Ward's repetition of plot—the protagonist's "revolt against the injustices of society his preoccupation with sex, his self-loathing after he has succumbed to the scarlet woman, and his final disillusionment". Wood engraver John DePol considered Prelude to a Million Years his favorite of Ward's wordless novels.
