= Song without words =

Song Without Words may refer to:

- Songs Without Words (German: Lieder ohne Worte), a series of short, lyrical piano pieces by the Romantic composer Felix Mendelssohn, written between 1829 and 1845
- Song Without Words, a 1937 wordless novel by American artist Lynd Ward
- Moonchild: Songs Without Words, a 2006 album by John Zorn
- "Song Without Words" (Russian: Пенся Без Слов), by the band Kino from the album Zvezda po imeni Solntse in 1989

== See also ==
- Category:Songs without any language
