= Szűts =

Szűts is a Hungarian surname. Notable people with the surname include:

- Ferenc Szűts (1891–1966), Hungarian gymnast
- István Szegedi Szüts (1893-1959), Hungarian painter and illustrator
