= The Sun (wordless novel) =

1919 novel by Frans Masereel

- Author: Frans Masereel
- Original title: Le Soleil
- Genre: Wordless novel
- Publication date: 1919
- Publication place: Switzerland
- Pages: 63 (recto only)

The Sun (French: Le Soleil) is a wordless novel by Flemish artist Frans Masereel (1889–1972), published in 1919. In sixty-three uncaptioned woodcut prints, the book is a contemporary retelling of the Greek myth of Icarus.

Told with high-contrast black-and-white art with bold linework, the book's protagonist is a little man who leaps from the imagination of his sleeping creator. The little man repeatedly tries to find his way to the sun, climbing towers, trees, and a staircase of clouds before his success sends him plummeting back to earth—and his creator.

Masereel was the first wordless novelist, and The Sun followed on the success of Masereel's first works in the genre, 25 Images of a Man's Passion (1918) and Passionate Journey (1919). A young Lynd Ward read a copy of The Sun while studying wood engraving in Germany, and the book was an influence of the American artist making wordless novels of his own, beginning in 1929 with Gods' Man.

== Synopsis ==
An artist resembling Masereel rests his head on his desk beneath a blazing sun. From his head leaps a small male who, seeing the sun, sets out in pursuit of it, plummeting from the window in his attempt. Crowds of people try to divert him with sex and alcohol, but the little man persists in climbing trees, chimneys, church steeples, masts, and cranes. He climbs a staircase of clouds only to be burned by the sun, sending him hurtling back to the artist's desk, awakening the artist. The artist turns to the reader with a smile, tapping his head.

== Production, publication history, and legacy ==
Masereel produced 63 woodcut pages for the story. It was first published in Switzerland under the French title Le Soleil: 63 images dessinées et gravées sur bois by Éditions du Sablier in 1919, and by German publisher Kurt Wolff the following year under the title Die Sonne: 63 Holtzschinitte. The first English-language edition appeared in 1990 from English publisher Redstone under the title The Sun: A Novel Told in 63 Woodcuts.

American artist Lynd Ward read a copy of The Sun in its German edition while studying wood engraving in Germany in the late 1920s. Masereel's wordless novel and Otto Nückel's, Destiny (1926), moved Ward to create his own wordless novels, beginning in 1929 with Gods' Man.

== Style ==
Over a fifty-year career Masereel's style and themes varied little from book to book: socialist messages told with images in a symbolic, almost cartoon style. The thick-lined artwork is in high-contrast black and white, with a compositional imbalance that impresses the reader to move from one picture to the next.
