= Charles Turzak =

American artist (1899–1986)

- Born: August 8, 1899; Streator, Illinois, U.S.
- Died: January 31, 1986 (aged 86); Orlando, Florida, U.S.
- Occupation: Artist
- Years active: 1920–1985
- Notable work: Abraham Lincoln: Biography in Woodcuts

Charles Turzak (August 20, 1899 – January 31, 1986) was an American artist, known primarily for his modernist woodblock prints, particularly works depicting American historical subjects, including his best-known work Abraham Lincoln: Biography in Woodcuts (1933).

== Early life and education ==
Turzak's parents were Slovak immigrants from the parish jurisdictions of Spišská Nová Ves and Dobšiná, within a mountainous region notable for its skilled woodworkers. After the couple immigrated, Charles' father worked as a coal miner, first in Streator and later in Nokomis, Illinois, where Charles grew up. Charles was the youngest of the couple's three children and the only son. He showed an interest in and aptitude for art from an early age, drawing cartoons as well as carving small figures from peach pits and selling them. Turzak learned woodworking skills as a young apprentice to an English cabinetmaker, who was a neighbor of the family, work that included making violins.

In 1920, the year he graduated from high school, Turzak won a $100 prize in a cartoon contest sponsored by the Purina company, and he parlayed the prize into an admission into the School of the Art Institute of Chicago, much to the disappointment of his father, who had harbored hopes of his son becoming a lawyer or doctor. His excellence in school earned him admission to the art honorary fraternity Delta Phi Delta.

== Early career ==
Following school, Turzak worked as a freelance commercial artist, sold insurance, and taught printmaking. He had some success exhibiting and selling prints and watercolors, notably some of Chicago landmarks and buildings on the Northwestern University campus. In 1929, Turzak took a trip to Europe to study European art and to visit his parents' homeland of Czechoslovakia.

Turzak's return from Europe coincided with the start of the Great Depression. Turzak continued to work as an artist, illustrating books and continuing to make and selling prints of buildings in his adopted home of Chicago. Turzak was one of the first artists to participate in depression-era public art projects designed to employ out-of-work artists, such as the Section of Painting and Sculpture and the art projects of the Works Progress Administration (WPA). Turzak painted murals for the Old Chicago Main Post Office and the post office in Lemont, Illinois. He also produced a WPA-sponsored portfolio, History of Illinois in Woodcuts, in 1935.

In 1931, Turzak married Florence Cockerham, a journalism student at Northwestern University.

== Lincoln biography ==
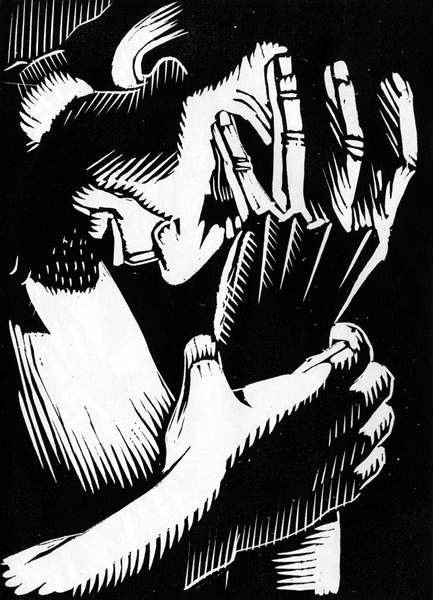
“Deliberation”, from Abraham Lincoln: Biography in Woodcuts (1933), by Charles Turzak

A World's Fair was opened in Chicago in May 1933. Formally known as A Century of Progress International Exhibition, to celebrate Chicago's centenary, the fair featured an Abraham Lincoln village featuring recreations of buildings connected to the 16th American president and favorite son of Illinois. Turzak arranged with the organizers to appear in the recreation of a general store that a young Lincoln had owned with his business partner William Berry where Turzak carved woodcuts under the eyes of visitors to the fair.

Before the fair ended in November 1934, Turzak had created 36 woodblocks illustrating key moments in the life of Lincoln. Using $50 that his wife Florence had received as a wedding present, Turzak purchased the paper necessary to create the first copies of a privately printed book collecting the woodblocks Abraham Lincoln: Biography in Woodblocks (which Turzak dedicated to his wife). Charles and Florence sold the books at the fair and the first copies sold well enough to provide the funds for Turzak to complete the full edition of 1,500 copies.

The book was composed entirely of the Turzak woodblock prints, with no additional text, the first-ever such life of a historic figure presented only in images. The book was published on high-quality paper as a slipcased octavo, priced at $3.50. Turzak's images reflected his modernist style and many of the woodblocks portrayed a clearly emotional Lincoln grappling with the personal and public crises he faced, particularly the American Civil War and the effort to end slavery. One Lincoln scholar describes the work as "visually the most modern and race-conscious imagining of the Lincoln saga up to that time" and goes on to say that it "remains the most dramatic visual treatment of the Abraham Lincoln story".

The work was popular and the entire edition of 1,500 volumes sold out. In 1960, Turzak sold the rights to the woodblock images and they were subsequently used in a number of different books, notably a 2009 Dover Publications reprint of the Turzak biography with added text, including biographical details about Lincoln and excerpts from Lincoln's speeches.

== Later work and life ==
Buoyed by the success of the Lincoln volume, Turzak went on to create additional works featuring other figures and events from American history. These include a series of ten prints, History of Illinois in Woodcuts (1934); a biography of Benjamin Franklin Benjamin Franklin: A Biography in Woodcuts (Covici-Friedi, 1935), featuring 80 woodcuts by Charles and text by his wife Florence; and a series of calendars created for Federated Hardware Mutual Insurance Company, each with 13 prints of a different American patriot, including John Adams, Thomas Jefferson, Patrick Henry, Alexander Hamilton, and John Marshall. Many of the Franklin woodcuts were featured in the Ken Burns documentary Benjamin Franklin.

Later in his career, Turzak returned to commercial art for customers including General Mills, Westinghouse, and General Electric. Turzak moved with his wife and daughter to Orlando, Florida in 1958. Turzak's fine art largely shifted from prints to painting, including more abstract works from the 1950s into the 1970s and floral and marine life subjects in the 1970s and 1980s. He continued to work in various styles and media until just before his death on January 31, 1986.

== See also ==
- Madman's Drum
