= Wild Pilgrimage =

Wordless novel by Lynd Ward

Wild Pilgrimage alternates between the protagonist's reality (in black) and fantasy (in orange).

Wild Pilgrimage is the third wordless novel of American artist Lynd Ward (1905–1985), published in 1932. It was executed in 108 monochromatic wood engravings, printed alternately in black ink when representing reality and orange to represent the protagonist's fantasies. The story tells of a factory worker who abandons his workplace to seek a free life; on his travels he witnesses a lynching, assaults a farmer's wife, educates himself with a hermit, and upon returning to the factory leads an unsuccessful workers' revolt. The protagonist finds himself battling opposing dualities such as freedom versus responsibility, the individual versus society, and love versus death.

Ward simplified his approach after the more complex, novelistic story of his previous book, Madman's Drum (1930), returning to the simplicity of his first, Gods' Man (1929). Wild Pilgrimage achieves more fluid pacing and varied imagery than the first two books, incorporating the influence of art movements such as American Regionalism and Futurism.

== Synopsis ==
A factory worker leaves his place of work to live a free life. He travels deep into the woods, where he witnesses a lynching. Deeper in the woods, he finds farm work, but it does not last long—when discovered attempting to enact his sexual fantasies on the farmer's wife, the man is forced off the farm. He finds refuge with a hermit, who allows him to stay in his cottage and teaches the man to grow fruits and vegetables. The man educates himself with the hermit's books. He finds himself in a reverie in which he and the hermit battle a slave-owning capitalist. The man returns to his former place of employment and rouses a workers' rebellion. During the fray, he fantasizes that he decapitates his employer's head; when he raises it, he discovers the head to be his own. Awakening from the fantasy, he is felled in the midst of the battle.

== Background ==
Born in Chicago, Lynd Ward (1905–1985) was a son of Methodist minister Harry F. Ward (1873–1966), a social activist and the first chairman of the American Civil Liberties Union. Throughout his career, Ward displayed in his work the influence of his father's interest in social injustice. The younger Ward was early drawn to art, and contributed art and text to high school and college newspapers.

Ward read Frans Masereel's wordless novel The Sun (1919, pictured) while studying in Germany.

After graduating from university in 1926, Ward married writer May McNeer and the couple left for an extended honeymoon in Europe. Ward spent a year studying wood engraving in Leipzig, Germany, where he encountered German Expressionist art and read the wordless novel The Sun (Note: German: Die Sonne) (1919) by Flemish woodcut artist Frans Masereel (1889–1972). Ward returned to the United States and freelanced his illustrations. In 1929, he came across German artist Otto Nückel's wordless novel Destiny (Note: German: Schicksal : eine Geschichte in Bildern) (1926) in New York City. Nückel's only work in the genre, Destiny told of the life and death of a prostitute in a style inspired by that of Masereel, but with a greater cinematic flow. The work inspired Ward to create a wordless novel of his own, Gods' Man (1929), which he followed the next year with Madman's Drum, a story with a much more complicated plot and developed characters than the first. Ward returned to the simpler, more streamlined style of the first book with Wild Pilgrimage.

== Production and publication history ==
The 108 prints for Wild Pilgrimage were larger than in Ward's previous two books; the original printing of the book itself measured 10 by 7 inches (25 cm × 18 cm). The "reality" portions are printed in black ink, and the "fantasy" segments in orange. The book saw print in November 1932, published by Harrison Smith and Robert Haas.

== Style and analysis ==
Unlike Ward's previous books, which had titles between scenes, Wild Pilgrimage provides the reader with no textual cues. In 1937 Irvin Haas called Wild Pilgrimage the book in which "Ward became a master of his medium", praising in particular the quality of the clarity and richness of the artwork.

Freedom and responsibility, individuality and society, and love and death are among the binaries the symbolic work abounds in. Cartoonist Art Spiegelman comments that Ward had mastered a fluid rhythm of pacing with his third book, achieving a flow that minimized the need for the reader to spend time deciphering images before moving to the next page, while encouraging multiple readings and interpretations. At the same time, Spiegelman writes, the images reward a closer look on rereading.

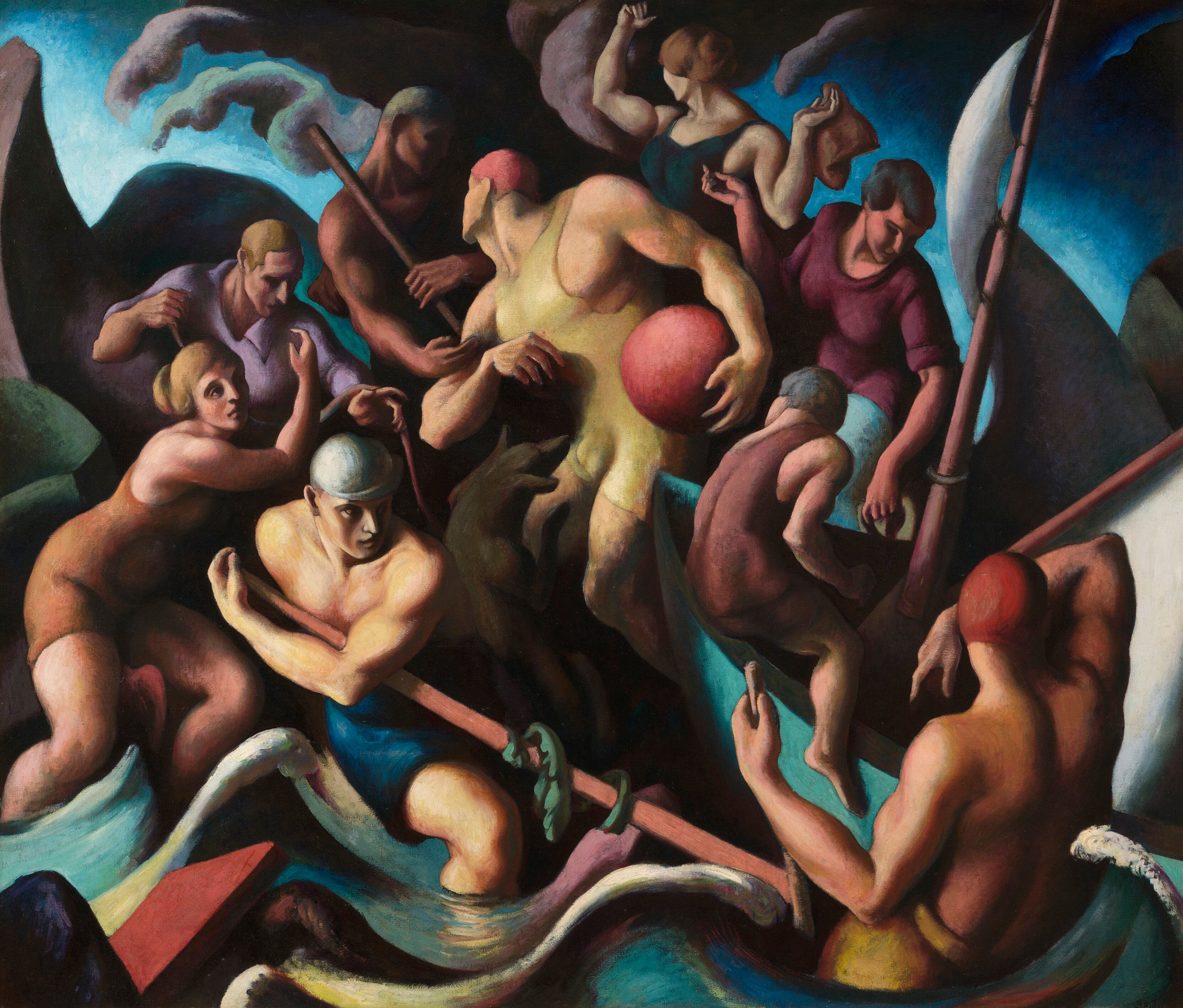
American Regionalism and other movements influenced Ward's artwork. People of Chilmark, Thomas Hart Benton, 1920

Ward's images offer a diversity of textures, moods, detail, and composition, and mix in influence from movements such as American Regionalism and Futurism. The seeming homoeroticism in the artwork drew attention, such as the prominent rear shots of the protagonist, the sort of imagery that prompted Susan Sontag to note Ward's work in her 1964 essay "Notes on 'Camp'". Writer Sarah Boxer found the prominence of such imagery distracting. Spiegelman defends the book against critics who smirk at the Ward's artwork's affinity with the "fetishistic figures and landscape" of Thomas Hart Benton and the homoerotic art of Tom of Finland, saying the book's "passion and even its off sexual subcurrents are among its strengths", and calls it "in some ways the most accessible and satisfying" of Ward's books.

== Works cited ==
- Beronä, David A. (2008). Wordless Books: The Original Graphic Novels. Abrams Books. ISBN 978-0-8109-9469-0.
- Haas, Irvin (May 1937). "A Bibliography of the Work of Lynd Ward". Prints. 7 (8). Connoisseur Publications: 84–86.
- Boxer, Sarah (2010-10-17). "America's First Wordless Novelist". Slate.
- Spiegelman, Art (2010). "Reading Pictures". In Spiegelman, Art (ed.). Lynd Ward: God's Man, Madman's Drum, Wild Pilgrimage. Library of America. pp. ix–xxv. ISBN 978-1-59853-080-3.
- Spiegelman, Art (2010). "Chronology". In Spiegelman, Art (ed.). Lynd Ward: God's Man, Madman's Drum, Wild Pilgrimage. Library of America. pp. 799–821. ISBN 978-1-59853-080-3.
- Time staff (1933-01-02). "Picture Book". Time. Vol. 21, no. 1. p. 33 – via EBSCO.
