= Clément Moreau =

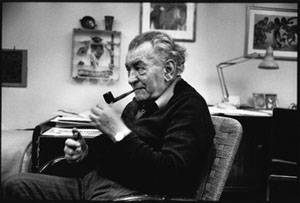
Clément Moreau

Joseph Carl Meffert (26 March 1903 in Koblenz, Germany – 27 December 1988 in Sirnach, Switzerland), better known by his nom de plume Clément Moreau, was a politically and socially conscious graphic designer and artist. His best-known work is the wordless novel Night over Germany.

== Personal life ==
Josef Carl Meffert was born out-of-wedlock in Koblenz, Germany on 26 March 1903. After a difficult childhood, he spent 1914 to 1918 in two hospitals in Westphalia.

In 1927, he moved to Berlin, where he came into contact with Käthe Kollwitz, Emil Orlik, Heinrich Vogeler, Otto Nagel and John Heartfield, among others. Thanks in part to their encouragement, Meffert produced his first graphic works, as well as book and magazine illustrations for the workers' press. A passionate relationship developed with Sonja Marchlewska, the wife of Heinrich Vogeler, who had referred the then drug addict to Käthe Kollwitz.

He went into exile in Argentina in 1935, where he worked at the Argentinisches Tageblatt newspaper.

== Bibliography ==
- Jean-Michel Palmier, Weimar in exile: the antifascist emigration in Europe and America, Verso, 2006
- Dietrich Grünewald: Bilder sprechen ohne Worte. Carl Meffert/Clement Moreau. In: Deutsche Comicforschung Jahrbuch 2011. Comic+-Verlag Sackmann und Hörndl, Hildesheim 2010, S. 64–76.
- Werner Mittenzwei: Carl Meffert/Clement Moreau. Ein Leben auf der Suche nach der Brüderlichkeit des Menschen. Henschelverlag Berlin 1977
- Dorothea Peters: Moreau, Clément. In: Neue Deutsche Biographie (NDB). Band 18, Duncker & Humblot, Berlin 1997, ISBN 3-428-00199-0, S. 94–96 (Digitalisat).
- Widerstand statt Anpassung. Deutsche Kunst im Widerstand gegen den Faschismus 1933–1945. Hrsg. vom Badischen Kunstverein, Karlsruhe, in Zusammenarbeit mit Elefanten Press, Berlin. Berlin 1980
- Hermann Schnorbach: Clement Moreaus Zeitungskarikaturen als Vorbild für Hitler-Figuren von Bertolt Brecht. In: Viktoria Hertling, Wulf Koepke, Jörg Thunecke (Hrsg.): Hitler im Visier. Literarische Satiren und Karikaturen als Waffe gegen den Nationalsozialismus. ARCO Verlag, Wuppertal 2005, S. 175–192.
- Hermann Schnorbach: Kinder flüchten vor Hitlers Weltkrieg. „Tim Tom und Mary“ - Eine Bilderfolge von Carl Meffert/Clement Moreau. Verlag Dietmar Fölbach, Koblenz 2011
- Rainer Zimmermann: Expressiver Realismus. Malerei der verschollenen Generation, Hirmer, München 1994, S. 418
