= Lynd Ward =

American novelist (1905–1985)

- 1930 self-portrait
- Born: Lynd Kendall Ward; June 26, 1905; Chicago, Illinois, U.S.
- Died: June 28, 1985 (aged 80); Reston, Virginia, U.S.
- Education: Teachers College, Columbia University; National Academy of Graphic Arts in Leipzig
- Known for: Illustration; Wordless novel
- Spouse: May McNeer

Lynd Kendall Ward (June 26, 1905 – June 28, 1985) was an American artist and novelist, known for his series of wordless novels using woodcuts, and his illustrations for juvenile and adult books. His wordless novels have influenced the development of the graphic novel. Although strongly associated with his wood engravings, he also worked in watercolor, oil, brush and ink, lithography and mezzotint. Ward was a son of Methodist minister, political organizer and radical social activist Harry F. Ward, the first chairman of the American Civil Liberties Union on its founding in 1920.

His best-known books are Gods' Man and his Caldecott-winning children's story, The Biggest Bear.

== Early life ==
Ward was born on June 26, 1905, in Chicago, Illinois. His father, Harry F. Ward, was born in Chiswick, England, in 1873; the elder Ward was a Methodist who moved to the United States in 1891 after reading the progressive Social Aspects of Christianity (1889) by Richard T. Ely. He named his son after the rural town of Lyndhurst, located in the south coastal county of Hampshire, where he had lived for two years as a teenager prior to his emigration. Ward's mother, Harriet May "Daisy" Kendall Ward, was born in Kansas City, Missouri, in 1873. The couple met at Northwestern University in Chicago, Illinois, and were married in 1899. Their first child, Gordon Hugh Ward, was born in June 1903, and a third, Muriel Ward, was born February 18, 1907.

Soon after birth, Ward developed tuberculosis; his parents took him north of Sault Ste. Marie in Canada for several months to recover. He partly recovered, and continued to suffer from symptoms of the disease throughout his childhood, as well as from inner ear and mastoid infections. In the hope of improving his health, the family moved to Oak Park, Illinois, where his father became a pastor at the Euclid Avenue Methodist Episcopal Church.

Ward was early drawn to art and decided to become an artist when his first-grade teacher told him that "Ward" spelled backward is "draw". Having skipped a grade, Ward graduated from grammar school a year early in 1918. The family moved to Englewood, New Jersey, and Ward entered Englewood High School, where he became art editor of the school newspaper and yearbook, and learned linoleum-block printing. In 1922, he graduated with honors in art, mathematics, and debate.

Ward studied fine arts at Columbia Teachers College in New York. He edited the Jester of Columbia, to which he contributed arts and crafts how-to articles. His roommate arranged a blind date for Ward and May Yonge McNeer (1902–1994) in 1923; May had been the first female undergraduate at the University of Georgia in her freshman year. The two married on June 11, 1926, shortly after their graduation, and immediately left for Europe on their honeymoon.

After four months in eastern Europe, the couple settled in Leipzig, Germany for a year, where Ward studied as a special one-year student at the National Academy of Graphic Arts and Bookmaking. (Note: German: Staatliche Akademie für graphische Kunst und Buchgewerbe) He learned etching from Alois Kolb, lithography from Georg Alexander Mathéy, and wood engraving from Hans Alexander "Theodore" Mueller; Ward was particularly influenced by Mueller. While browsing a bookstall in Leipzig, Ward chanced across two important wordless novels: Flemish artist Frans Masereel's The Sun (Note: German: Die Sonne) (1919), a story told in sixty-three woodcuts without captions, and Otto Nückel's Destiny (1926), a lead-cut narrative that is much darker and more naturalistic than Masereel's novel.

== Career ==
Ward returned to New York in September 1927 and met a number of editors who showed interest in his portfolio. In 1928, his first commissioned work illustrated Dorothy Rowe's The Begging Deer: And Other Stories of Japanese Children with eight full-page watercolor and forty-two ink and brush drawings. May have helped with background research for the illustrations, and wrote another book of Japanese folk tales, Prince Bantam (1929), with illustrations by Ward. Other work at the time included illustrations for the children's book Little Blacknose by Hildegarde Swift, and an illustrated edition of Oscar Wilde's poem "The Ballad of Reading Gaol".

In 1929, Ward was inspired to create a woodcut novel of his own. The first American wordless novel, Gods' Man, was published by Jonathan Cape & Harrison Smith that October, the week before the Wall Street Crash of 1929; over the next four years, it sold more than 20,000 copies in six editions. Ward published five more such works: Madman's Drum (1930), Wild Pilgrimage (1932), Prelude to a Million Years (1933), Song Without Words (1936), and Vertigo (1937). Around 1940, he produced roughly twenty wood engravings for another woodcut narrative, titled Hymn for the Night, but never finished the project. During the 1970s, Ward worked on an ambitious wordless novel, tentatively titled Dance of the Hours, which at his death consisted of 77 woodblocks in various stages of completion. In 2001, Rutgers University Libraries published images from 26 of the most finished blocks as Lynd Ward's Last Unfinished Wordless Novel.

In addition to woodcuts, Ward also worked in watercolor, oil, brush and ink, lithography and mezzotint. He illustrated over a hundred children's books, several of which were collaborations with his wife, May. During the 1930s, Ward became well known for the political themes of his graphic work, which often addressed class and labor issues. In 1932 he founded Equinox Cooperative Press as a response to the mechanized routines of the modern publishing business. Each of the sixteen books eventually published by the press was custom designed and printed. Every facet of the book, such as the paper, type fonts and vignettes, grew out of the collaborative decisions of a small group of writers, artists and editors, and represented an affirmation of handwork. While running Equinox, Ward also took on leadership roles in the Artists Union, the American Artists Congress and the Federal Arts Project of the Works Project Administration (WPA). In 1939, Ward became supervisor of the Graphic Arts Division of the New York Chapter of the Federal Arts Project. He managed 300 artists who made 5,000 prints a year, which were distributed for display to libraries, museums, post offices and schools. During World War II, Ward worked for the Bendix Corporation in New Jersey assembling gyroscopes for aircraft. He was named a member of the National Academy of Design in 1947. He was also a member of the Society of Illustrators and a member and President of the Society of American Graphic Artists (SAGA).

Ward moved to Leonia, New Jersey, in 1943, where he used a barn as a studio. He and his wife lived in Leonia for the next fifteen years. Beginning in 1958, Ward lived with his wife in a home in Cresskill, New Jersey, to which they added a studio for their work.

== Death ==
Ward retired to his home in Reston, Virginia, in 1979. He died on June 28, 1985, of Alzheimer's disease, two days after his 80th birthday.

== Documentary ==
In celebration of the art and life of this American printmaker and illustrator, independent filmmaker Michael Maglaras of 217 Films produced a film titled O Brother Man: The Art and Life of Lynd Ward. The documentary features an interview with the artist's daughter Robin Ward Savage, as well as more than 150 works from all periods of Ward's career. The 94-minute documentary, culled from over seven hours of film and narrated by Maglaras, premiered at Penn State University Library's, Foster Auditorium, on April 20, 2012, where it was warmly received. Penn State's Special Collections Library has also become the repository for much Lynd Ward material, and may continue to receive material from Ward family collections.

== Awards ==
He won a number of awards, including the Joseph Pennel Award at the Library of Congress in 1948 for wood engraving, the Caldecott Medal for The Biggest Bear in 1953 (with a runner-up for America's Ethan Allen in 1950), and a Rutgers University award for Distinguished Contribution to Children's Literature. He also illustrated two Newbery Medal books and six runners-up. In 2011, Ward was listed as a Judges' Choice for The Will Eisner Award Hall of Fame.

== Novels in woodcuts ==
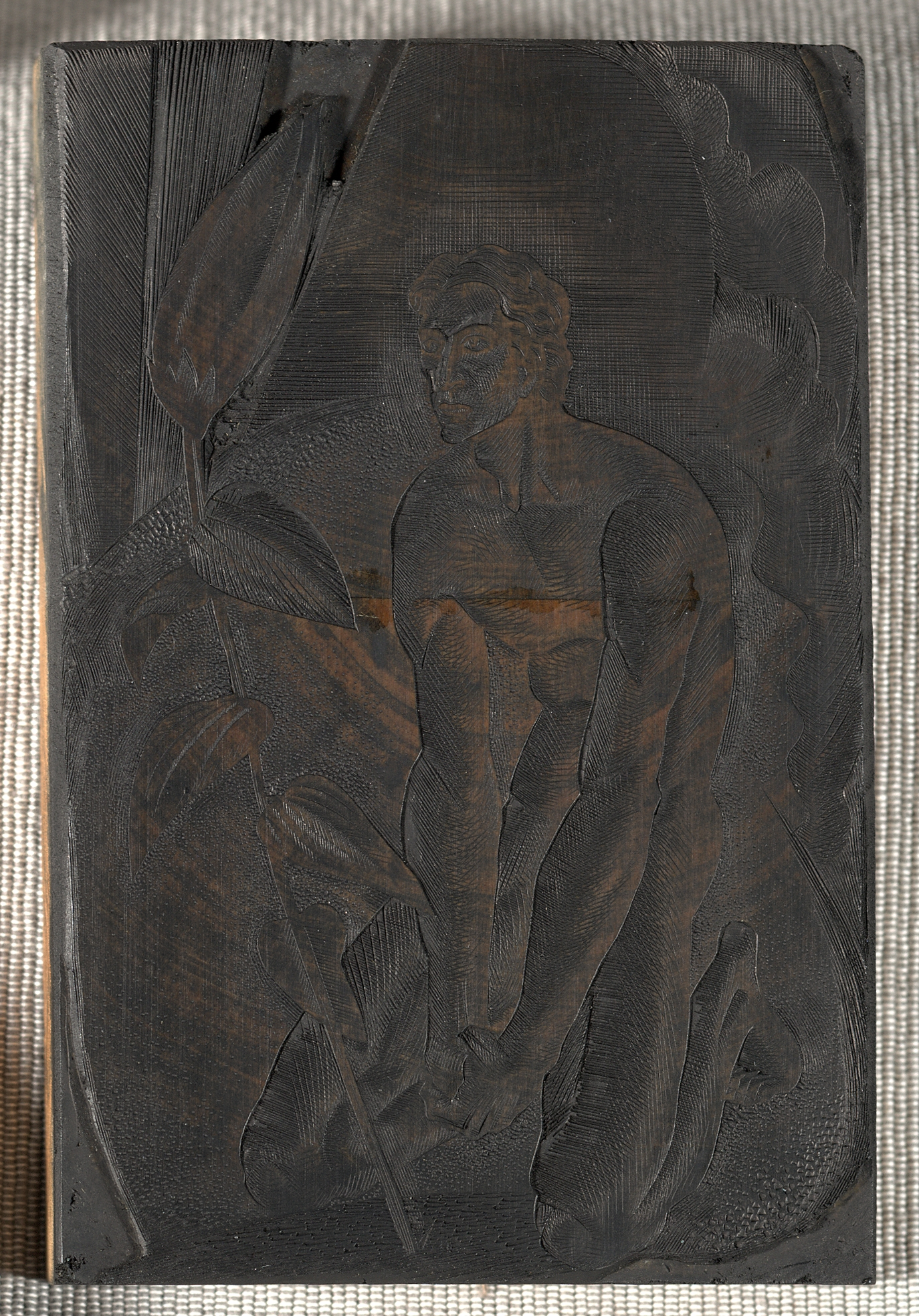
A wood block engraved by Lynd Ward for plate #29 of his Prelude to a Million Years

Ward is known for his wordless novels told entirely through dramatic wood engravings. Ward's first work, Gods' Man (1929), uses a blend of Art Deco and Expressionist styles to tell the story of an artist's struggle with his craft, his seduction and subsequent abuse by money and power, his escape to innocence, and his unavoidable doom. Ward, in employing the concept of the wordless pictorial narrative, acknowledged as his predecessors the European artists Frans Masereel and Otto Nückel. Released the week of the 1929 stock market crash, Gods' Man would continue to exert influence well beyond the Depression era, becoming an important source of inspiration for Beat Generation poet Allen Ginsberg.

Ward produced six wood engraving novels over the next eight years, including:

- Gods' Man (1929)
- Madman's Drum (1930)
- Wild Pilgrimage (1932)
- Prelude to a Million Years (1933)
- Song Without Words (1936)
- Vertigo (1937)

Ward left two additional fragments, the unpublished Hymn for the Night (c. 1940), and Lynd Ward's Last, Unfinished, Wordless Novel, which was published posthumously in 2001.

== Other works ==
Beowulf wrestles with Grendel by Lynd Ward (1933)

In 1930 and 1931, Ward created a series of striking wood-engraved illustrations for Alec Waugh's pair of travel books, Hot Countries and Most Women, and in the following year a number of line-cut chapter headings and a provocative dust-jacket image that embodied the homoerotic themes of Myron Brinig's satirical novel, The Flutter of an Eyelid. In 1934, he executed illustrations and vignettes for a new edition of Mary Shelley's Frankenstein which were influenced by James Whale’s famous 1931 film starring Boris Karloff. In the late thirties and early forties, he produced color illustrations for three classic novels brought out by the Heritage Press: Les Misérables (1938), Beowulf (1939) and The Count of Monte Cristo (1941). In 1942, Ward illustrated the children's book The Little Red Lighthouse and the Great Gray Bridge, with text by Hildegarde Swift. His work on children's books also included his 1953 Caldecott Medal winning book The Biggest Bear, Nic of the Woods (1965), which he wrote and illustrated, and his work on Esther Forbes' Johnny Tremain (1943). He also produced a wordless story for children, The Silver Pony (1973), which is told entirely in black, white and gray painted illustrations.

Ward's work included an awareness of the racial injustice in the United States. This is apparent in scenes representing the slave trade in Madman’s Drum (1930) and in several woodcuts that depict lynchings in Wild Pilgrimage (1932). It appears again in his drawings for North Star Shining: A Pictorial History of the American Negro, by Hildegarde Hoyt Swift (1947). Ward features African American as well as various Native American characters in his book, The Silver Pony.

Ward also illustrated Little Baptiste (1954), My Friend Mac (1960) and The Wolf of Lambs Lane (1967), which were all written by his wife, May McNeer.

During the 1960s and early 70s, Ward executed nearly forty independent prints which he issued in unlimited editions. These beautifully made engravings focus on rural scenes celebrating the fertility of nature, the joy of children as they explore the outdoors, and political allegories like Two Men Waiting (1966), Mars, Venus and Snare (1968) and Victim (1970). Engravings that treat the freedom of exploration, such as Man Climbing (1959) and Pathfinder (1971), are counterbalanced by those that portray human beings surrounded by dense woods or imprisoned in cages, as in Net (1962), Caged Uncaged (1965) and Prisoner (1974). Perhaps sensing the hypnotic spell cast by the increasingly precise and textured line-work of his prints, Ward returned to his earlier sequential art in his last, unfinished novel.

In 1974, Harry N. Abrams published Storyteller Without Words, a book that included Ward's six novels, selections of his illustrations from other books and a number of his independent prints. In this edition, Ward broke his silence and wrote brief introductions for each of his six novels. In 2010, the Library of America published Lynd Ward: Six Novels in Woodcuts, with a new chronology of Ward's life and an introduction by Art Spiegelman.

== Influence ==
Ward's work had an important influence on the work of later graphic artists such as Art Spiegelman, George Walker, Clifford Harper, Eric Drooker, Jarrett Heckbert, Steven McCabe and Megan Speers. His works have been praised by R. Crumb, filmmaker Guillermo Del Toro, and Alan Moore.

Since 2011, Ward has been honored and his name has been attached to the prestigious annual Lynd Ward Graphic Novel Prize, which is sponsored by Penn State University Libraries and administered by the Pennsylvania Center for the Book, an affiliate of the Center for the Book at the US Library of Congress. The Lynd Ward Prize is given in recognition of the best graphic novel or comic book, fiction or nonfiction, published in the previous calendar year by a living US or Canadian citizen or resident.

== Lynd Ward Prize winners and nominees ==
Source: Pennsylvania Center for the Book

Year	Title	Authors	Publisher	Result
2011	Duncan the Wonder Dog	Adam Hines	AdHouse	Winner
2011	Set to Sea	Drew Weing	Fantagraphics	Honor
2012	Big Questions	Anders Nilsen	Drawn & Quarterly	Winner
2012	Freeway	Mark Kalesniko	Fantagraphics	Honor
2012	Habibi	Craig Thompson	Pantheon	Honor
2012	Life with Mr. Dangerous	Paul Hornscheumeier	Villard	Honor
2012	Zahra's Paradise	Amir and Khalil	First Second	Honor
2013	Building Stories	Chris Ware	Pantheon	Winner
2013	Heads or Tails	Lilli Carré	Fantagraphics	Honor
2013	The Understanding Monster: Book One	Theo Ellsworth	Secret Acres	Honor
2014	Fran	Jim Woodring	Fantagraphics	Winner
2014	Boxers & Saints	Gene Luen Yang	First Second	Honor
2014	Heck	Zander Cannon	Top Shelf	Honor
2015	This One Summer	Mariko Tamaki and Jillian Tamaki	First Second	Winner
2015	Here	Richard McGuire	Pantheon	Honor
2016	Unflattening	Nick Sousanis	Harvard University Press	Winner
2016	Displacement: A Travelogue	Lucy Knisley	Fantagraphics	Honor
2016	Russian Olive to Red King	Kathryn Immonen & Stuart Immonen	AdHouse	Honor
2017	Rolling Blackouts: Dispatches from Turkey, Syria and Iraq	Sarah Glidden	Drawn & Quarterly	Winner
2017	Cousin Joseph	Jules Feiffer	Livewright Publishing	Honor
2017	Hot Dog Taste Test	Lisa Hanawalt	Drawn & Quarterly	Honor
2018				Winner
2018				Honor
2019				Winner
2019				Honor
2020				Winner
2020				Honor
2021				Winner
2021				Honor
2022				Winner
2022				Honor
2023				Winner
2023				Honor
2024				Winner
2024				Honor
2025				Winner
2025				Honor

== Works cited ==
- Cohen, Martin S. (April 1977). "The Novel in Woodcuts: A Handbook". Journal of Modern Literature. 6 (2): 171–195. JSTOR 3831165.
- Dance, Robert (2015). Illustrated By Lynd Ward. The Grolier Club.
- Link, Eugene P. (1984). Labor-Religion Prophet: The Times and Life of Harry F. Ward. Westview Press.
- Scott, Grant F. (2022). Lynd Ward's Wordless Novels, 1929-1937: Visual Narrative, Cultural Politics, Homoeroticism. Routledge.
- Spiegelman, Art (2010). "Chronology". In Spiegelman, Art (ed.). Lynd Ward: God's Man, Madman's Drum, Wild Pilgrimage. Library of America. pp. 799–833. ISBN 978-1-59853-080-3.
