= The Biggest Bear =

Book by Lynd Ward

- Front cover, designed by Lynd Ward
- Author: Lynd Ward
- Illustrator: Lynd Ward
- Genre: Children's book
- Published: 1952 by Houghton Mifflin Harcourt
- Publication place: United States

The Biggest Bear is a children's picture book by Lynd Ward, first published in 1952. It was illustrated using casein paint, and won the Caldecott Medal for illustration in 1953.

== Background ==
The Biggest Bear was the first children's picture book for which Ward was both author and illustrator. He rendered the illustrations in casein paint.

Ward set the story in the backwoods of Northern Ontario, an area he was familiar with as his parents had taken him to Sault Ste. Marie when he was a boy so he could recover from tuberculosis. Thereafter the family summered at a lake near Echo Bay, not far from the US–Canada border.

== Plot ==
Johnny Orchard, a young boy, is jealous because his neighbors have bear pelts hanging on their barns, so he takes a rifle and goes hunting for the biggest bear in the valley. However, when he finds only a male bear cub, he befriends him by feeding him maple sugar and brings the bear home as a pet. As he grows, the bear becomes a nuisance to Johnny's family and the neighbors due to his enormous appetite. After the neighbors complain to his father, he tells Johnny the bear has to go back to the woods. Johnny tries three times to return the bear to the woods. Each time the bear follows Johnny back home. Finally, Johnny and his father decide the only way to solve the problem is to shoot the bear. Johnny takes the bear far into the woods, but while loading his rifle, the bear runs off and into a live trap that has maple sugar in it. Men who had set the trap to capture animals for the zoo soon come. They take Johnny's bear to a zoo where Johnny can visit him anytime he wants to.

== Freudian analysis of this book ==
In The Denial of Death, Ernest Becker cited The Biggest Bear as an example of how the innate human fear can become manifested in literature.

Awards
Preceded by Finders Keepers	Caldecott Medal recipient 1953	Succeeded by Madeline's Rescue
