= István Szegedi Szüts =

Self-portrait at 50 years

1916 Pencil sketch of Gwynedd Jones-Parry on Cornish beach by Alfred Munnings

István Szegedi Szűts (7 December 1893 in Budapest – 1959) was a Hungarian painter and illustrator, a friend of the composers Béla Bartók, Zoltán Kodály and György Ránki. He served in World War I and his books include 'My War' and 'Last Letters from Stalingrad'. 'My War', two volumes of pen, ink and wash drawings, published in 1931 by John Lane, is a wordless novel of his wartime experiences. His economy of line has been compared with that of Eric Gill and Keith Vaughan.

He visited England in 1929, holding a solo exhibition at the Gieves Gallery in London. In 1936 he moved to Cornwall with Gwynedd Jones-Parry, another painter, whom he married in 1937. One of their wedding presents was Alfred Wallis' 'Three Sailing Vessels on a River' given by Jim Ede, who was a junior curator at the Tate and purchased many of Wallis' paintings.

The couple lived at Caunce Head near Mullion, Cornwall on the Lizard Peninsula and stayed there for the rest of their lives. He exhibited with the Newlyn Society of Artists and the Penwith Society of Arts.

The mere fact that Mr Campbell Dodgson, the distinguished Keeper of Prints and Drawings at the British Museum, acts as sponsor to Mr István Szegedi-Szüts, is sufficient guarantee for the merit of the work shown by that young Hungarian artist at the Gieves Gallery in Bond Street. They seem, almost without exception, to be the work of inspired moments, in which the true significance of a scene, a type or movement is revealed to the artist in a flash and transferred to paper with a few vigorous strokes or accents. They are akin to Mr Paul Nash's memorable war drawings in intensity of realisation and simplicity of statement. Mr Szegedi-Szüts does not appear to belong to any particular group. His art bears no marked national characteristics, although it is inspired by profound sympathy with national characteristic life and scenery. His gifts of synthesis and swift notation are akin to Vaszary's, but unlike the older artist he has remained unaffected by Parisian influences.

— Daily Mail 1929

== Wordless Novels ==
- My War. London Bodley Head; 1931
- My War. NY William Morrow & Co.; 1932
