= Addie and Hermy =

British comic strip

- Comic strip character(s) from The Dandy

Publication information
- Stars in: Addie and Hermy
- Other names: Addie and Hermy - The Nasty Nazis
- Creator(s): Sam Fair
- First appearance: Issue XXXX (1939)
- Last appearance: 1941
- Also appeared in: The Dandy Annual
- Current status: Discontinued

Main Character
- Name: Adolf Hitler and Hermann Göring

Characters
- Type of group: Nazi
- Regular characters: Other nameless Nazis followers

Addie and Hermy - The Nasty Nazis was a British comic strip series created by Sam Fair, which appeared in the magazine The Dandy from 1939 until 1941. It was published by the Dundee-based publishing-firm DC Thomson and Co.

The comic strip starred caricatures of Adolf Hitler and Hermann Göring, using typical German stereotypes and speech to portray the characters. The BBC states that they were 'usually embroiled in a scam that went wrong'. It was part of the British war time propaganda during World War II. A similar comic by the same publishing firm poked fun at Benito Mussolini and was called Musso the Wop.
