= Wordless novel =

Sequences of pictures used to tell a story

Wordless novels flourished in Germany in the 1920s and typically were made using woodcut or similar techniques in an Expressionist style. (Frans Masereel, 25 Images of a Man's Passion, 1918)

The wordless novel is a narrative genre that uses sequences of captionless pictures to tell a story. As artists have often made such books using woodcut and other relief printing techniques, the terms woodcut novel or novel in woodcuts are also used. The genre flourished primarily in the 1920s and 1930s and was most popular in Germany.

The wordless novel has its origin in the German Expressionist movement of the early 20th century. The typically socialist work drew inspiration from medieval woodcuts and used the awkward look of that medium to express angst and frustration at social injustice. The first such book was the Belgian Frans Masereel's 25 Images of a Man's Passion, published in 1918. The German Otto Nückel and other artists followed Masereel's example. Lynd Ward brought the genre to the United States in 1929 when he produced Gods' Man, which inspired other American wordless novels and a parody in 1930 by cartoonist Milt Gross with He Done Her Wrong. Following an early-1930s peak in production and popularity, the genre waned in the face of competition from sound films and anti-socialist censorship in Nazi Germany and the US.

Following World War II, new examples of wordless novels became increasingly rare, and early works went out of print. Interest began to revive in the 1960s when the American comics fandom subculture came to see wordless novels as prototypical book-length comics. In the 1970s, the example of the wordless novel inspired cartoonists such as Will Eisner and Art Spiegelman to create book-length non-genre comics—"graphic novels". Cartoonists such as Eric Drooker and Peter Kuper took direct inspiration from wordless novels to create wordless graphic novels.

== Characteristics ==
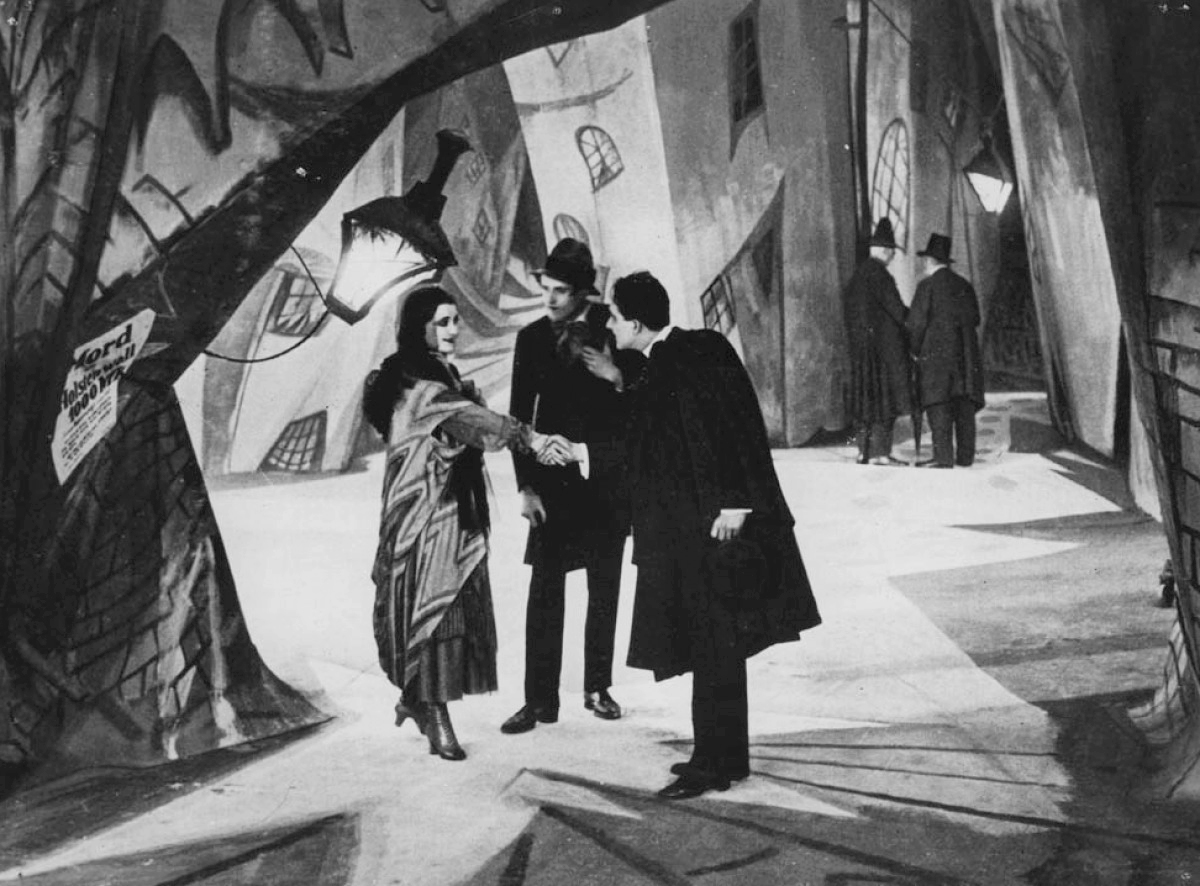
Expressionist film and graphics inspired early wordless novels. (The Cabinet of Dr. Caligari, 1920)

Wordless novels use sequences of expressive images to tell a story. Socialist themes of struggle against capitalism are common; scholar Perry Willett calls these themes "a unifying element of the genre's aesthetic". In both formal and moral aspects, they draw from Expressionist graphics, theatre, and film. Wordless novelists such as Frans Masereel appropriated the awkward aesthetic of mediaeval woodcuts to express their anguish and revolutionary political ideas and used simple, traditional iconography. Text is restricted to title and chapter pages, except where text is a part of the scene, such as in signs.

The storytelling tends to be melodramatic, and the stories tend to focus on struggles against social oppression in which characters are silenced by economic, political, and other social forces. The characters are clearly delineated as good or evil—the good drawn sympathetically and the evil with the contempt of the artist's moral indignation.

Most wordless novelists were not prolific; few besides Masereel and Lynd Ward produced more than a single book. The books were designed to be mass-produced for a popular audience, in contrast to similar but shorter portfolios by artists such as Otto Dix, George Grosz, and Käthe Kollwitz, which were produced in limited editions for collectors. These portfolios of typically from eight to ten prints also were meant to be viewed in sequence. Wordless novels were longer, had more complex narratives, and were printed in sizes and dimensions comparable to those of novels. A large influence was the most popular silent visual medium of the time: silent films. Panning, zooming, slapstick, and other filmic techniques are found in the books; Ward said that in creating a wordless novel, he first had to visualize it in his head as a silent film.

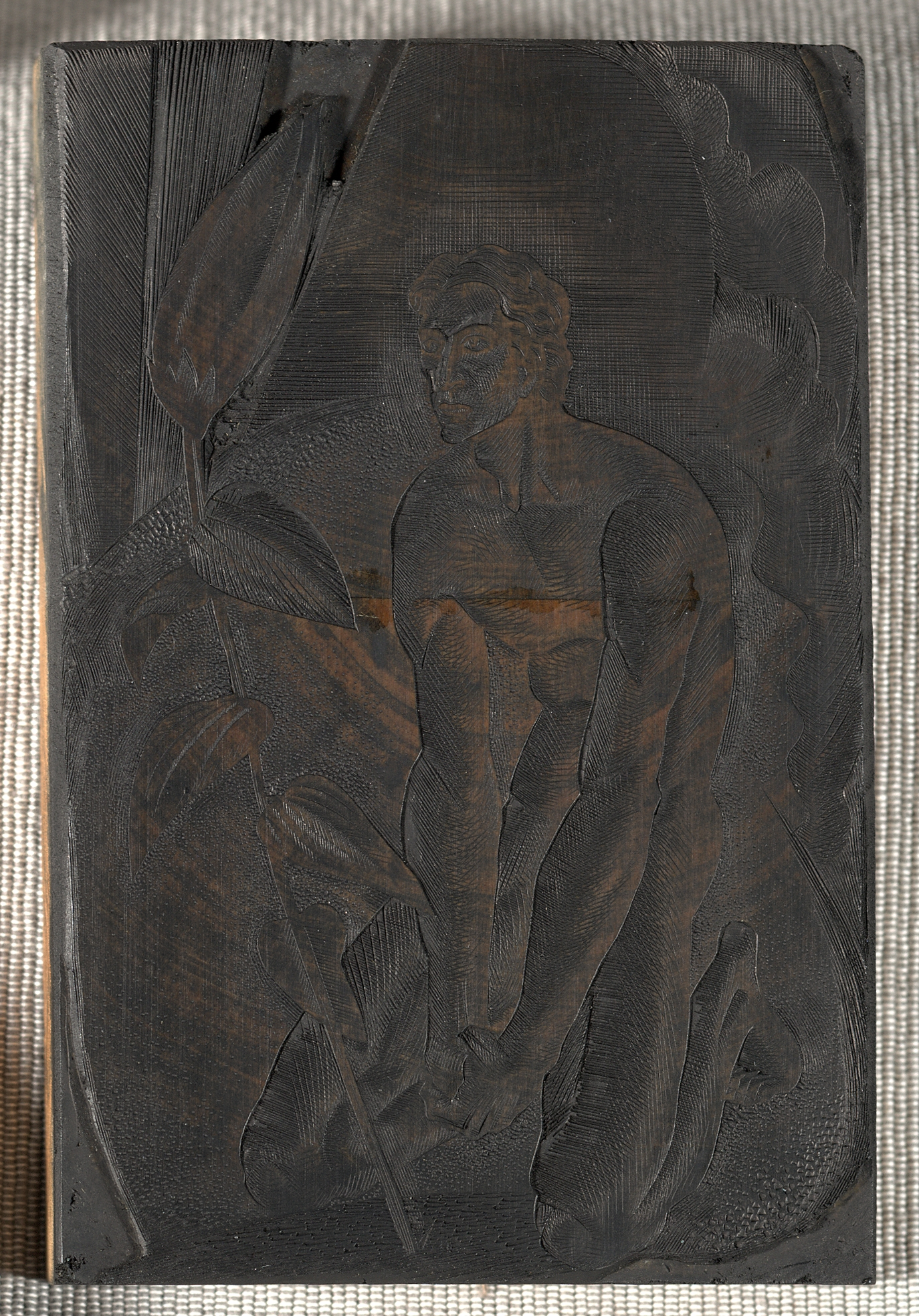
Wordless novelists favoured relief printing such as in this wood engraving from Ward's Prelude to a Million Years (1933).

Typically, wordless novels used relief printing techniques such as woodcuts, wood engraving, metalcuts, or linocuts. One of the oldest printing techniques, relief printing has its origins in 8th-century China and was introduced to Europe in the 15th century. It requires an artist to draw or transfer an image to a printing block; the areas not to be printed (the white areas) are cut away, leaving raised areas to which ink is applied to make prints. The monochrome prints were usually in black ink, and occasionally in a different colour such as sienna or orange. Relief printing is an inexpensive but labour-intensive printing technique; it was accessible to socially conscious artists who wanted to tell wordless stories of the working classes.

== History ==
In 15th-century medieval Europe, woodcut block books were printed as religious guides; particularly popular was the Ars moriendi. The early 16th century saw block books disappear in favour of books printed with the movable type of Gutenberg's presses. Woodcut printing persisted into the 16th century under artists such as Dürer, Holbein, and Amman, after which engraving techniques superseded woodcuts. Pioneered by Thomas Bewick, wood engraving enjoyed popularity beginning in the 18th century, until the method gave way by the 19th century to more advanced printing methods such as lithography.

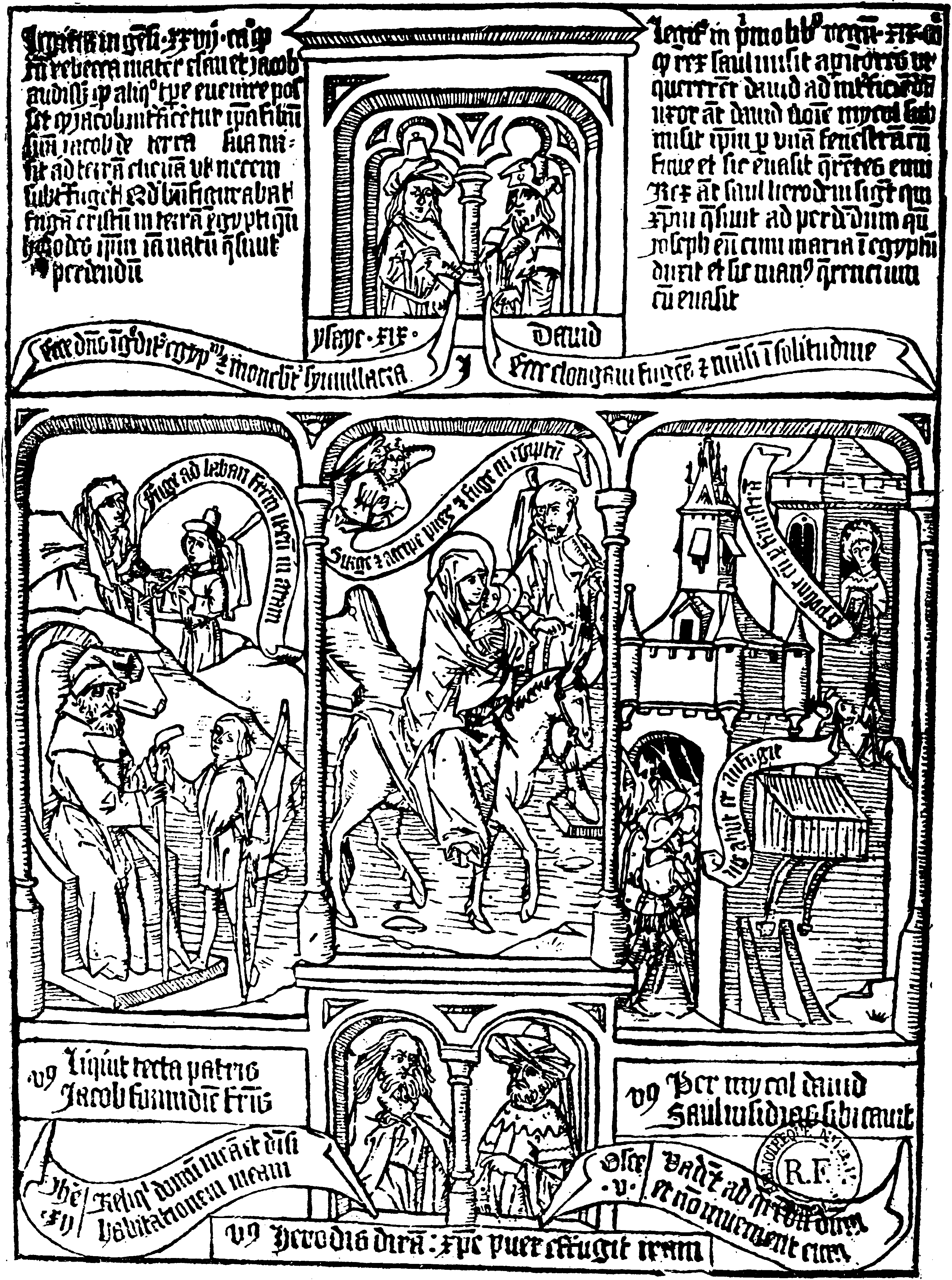
Expressionist woodcut artists expressed angst using the look of medieval woodcuts such as this Biblia pauperum.

Post-impressionist artist Paul Gauguin revived woodcut printing in the late-19th century, favouring it for its primitivist effect. Early in the 20th century, woodcut artists such as Käthe Kollwitz (1867–1945) and Max Klinger (1857–1920) published portfolios of woodcuts, thematically linked by themes of social injustice. Expressionist graphic artists such as Max Beckmann (1884–1950), Otto Dix (1891–1969), Kollwitz, and Karl Schmidt-Rottluff (1884–1976) were inspired by an early-20th-century revival of interest in medieval graphic arts—in particular Biblical woodcut prints such as the Biblia pauperum. These artists used the awkward look of woodcut images to express feelings of anguish.

=== In Europe ===
The wordless novel grew out of the Expressionist movement. The Belgian Frans Masereel (1889–1972) created the earliest example, 25 Images of a Man's Passion, (Note: French: 25 images de la passion d'un homme) in 1918. It was a commercial success and was followed by Passionate Journey, (Note: French: Mon livre d'heures; the book was translated into English as My Book of Hours (1919),) which at 167 images was Masereel's longest book. It was also the most commercially successful, particularly in Germany, where copies of his books sold in the hundreds of thousands throughout the 1920s and had introductions by writers such as Max Brod, Hermann Hesse, and Thomas Mann. Masereel's books drew strongly on Expressionist theatre and film in their exaggerated but representational artwork with strong contrasts of black and white.

Masereel's commercial success led other artists to try their hands at the genre; themes of oppression under capitalism were prominent, a pattern set early by Masereel. At age thirteen, Polish-French artist Balthus drew a wordless story about his cat; it was published in 1921 with an introduction by poet Rainer Maria Rilke. In Destiny (1926), (Note: German: Schicksal) Otto Nückel (1888–1955) produced a work with greater nuance and atmosphere than Masereel's bombastic works; where Masereel told tales of Man's struggle against Society, Nückel told of the life of an individual woman. Destiny appeared in a US edition in 1930 and sold well there.

Clément Moreau (1903–1988) first tried his hand at the genre with the six-plate Youth Without Means (Note: German: Erwerbslose Jugend) in 1928. István Szegedi-Szüts (1892–1959), a Hungarian immigrant to England, made a wordless book in brush and ink called My War (1931). In simple artwork reminiscent of Japanese brush painting, Szegedi-Szüts told of a Hungarian cavalryman disillusioned by his World War I experiences. Helena Bochořáková-Dittrichová (1894–1980) was the first woman to produce a wordless novel, Z Mého Dětství (1929); later republished in French as Enfance (1930) and later republished in English as Childhood (1931),. Childhood represented middle-class life, rather than the working-class struggle found in the works of Masereel or Nückel. Bochořáková described her books as "cycles" rather than novels. Surrealist artist Max Ernst made the silent collage novel Une semaine de bonté in 1934. Following World War II, Werner Gothein (1890–1968), a member of the German Expressionist group Die Brücke, produced The Tightrope Walker and the Clown (Note: German: Die Seiltänzerin und ihr Clown) (1949).

=== In North America ===
In 1926, the American Lynd Ward (1905–1985) moved to Leipzig to study graphic arts; while there, he discovered the works of Masereel and Otto Nückel. He produced six such works of his own; he preferred to call them "pictorial narratives". The first, Gods' Man (1929), was his most popular. Ward used wood engraving rather than woodcutting and varied image sizes from page to page. Gods' Man sold 20,000 copies, and other American artists followed up on this success with their own wordless novels in the 1930s.

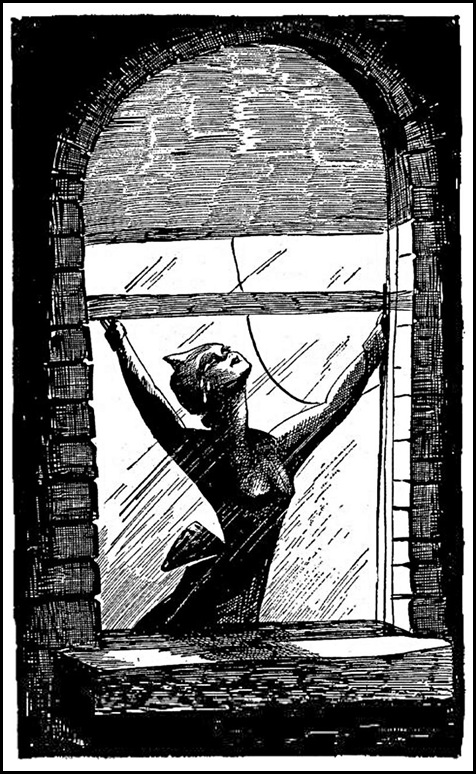
In He Done Her Wrong (1930), Milt Gross parodied Lynd Ward's Gods' Man (1929).

Cartoonist Milt Gross's He Done Her Wrong (1930) was a parody of the genre; the book uses varying panel designs akin to those of comics: the action sometimes takes place outside the panel borders and "dialogue balloons" show in images what the characters are saying. Cartoonist and illustrator William Gropper's Alay-oop (1930) tells of three entertainers' disappointed dreams. In Abraham Lincoln: Biography in Woodcuts (1933) Charles Turzak documented the American president. Animator Myron Waldman (1908–2006) wrote a wordless tale of a plump young woman looking for a glamorous husband. The book, Eve (1943), also uses "picture balloons" as He Done Her Wrong does.

Inspired by mediaeval religious block books and working in an Art Deco style, American illustrator James Reid (1907–1989) produced one wordless novel, The Life of Christ (1930); due to the book's religious content, the Soviet Union barred its importation under its policies on religion.

In 1938, Italian-American Giacomo Patri (1898–1978) produced his only wordless novel, the linocut White Collar. It chronicles the aftermath of the 1929 stock market crash and was intended to motivate white-collar workers to unionize. It also deals with controversial topics such as abortion, accessibility of health care for the poor, and loss of Christian faith. From 1948 to 1951, Canadian Laurence Hyde (1914–1987) produced his single wordless novel, the woodcut Southern Cross, in response to the American atomic tests in the Bikini Atoll. The work tells of an American evacuation of an island for nuclear tests, where one family is left behind. Polish-American Si Lewen's (1918– ) first book, The Parade: A Story in 55 Drawings (1957), won praise from Albert Einstein for its anti-war message. Canadian George Kuthan's Aphrodite's Cup (1964) is an erotic book drawn in an ancient Greek style. In the early 21st century, Canadian George Walker made wordless woodcut novels, beginning with Book of Hours (2010), about the lives of those in the World Trade Center complex just before the September 11 attacks.

=== Decline ===
The popularity of wordless novels peaked around 1929 to 1931, when "talkies" were introduced and began to supersede silent films. In the 1930s the Nazis in Germany suppressed and detained many printmakers and banned Masereel's works as "degenerate art". Following World War II, US censors suppressed books with socialist views, including the works of Lynd Ward, on whom the FBI kept files over his socialist sympathies; this censorship has made early editions of wordless novels scarce collector's items in the US.

By the 1940s, most artists had given up on the genre. The most devoted practitioners, Masereel and Ward, moved on to other work for which they became better known; Masereel's obituary did not even mention his wordless novels. Many wordless novels remained out of print until the rise of the graphic novel revived interest amongst readers and publishers in the early 21st century.

== Relation to comics and graphic novels ==
"... Ward's roots were not in comics, though his work is part of the same large family tree ..."

— Art Spiegelman, The Paris Review, 2010

There have been sporadic examples of textless comics (see Pantomime comics) throughout the medium's history. In the US, there were comic strips such as Otto Soglow's The Little King, begun in 1931, and Carl Anderson's Henry, begun in 1932. German cartoonist E. O. Plauen's wordless domestic comic strip Father and Son (Note: German: Vater und Sohn) (1934–37) was popular in Germany, and was collected in three volumes. Antonio Prohías's textless Mad magazine feature Spy vs. Spy began in 1961.

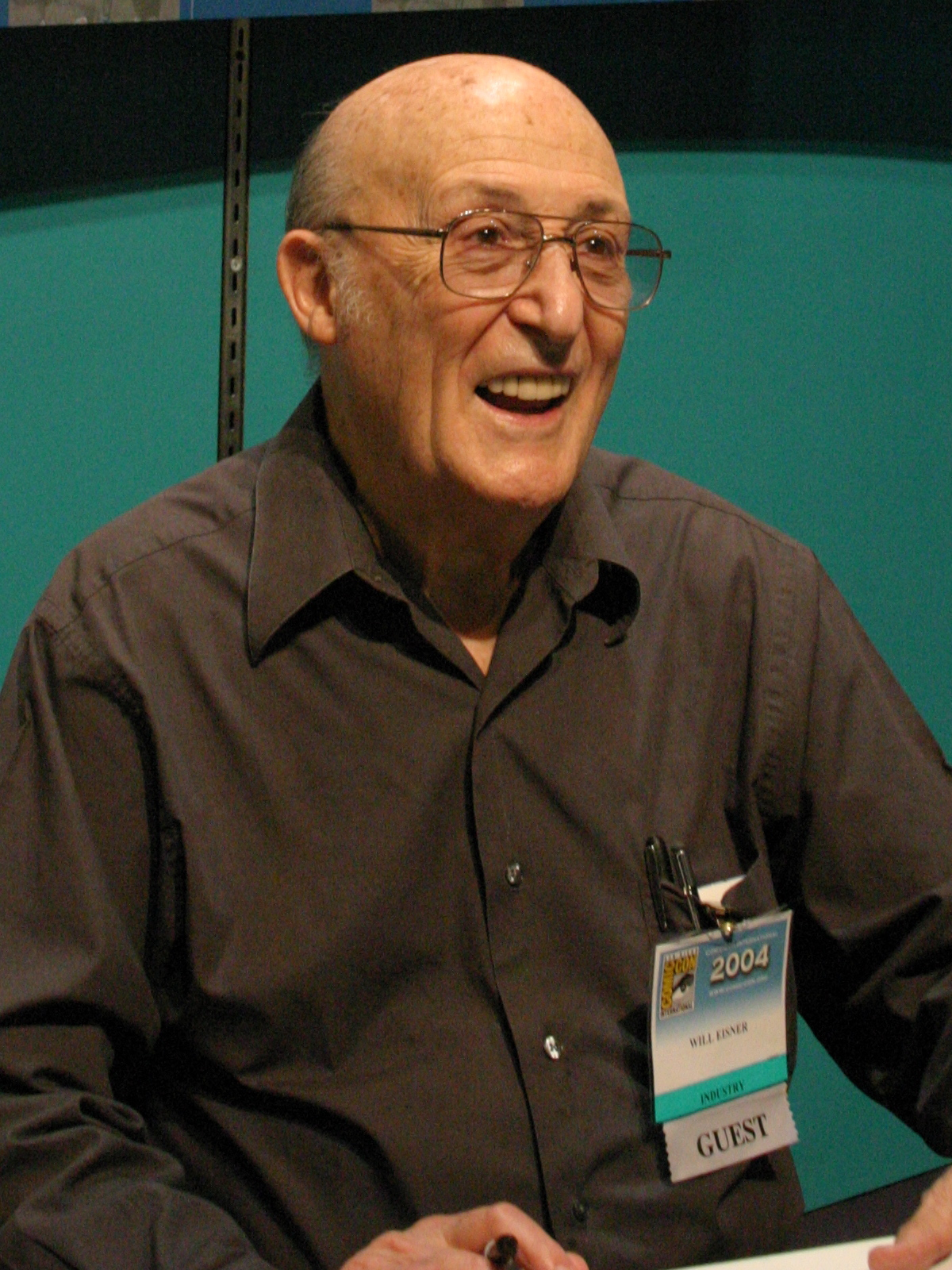
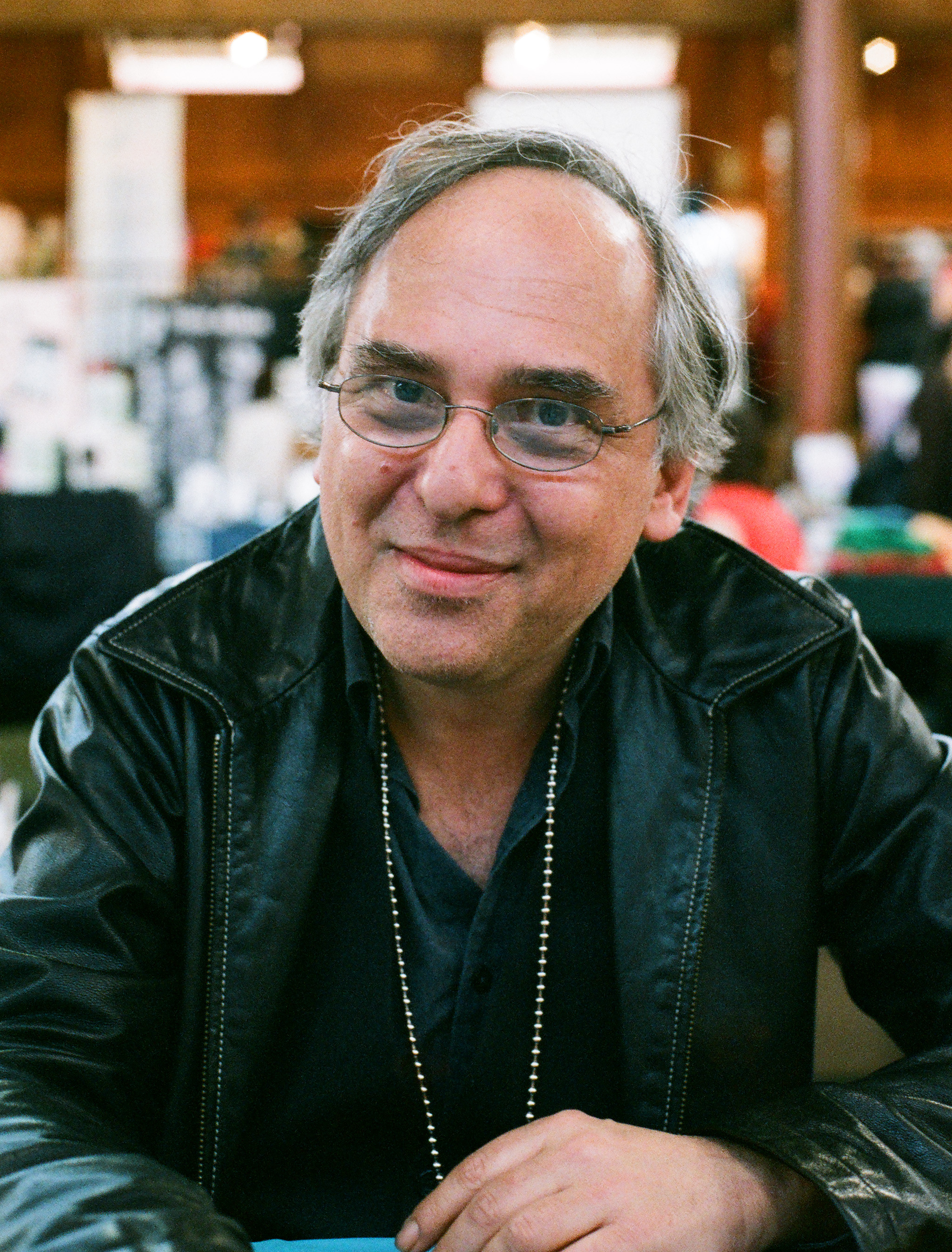
Lynd Ward's work inspired cartoonists Will Eisner (left) and Art Spiegelman (right) to create graphic novels.

Cartoonist Will Eisner (1917–2005) first came upon the work of Lynd Ward in 1938. Eisner was an early pioneer in the American comic book industry and saw in Ward's work a greater potential for comics. Eisner's ambitions were rebuffed by his peers, who saw comics as no more than low-status entertainment. Eisner withdrew from the commercial comics industry in the early 1950s to do government and educational work. He returned in the 1970s when the atmosphere had changed and his readers and peers seemed more receptive to his ambitions. In 1978, he began a career of creating book-length comics, the first of which was A Contract with God; the book was marketed as a "graphic novel", a term that became standard towards the end of the 20th century. Eisner called Ward "perhaps the most provocative graphic storyteller" of the 20th century. He wrote that Ward's Vertigo (1937) required considerable investment from readers in order to fill in the story between images.

Interest in the wordless novel revived with the rise of the graphic novel. Comics fans discussed the works of Masereel and others in fanzines, and the discussions turned to talk of the Great American Novel being made in comics. These discussions inspired cartoonist Art Spiegelman (b. 1948), who in 1973 made a four-page strip, "Prisoner on the Hell Planet", in an Expressionist style inspired by Ward's work. Spiegelman later incorporated the strip into his graphic novel Maus (1992).

While graphic novels generally use captions and dialogue, cartoonists such as Eric Drooker, Peter Kuper, Thomas Ott, Brian Ralph, Masashi Tanaka, Lewis Trondheim, and Billy Simms have made wordless graphic novels. As Gross did in He Done Her Wrong, Hendrik Dorgathen's wordless oeuvre uses textless word balloons containing symbols, icons, and other images. The influence of the wordless novel is prominent in Drooker's Flood (1992) and Kuper's The System (1997), both metaphorical stories that focus on social themes. Since 2011, the Pennsylvania State University Libraries and the Pennsylvania Center for the Book have awarded the annual Lynd Ward Prize for Graphic Novel, a cash prize established by Ward's daughters to highlight their father's influence on the development of the graphic novel.

== See also ==
- Asemic writing
- Frank, wordless comics by Jim Woodring
- Sequential art
- Wordless picture book
