= May McNeer =

May Yonge McNeer Ward (pen name, May McNeer; 1902 in Tampa, Florida – 1994 in Reston, Virginia) was a 20th-century American journalist and writer.

== Early life ==
McNeer's first published story appeared in a Washington, D.C. newspaper when she was eleven years old. Concrete evidence for her passion for writing during adolescence is slim.

== Career and awards ==
She attended the University of Georgia School of Journalism. McNeer was the first female undergraduate at the University of Georgia in her freshman year. She graduated in 1926 from Columbia School of Journalism. That same year when they married, the couple spent four months in Eastern Europe followed by a year in Leipzig in Germany where Ward studied Graphic Arts and Bookmaking. Returning to the U.S. they began work on the writing and publication of books. Many of her works were illustrated by her husband.

In 1975, the two were jointly awarded the Regina Medal a literary award conferred annually by the U.S. based Catholic Library Association in recognition for "continued, distinguished contribution to children's literature without regard to the nature of the contribution".

In 2020, Beebliome Books began to release many of McNeer's titles as e-books. These include: Up a Crooked River; My Friend Mac; Prince Bantam; Bloomsday for Maggie; Stranger in the Pines; Tales from the Crescent Moon; Waif Maid; and Armed with Courage.

== Personal life ==
The Wards lived in Cresskill, New Jersey, spending their summers in Canada. They had two daughters, Nanda and Robin (sic).

== Death ==
McNeer died in Reston, Virginia in 1994, aged 92. She died 10 years following her husband's death.

== Books ==
=== Landmark Books ===
- The California Gold Rush (1950)
- War Chief of the Seminoles (1954)
- The Alaska Gold Rush (1960)
