= Otto Nückel =

German artist (1888–1955)

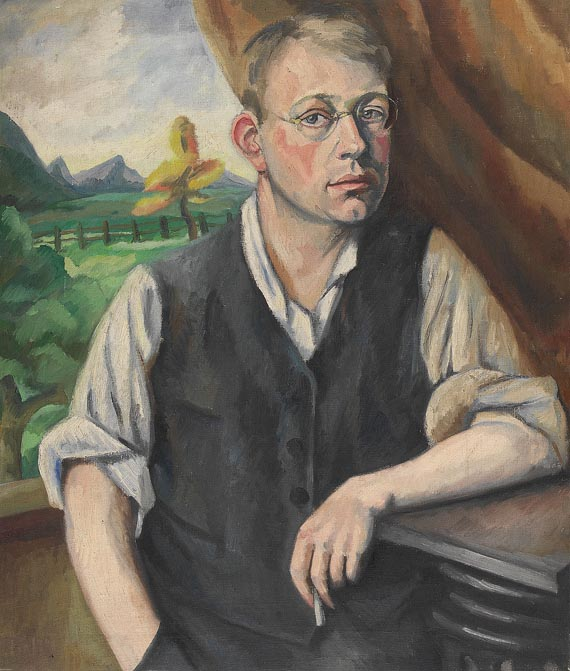
1920 self-portrait

Otto Nückel (Cologne, 6 September 1888 – Cologne, 12 November 1955) was a German painter, graphic designer, illustrator and cartoonist. He is best known as one of the 20th century's pioneer wordless novelists, along with Frans Masereel and Lynd Ward.

== Life ==
Nückel, who had exhibited skill as an artist in his childhood, dropped out of medical school in Freiburg im Breisgau and moved to Munich where he resided for the remainder of his life. There he developed his skill in drawing and painting, joining the artists' association, the Munich Sezession, and developing an interest in relief printing. Because of the scarcity of wood, Nückel made engravings for relief prints on lead plates. A pioneer in lead engraving, Nückel developed an accomplished mastery of this medium, distinguished by ample use of the multiple-line tool. He illustrated works by Thomas Mann, E. T. A. Hoffmann and others before garnering considerable attention with his own publication Schicksal. Eine Geschicte in Bildern. Munich: Delphin Verlag, 1926(?). Later published in English as Destiny: A story in pictures. 1930 London: Albert E. Marriott/1930 New York, Farrar & Rinehart. This wordless novel highlights the life and suffering of a female protagonist as a vehicle for a dark social critique. Much of Nückel's work favors dark comedy, profound irony and an often scathing sarcasm.

Nückel's series of "Studio Visits" (Atelierbesuche) to studios from Ensor to Bosch were famous. Nückel earned his living as an illustrator and cartoonist. He was a contributor to the satirical magazines Simplicissimus and Simpl, fantasy magazine Der Orchideengarten, and to children's periodical Ping-Pong.

New editions of Destiny have been published in the US by Dover and in France under the title 'Destin' in 2005 (Éditions IMHO, Paris) and in 2021 (Éditions Ici-bas, Toulouse).

== Work ==
=== As illustrator ===
Nückel provided illustrations for these books, among others:

- A. M. Frey, Solneman der Unsichtbare (woodcuts), Delphin Verlag, München, 1914
- A. M. Frey, Spuk des Alltags (woodcuts), Delphin Verlag, München, 1920
- Thomas Mann, Der kleine Herr Friedemann (woodcuts), Phantasus-Verlag, München, 1920
- Clemens Brentano, Das Märchen vom Schulmeister Klopfstock (wood engravings), Freitag-Verlag, München. 1947
- Stefan Andres, Vom heiligen Pfäfflein Domenico (wood engravings), Paul List Verlag, München, 1966

=== As author/illustrator ===
- Otto Nückel. Eine Würdigung von Willy Seidel. München 1930

=== Wordless Novels ===
- Schicksal: eine Geschichte in Bildern. Delphin-Verlag, München, 1920s
- Destiny: A Novel in Pictures. Farrar & Rinehart Inc New York, 1930
- Destiny: A Novel in Pictures. Albert E Marriott, London, 1930
- Schicksal: eine Geschichte in Bildern. Limmat Verlag Genossenschaft: Zürich, 1985
- Destin. Paris: IMHO, 2005
- Destiny: A Novel in Pictures. New York: Dover Publications, 2007.
- Destin. Éditions Ici-bas, Toulouse 2021

=== Exhibitions ===
- Lenbachhaus, München 1956
- Berufsverband bildender Künstler, München 1965
- EP Galerie, Düsseldorf 2005
