= Silent comics =

Comic with no speech or text

Silent comics (or pantomime comics) are comics which are delivered in mime. They make use of little or no dialogue, speech balloons or captions written underneath the images. Instead, the stories or gags are told entirely through pictures.

== Definition ==
Silent comics have the advantage of being easily understandable to people – like children – who are slow readers. The genre is also universally popular since translation is not required, lacking the usual language barriers. Sergio Aragonés, a famous artist in the field, once said in a 1991 interview with The Comics Journal:

What happens is like a supersimplification. Something you can say with words, you have to eliminate all the words until it can be told in a little story without words. You just think a little longer. But it becomes rewarding in the end because everybody can understand your cartoons no matter what your nationality. And that, to me, has been always a big thing—to do cartoons that everybody can understand, every age, every nationality. It is different. It's like in the theater. You have regular theater, and you have pantomime, like Marcel Marceau or Alejandro Jodorowsky. And I apply that to cartooning and it works.

Silent comics tend to be popular in the gag-a-day comics genre, where they typically consist of just three or four images per episode. But some graphic novels with longer narratives also make use of pantomime (see Wordless novels). This allows for a more visual experience, where the actual meaning of the events is left to the readers' own interpretation. Some famous silent-comics artists are Sergio Aragonés, Guy Bara, Chaval, Henning Dahl Mikkelsen, Adolf Oberländer, Wil Raymakers, Otto Soglow, Gluyas Williams and Jim Woodring.

== List of notable silent comics ==
=== Argentina ===
- The cartoons of Santiago Cornejo (Corne).
- The cartoons of Guillermo Mordillo.
- Most comics by Quino (Joaquín Salvador Lavado) (except for Mafalda).

=== Australia ===
- The Arrival by Shaun Tan.

=== Belgium ===
- 25 Images de la Passion d'un Homme (25 Images of a Man's Passion) by Frans Masereel.
- Balthazar by Bob de Moor.
- Cet Aimable M. Mops (The Loveable M. Mops) by Hergé.
- Fireplug kung fu by Eco.
- Game Over by Midam.
- Histoire Sans Paroles (Story Without Words) by Frans Masereel.
- The Idea (The Idea) by Frans Masereel.
- Klopstock by Sinap (pseudonym of Armand Panis).
- Love Story by Eco.
- Les Malheurs de Charlie by Jem
- Het Manneke by Marc Payot and Paul Ausloos.
- Maurice Rosy made a surreal pantomime comic about hat-like creatures in a seemingly Martian landscape in 1966, which never received a proper title.
- Max L'Explorateur (Max the Explorer) by Guy Bara.
- Les Mille et Une Aventures d'Oscar by Jean Léo.
- Mon Livre D'Heures (My Book of Hours) by Frans Masereel.
- Otto by Frodo De Decker.
- De Perfesser by Punt.
- Plunk by Luc Cromheecke and Laurent Letzer.
- Polo by Willem Dolphyn
- Pollopof by Marc Sleen.
- Poussy by Peyo.
- Prosper by Ploeg.
- Rik en zijn Veiligheidschef by Gaston Ebinger.
- De Slag om Turnhout by Conz.
- Le Soleil (The Sun) by Frans Masereel.
- La Ville (The City) by Frans Masereel.

=== Canada ===
- The Life and Times of Conrad Black by George Walker.
- The Mysterious Death of Tom Thomson by George Walker.
- Pour un Dîner de Noël by Raoul Barré.
- Southern Cross by Laurence Hyde.
- Tales From The Vase by Billy Mavreas.

=== China ===
- Mr. Chu and Aunt Eight by Mak Man-chung (occasionally makes use of pantomime).
- Old Master Q by Alfonso Wong (occasionally makes use of pantomime).
- Sanmao by Zhang Leping.
- The cartoons of Tango Gao.

=== Cuba ===
- Geste Hypergraphique by Roberto Altmann, a comic book with abstract imagery, a surreal plot and symbols and freeform interpunction. While there are speech balloons it's unreadable gibberish, making it somewhat of a pantomime comic.

=== Denmark ===
- Alfredo by Cosper and Jørgen Mogensen.
- The cartoons and comics by Herluf Bidstrup.
- Chas by Frederik Bramming.
- Ferd'nand by Henning Dahl Mikkelsen.
- Frederik by Frederik Bramming.
- Morkelige Mr. Mox by Cosper.
- Professor Phidus by Kaj Pindal.
- Rasmus by Jørgen Clevin.

=== Finland ===
- Lämsänperäläiset by Wallu.

=== France ===
- Arzach by Moebius.
- L'Enclos by Blexbolex.
- Lily Sprint by Bindle.
- Match by Grégory Panaccione
- Malabar, the mascot of chewing gum brand Malabar, whose adventures were told in pantomime comics. The first artist to draw the series was Jean-René Le Moing.
- Mistouflet by Aldé.
- Monsieur Mouche by Rab.
- Monsieur Pépin by Piem.
- La Mouche by Lewis Trondheim.
- Un océan d'amour by Grégory Panaccione and Wilfrid Lupano.
- Le Pantin by Michel Alzéal.
- Passages by Thibault Poursin.
- Petit Père Noël by Thierry Robin and Lewis Trondheim.
- Le Petit President by J. Lap.
- Pervers Pépère by Marcel Gotlib.
- Poustiquet by Bindle.
- Professeur Nimbus by André Daix.
- Riri by Maurice Chénechot.
- Les Souris by Pierre Clément.
- La Théorie du Chaos by Pierre Schelle.
- Turlupin by Piem.

=== Germany ===
- Die 5 Schreckensteiner by Ferdinand Barlog.
- Die Abenteur des kleinen Ako by Klaus Vonderwerth.
- Albert by Klaus Vonderwerth.
- Alpha...directions by Jens Harder.
- Beta ... civilisations part 1 by Jens Harder.
- Dackel Willi by Hans Kossatz.
- Fäustchen by Horst von Möllendorff.
- Der kleine Herr Jakob by Hans Jürgen Press.
- Der Löwe Adolar by Becker-Kasch.
- Männer ohner Worte by Frank Flöthmann.
- Pascha Bumsti by Ferdinand Barlog.
- Schicksal (Destiny) by Otto Nückel.
- Spacedog by Hendrik Dorgathen.
- Une semaine de bonté by Max Ernst.
- Vater und Sohn by E.O. Plauen, aka Erich Ohser.

=== Hungary ===
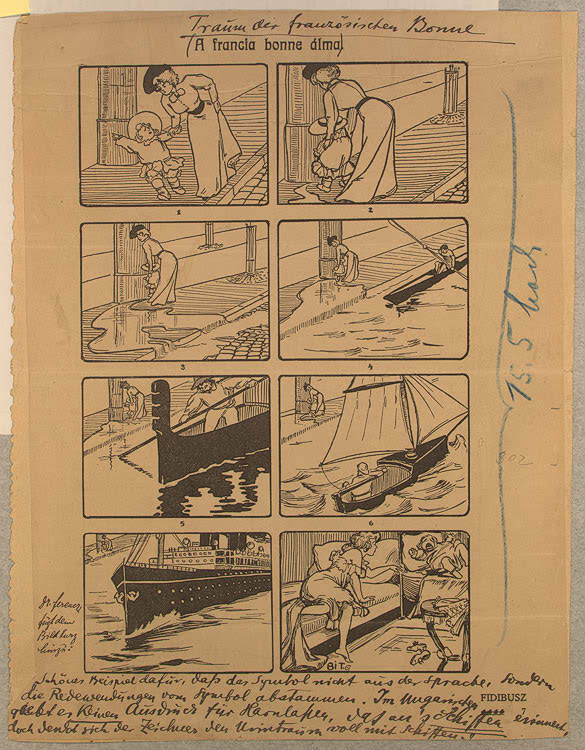
A Francia Bonne Álma, by Nándor Honti, from Hungarian humor magazine Fidibusz, 1911.

- Jucika by Pál Pusztai.
- Séta Álomországban by Bit (a.k.a. Nándor Honti). One particular episode, A Francia Bonne Álma (lit. 'The French Nurse's Dream' or 'The French Nanny's Dream'), took the interest of famous psychologists Sándor Ferenczi and Sigmund Freud.

=== Italy ===
- Squeak the Mouse by Massimo Mattioli.

=== Japan ===
- Gon by Masashi Tanaka.
- Kuri-chan by Susumu Nemoto
- Children of the City (街の子供) by Yutaka Aso (麻生豊)

=== Mexico ===
- Pedrito by William de la Torre.

=== Netherlands ===
- Adrian Backfish (a SF-story in the Doe-het-zelfdodingsgids of) Eric Schreurs
- Annemoon by Patty Klein and Piet Wijn.
- Bertje Branie by Ger Sligte.
- Boes by Wil Raymakers and Thys Wilms.
- Flossie by Gerard Wiegel.
- Gutsman by Erik Kriek.
- Het Leven in Karikatuur by Leendert Jordaan.
- Loeki de Leeuw by Wil Raymakers.
- Mea Culpa by Peter Kalberkamp.
- Mieke Meijer by Ger Sligte.
- Paradiso by Len Munnik.
- Pieterje Stastok by Steiner.
- Professor Pi by Bob Van den Born.
- Simpelman by Wim van Wieringen.

=== Norway ===
- Grosz by Lars Fiske.
- Sshhhh! by Jason.

=== Philippines ===
- Beelzebub by Malang Santos.
- Chain Gang Charlie by Malang Santos.
- Kosmé the Cop [Retired] by Malang Santos.
- Malangs Menagerie by Malang Santos.
- Pocholo by Malang Santos.

=== Poland ===
- Josephine by Elisabeth Brozowska.
- Professor Filutek by Zbigniew Lengren.
- Sans Titre by Jerzy Skarzynski.

=== Spain ===
- Cándído by José Luis Martin Mena, aka Mena.
- Don Celes by Olmo
- The work of OPS (pseudonym of Andrés Rábago).

=== Sweden ===
- Adamson (known as Silent Sam in the USA) by Oscar Jacobsson.
- Ba-Ba by Sten Rinaldo.
- Gorillan Gusten by Jan Romare.
- Götlund by Birger Malmborg.
- Gus by Gunnar Persson.
- Mannen Som Gör Vad Som Faller Honom In (The Man Who Does Whatever Comes To His Mind) by Oskar Andersson.
- Mullvaden Malte by Jan Romare.
- Pyton by Jan Romare.
- Ugglan Urban by Jan Romare.
- Ur Igelkotten Huberts Dagbok by Jan Romare.

=== Switzerland ===
- Alberto by Daniel Bosshart.
- Dead End by Thomas Ott.
- Geteilter Traum by Daniel Bosshart.
- Greetings from Hellville by Thomas Ott.
- Max by Pericle Luigi Giovannetti.
- Tales of Error by Thomas Ott.

=== Taiwan ===
- Ichthyophobia by Li Lung-chieh.

=== United Kingdom ===
- Brenda Breeze by Rolfe.
- Caesar by Tim.
- Chicko by Norman Thelwell.
- Come on, Steve! by Roland Davies.
- Les Aventures des Deux Barbus (The Adventures of the Bearded Duo) by Harold Mack for the Marten Toonder studios.
- Little Dead-Eye Dick by Charles Holt.
- Louie by Harry Hanan.
- Perkins by John Miles.
- The Snowman by Raymond Briggs.
- Sporting Sam by Reg Wootton.
- THHRP! by Leo Baxendale.
- Uncle Charlie by Peter Laing.

=== United States ===
- Age of Reptiles by Ricardo Delgado.
- The Ambassador by Otto Soglow.
- Bozo by Foxo Reardon.
- Doctor Bill by Jack Tippit.
- Fox Bunny Funny by Andy Hartzell.
- Frank by Jim Woodring.
- Gods' Man by Lynd Ward.
- Grindstone George by Clifton Meek.
- Hannah by Courtney Dunkel
- Hawks & Doves by Al Jaffee.
- He Done Her Wrong by Milt Gross.
- Henry by Carl Thomas Anderson.
- Herman by Clyde Lamb.
- Hi and Jinx by Jonny Hawkins.
- Johnny Mouse by Clifton Meek.
- Korgi by Christian Slade.
- Lancelittle by Paul Sellers.
- Little Farmer by Kern Pederson.
- Little Umjiji by Syd B. Griffin.
- Liō by Mark Tatulli.
- The Little King by Otto Soglow.
- A Mad Look At... and Marginals by Sergio Aragones.
- Madman's Drum by Lynd Ward.
- No Comment by Vahan Shirvanian.
- Owly by Andy Runton.
- Prelude to a Million Years by Lynd Ward.
- Sad Sack by George Baker started out as a pantomime comic, but later became a speech balloon comic.
- Sentinel Louie by Otto Soglow.
- Song Without Words by Lynd Ward.
- Splinters by William Steinigans (started out as pantomime comic, but after some episodes it began using dialogue).
- Spy vs. Spy by Antonio Prohías.
- Sticks and Stones by Peter Kuper.
- Sticky by Dale Lazarov and Steve MacIsaac.
- The Strange World of Mr. Mum by Irving Phillips.
- The System by Peter Kuper.
- Tall Tales by Al Jaffee.
- Travelin' Gus by Otto Soglow.
- Vertigo by Lynd Ward.
- Wild Pilgrimage by Lynd Ward.
- Wordless Workshop by Roy Doty.

=== Yugoslavia ===
- Ljuba Truba by Milorad Dobrić.

== See also ==
- Text comics
