= Ferd'nand =

Danish-American comic strip (1937–2012)

"No good deed goes unpunished" is the subtitle of this Ferd'nand Sunday strip (March 5, 2000). Henrik Rehr, who took over the strip in 1989, uses the signature "Rehr.Mik".

Ferd'nand is a Danish pantomime comic notable for its lack of word balloons and captions and its longevity (over seven decades). It was created by Henning Dahl Mikkelsen and first published in 1937 and new strips continued until the third cartoonist to draw it (Henrik Rehr) left the strip in 2006.

Reruns of old strips are still published regularly in several countries around the globe.

== History ==
Ferd'nand was first published in 1937 by the Presse-Illustrations-Bureau of Copenhagen. Created by Henning Dahl Mikkelsen, Ferd'nand features the adventures of the title character, his unnamed wife, unnamed son and family dog. Like Carl Anderson's Henry and Otto Soglow's The Little King, there is no dialogue in the strip, although there is the rare exception. While the characters usually speak via the occasional set of exclamation points or question marks, Ferd'nand has been seen to say "Africa," "Paris," and even with a word balloon, "Ok, James." This enabled the strip to achieve a wide distribution throughout Europe and, starting November 10, 1947, in the United States via United Feature Syndicate. Since Ferd'nand is pantomime, translation is not a problem, so the strip has been published in 30 countries.

Mikkelsen, or "Mik" as he preferred to be known, moved to the United States in 1946, becoming a citizen in 1954. Mikkelsen turned over the strip to others, including Frank Thomas (no relation to Disney's Frank Thomas) for a time from 1955 until the mid-1960s. Mik then drew it until his death in 1982, after which Al Plastino drew it until 1989. Plastino's strips were signed "Al + Mik".

Henrik Rehr, a Danish illustrator and painter, took over the strip in 1989, and was the final author. Rehr's strips are signed "Rehr.Mik".

== Characters and story ==
The main character, presumably named Ferd'nand, is a round, mustachioed, middle-aged father and husband, recognized by his conical hat. Ferd'nand's son sports a similar hat, while his wife and dog are rather unremarkable in appearance. Ferd'nand's father also appeared in one strip, looking and being dressed like his son except for the white hair and mustache and wearing eyeglasses.

Unlike most strips, Ferd'nand lacks basic continuity or any cast of recurring characters other than the immediate Ferd'nand family. Ferd'nand himself has been seen working in nearly every occupation and in any location imaginable. Similarly, each strip stands alone; no story spans multiple strips.

== Films ==
Two Ferd'nand animated cartoons were produced, both directed by H. Dahl Mikkelsen:

- Ferd'nand på fisketur (Ferd'nand's fishing trip) (1944)
- Ferd'nand på bjørnejagt (Ferd'nand's bear hunting) (1945)
