= Harry Hanan =

- Harry Hanan
- Born: Wallace Bond Bishop; 14 December 1916 Liverpool, Lancashire, England, UK
- Died: 19 January 1982 (age 65)
- Area: Cartoonist
- Notable works: Louie

Harry Hanan (14 December 1916 - 19 January 1982) was a British cartoonist, best known as the creator of the pantomime comic strip Louie which he began in 1947. Louie was a small chap, a loser who was constantly annoyed by life's little vicissitudes and minor moments. Hanan described his mild-mannered character as "the anti-Superman".

== Biography ==
Born in Liverpool, Lancashire, England, Harry Hanan went to the Liverpool School of Art and found employment doing layouts and illustrating articles for the Liverpool Evening Express, plus an occasional bonus for drawing a daily cartoon, eventually writing film reviews and serving as the newspaper's features editor. He also designed posters and stage sets in Liverpool.

An infantry commander during the Second World War, Hanan experienced six years of military service. In post-Second World War London, he became an editorial cartoonist with The People, London's weekly tabloid with a circulation of four million. Meeting his weekly deadline in short order, Hanan created Louie in his spare time, and it was first published in The People in March 1947. When H. R. Wishengrad, head of Press Features, saw Hanan's strip, he decided to syndicate it in the United States. With Hanan drawing both the daily and the Sunday strips, Louie found a large readership in more than 100 American newspapers, initially distributed by the Hall Syndicate and later by the Chicago Tribune Syndicate. Because Louie had visual gags with no words to translate, it also appeared in more than 100 publications in 23 countries, including Turkey and Japan. Some newspapers ran it on their editorial pages.

With the success of the strip, Hanan and his family left London in November 1948 and moved to the United States, where they settled in Westfield, New Jersey. Hanan's suburban lifestyle there was reflected in the strip's settings and characters. Hanan commented, "Even when we're settled, Louie and I tend to be shiftless. People seem to like that."

One comics historian noted that Louie bore a striking resemblance to Hanan, who retired in 1976 and died six years later.

== Exhibitions ==
Harry Hanan's Louie (22 August 1948)

Louie was included in the Renaissance Society's "Comic Strip as Art" exhibit at the University of Chicago 22 January to 22 February 1968.

Hanan's paintings were exhibited at the Walker Art Gallery and the Metropolitan Museum of Art and were in the permanent collection at the William Allen White Foundation. Hanan was also a judge at juried art exhibitions.

The popularity of Louie was indicated by its inclusion in the Newspaper Comic Strip Stars Drawing Tablet, published in 1959 by Hytone, a division of the Western Tablet & Stationery Corporation in Dayton, Ohio.

== Archives ==
The Harry Hanan Papers are in the Special Collections Research Center of the Syracuse University Library. This consists of 128 original daily Louie strips (1953–64) (traces of graphite, Zipatone, pen and ink on illustration board, approximately 4¾ x 17½ inches), a dozen newspaper and magazine clippings about Hanan and his work (including family pictures) (1947–50), reader correspondence (1947–63), an undated photograph of Hanan and one family picture (1948), plus 27 Louie proof sheets (1964–66) (six daily strips per newsprint sheet, 9 x 16½ inches).

== See also ==
- Ferd'nand
- Henry
- The Little King
