= Bozo (comic strip) =

Pantomime-style comic strip

- Author: Francis "FoXo" Reardon
- Website: https://www.gocomics.com/bozo
- Launch date: 1925
- End date: 1955
- Syndicate(s): The Times-Dispatch, Chicago Sun-Times Syndicate, Universal Press Syndicate/Universal Uclick/Andrews McMeel Syndication (2021–present)

Bozo, the first pantomime-style comic strip, was created by the cartoonist Francis X. Reardon (with the pen name Foxo Reardon, or FoXo Reardon), who penned it beginning from 1921, until his death from cancer in 1955. Bozo is called America's original pantomime comic strip. Bozo ran both as a daily comic strip as well as on Sundays.

The word "bozo" entered the popular lexicon in the 1920s through Reardon's weekly newspaper strip.

== About Bozo Comics ==
The character Bozo was created by Foxo Reardon at age 16. Starting as early as 1925, the comic strip appeared as a local weekly in The Times-Dispatch until it achieved national and international syndication through the Chicago Sun-Times Syndicate in 1945. Bozo appeared in the Richmond Times-Dispatch on Sunday for twenty years before it was syndicated nationally and internationally by Field Enterprises in 1945. Bozo was syndicated from 1945 to 1955.

In 1943, the Times-Dispatch called Bozo "the world's first pantomime comic strip", predating comics like Henry, The Little King, and other pantomime-style comics that arrived in the 1930s. Unlike most other pantomime comics where at least one or the other character may speak a word or a sentence, none of the characters in Bozo originally spoke a word.

From an article in the Richmond-Times Dispatch on March 24, 1935, the cartoonist himself, FoXo Reardon, said that, "Bozo and Bozanne were born in 1924 and I had to do 'em in pantomime because I hadn't learned to spell yet... ...But now I know all about spelling because the editorial department bought a new dictionary and I swiped the old one...." The article indicated that Mr. Reardon added, "So now every once in a while Bozo opens that big mouth of his and says something, but his pantomime is still his best humor."

The Times-Dispatch conducted a 1935 survey of 1,500 readers and found Bozo to be the second most popular comic, behind "Bringing Up Father". Once it reached syndication, the Chicago Sun-Times Syndicate conducted a similar survey where readers voted it the most popular comic carried by that syndicate. The Chicago Sun-Times Syndicate promoted Bozo as the world's original pantomime comic strip. The Bulletin of the Virginia Press Association (in page 8 and page 15) dated May 1946 called Bozo "The Mighty Nobody an Antidote For Blues".

These classic Bozo comics are being republished by Andrew Mc Meel's comics website Go Comics since February 22, 2021.

== Main characters ==
- Bozo: The title character. A short and unimpressive-looking man called Bozo. The syndicate described him as "America's roughneck".
- Bozann: Bozo's beautiful girlfriend.
- The Man with the umbrella, also known as Fuzzy: A mysterious "man with an umbrella" who appears more often than not in the background of strips, and who, on very rare occasions appeared in the foreground too. He's famous for sitting in high places or riding on vehicles hood and roof. He is one of the two main characters in another FoXo's strip, Puddin X.
- The neighborhood burglar, mischievous but harmless.
- Various uniformed officers of the law with whom Bozo often has "disagreements".
- Lady with a flower pot on her head, who appears on occasion.
- Bozo's little dog, appearing occasionally
