= Jucika =

Hungarian comic strip

- Jucika as she appears in panel two of the comic "Jucika megható panasza" (Jucika's touching complaint). She holds a tissue to her face, across from a weeping man.
- First publication: 1957, in the magazine Érdekes Újság

Jucika (Hungarian: [ˈju.tsi.kɒ]) is a Hungarian silent comic strip created by Pál Pusztai that ran from 1957 to 1970. The titular character is a witty, attractive woman who gets into a variety of comedic situations, often risqué and suggestive. The series satirizes and parodies sexism, with many of the strips involving Jucika navigating unwanted attention from men and her efforts to get the better of it.

Jucika was initially published in the magazine Érdekes Újság in 1957, and was later moved to Lúdas Matyi due to its popularity. It ran until Pusztai's death on September 11, 1970. There were over 500 comic strips in total. Nine strips of Jucika were printed in the East-German magazine Freie Welt. The series also ran in Canada under the name Judy. In 2003, a compilation of Jucika gags was published in China.

Jucika became popular internationally on social media in the 2010s. A museum exhibit dedicated to her was opened for nearly 5 months at the Hungarian Trade and Hospitality Museum in 2018.

== Overview ==
The main character, Jucika, is a woman with short black hair. She is depicted as attractive, independent, romantically forward, witty, and liberated. Many of the typically three-panel strips involve her responding to unwanted attention from men, to which she responds with clever reprisals or ploys to get the better of it. Other comics focus less on her appearance and more on humorous situations Jucika finds herself in; she was seen to have a wide variety of jobs and occupations throughout the strips. The strips feature little to no dialogue and rely mainly on visual humor and gags. However, in the fiftieth comic strip, Jucika herself finally "spoke" and told the readers about her life. She also spoke in a special news report dedicated to the comic series in 1964, as a celebration of her fifth anniversary.

== History ==
Jucika, who was introduced in 1957, was a cult phenomenon in 1950s and 1960s Hungary and a particularly popular feature of the newspapers that published her. The comic strip debuted in the newspaper Érdekes Újság.

In 1959, Érdekes Újság was merged with the Ország-Világ magazine, and from then on Pál Pusztai wrote Jucika for the satirical humor paper Lúdas Matyi. If Jucika was not included in one of the issues of Lúdas Matyi, the publisher would receive letters of complaint.

Jucika made appearances outside of the comics, such as on card calendars published by Budaprint. In 1964, she was played by actress Gabi Magda in a TV variety show, and she also appeared animated to promote a clothing company in a TV spot.

The strip transitioned to color printing upon its first comic for Ludas Matyi, an occasion commemorated with a special strip in which Jucika interviews for a job with the paper's mascot Matyi and his goose. From then on, the popularity of the character and its creator continued to grow. Jucika appeared several times on the front page of Ludas Matyi and hundreds of the comics were published in the magazine. Pusztai's last strip, which featured Jucika working as a flight attendant, was published on September 10, 1970. The then-51-year-old Pál Pusztai died a day later of sudden heart failure during a trip to Dubrovnik. An unsigned strip titled "Jucika and the melon market" (Jucika és a dinnyevásár) was later found in Pusztai's workplace and was published in the December 3, 1970 issue of Lúdas Matyi with a few other drawings by the artist.

== Recent popularity ==
Although during Pusztai's life Jucika was little known beyond Hungary, it gained an international fandom in the 2010s when the comics were shared on social media. In November 2019, a public booru was created for sharing fan art of the series. In 2026, Keegan the Animator's modernized adaptations of the comic, including a reframed scene of The Apartment, gained popularity on the internet with over 60 million views across multiple platforms, with a high number of fans in Brazil, Mexico and the United States.

From June 19 to November 4, 2018, a museum exhibition titled "What Did Jucika Buy?" (Mit vásárolt Jucika?) was opened at the Hungarian Museum of Trade and Tourism (Magyar Kereskedelmi és Vendéglátóipari Múzeum), which showed the history of advertisements targeted towards women throughout the socialist era of Hungary. It illustrated the dynamics of the advertising industry, along with how gender roles for women changed over the years, with Jucika being used as a caricature of the modern woman of the time. The exhibition contained video loops of classic Hungarian advertisements, along with an audio backdrop of classic jingles. It was the final part of a trilogy of exhibits; the first part, "Tournures and Hooped Petticoats" (Fardagály és kámvás rokolya) was held from 2010 to 2011, and the next, "Beauty and Advertising" (A szépség és a reklám), was held in 2014.

== Question of ownership ==
Since the creator of Jucika died in 1970, with no known heir, and the character has been used in textile advertisements, there appears to be no known ownership of the character, with several unauthorized reprints of the Jucika comics being sold online. According to legal staff, KBT Studios has spent months attempting to determine who currently holds the rights to Jucika. Legal representative YOGB claims extensive enquiries with government agencies, intellectual property offices and lawyers have so far failed to provide a definitive answer regarding ownership.
