= John Liney =

American cartoonist, 1912-1982

- Liney delivering a lecture in December 1968 on Henry and the history of comic strips at the MacMorland Center of Pennsylvania Military College (now Widener University) in Chester, Pennsylvania.
- Born: 1912
- Died: January 20, 1982 (aged 69); Feasterville, Pennsylvania
- Occupation: Cartoonist
- Known for: Henry
- Spouse: Rosa
- Children: 1

John J. Liney (1912 – January 20, 1982) was an American cartoonist who drew the daily Henry comic strip for 44 years.

== Early life ==
Growing up in Philadelphia, Liney attended the George C. Thomas Middle School and South Philadelphia High School.

== Career ==
Liney was working as a cartoonist at the Philadelphia Evening Ledger when he began selling gags to Henry's creator, Carl Thomas Anderson in 1936. He continued as a gagwriter until 1942, penciling the strip for Anderson from 1942 to 1945. When Anderson became ill, Liney took over the daily strip in 1945.

=== Comic books ===
During the 1940s, Liney taught cartooning at Temple University. He also drew the Henry comic books: Dell's Four Color #122 (October 1946) and #155 (July 1947), followed by 65 issues of Dell's Henry from 1948 to 1961.

Anderson died in 1948 and Liney continued drawing the daily Henry. In 1951, Liney was responsible for guiding the career of illustrator Jerry Pinkney by encouraging him and showing him his studio. Pinkney recalled, "When I was 12 years old, I was selling newspapers on a busy corner in Philadelphia, and John Liney was one of my customers. I realized here was a grown man doing the very same thing I loved doing. I saw the seeds of possibility. I knew if I worked hard, there would be some end to the process."

In 1952, Liney contributed to the USS Iowa's Cruise Book, commenting, "We are both proud and happy to contribute to our bit to your Cruise Book. We salute you and your crew, and will always be available for cartoons or anything else we can offer to the Navy. Thanks for thinking of Henry."

John Liney's Henry (March 30, 1973)

=== Lectures ===
In 1965, he contributed to The Cartoonist's Cookbook (Hobbs, Dorman & Company, 1966). He sometimes lectured on cartooning, delivering his "What's Funny about the Funnies" talk for the Women's Club of Morgantown, Pennsylvania, in 1968. He spoke that same year at a National Association of Music Merchants sales-management seminar in Dallas and at the MacMorland Center of Pennsylvania Military College (now Widener University) in Chester, Pennsylvania.

Liney's strips were reprinted internationally, including the Swedish Serie-pressen #12 (1972).

== Later life and death ==
Poor health forced Liney to retire in 1979. He was succeeded by Jack Tippit. The Henry Sunday strip was drawn by Don Trachte. During 1981, Liney was a resident at the Redeemer Village retirement community in Huntingdon Valley, Pennsylvania. He died on January 20, 1982 of a heart condition at the Ridge Crest Convalescent Center in Feasterville, Pennsylvania, survived by his wife Rosa, his daughter Muriel Liney Zerba (who died October 21, 2006) and his sister Ruth O'Connor.

== Legacy ==
Liney's work was included in Keith Mayerson's NeoIntegrity: Comics Edition exhibition at the Museum of Comic and Cartoon Art from March 12 to August 29, 2010. The exhibit included "over 210 cartoonists, illustrators, animators, and fine artists who work with the spirit and power of iconographic languages. With creators young and old, historic, currently famous and soon-to-be-famous, the exhibition is also about the community and legacy of iconographic art and its ability to productively influence the world."
