= Henning Dahl Mikkelsen =

Danish cartoonist (1915–1982)

Henning Dahl Mikkelsen (9 January, 1915 – June 4, 1982) was a Danish cartoonist, best known for creation of the long running newspaper comic strip Ferd'nand, which he signed as Mik. He was born in Skive, Denmark, and began the pantomime humor strip Ferd'nand in 1936. Because it had no dialogue or captions, it soon was circulated internationally. After World War II, he came to the United States, where he continued to do the strip while also profiting from California real estate.

He became a United States citizen in 1954. In 1970, he turned the strip over to Al Plastino.

Mikkelsen died unexpectedly, from a heart attack, in 1982 at age 67. He lived in Hemet, California and is buried at the San Jacinto Valley Cemetery in San Jacinto, California.

== See also ==
- Harry Hanan
- Otto Soglow
