= Pals (1933 film) =

1933 film

- Produced by: Amadee J. Van Beuren
- Starring: Unknown
- Music by: Gene Rodemich
- Animation by: Jim Tyer
- Color process: Black and white
- Distributed by: R-K-O Radio Pictures
- Release date: December 22, 1933
- Running time: 7 min., 44 sec.
- Country: United States
- Language: English

Pals, also known as Christmas Night is an American animated short film produced by Amedee J. Van Beuren at his New York, N.Y. animation studio. It was released on December 22, 1933 and is one of several cartoons produced by that studio that feature Otto Soglow’s character The Little King.

== Plot ==
The Little King is conveyed along an icy thoroughfare in a litter borne by four ice skaters. As they stride mechanically along, the sad king looks out at either side at children preparing for Christmas, here dragging along a Christmas tree, here hanging stockings; he sees two hoboes admiring a display window, and he goes over to admire it with them. They laugh together at a dancing figure in a music box, and the king takes note of a placard that reads “Come in and write your letter to Santa Claus”. This he does, coming after a little girl, and he whispers a request into Santa's ear; after ascertaining that the childlike monarch goes to bed early and eats his spinach, Santa assents to the request.

The king and his wayfaring friends are off to the palace in the litter; masking them in his ermine robe, the king leads them to his room, and the trio undress for a bath, the taller fellow's tatters falling off piecemeal to reveal a tattoo of the N.R.A.’s famous eagle, the shorter hobo’s unwashed toes being found to conceal a spider’s web. The three bathe together. The shorter of the king’s friends swallows the soap and blows bubbles intermittently for the rest of the film. Having dressed, the chums remove their stockings to nail over the fireplace; the poor men’s stockings pull the nails out of the wall. His Majesty sneaks into the sleeping Queen’s room and disrobes one of her feet as well for the same purpose.

As the trio sleep in the king’s bed, a bubble blown involuntarily by the king’s shorter friend shows wood being sawed. The bubble pops, and the surprised three listen for Santa, who parks his sleigh on the roof and comes down the chimney, his girth taking much of the brick as he goes. Within, he bores through the floor with an auger and plants an “Xmas tree seed”, which sprouts to fullness in seconds, complete with the traditional trimmings of lights, garland, and ornaments. The three friends zip about the palace in the noisy toy vehicles Santa has left for them, the king and the shorter hobo in little cars, the taller fellow in a little plane. The drivers collide, and, from the wreck, the king emerges, now the one hiccuping bubbles!
