= Big Fat (disambiguation) =

Big Fat(s) or Bigfat may also refer to:

== Computing ==
- Final FAT16, sometimes referred to as "BigFAT"

== Dog ==
- "Big Fat" or Da Pang (dog), a dog

== Music ==
- "Big Fat", a 1998 song by Anthrax

== Television ==
- "Bigfat", a 2013 Family Guy episode
