= Don Trachte =

American cartoonist

- Born: Donald Trachte; May 21, 1915; Madison, Wisconsin
- Died: May 4, 2005 (aged 89); Manchester, Vermont
- Occupation: Cartoonist
- Known for: Henry
- Children: 4

Donald Trachte (May 21, 1915 – May 4, 2005) was an American cartoonist known for his work on the comic strip Henry.

== Personal life ==
Trachte was born in Madison, Wisconsin in 1915. He graduated from Central High School in Madison, attended the University of Wisconsin–Madison and later served in World War II as a lieutenant. The Trachte family lived in Sandgate, Vermont for many years. Trachte died in 2005 in the neighboring city of Manchester. Trachte has four children: a daughter, Marjorie Rosenberg, Locust Valley, N.Y.; Donald Trachte Jr., Burlington; David Trachte, Sandgate; and Jon Trachte, Houston, Texas.

== Career ==
He started working on comics in 1932 as an assistant of Carl Thomas Anderson at age 17, after taking art classes from Anderson in high school. He worked on the Sunday version of the Henry comics from Anderson's death in 1948 until 1995. (John Liney worked on the daily comics.)

While living in Vermont, Trachte became friends with a group of artists that included Norman Rockwell, Grandma Moses, and Mead Schaeffer. The Trachte family lived in Schaeffer's old house, which Trachte bought from him in 1950.

== Norman Rockwell replica ==
A discovery in 2006 revealed that Trachte created a near-perfect replica of Rockwell's Breaking Home Ties as well as several other original works that he owned, ostensibly in order to protect them. An article in The New York Times speculated that he may have made the copies in order to keep his wife, Elizabeth from getting them after their divorce in 1973. Upon the discovery of the original Breaking Home Ties by his son Don Jr., it was sold at auction for $15 million, a record at the time for a Rockwell.
