= The Ambassador (comic strip) =

American comic strip by Otto Soglow

- A 13-panel, black-and-white installment of Otto Soglow's comic strip The Ambassador.
- Author: Otto Soglow
- Current status/schedule: Concluded
- Launch date: May 28, 1933
- End date: September 2, 1934
- Syndicate: King Features Syndicate
- Genre(s): Gag-a-day, pantomime comics
- Followed by: The Little King

The Ambassador was a short-lived newspaper comic strip created by Otto Soglow, which ran from May 28, 1933, to September 2, 1934.

In 1931, Soglow introduced his Little King character in The New Yorker. William Randolph Hearst was determined to see The Little King syndicated by his own King Features Syndicate, but contractual obligations prevented the transfer of the strip. Soglow solved the conflict by selling Hearst a temporary, nearly-identical strip: The Ambassador.

When Soglow's contract with The New Yorker expired in 1934, The Little King was able to immediately resume as a King Features Sunday strip on September 9 of that year, only a week after the final appearance in The New Yorker. Having outlived its purpose, The Ambassador was cancelled.

== Characters and story ==
A forerunner for the King's arrival in the form of an Ambassador, the same pantomime format was employed with similar situations in the characters and gags. Differences between the two strips were subtle, and the art style was identical. When the time came to change the title from The Ambassador to The Little King, readers could not be certain if it was the Little King who had arrived into Hearst syndication or the Ambassador who had removed a disguise.
