= Dick Hodgins Jr. =

American cartoonist

Dick Hodgins
- Born: Dick Hodgins Jr. May 9, 1931; Binghamton, New York, U.S.
- Died: April 3, 2016 (aged 84)
- Occupation: Cartoonist
- Children: 2 sons (Richard III, Jonathan)

Signature
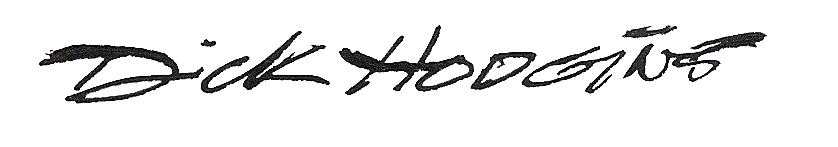

Dick Hodgins Jr. (May 9, 1931 – April 3, 2016) was an American cartoonist whose work included illustration, comic strips, and political cartoons.

== Career ==
Born in Binghamton, NY, the Hodgins family moved to Queens, NY. Dick, the son of Orlando Sentinel cartoonist, Dick Hodgins Sr., was twelve years old when a sale to the now defunct New York Mirror for one dollar spurred him to a cartoon career. After attending the School of Visual Arts and Military Service (editing and drawing for a base newspaper in Osaka, Japan and contributing to Pacific Stars and Stripes) Hodgins returned to the educational film industry. He then joined the Associated Press illustrating feature news stories. Hank Ketcham, creator of Dennis the Menace, selected Hodgins to draw his second comic strip Half Hitch for King Features Syndicate. Hodgins also created editorial cartoons for the New York Daily News. After cancellation of "Half Hitch" he took on the production of King Features iconic comic strip Henry.

Hodgins is named in the end-credits of the episode entitled "The Dead File" in Season 9 of Murder, She Wrote for the original comic strips featuring "Jessica Fox." This is also acknowledged on imdb.com.

Hodgins drew cartoons for Pigmeat Markham's autobiography Here Comes the Judge.

Hodgins worked full-time preparing and renovating the end-product art of Dik Browne's popular comic strip Hägar the Horrible and continued to create editorial cartoons for several Connecticut newspapers along with the occasional advertising assignment.

== Family ==
A widower with two sons, Hodgins lived in Wilton, CT until his passing on April 3, 2016.

== Awards ==
Hodgins won the National Cartoonist Society Advertising and Illustration Award for 1964 and 1966, and their Editorial Cartoon Award for 1972 and 1976.
