= Anthony Hyde =

Canadian author

- Born: 1946 (age 79–80); Ottawa, Ontario, Canada
- Occupation: Novelist
- Writing career
- Period: 1985–Present
- Genres: Spy novel, general fiction
- Website: anthonyhyde.ca

Anthony Hyde (born 1946) is a Canadian author of spy novels, most notably The Red Fox and Formosa Straits.

== Background ==
Hyde was born in Ottawa, in 1946, and is the son of the artist and film-maker, Laurence Hyde.

During the 1960s, Hyde played a leadership role in the Canadian New Left, especially with The Student Union for Peace Action, and his writing has always had a strong political element.

His first novel, The Red Fox (1985), is a spy novel published in more than twenty countries, with a historical background that ranged from the Comintern in the 1930s to the development of an ultra-nationalist right in contemporary Russia. China Lake (1992) was set at the Naval Weapons Center, China Lake (now the Naval Air Weapons Station). Its theme is the interface between science and the military, and its background is the development of rocketry from the Nazi era into the Cold War. Formosa Straits (1995) is set in China and Taiwan during the closing days of the Mao era, while Double Helix (1995) involves the development of a sex-selective contraceptive vaccine.

Anthony Hyde's brother, Christoper Hyde (1949–2014) was also a novelist, author of The Wave (1979), A Gathering of Saints (1996) and other books. Writing as Nicholas Chase, the Hyde brothers together wrote Locksley (1983), a historical novel about Robin Hood.

Hyde has written one non-fiction book, Promises, Promises (1997), that examined the role of political promises in Canadian political life.

Hyde has written one novel outside of the thriller genre, A Private House (2007), about the psychological, sexual and religious adventures of two women, set in contemporary Havana.

Hyde's Picture This (2007), written for ABC Literacy Canada, is part of the Good Reads Series of books, a program that provides exciting reading material for adult literacy classes.

== Bibliography ==
- The Red Fox – Knopf (1985) - "Told in the devilishly suave, casually lyric tones of Richard Burton, this debut thriller drips with shock and gore but is superior fare, with an especially flesh voice in the opening pages" and "this is a work of such savoir-faire and sheer style, and features so many enjoyably full-bodied minor characters, that much is forgiven, including overplottiness, while the Russian material is tremendously attractive and vital."
- China Lake – Knopf (1992) - "Though its final unravelings become quite thin, and whether Hyde's endless deductive style really holds is questionable, this is a winner." "China Lake is a highly assured performance--intricately plotted, psychologically astute and written with often startling power" and "But above all it is Hyde's evocation of the unforgiving desert, especially its forbiddingly dark nights, that lifts the novel far above conventional suspense fiction."
- Formosa Straits – Penguin Canada (1996) - "Hyde (China Lake, 1992; The Red Fox, 1985) returns in top form with an intricately woven tale of love, murder, and family set in the new Asia" and "Intelligent, literate, and unsentimental." "Hyde can tell a ripping tale" and "The final pages serve Nick a fate so poetically just that it rings false, but that's the only significant flaw in this otherwise unusually intelligent and finely wrought thriller."
- Promises, Promises: Breaking Faith in Canadian Politics – Viking (1997)
- Double Helix – Viking (1999)
- A Private House – Penguin (2007)
