= Fox Bunny Funny =

2007 graphic novel by Andy Hartzell

Publication information
- Publisher: Top Shelf Productions
- Publication date: June 2007

Creative team
- Created by: Andy Hartzell

Fox Bunny Funny is a graphic novel by Andy Hartzell. The book was published in June 2007 by Top Shelf Productions. Through its use of anthropomorphic animals drawn in black and white without the use of word bubbles or text, it conveys themes of desire, violence, identity crises and psychological distress.

== Plot ==
Fox Bunny Funny is set in a world of anthropomorphic foxes and bunnies. The protagonist of the novel is a young unnamed fox.

=== Chapter One ===
The story begins as the protagonist rides his bike to a butcher shop. The butcher chops some meat off of a bunny for him. When paying for the meat, the cashier tries to look into the protagonist's bag, but it is pulled away quickly. He leaves the butcher shop and rides on his bike again. On his way back, the protagonist runs into another group of young foxes riding on bikes. They lead him to a movie theater, where they point to a poster for a film showing a strong fox standing on top of a pile of dead bunnies. The protagonist refuses to see the movie, so the other kids push him over and begin throwing his belongings back and forth. The protagonist quickly steals back the bag, and sets off on his bike once more. Upon returning home, he removes the meat from his bag, and hides the rest of the contents behind some bushes. After giving the meat to his mom for their dinner, the protagonist watches as his younger sibling plays a video game involving chasing down and eating bunnies. The protagonist tries to play the game, but lets the bunny get away to eat a carrot. Their mom announces that dinner is ready. At dinner, the protagonist's younger sibling eats his food voraciously and the protagonist excuses himself from the table. As he goes upstairs, the protagonist grabs his bag from the bushes outside. Following dinner, the protagonist's mother gets a call from a neighbor who seems very alarmed. The mother goes upstairs to find the protagonist jumping up and down in a bunny costume.

=== Chapter Two ===
Chapter Two begins with the protagonist's family dropping him off at a camp to indoctrinate him in the ways of being a "proper" fox. The protagonist learns how to shoot a gun for hunting bunnies, and earns the praise of his fellow campers. The campers are driven to a town where bunnies live so they can hunt them. The protagonist is sickened by the hunting, so he leaves the others and finds a bunny church with no one inside. He falls asleep on a pew, dreaming that a group of bunnies lift him above their hands, and he becomes a bunny himself. When he wakes, a group of bunnies are eating carrots in the church. They give him a carrot, and they all begin hopping around with him. Meanwhile, the other fox campers walk up to the church to find the protagonist playing with bunnies. Realizing he has been caught, the protagonist turns and devours all of the bunnies.

=== Chapter Three ===
Some years later, the protagonist is visited by a bunny in the night. He chases after the bunny with his gun, but is unable to catch him. Outside his house, a silhouetted face is painted on his house, one ear resembling a fox and one ear resembling a bunny. The protagonist follows the bunny to the top of a cliff, and falls into a river below. The river flows into a dark tunnel, and leads to a ladder. He climbs the ladder, and discovers a world filled with foxes and bunnies that are friendly. The protagonist collapses in the street, and an ambulance drives him to a hospital. He is carted into a surgery room with an audience. Following the surgery, the protagonist is covered in bandages. After taking off the bandages, he discovers he has been turned into a bunny. The audience begins clapping as he cries in joy.

== Style and themes ==
Drawn entirely in simply black and white graphics, Fox Bunny Funny caused reviewers to draw references to "Rwandan genocide, Nazi Germany, the consumer economy, animal rights, and gay and lesbian identity issues". The lack of speech or thought bubbles in the novel creates a theme of "oppression" or "search for self". The final chapter of the novel changes format: from six panels per page to large double-page images of the "funny" society to change the rhythm. The integrated fox-bunny society is still enamored with violence but in the form of fantasy, drawing a political allegory. The endpaper of the book consists of tiled fox and bunny faces, drawing a reference to M. C. Escher. Francisca Goldsmith of Booklist wrote that the protagonist's desire to be a bunny is a comparison to cross-dressing.

== Reception ==
Fox Bunny Funny was praised for its ability to convey an entire narrative without using any text. A New York Times reviewer called Hartzell's design sense "clever and nuanced". Also pointed out were "wicked comedic details" such as fox ears on top of cars, a written language consisting of paw prints, and the bunny's religion consisting of "acceptance of suffering and death in the hope of divine vengeance". Francisca Goldsmith of Booklist called Fox Bunny Funny "a must for libraries supporting LGBT collections".
