= Welsh Corgi =

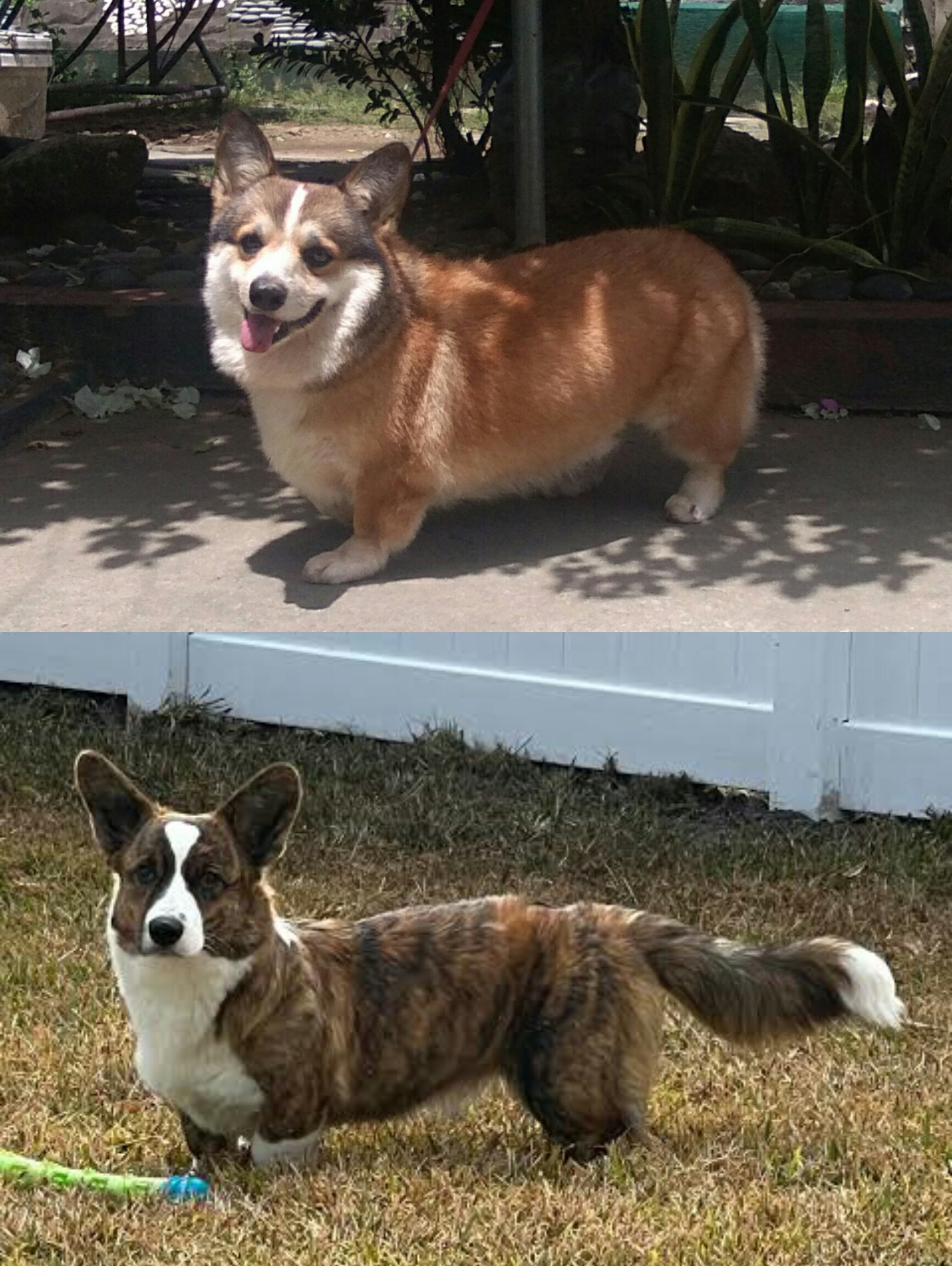
- Pembroke and Cardigan Welsh Corgi
- Origin: Wales
Traits
| Height | Males | Cardigan: 27–32 cm (11–13 in); Pembroke: 25–30 cm (9.8–11.8 in) |
| | Females | Cardigan: 27–32 cm (11–13 in); Pembroke: 25–30 cm (9.8–11.8 in) |
| Weight | Males | Cardigan: 14–17 kg (31–37 lb); Pembroke: No greater than 14 kg (31 lb) |
| | Females | Cardigan: 14–17 kg (31–37 lb); Pembroke: No greater than 11 kg (24 lb) |
- Coat: Cardigan: Short or medium length, hard textured, weatherproof with a good undercoat; Pembroke: Medium length with a straight dense undercoat
- Color: Cardigan: Any colour, with or without white markings; Pembroke: Red, sable, fawn, or black and tan with or without white markings on the legs, brisket, and neck

The Welsh Corgi or Corgi (Note: The usual plural form in English is Corgis, although the Welsh plural Corgwn /ˈkɔːrɡuːn/ is occasionally used.) (/ˈkɔːrɡi/) is a small type of herding dog that originated in Wales. The name corgi derives from the Welsh words cor and ci (which is mutated to gi), meaning "dwarf" and "dog", respectively.

Two separate breeds are recognised: the Pembroke Welsh Corgi and the Cardigan Welsh Corgi. Physical differences are seen between the two breeds. According to the breed standards, overall, the Cardigan is larger in weight and height and has a much longer tail than the Pembroke.

Historically, the Pembroke has been attributed to the influx of dogs alongside Flemish weavers from around the 14th century. In contrast, the Cardigan is attributed to the dogs brought with Norse settlers, in particular a common ancestor of the Swedish Vallhund.

The Pembroke is the more popular of the two, yet still appears on the Kennel Club's vulnerable dog breeds of the United Kingdom list. The Pembroke Welsh Corgi gained popularity because Elizabeth II personally owned more than 30 Pembrokes or Corgi-Dachshund crosses (known as dorgis).

== History ==
Pembrokeshire and Cardiganshire are adjoining historical agricultural counties in West Wales. Welsh Corgis were cattle herding dogs, the type of herding dog referred to as "heelers", meaning that they would nip at the heels of the larger animals to keep them on the move. The combination of their low height off the ground and the innate agility of Welsh Corgis would allow them to avoid the hooves of cattle. In the Welsh language, the word "Corgi" literally translates to dwarf dog (cor = dwarf, gi = lenited form of ci, dog). In Welsh, the term can also be used more broadly to mean a cur or a working dog. (Note: See Wiktionary: corgi § Welsh) Different tales have been told of the Corgi's origin; some believe that the two modern breeds evolved from shared ancestry, while others attribute the import of the Pembroke Welsh Corgi to Flemish weavers starting around the 10th century. Further theories on the origin of the Pembroke variety suggest that they may have originated from central European herding breeds from the area around modern Germany. Depending on the time when these dogs were imported to Wales, they could have been either Deutsche Bracken or Dachshund.

The Cardigan Welsh Corgi has been attributed to the influences of Nordic settlers in the region. Dogs of similar dimensions exist in modern Scandinavia, called the Swedish Vallhund, and some historians claim that these two breeds share a common ancestor. Hill farmers increasingly switched from cattle to sheep in the 19th century, but the Corgi was not suited for working sheep. Similarities between the Welsh Corgis have been attributed to crossbreeding between the two or simply selected breeding from those who wished to have the Cardigan variety appear closer in nature to the Pembroke.

The first recorded date for Corgis appearing in the show ring in Wales is 1925. Captain J. P. Howell called together a meeting of breeders of both the Pembroke and the Cardigan varieties and formed the Welsh Corgi Club, with an initial membership of 59 members. A general breed standard was drawn up, and Corgis began to appear in conformation shows. Until this point, neither breed had been specifically bred for looks. Members of this club were primarily interested in the Pembroke variety, although the Cardigan variety also appeared. At that point, the breeds were referred to as the Pembrokeshire and Cardiganshire varieties. There were a number of disputes between breeders of the two types in early shows, as judges who were breeders of one type would often favour them. The Welsh Corgi appeared at Crufts—a dog show held annually in the United Kingdom—for the first time in 1927.

The first championship was awarded at a Cardiff show in 1928 to a red and white Pembroke bitch named Shan Fach. The breeds continued to be judged together until 1934, when the Kennel Club recognized each breed separately. Some 59 Cardigans and 240 Pembrokes were listed in the pedigree books in that initial registration. The decisions about the breed to which each dog belonged were sometimes left to the owners, who were free to choose whichever they felt was the most appropriate. The first dog to be named best-in-show at an open conformation show was Ch. Bowhit Pivot.

Cardigan Welsh Corgis continued to be rarer than Pembrokes, with only 11 registrations in 1940. Both breeds survived the Second World War, although the Cardigans registered with the Kennel Club numbered only 61 by the war's end. Pembrokes became very popular during the postwar years in the United Kingdom; in 1953, it was ranked as the fourth-most popular breed by the Kennel Club, behind the English Cocker Spaniel, the German Shepherd, and the Pekingese. In 1955, the reserve Best in Show at Crufts was the Pembroke Welsh Corgi Kaytop Maracas Mint. The Corgi breeds declined in popularity: veterinary physician Brian Singleton suggested in The Times in 1963 that this was due to issues with their temperament.

The Cardigan Welsh Corgi was listed in the Kennel Club's first list of Vulnerable Native Breeds in 2006. This list is for those breeds which register less than 300 dogs in any one year; there had been 84 Cardigan Corgis registered in 2006. After an initial increase, this declined to 46 in 2010 but rose to the highest number since the list began in 2015, with 124 puppies registered. In 2013, the Pembroke Welsh Corgi was also added, as there had been only 241 puppies registered that year. While the Kennel Club blamed this decline on the importation of foreign dog breeds, The Daily Telegraph faulted the UK's 2006 Animal Welfare Act, which banned tail-docking for cosmetic purposes. However, 2015 had an increase of 34% in the number of Pembroke registrations; the popularity of Corgis on Instagram was credited for the change. Pembrokes were removed from the Vulnerable Native Breeds list in 2016.

=== United States ===
In 1933, American breeder Lewis Roesler brought the first Welsh Corgis to the United States for her Merriedip Kennels in the Berkshire Hills of Massachusetts. She had previously been well known for breeding Old English Sheepdogs. Roesler purchased a Pembroke Corgi, Little Madam, at London's Paddington Station for £12. Wanting a mate for the dog, she visited several Corgi kennels and bought a dog called Captain William Lewis. The American Kennel Club (AKC) first registered Welsh Corgis in 1934 as a single breed, and Little Madam was the first registered animal of the breed. The first litter was registered later that year, by Mr E.M. Tidd in Oakland, California, from a bitch named Toots, which he had purchased in Canada.

Tidd imported Ch. Bowhit Pivot for his breeding lines in 1935, registering him with the AKC as Sierra Bowhit Pivot. In addition to his British titles, he became the first Corgi to be awarded champion status in the US and the first such dog to be named Best of Group at a conformation show in the United States. The Pembroke Welsh Corgi club was formed in 1937, and the first show was held at Geraldine Rockefeller Dodge's Giralda Farms in New Jersey. Following the Second World War, imports from the United Kingdom included Rozavel Uncle Sam, which dominated the show circuit for Corgis. In 1949, he became the first Pembroke winner of best-in-show at an open conformation show in the United States. By 1998, the Pembroke Welsh Corgi had become the 37th-most popular breed of dog in the US.

A pair of Cardigan Welsh Corgis was imported to the US in 1931, but the first member of that breed to be registered with the AKC was Blodwen of Robinscroft in 1935. They have never been as popular in the US as the Pembroke type. In 1997, some 752 Cardigan Welsh Corgis were registered with the AKC, compared to 8,281 Pembrokes.

== Modern breeds ==
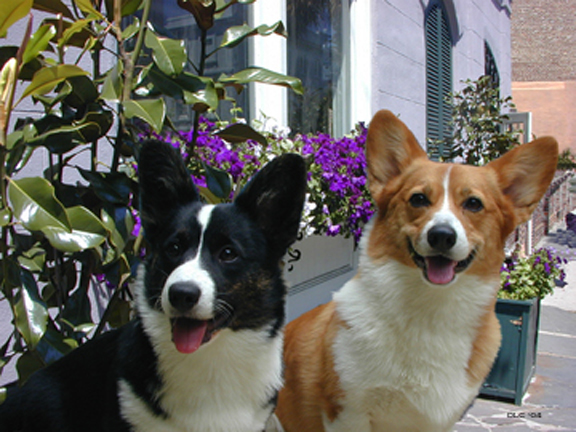
A Cardigan Welsh Corgi (left) and a Pembroke Welsh Corgi (right)

The two breeds of Welsh Corgis, the Cardigan and the Pembroke, are named for the counties in Wales from where they originated. The dogs share several similar traits, such as their coats, which are water-resistant and shed on average twice a year. The body of the Cardigan is slightly longer than that of the Pembroke; both breeds have short legs, placing their bodies close to the ground. They are not as square in outline as a typical Terrier, nor have an elongated body as great as that of a Dachshund. Only minor differences in the shape of the head are seen; both appear fox-like. The head of a Cardigan Welsh Corgi is typically larger than that of an equivalent Pembroke and has a larger nose. A few days following birth may be needed for the true color of a Corgi's coat to appear, and this is particularly evident in those with tricolor or black and tan markings. Corgis in the modern era often compete in dog agility trials, obedience, showmanship, flyball, tracking, and herding events. Herding instincts and trainability can be measured at non-competitive herding tests. Cardigan and Pembroke Corgis exhibiting basic herding instincts can be trained to compete in herding trials—known colloquially as a "mad run". Welsh Corgis were once used to guard children.

=== Cardigan Welsh Corgi ===
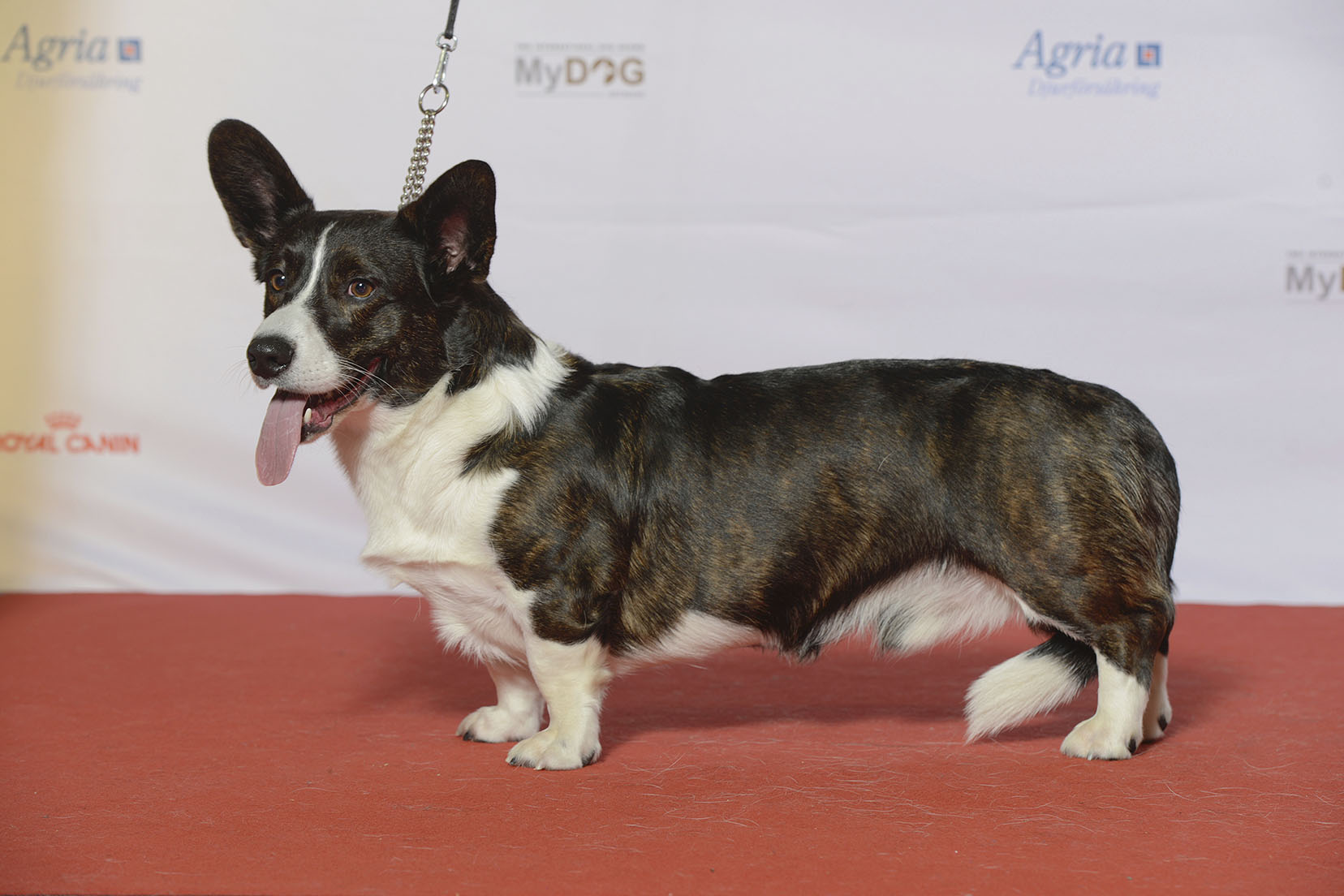
Cardigan Welsh Corgi

The differences between the two breeds include bone structure, body length, and size. Cardigans are the larger of the two breeds, with large, rounded ears and a 12-inch-long (30 cm), fox-like, flowing tail set in line with the body. Though the Cardigan is allowed more colors than the Pembroke, white should not predominate in its coat. The Cardigan is a double-coated dog where the outer coat is dense, slightly harsh in texture, and of medium length. The dog's undercoat is short, soft, and thick. According to the breed standard, the breed stands between 10.5 and 12.5 inches (27 and 32 cm) at the withers, and should weigh 30–38 pounds (14–17 kg). The skeletal structure of the Cardigan differs from the Pembroke in that a more exaggerated bend exists in the front two legs, which fits around the ribcage of the animal. In addition, the Cardigan is more heavily set than the Pembroke, with denser bone mass.

A greater number of colours of coat is present in the Cardigan breed than the Pembroke, with the breed standard allowing for a variety of shades of red, sable, and brindle. White markings are expected on this breed of Corgi, and one with a black coat is allowed to have tan or brindle points under conformation show rules. Merle markings are present in the breed, although this is normally restricted to blue merle. Several disqualification criteria are used in the breed standard for the purpose of confirmation shows. This would include drop ears, a white coat, blue eyes, or nonsolid black noses in dogs without merle coloration.

=== Pembroke Welsh Corgi ===
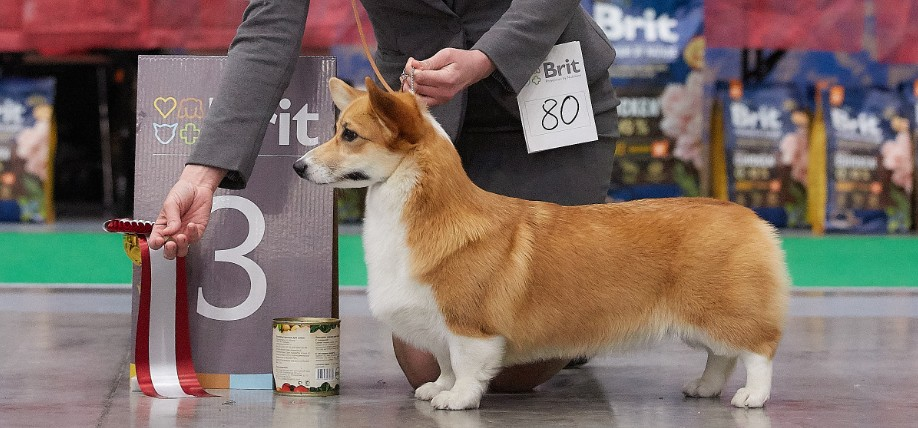
Pembroke Welsh Corgi at Corgi Symphony, 2019

Pembrokes feature pointed ears, and are somewhat smaller in stature than the Cardigan. They are low-set, intelligent, strong, and sturdy with stamina sufficient to work a day on the farm. The common height at the withers is 10–12 inches (25–30 cm), while a male dog of this breed should weigh no more than 30 pounds (14 kg), and a female 25 pounds (11 kg). The tail is shorter than that of a Cardigan, which can be accomplished through breeding or docking. Historically, the Pembroke was a breed with a natural bobtail (a very short tail). Due to the advent of tail docking in dogs, the bobtail was not aggressively pursued, with breeders focusing, instead, on other characteristics, and the tail was artificially shortened if need be. Given that some countries now ban docking, some breeders are again attempting to select dogs with the genes for natural bobtails.

Fewer colours of coat appear in the Pembroke breed. These include red, sable, tan, fawn, and black, each with or without white markings. Plain white or grey coats can also be seen, but these would be considered a serious fault for conformation shows. However, the Pembroke Welsh Corgi has no specific disqualification criteria present in the breed standard.

Pembroke Welsh Corgis have two coats that vary in length along their body. The first coat is a shorter, inner coat resistant to harsh weather, while the outer coat is rougher and longer, but still of medium length. The length of the coat differs on various parts of the body. Fur tends to be longer and thicker behind their fore and hind legs and underneath their bodies. In addition, they appear to have more voluminous fur on their chest, neck, and shoulders. Pembroke Welsh corgis have shedding coats.

== Health ==
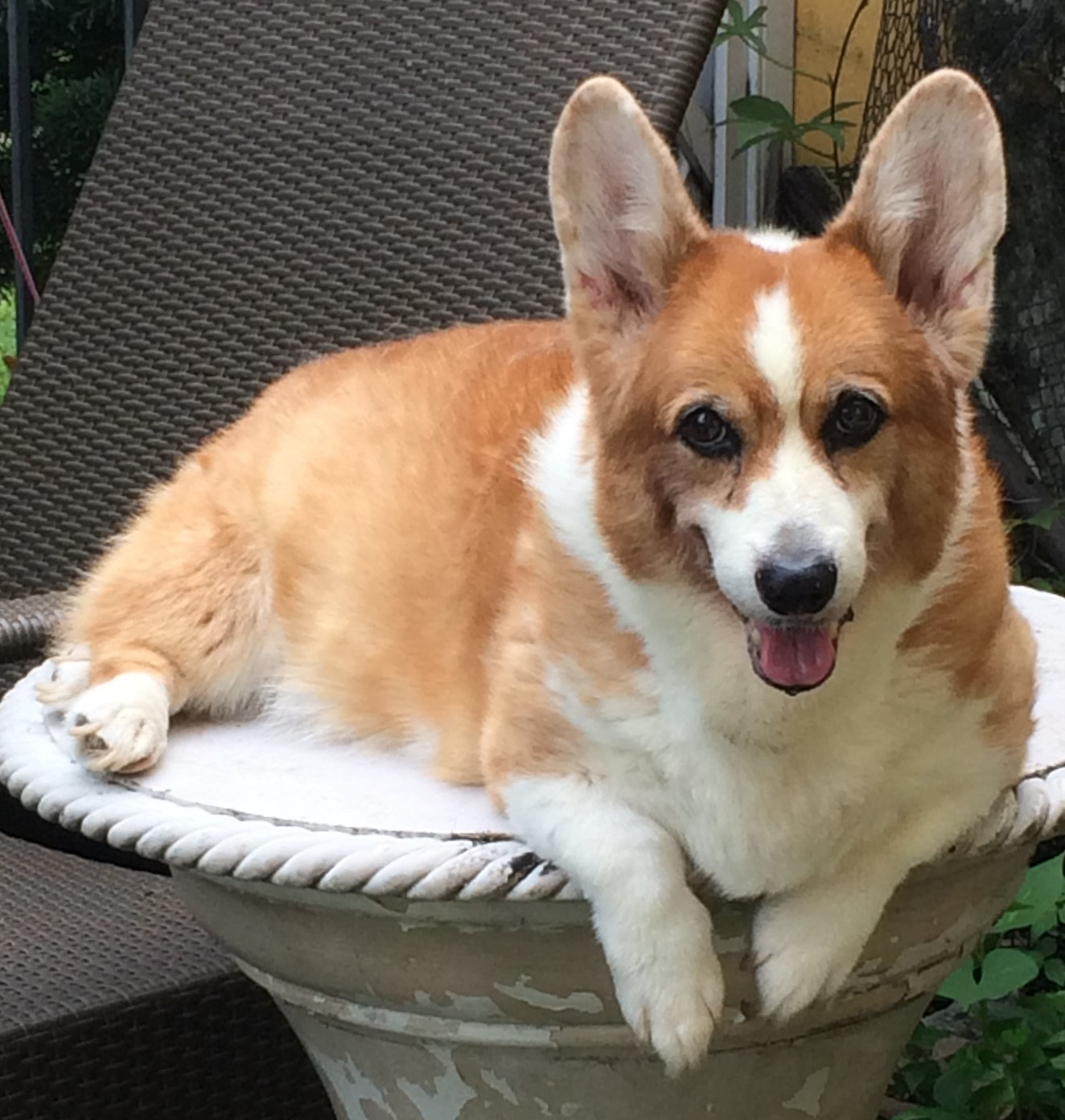
A 14-year-old Pembroke Welsh Corgi

According to the Kennel Club Purebred Dog Health Survey conducted in 2004, the two breeds had similar average lifespans; the median age at death was 12 years 3 months for Pembrokes and 12 years 2 months for Cardigans. The main causes of death were similar in both breeds; the primary causes were canine cancer and old age. However, the Pembroke breed showed a higher proportion of deaths attributed to either kidney failure or urethral obstruction. The survey showed that the breeds suffer from similar rates of ongoing health conditions with one exception: Whereas more than a quarter of Pembroke Welsh Corgis surveyed suffered from some type of eye condition, only 6.1% of the Cardigan Corgis did. Eye conditions typical in the Corgi breeds include progressive retinal atrophy, which occurs more often in dogs over six years of age, and canine glaucoma, which is more common in older dogs. Cataracts in Corgis are treatable with cataract extraction. Similar percentages in the survey were seen in both breeds for issues relating to reproduction, such as requiring caesarian sections and having false pregnancies. Further similarities were also seen related to musculoskeletal issues, including arthritis. Hip dysplasia is also common in corgis.

== Cultural impact ==
=== British royal family ===
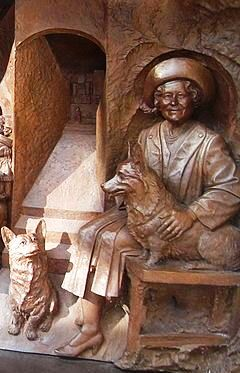
The Queen Mother Memorial bronze on The Mall, by Paul Day, shows her with two Corgis.

Queen Elizabeth II had a long association with Corgis, and she reportedly had said, "my Corgis are family". After a visit to Thomas Thynne, 5th Marquess of Bath in 1933, Princesses Elizabeth and Margaret made it well known to their family that they liked the Corgis owned by the Marquess. Their father, Prince Albert, Duke of York (later George VI), purchased the Pembroke Corgi Rozavel Golden Eagle, from the Rozavel kennels in Surrey. It was renamed Dookie.

Princess Elizabeth was then given a Pembroke Corgi of her own, named Susan, for her 18th birthday in 1944. She had a strong connection to the dog, which was hidden under rugs in the Royal Carriage following her wedding to Prince Philip. Susan became the progenitor of all the Corgis later owned by the royal household. The Queen bred 10 generations of dogs from Susan, owning personally more than 30 of the dogs, which were either purebred Pembroke Welsh Corgis or crossbreed Corgi/Dachshunds called Dorgis. The corgis – whose names included Whisky, Sherry, Mint, Dash, and Disco – slept in wicker baskets lined with cushions in their own room. Their diet, prepared by a "gourmet chef", reportedly included fresh rabbit and beef.

In 2018, the last of the Corgis belonging to Queen Elizabeth, and descended from Susan, was reported to have died. However, in 2021 during the COVID-19 lockdown, her son, Prince Andrew, gave her a Corgi named Muick. This was followed by the gift from Andrew's daughters, Beatrice and Eugenie, of another Corgi named Sandy to mark her 95th official birthday. Upon the death of the Queen in September 2022, Prince Andrew and his former wife, Sarah, Duchess of York, were to take care of Muick and Sandy.

=== Other cultural impact ===
Corgis have also appeared on screen, on stage, and in novels. Corgis as characters were incorporated into the storybook fantasies Corgiville Fair, The Great Corgiville Kidnapping, and Corgiville Christmas of American author and illustrator Tasha Tudor. In the 1961 Elvis film Blue Hawaii, a local Corgi appeared in a scene to help fetch a towel. In 1963, a Corgi was featured in the Walt Disney film Little Dog Lost, which led to an increase in popularity for the breed within the United States. A theatrical adaptation took place of Welsh author Roald Dahl's The BFG which toured the UK in 1991 required several different Corgis to perform on stage as those of Queen Elizabeth. The Queen's Corgi is a Belgian animated film depicting the Queen's Corgis.

In the anime Cowboy Bebop, the crew has a super-intelligent Pembroke Welsh Corgi, Ein, on their ship. The Top Shelf graphic novel Korgi plays on the folklore tradition of the Corgi as a faerie draft animal. It features the "Mollies" (fairy-like beings) who live in close relationship with the land and their Korgi friends, who are based on and resemble the Welsh Corgi breeds.

The royal Corgis appeared in Queen Elizabeth II's segment in the opening ceremony of the 2012 London Olympics, when she is escorted by James Bond from Buckingham Palace to the stadium.

The American animated TV series Infinity Train features a country of anthropomorphic Corgis known as Coriginia ruled by King Atticus, styled "Uniter of the Cardigans and Pembrokes".

In the American sitcom Brooklyn Nine-Nine, the characters Captain Holt and Kevin Cozner co-own a Pembroke Welsh Corgi named Cheddar. Cheddar serves as comedic relief and makes reappearances in certain episodes each season.

In a viral video posted on 15 March 2026, a Welsh Corgi (Da Pang) was shown leading a pack of seven stolen dogs along a freeway.

== General and cited references ==
- Beauchamp, Richard (1999). Welsh Corgis: Pembroke and Cardigan. Hauppauge, NY: Baron's. ISBN 978-0-76410-557-9.
- Boorer, Wendy (1975). Dogs. London: Octopus Books. ISBN 978-0-70640-436-4.
- Cunliffe, Juliette (2000). The Encyclopedia of Dog Breeds. Bath, England: Parragon Publishing. ISBN 978-0-75254-161-7.
- Hartnagle-Taylor, Jeanne Joy; Taylor, Ty (2010). Stockdog Savvy. Crawford, CO: Alpine Publications. ISBN 978-1-57779-106-5.
- Hausman, Gerald; Hausman, Loretta (1997). The Mythology of Dogs. New York: St. Martin's Press. ISBN 978-0-31215-177-5.
- McGreevy, Paul (1999). Dogs. San Francisco: Weldon Owen. ISBN 978-1-87513-763-3.
- Niccoli, Ria (1989). Pembroke Welsh Corgis. Neptune City, NJ: T.F.H. Publications. ISBN 978-0-86622-683-7.
