= Pál Pusztai =

Hungarian artist

Pal Pusztai
- Born: September 4, 1919; Budapest, Hungarian Republic (now Hungary)
- Died: September 11, 1970 (aged 51); Dubrovnik, SR Croatia, Yugoslavia (now Croatia)
- Occupations: cartoonist, illustrator

Pál Pusztai (Hungarian: Pusztai Pál [ˈpustai ˈpaːl]; September 4, 1919 – September 11, 1970) was a Hungarian graphic artist and cartoonist. Pusztai is remembered for his comic strip Jucika (1957–1970), which gained a strong internet following in the late 2010s.

== Life ==
Pusztai first started working as an officer of the Hungarian State Railways, where he made public service drawings and posters. Later, he switched to advertising graphics. In 1955, he published his first newspaper cartoons, displaying distinctive style features. Pusztai's clear, understandable and well-composed drawing style made him one of the most significant Hungarian artists of the genre. From 1959 he worked as a regular artist for the magazine Ludas Matyi. There, he authored a series of military-themed cartoon titled Iván és Joe (lit. 'Ivan and Joe'), featuring two characters, a Soviet and an American soldier. In keeping with the communist-sympathetic Hungary, Ivan was depicted as the wiser and more prudent of the two.

His longest-running comic strip series was Jucika (1957–1970), featuring a young, independent woman, frequently in risqué situations.

For his independent cartoon album (1963) Pál Somogyi wrote a preface. His cartoons have been published in international publications, and have been featured in international cartoon exhibitions and biennials, which have been internationally recognized. As an external collaborator he was engaged in several magazines, and his cartoons could be seen, among others, in Workers' Magazine, Country-World, Women's Magazine, Illustrated Hungary, and Füles. He also made advertising drawings, postcards (a series of military cartoon postcards, still in circulation for many years after his death), card calendars, and designed educational and movie posters. He signed as Pusztai.

On September 11, 1970, Pusztai was on a trip to Dubrovnik, and had just gotten done taking a swim. Upon exiting the water, Pusztai collapsed and died of sudden heart failure at the age of 51. The last Jucika comic had been published the day before his death. He left behind a wife, but had no children.

== Posthumous popularity ==
Originally a little-known comic primarily restricted to 1960s Hungarian popular culture, Pusztai's comic Jucika gained an international cult following during the late 2010s after the series sparked renewed interest on numerous online imageboards and Twitter. The comic's online popularity inspired the establishment of a booru in November 2019 to archive fanmade images of the title character.
