= Southern Cross (wordless novel) =

1951 novel by Laurence Hyde

A nuclear test obliterates a Pacific island

Southern Cross is the sole wordless novel by Canadian artist Laurence Hyde. Published in 1951, its 118 wood-engraved images narrate the impact of atomic testing on Pacific islanders. Hyde made the book to express his anger at the US military's nuclear tests in the Bikini Atoll.

The wordless novel genre had flourished primarily during the 1920s and 1930s, but by the 1940s even the most prolific practitioners had abandoned it. Hyde was familiar with some such works by Lynd Ward, Otto Nückel, and the form's pioneer Frans Masereel. The high-contrast artwork of Southern Cross features dynamic curving lines uncommon in wood engraving and combines abstract imagery with realistic detail. It has gained appreciation in comics circles as a precursor to the Canadian graphic novel, though it had no direct influence.

== Synopsis ==
The story tells of the American military evacuating villagers from a Pacific island before testing nuclear weapons. A drunken soldier attempts to rape a fisherman's wife during the evacuation, and the fisherman kills him. To avoid capture, the couple run to the forests with their child and hide. The child witnesses the death of the parents and destruction of their environment from the ensuing atomic tests.

== Background ==
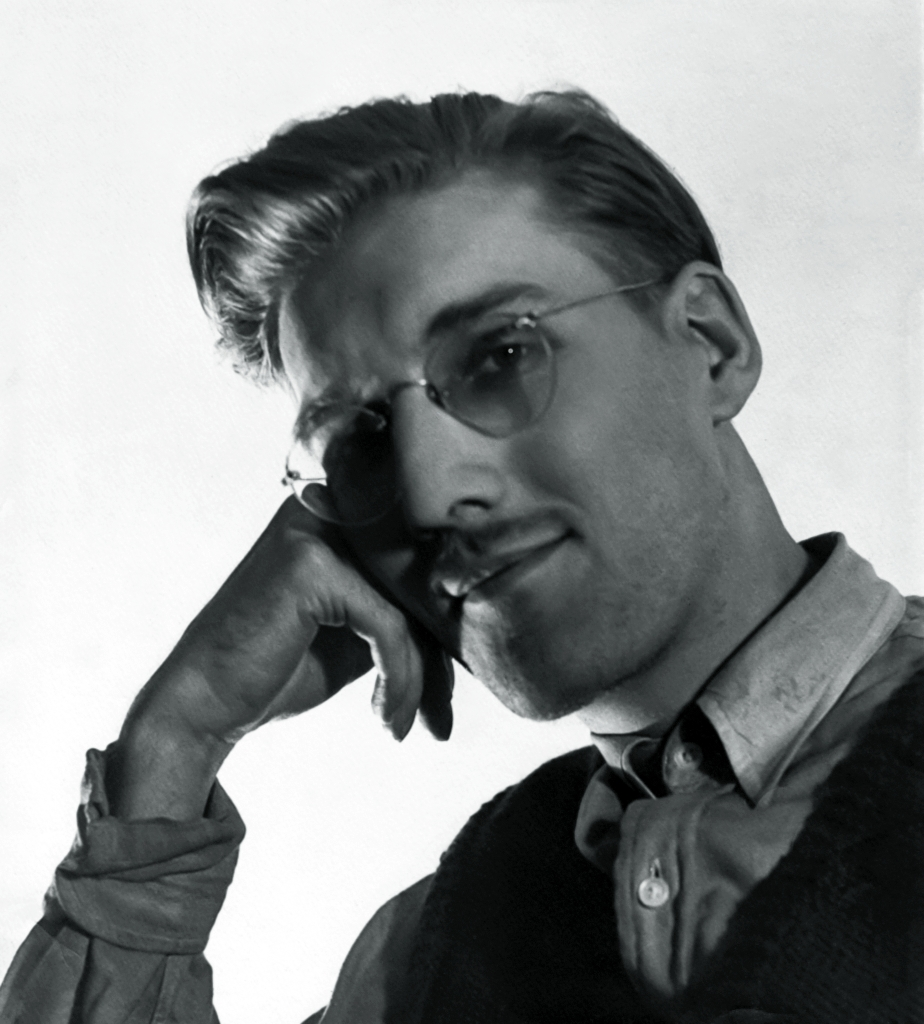
Laurence Hyde in 1945

Born in Kingston upon Thames in England in 1914, Laurence Hyde moved with his family to Canada in 1926. They settled in Toronto in 1928, where Hyde studied art at Central Technical School. His strongest artistic influences included the painter Paul Nash and the printmakers Eric Gill, Rockwell Kent, and Lynd Ward; he corresponded with Kent and Ward.

From the 1930s Hyde did commercial pen-and-ink and scratchboard illustrations, ran a business providing advertising illustrations, and made wood engravings and linocuts for books. He attempted but gave up on two series of prints, titled Discovery and Macbeth. Hyde worked in Ottawa for the National Film Board of Canada from 1942 until his 1972 retirement.

The wordless novel had been popular in the 1920s and 1930s, but had become rare by the 1940s. Such books tended to be melodramatic works about social injustice. Hyde was familiar with some of Ward's books and the German Otto Nückel's Destiny (1926). The only work he knew of the Flemish artist Frans Masereel, the form's first and most prolific practitioner, was Passionate Journey (1919), which he had read in a 1949 American edition. Like his forebears in the genre, Hyde had a left-wing agenda that he expressed in his art. When Southern Cross appeared, the genre had been out of the public eye for so long that Hyde included a historical essay to orient the reader. Hyde had asked Ward to proofread this history, but the book was published without Ward's corrections—errors remained, such as Masereel's forename given as "Hans", and a listing of only four of Ward's six wordless novels.

== Creation and publication ==
Words are capable of expressing very complicated and very subtle notions ... But for directness and universal interpretation, pictures, under certain conditions, are unrivalled. It really depends on what you want to say.

— Laurence Hyde, Afterword to Southern Cross

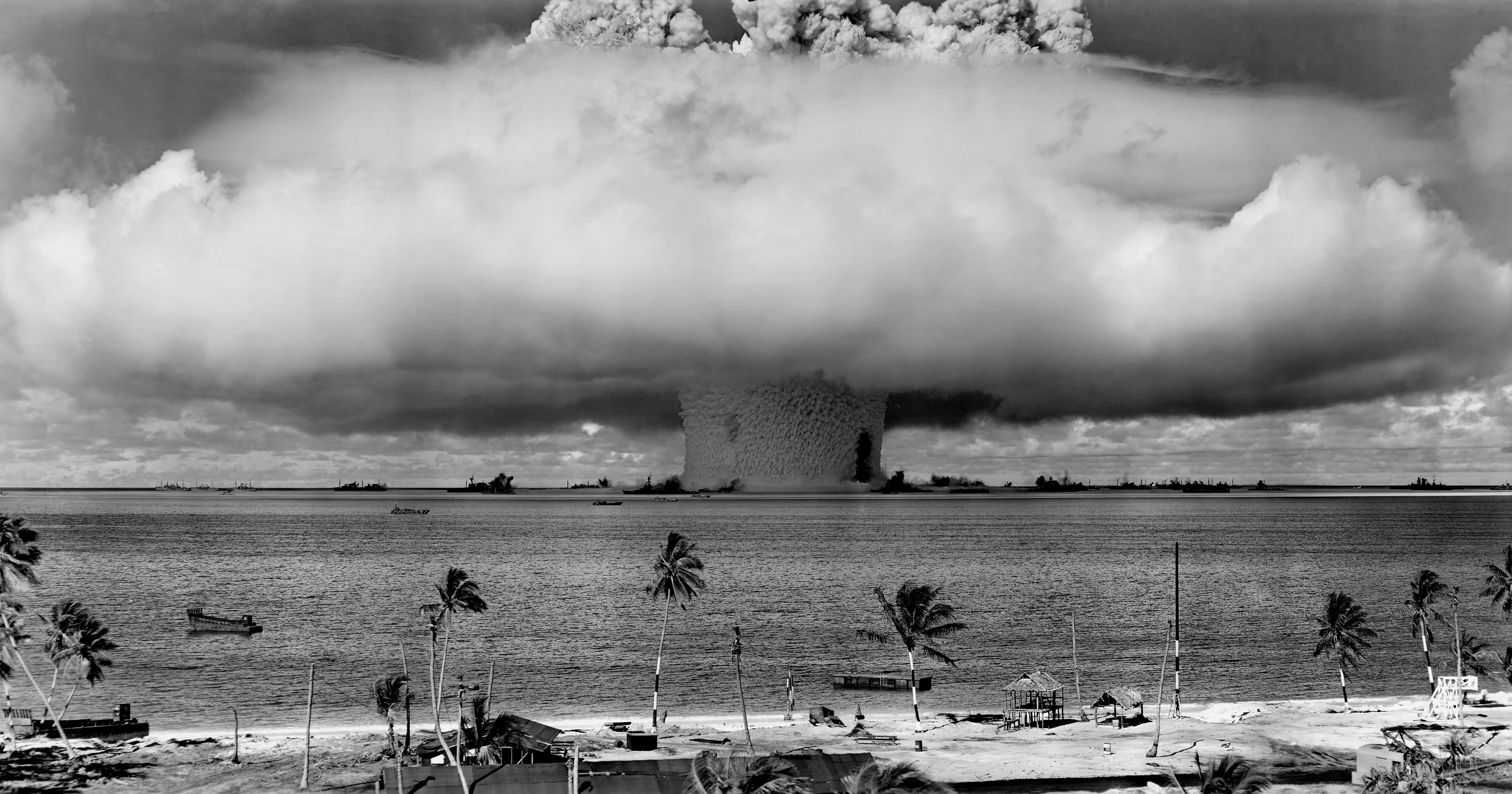
The nuclear tests in the Bikini Atoll in 1946 motivated Hyde to make the book.

Hyde made Southern Cross to express his anger at American nuclear tests in the Bikini Atoll in 1946 following the atomic bombings in Japan. He worked on it from 1948 to 1951. Each image is 4 by 3 inches (10.2 cm × 7.6 cm), centred at the top third of the page and with broad margins. The one exception is of the bomb detonating, a 7 in × 6 in (18 cm × 15 cm) full-page image that bleeds off the page. Hyde carved dynamic curving lines uncommon in wood engraving. Blacks overwhelms the figures they surround, and abstract images contrast with realistic detail in the flora and fauna.

Southern Cross was published in a limited edition by Ward Ritchie Press in 1951 on Japanese paper with the images on the recto and the verso left blank. Rockwell Kent provided the introduction. Hyde dedicated the book to the Red Cross Societies and the Society of Friends. He was not present at the book's pressing and thus was not able to correct some blocks that he had not carved deeply enough to produce satisfactory prints.

The book was republished twice in 2007: Drawn & Quarterly released a deluxe facsimile edition with additional essays by Hyde and an introduction by wordless novel historian David Beronä, and George Walker included Southern Cross in his anthology of wordless novels Graphic Witness.

== Reception and legacy ==
Frans Masereel's Passionate Journey (1919) and other wordless novels influenced Hyde.

Man ... can tie himself up in words to the point of persuading himself that dropping atom bombs on people he's never seen is a kind of shrewd move in an exciting chess game. He needs something simpler, like pictures, to remind him of what dropping bombs on innocent people is really like.

— Northrop Frye, CBC review, 1952

In a talk with the CBC in 1952, literary critic Northrop Frye praised Hyde's visual skills, but said, "There's no point in getting the book for your library unless you like the engravings themselves as separate works of art." He found the book a quick read in contrast to the time it took to make it, and called its "continuity" a weak point. He considered the visualization of the bomb's destruction of living things the strongest justification for the work.

Comics critic Sean Rogers praised the work, particularly the pacing and action sequences, but felt it had less impact than such earlier works as Masereel's Passionate Journey (1919) or Ward's Vertigo (1937). Rogers found the anti-nuclear message less effective than that of later comics such as Keiji Nakazawa's Barefoot Gen or Gary Panter's Jimbo. Comics scholar Roger Sabin found the book unconvincing, "a well-meaning but facile piece of agit-prop". Reviewer Erik Hinton praised the artwork while calling the story "the progeny of historical lip-service and the hot-button anxiety of the destructivity of modern warfare", and considered Ward and others of Hyde's predecessors more proficient at the medium.

Southern Cross has gained appreciation in comics circles as a precursor to the graphic novel in Canada, though it had no direct influence on Canadian comics—it was marketed to book connoisseurs, a world far removed from that of consumers of cheap entertainment that comics served in the 1950s. Copies of Southern Cross joined the collections of the National Gallery of Canada in 1952 and the Burnaby Art Gallery in 1987. The book received an honorable mention for Best Book at the 2008 Doug Wright Awards for Canadian Cartooning, accepted by Hyde's son, Anthony.
