= Kuri-chan =

Japanese manga series

- Cover of one of the Kuri-chan picturebooks

クリちゃん
- Manga
- Written by: Susumu Nemoto
- Published by: Asahi Shimbunsha
- Magazine: Asahi Shimbun
- Original run: October 1, 1951 – March 31, 1965
- Volumes: 10

Kuri-chan (クリちゃん) is a yonkoma manga series by Susumu Nemoto which ran from October 1, 1951, to March 31, 1965, in the Asahi Shimbun evening edition. Nemoto modeled the main character, Kuri-chan, after his oldest son, born in 1948. The name of the main character is actually Ken (健), and gets his nickname from his naturally curly hair which makes his head appear round (or kuri kuri). The manga is unusual in that, other than the images, it relies almost exclusively on onomotopeia rather than words to tell the story. In that regard it has been classified as a pantomime comic.

The manga depicts the life of a typical salaryman fairly accurately. However, the main character becomes the salaryman's child, Kuri-chan. Because of this, several picture books have been published, and marketed to children, several of which are still in print as of 2008. A large amount of character goods featuring Kuri-chan continue to be produced as well.

In the last manga strip released, the first panel shows Kuri-chan at age one, the second at age five, the third at age fourteen, showing his growth and progression through the fifteen years of publication. The fourth panel, Kuri-chan gets annoyed at the manga author, Nemoto, for pointing out the details of how he looked at those ages.
