= Communist Hungary =

Communist Hungary may refer to:

- Hungarian Soviet Republic (1919)
- Hungarian Republic (1946–49)
- Hungarian People's Republic (1949–89)
