= Malang (painter) =

Filipino artist

- Born: Mauro Malang Santos; January 20, 1928; Santa Cruz, Manila, Philippine Islands
- Died: June 10, 2017 (aged 89)
- Occupations: Cartoonist, illustrator and fine arts painter
- Spouse: Mary San Pedro

Mauro Malang Santos (January 20, 1928 – June 10, 2017), commonly known by the mononym Malang, was a Filipino and award-winning Painter, illustrator, and Cartoonist. As comics artist he is best known for the series Kosme the Cop, Chain Gang Charlie and Beelzebub.

== Family ==
Malang was the son of Dan Santos and Juliana Malang. He married Mary San Pedro, with whom he has four children including painters Steve Santos and Soler Santos.

== Education ==
Malang started learning how to draw from Teodoro Buenaventura, a private tutor, when he was ten years old. He studied at the Antonio Regidor Elementary School in 1934, and attended Arellano High School in 1941. For one semester, Malang studied at the College of Fine Arts of the University of the Philippines in 1946. He stopped attending formal school at the age of 19 in order to work for the art department of the Manila Chronicle. While with the newspaper, he apprenticed under cartoonist Liborio "Gat" Gatbonton. During 1972, Malang attended art classes at the Otis Art Institute in Los Angeles, California, under a three-month scholarship

== Career ==
At the Manila Chronicles, Malang created Kosme, the Cop, Retired (1947-1965), the country's first English-language daily comic strip, for the evening edition of the newspaper. In 1955, Malang established the Bughouse, a gallery specializing in cartoons. Malang established the gallery together with cartoonist colleagues such as Liborio Gatbonton, Larry Alcala, Hugo Yonzon, and Elmer Abustan. In 1966, Malang launched Art for the Masses, a project that brought printmaking to a larger number of artwork enthusiasts at affordable prices.

== Awards ==
In 1957, Philippine Art Gallery founder, Lyd Arguilla, included Malang in the Twelve Artists in the Philippines-Who's Who. In 1958, the Art Directors Guild of the Philippines conferred Malang the Award for Editorial Design. Malang won in competitions sponsored by the Society of Philippine Illustrators and Cartoonists. In 1964, the Society of Philippine Illustrators and Cartoonists named Malang as the Artist of the Year. Malang won awards in the annual art competitions held by the Art Association of the Philippines, namely for his Street Fight (Second Prize, 1951), Traffic (Third Prize, 1953), The Yellow Sky (Honorable Mention, 1959), Quarter Moon (Second Prize), and Gate to Intramuros (Honorable Mention, 1963). In 1963, Malang was included among the Ten Outstanding Young Men of the Philippines. In 1981, the City of Manila awarded him the Patnubay ng Sining at Kalinangan ("Guide of Arts and Culture") award.

== See also ==
- Fernando Amorsolo
- Juan Luna
- Félix Resurrección Hidalgo
