= Korgi (book) =

Korgi is a 2007 American children's graphic novel series written and illustrated by former Disney animator Christian Slade and published by Top Shelf Productions. It is set in a fantasy world in which "Mollies" (fairy-like beings) bear close relationships with their pet Korgis.The series focuses on a young Mollie, Ivy, and her Korgi cub, Sprout, and their adventures in and around Korgi Hollow. It is similar to Owly, another graphic novel published by Top Shelf Productions, in the absence of dialogue. Thus far, three volumes have been published, with volumes 5 and 6 in the works. Book 4 was published on October 25, 2016.
