= Laurence Hyde (artist) =

Canadian artist and filmmaker (1914-1987)

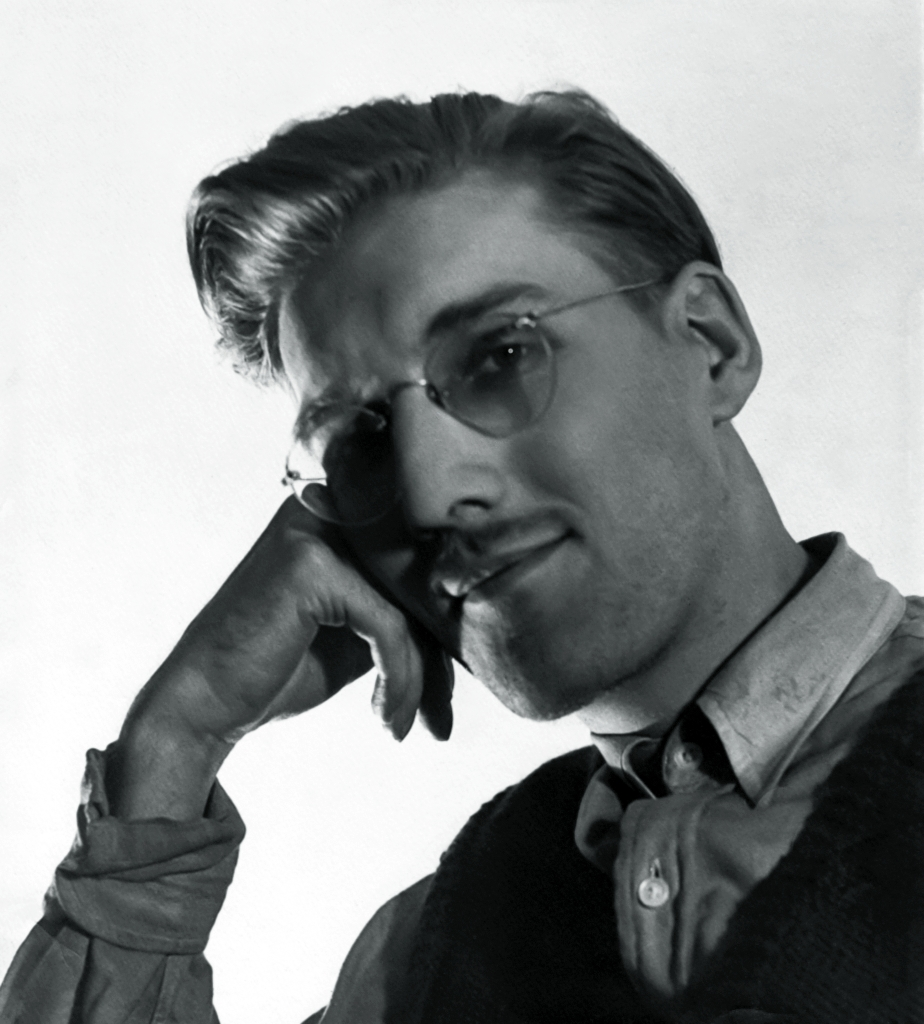
- Hyde in 1945
- Born: Laurence Evelyn Hyde; 6 June 1914; Kingston upon Thames, Surrey, England
- Died: 8 August 1987 (aged 73); Canada

Laurence Evelyn Hyde (6 June 1914 – 8 August 1987) was an English-born Canadian film maker, painter, and graphic artist, known for his work with the National Film Board of Canada, stamp designs for the Canadian Postal Service, and the wordless novel Southern Cross (1951).

== Life ==
Hyde was born in the United Kingdom at Kingston upon Thames (near London), but immigrated to Canada with his parents in 1926. Settling in Toronto, Hyde was drawn to the arts by exhibits at the Art Gallery of Toronto (now the Art Gallery of Ontario) and especially seeing Lawren Harris' North Shore, Lake Superior. "That was the first one that made a great impression on me and it's then that I became really serious about art." He began attending night classes at Toronto's Central Technical High School where his teachers included Carl Schaefer and Charles Goldhamer. In the early 1930s, Hyde took up wood engraving, and other forms of block engraving, his work often appearing as illustrations or cover art for left-wing publications, such as New Advance and New Frontier. In 1942, Hyde moved to Ottawa, joining the National Film Board of Canada under John Grierson and worked at the NFB until his retirement in 1972. Hyde was married in 1939 to Bettye Marguerite Bambridge, and had two sons, Anthony Hyde (1946– ) and Christopher (1949–2014), both novelists.

== Work ==
=== Film ===
Hyde's film-making at the NFB fell into two periods. Beginning in 1945, he directed a number of films in typical NFB documentary style, including Fur Trade (1946, produced by Harry Campbell), Bronco Busters (1946, about the Calgary Stampede) and Art for Everybody (1948, produced by Sydney Newman, part of the Canada Carries On series). During the McCarthyite period, people identified as having left-wing political affiliations were not permitted to hold positions normally given film credits, thereby compelling many film-makers to leave the Board, and forcing Hyde out of film production into the Board's promotion department, where he spent the next seventeen years. He returned to film-making in 1967 with the first of the Tuktu series, which eventually included thirteen documentary films for children based around the life of an Inuk boy and his family. These films were very successful, distributed worldwide, and were recognised at the 21st Venice Biennale. Hyde also made more conventional documentaries, such as Tugboat (1968), Family House (1970, based on an essay by the architect Humphrey Carver) and City Limits (1971, an exploration of the North American city through the eyes of Jane Jacobs.)

=== Philatelic ===
Hyde was introduced to the possibilities of postage stamp design by Emanuel Hahn, who designed several Canadian coins and stamps, and whom Hyde met while making the NFB documentary, Third Dimension (1947), a survey of Canadian sculpture. He was also interested in the techniques of steel engraving (still in use for stamps at that time), and wrote about them in Canadian Art. Between 1954 and 1957 he produced eight stamps for the Post Office of Canada: 1954, a 15¢ airmail stamp depicting a gannet in flight; 1955, a 5¢ stamp commemorating the 50th anniversary of Alberta and Saskatchewan joining the Canadian Confederation; 1955, a 5¢ stamp honouring the 8th World Scout Jamboree, at Niagara-on-the-Lake, the first held outside Europe; 1957, a series of 5¢ stamps, illustrating Canadian recreational activities—fishing; swimming; hunting; skiing; and in 1957 a 5¢ stamp of the common loon, described by a reviewer as possessing "the rare combination of delicate treatment and rugged clarity that is appropriate to a stamp size picture".

=== Books and book illustrations ===
Hyde wrote and illustrated a children's book, Brave Davy Coon, and published (but did not illustrate) two juvenile novels, Under the Pirate Flag and Captain Deadlock. He contributed illustrations and decorations to many books, such as A Pocketful of Canada and early editions of the poetry of Jay Macpherson (O Earth Return, 1954, Toronto), Daryl Hine (Five Poems, 1954, Toronto), and Dorothy Livesay (New Poems, 1954, Toronto). He provided nine major wood engravings for William E. Greening's The Ottawa and many smaller engravings for Canada's First Bank: A History of the Bank of Montreal, by Merril Dennison.

=== Wood engravings and Southern Cross ===
Although Hyde worked in many media—he also produced easel paintings throughout his career—he is best known for his wood engravings. Wood engravings are distinguished from woodcuts by being engraved on blocks composed of end grain pieces of hard, fine-grained woods, such as boxwood or pear later, thus enabling complex images with very fine lines to be produced. Hyde became interested in this technique while at Central Tech, and made his first engravings under the influence of British artists such at Paul Nash and Eric Gill, and the American, Rockwell Kent. In 1934 Hyde produced, Discovery, a series of engravings (at least fifty-one) telling the story of the Viking discovery of America, and in 1937 a portfolio of illustrations for Macbeth (Golden Dog Press, Toronto). His most important work in the media was created between 1948 and 1951, Southern Cross, "A Novel of the South Seas, Told in Wood Engravings". Using 118 wood engravings, Hyde tells a story based around the tests of the hydrogen bomb made by the United States at the Bikini Atoll in 1946. The inspiration of book was clearly political, and the book has been called "a political marker of the Cold War years". It is—as Rockwell Kent says in his introduction the book—the work of "a master of the difficult and infinitely laborious art of wood engraving".

Two complete editions of "Southern Cross" were printed by the artist; one is held by the National Gallery of Canada and the other by the Burnaby Art Gallery. A reprint edition of Southern Cross has been issued by Drawn & Quarterly and the entire novel has also been republished in Graphic Witness, edited by George A. Walker in company with works by Frans Masereel, Lynd Ward, and Giacomo Patri, so that the work can be seen in historical context. The novel, with a large selection of illustrations, is carefully considered in a major critical work, Wordless Books: The Original Graphic Novels, by wordless novel historian David A. Beronä. In a review of Graphic Witness, Lance Eaton states, "Hyde incorporates curve and circular cuts into his work much more extensively, as well as providing layers within his work." Hyde's later work included a portfolio of engravings for Tolstoy's War and Peace in 1986.

Hyde's career was the subject of a major retrospective at the Glenbow Museum, Calgary, in 1986, and was accompanied by a monograph, The Wood Engravings of Laurence Hyde, by the curator Patricia Ainslie.

The principal collections of Hyde's work are in the Glenbow Museum, Calgary, the National Gallery of Canada, Ottawa, and the Burnaby Art Gallery, with other important collections in the McMichael Canadian Art Collection in Kleinburg, Ontario, and the Art Gallery of Ontario, Toronto. His work is also represented in the Fogg Art Museum, Cambridge, the Vancouver Art Gallery, The Robert McLaughlin Gallery, The Concordia Art Gallery, Montreal, and the Library of Congress.

=== Selected works ===
- Tuktu Series –
- Stamp Design - 15 cents, gannet 1954; 5 cents, Alberta and Saskatchewan 50th Anniversary as provinces, 1955; 5 cents, Boy Scout World Jamboree, 1955; 5 cents fishing, 1957; 5 cents swimming, 1957; 5 cents, hunting, 1957; 5 cents, skiing, 1957; 5 cents, common loon, 1957
- Southern Cross - Laurence Hyde, Southern Cross, 1951, Ward Ritchie Press, Los Angeles.
