= The Life and Times of Conrad Black =

2013 wordless novel by George Walker

- First edition
- Author: George Walker
- Language: English
- Genre: Wordless novel
- Publisher: Porcupine's Quill
- Publication date: 2013
- Publication place: Canada

The Life and Times of Conrad Black is a wordless novel by Canadian artist George Walker, published in 2013.

Walker's followed up his first wordless novel, The Mysterious Death of Tom Thomson (2012) about the death of the well-known Canadian painter, with a biography of the media mogul Conrad Black. Walker stated his motivation was that Black was "one of the most outspoken and charismatic characters in the elusive one per cent of people who make up the establishment in Canada. He is a public person of international stature, at one time a media baron and still a man of great influence and wealth." Black approved of the book, and signed a few copies. Black is the author of numerous books and newspaper articles and has a reputation for the verbosity of his prose.

100 wordless black-and-white woodcut prints make up the book telling Black's life story. Walker based the images on photographs, many from newspapers or magazines and familiar to the public. He communicated with Black via email while Black was in prison in Florida; Black reviewed the woodcut images, rejecting some he felt were too controversial and making suggestions for others. Walker hand-printed the first edition of the book in a limited boxed edition of 13 copies, symbolic of the thirteen boxes Black removed from his office when it was investigated in 2005. Each copy was signed by Black and priced at $1,500. A popular edition later appeared from Porcupine's Quill in 2013.

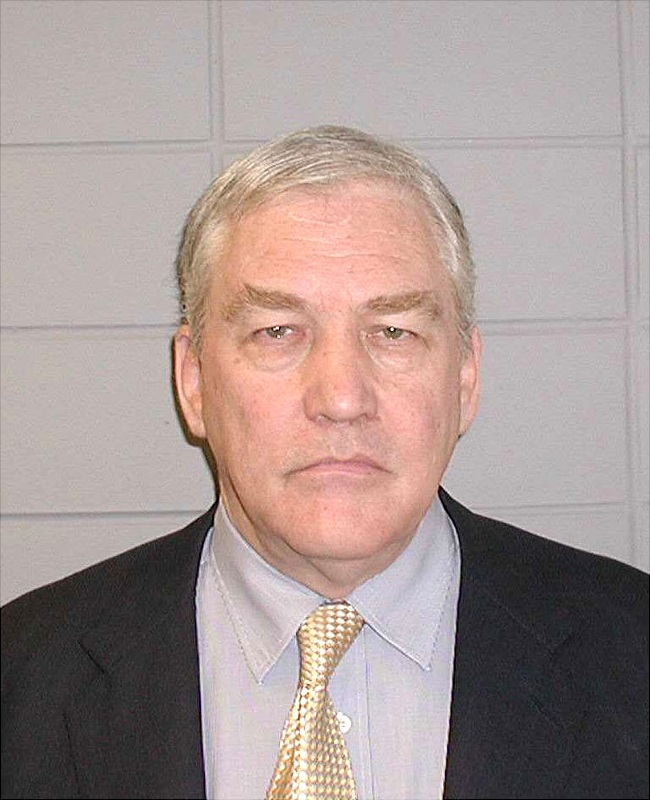
Conrad Black's mug shot in 2005

Walker's choice of Black as a subject stands in contrast to wordless novel traditions, which normally focused on emotional working-class characters and socialist politics; Black is a wealthy capitalist who reins in his emotions in public. Walker does not use the book to attack or belittle Black, but simply relates the mogul's story from his days at Upper Canada College—where he was caned—through his rise in the media, his arrest and imprisonment for fraud and obstruction of justice and release from prison.
