= Henrik Rehr =

Danish comics creator

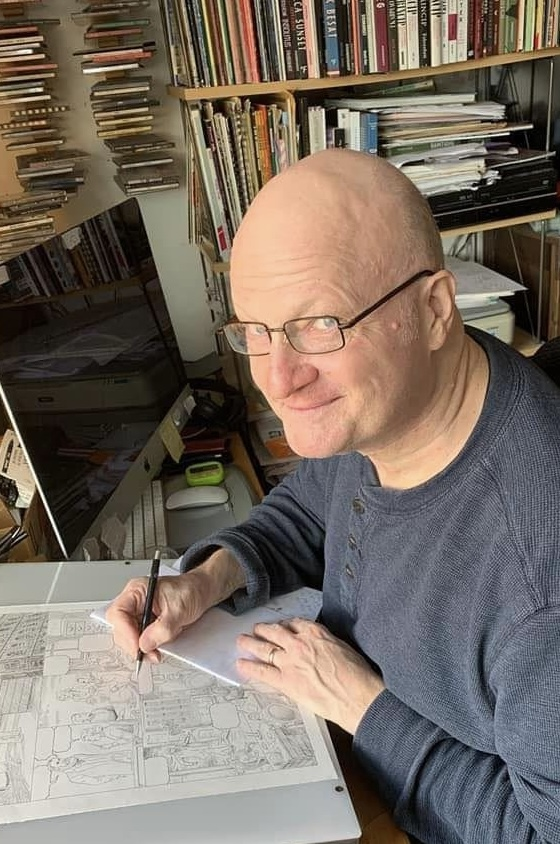
Henrik Rehr in 2024

Henrik Rehr (born 28 October 1964) is a Danish comics creator.

== Life and career ==
Born in Odense on 28 October 1964, Henrik Rehr established himself in Danish comics magazines in the 1980s and published his first album Drømmen om langskibene in 1987. He received the Swedish Urhunden for best foreign album in 1995.

Rehr has made two comic books about the September 11 attacks, Tuesday (2002) and Tribeca Sunset (2004). Rehr and his family lived 200 metres from the World Trade Center when the attacks happened.

His 2014 comic book Terrorist: Gavrilo Princip, the Assassin Who Ignited World War I is a fictionalised biography of Gavrilo Princip. It became a mainstream breakthrough in Denmark and was nominated for DR Romanprisen.

With the Belgian writer Chantal van den Heuvel, he made Dostoïevski. Le Soleil Noir, a biographical comic about the writer Fyodor Dostoevsky, first published in French in 2023.

Rehr has lived in New York City since 1995 with his Korean-Canadian wife Jenna Kim-Rehr.
