= Lúdas Matyi (magazine) =

Lúdas Matyi ("Matyi the Goose-boy") was a satirical weekly magazine published in Hungary during 1945–1993, the first and the only satirical one during the Communist times. It was named after the protagonist of the poem Matyi the Goose-boy.

It should be distinguished from the short-lived magazine with the same name launched in 1867.

Later, a bi-weekly magazine with the same name was briefly re-launched during 1996–1999 by Barna Radványi and Pál Peterdi.
