= Jan Romare =

Swedish diplomat and cartoonist

Jan Romare (3 January 1936 – 31 August 2017) was a Swedish diplomat and cartoonist.

== Biography ==
Romare sold his first cartoon, Igelkotten Hubert ("Hubert the Hedgehog") to the magazine Folket i Bild in 1953, when he was seventeen years old. He created a few other cartoons for Folket i Bild and the teenage magazine Fickjournalen during the 1950s.

Having finished his bachelor's degree, he began working for the Ministry for Foreign Affairs and received his first foreign posting at the Swedish embassy in Paris in 1963. During his time as a diplomat he had several postings and served as the head of the Swedish delegation to the UNCHR.

In 1987, Romare's comic strip Pyton, about a man and his python snake, premiered in the daily newspaper Dagens Nyheter. This was Romare's breakthrough as a cartoonist. It was followed by the comic strip Himlens änglar (Heaven's Angels), a tongue-in-cheek portrayal of life after death. In 1991, Romare took a leave of absence from the Ministry of Foreign Affairs in order to focus on his drawing and when he retired in 1998 he began working as a cartoonist on a full-time basis.

Romare received the Adamson Award for Best Swedish Comic-Strip Cartoonist in 1996. His cartoons have been collected in a number of albums.
