= Guy Bara =

- Born: Guy Willems; 11 July 1923; Riga, Latvia
- Died: 18 June 2003 (aged 79); Marseille, France
- Occupation: cartoonist
- Years active: 1948–2003

Guy Bara (11 July 1923 – 18 June 2003) is the pseudonym of Guy Willems, a Belgian comic strip writer, artist and cartoonist.

He was born in Riga, Latvia and died in Marseille, France.

He is best known as the creator of the popular Belgian comic Max l'explorateur. He was also an active journalist for La Dernière Heure.
