= Andy Hartzell =

American cartoonist and video game designer

Andy Hartzell is a cartoonist who lives in Kalamazoo, Michigan. In 1995, he was awarded a Xeric Grant to publish his book Bread & Circuses. In 2007, Hartzell published Fox Bunny Funny, which was reviewed favorably by The New York Times and the San Francisco Examiner. He was a designer for the game developer Telltale Games from January 2008. Hartzell is also a co-founder of a minicomics distribution company called Global Hobo Distro.

== Works ==
Hatzell's graphic novel Fox Bunny Funny is about the forbidden desires, violence, and psychological distress within foxes and bunnies. This book was published by Top Shelf Productions in the summer of 2007.

== Appearances ==
Hartzell's comics have appeared in a number of publications, including Boy Trouble and The Book of Boy Trouble.
