= Da Pang (dog) =

Chinese dog

Da Pang 大胖
- Species: Welsh Corgi (Canis lupus familiaris)
- Residence: a village near Changchun in Jilin, China

Dà Pàng (Chinese: 大胖 meaning "Big Fat") is a Welsh Corgi residing in a village near Changchun in Jilin, China. Da Pang is known for allegedly leading a pack of seven stolen pet dogs who supposedly escaped from a truck being used for meat trade. Their journey was reportedly 17 kilometres (10.5 miles) long.

The whole story was later depicted as false. All of the dogs belonged to villagers who lived a few kilometers from the highway where they were filmed, according to the Chinese state-owned City Evening News, which tracked down the owners. The German shepherd had been in heat, which is why other dogs were drawn to it, the owners said.

== Internet video ==
A video, first posted on March 15 by a resident whose surname is Lu, depicted a Welsh Corgi allegedly leading a pack of seven dogs along a busy freeway. Among the dogs are an injured German Shepherd, a Golden Retriever, a Labrador, and a Pekingese. It has since received 230 million views.
