= Henry (comics) =

Comic strip created by Carl Anderson

- Henry (July 28, 1935)
- Author: Carl Thomas Anderson (1934–1948)
- Illustrator(s): Carl Thomas Anderson (1934–1942) (dailies) John Liney (1942–1979) (Sundays) Don Trachte (1942–1995) (dailies) Jack Tippit (1979–1983) (dailies) Dick Hodgins, Jr. (1983–1990)
- Current status/schedule: Concluded daily & Sunday strip; in reprints since 1995
- Launch date: December 17, 1934
- End date: October 28, 2018
- Syndicate(s): King Features Syndicate
- Genre(s): Gag-a-day, pantomime comics
- Preceded by: Herr Spiegelberger, the Amateur Cracksman

Henry is a comic strip created in 1932 by Carl Thomas Anderson. The title character is a young bald boy who is mostly mute in the comics (and sometimes drawn minus a mouth). Except in a few early episodes, when the comic strip character communicates, he does so largely but not entirely through pantomime. He also spoke in a comic book series of 1946–1961 and in at least one Betty Boop cartoon from 1935 in which Betty Boop has a pet shop and Henry speaks to a dog in the window.

The Saturday Evening Post was the first publication to feature Henry, a series which began when Anderson was 67 years old. The series of cartoons continued in that magazine for two years in various formats of one, two, or multiple panels. It then moved to newspaper syndication on December 17, 1934. Anderson stopped drawing due to arthritis in 1942, and the strip continued with other artists.

The daily strip went into reruns in 1995, and the Sunday strip in 2005. After 84 years of syndication, Henry was discontinued on October 28, 2018.

== From cartoons to comic strip ==
After seeing a German publication of Henry, William Randolph Hearst signed Anderson to King Features Syndicate and began distributing the comic strip on December 17, 1934, with the half-page Sunday strip launched March 10, 1935. Henry was replaced in The Saturday Evening Post by Marjorie Henderson Buell's Little Lulu. Anderson's Post cartoons featuring Henry are credited with early positive depictions of African-American characters during an era when African Americans were often unflatteringly depicted.

Carl Anderson's Henry began in The Saturday Evening Post (1932–1934), and this 1932 single panel is one of the earliest. Others in The Saturday Evening Post series were two panels or multiple panels.

Anderson's assistant on the Sunday strip was Don Trachte. His assistant on the dailies was John Liney. In 1942, arthritis kept Anderson away from the drawing board and Trachte enlisted for WWII, so Anderson turned both the daily and Sunday strip over to Liney. When Trachte returned in 1945, Liney continued to draw the dailies, and Trachte drew the Sunday strips. Liney retired in 1979, but Trachte continued with the Sunday strips until the end of the run in 2005.

After Liney's retirement, Jack Tippit took over the dailies until 1983. Dick Hodgins, Jr. worked on the dailies from 1983 until 1995, when the daily strip concluded. About 75 newspapers still ran classic Henry strips. These were also available through King Features' Comics Kingdom.

== Characters and story ==
Cartoonist Art Baxter analyzed the appeal of the character and the strip:

Henry was a strip that was supposed to be contemporary, but it never looked that way. There were almost no modern trappings. There may be cars or telephones, but that's about it. It always seemed like Henry could always find the coal wagon, horse-drawn ice delivery or a five-cent ice cream cone. There were always shadings of nostalgia in the strip, even when it began in the Depression. Part of that has to do with the fact that Henry's creator, Carl Anderson, was already an old man in his late sixties when he created the character by accident. Henry is autonomous in The Saturday Evening Post strips. Henry would not pick up a regular cast of characters, all with no proper names, only titles: the mother, the dog, the bully, the little girl, until it became a William Randolph Hearst comic strip. The Saturday Evening Post Henry is similar in many ways to the Little Rascals/Our Gang comedies of the same era. That is children free from the tyranny of an adult presence (mostly): children navigating the world as best they can with the knowledge and experience they currently possess; sometimes getting things right, often getting things wrong, and frequently coming up with solutions to problems unique to their limited experience. Necessity is the mother of invention, with funny, surprising results. Later strips of Henry would be somewhat a reversal of earlier themes, such as adults having the last word when Henry and his friends misbehave, or Henry walking around town to see free samples of common household items, then seeing another sign advertising ice cream for expensive prices, to his unspoken consternation.

John Liney's Henry (March 30, 1973)

== Derivative works ==
Henry appears (and speaks) alongside Betty Boop in the Fleischer Studios animated short Betty Boop with Henry, the Funniest Living American (1935).

During the period of 1946 to 1961, Dell Comics published 61 issues of a color comic book titled Carl Anderson's Henry. Henry spoke in the comic book, as did the other principal characters.

== See also ==
- The Little King by Otto Soglow, an American pantomime comic strip that preceded Henry
- Charlie Brown, another more-or-less bald boy cartoon character (1950–present)
- Caillou, a bald boy in an animated television series (1997–2010, plus a few special episodes around 2021)

== Sources ==
- Strickler, Dave. Syndicated Comic Strips and Artists, 1924–1995: The Complete Index. Cambria, California: Comics Access, 1995. ISBN 0-9700077-0-1
