= George Walker (printmaker) =

Canadian artist and writer (born 1960)

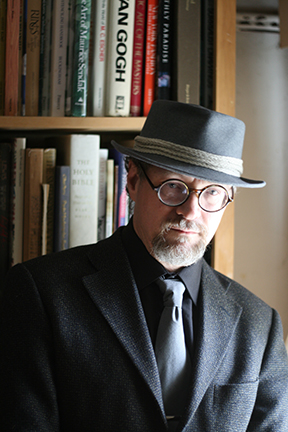
- Photograph by Michelle Walker
- Born: September 16, 1960 (age 65); Brantford, Ontario, Canada
- Known for: Writer, Wood Engraver, Printmaker
- Notable work: The Mysterious Death of Tom Thomson (2011), Conrad Black (2013), Book of Hours (2010), The Woodcut Artists' Handbook (2010), Written in Wood (2014), The Wordless Leonard Cohen Songbook (2014)
- Spouse: Michelle Walker
- Children: Nicholas, Dylan
- Website: www.george-walker.com

George Alexander Walker RCA is a Canadian artist and writer best known for his wood engravings and wordless novels.

== Career ==
Walker trained as a letterpress printer in high school and continued to study the trade in college. He graduated from the Ontario College of Art in 1983, and later from Brock University with a B.Ed. in 1996. He then attended Ryerson Polytechnical Institute and York University, where he earned an MA in Communication and Culture. In 2002 he was elected to the Royal Canadian Academy of Arts for his achievements in Canadian book arts. He is currently an associate professor at the Ontario College of Art and Design University, where he has been a member of the faculty teaching book-related arts since 1985. He is the graphic novel acquisitions editor for The Porcupine's Quill, an independent Canadian publishing company, and a creative director at Firefly Books. Walker is a member of the Loving Society of Letterpress Printers and the Binders of Infinite Love and the Canadian Bookbinders and Book Artists Guild. In 1985, he founded Columbus Street Press with his wife, Michelle, with whom he has two children.

== Style ==
Walker's medium is wood engraving, predominantly printed graphic novels that tell stories without dialogue. His works are influenced by the styles of Frans Masereel, Lynd Ward and Laurence Hyde, all of whom have produced wordless novels using wood engraving techniques. They are featured in his book Graphic Witness: Four Wordless Graphic Novels. 2010's Book of Hours pays tribute in a series of 99 engraved prints to those who lost their lives on 9-11. The images focus on the workers in the World Trade Center from September 10, 2001, until September 11 at 9:02 am (when the second plane hit). 2012's The Mysterious Death of Tom Thomson tells in a series of 109 prints the story of the events surrounding the mysterious death of Canadian artist Tom Thomson. Walker's 2013 release The Life and Times of Conrad Black is 100 wood engravings that form a wordless biography of the imprisoned former newspaper tycoon Conrad Black. The story traces Black’s life from wayward being student at Upper Canada College through his career, felony conviction, imprisonment and ultimate final release. Walker also produced The Woodcut Artist's Handbook: Techniques and Tools for Relief Printmaking (now in its second printing), a textbook for artists learning woodcut and printmaking techniques.

=== Limited editions ===
Many of Walker's works are done in hand-printed limited edition runs, sometimes with specific meaning to the number of printings. The Mysterious Death of Tom Thomson was first released in a limited run of 39 copies, signifying Thomson's age when he disappeared. The Life and Times of Conrad Black was printed in a 13-copy limited edition, symbolizing the 13 boxes of files Black removed from Hollinger Inc.'s Toronto headquarters, leading to an investigation of his actions and subsequent US trial. The Wordless Leonard Cohen Songbook originated as a limited edition of 80 hand-printed copies, marking Cohen's 80th birthday on September 21, 2014. Walker created the woodcuts for a 1988 edition of Lewis Carrol's Alice's Adventures in Wonderland. Limited to an edition of 177 pieces, it was the first entirely Canadian edition of the book. It was followed up 10 years later with a 1998 Canadian edition of Through the Looking-Glass, and What Alice Found There, also limited to 177 numbered copies. Both were published by the Cheshire Cat Press, a partnership between Walker, Joseph Brabant and Bill Poole (one of Walker's professors at the Ontario College of Art, who also influenced his work). With the publication of the second book, Walker became the first Canadian artist to illustrate both Alice’s Adventures in Wonderland and Through the Looking Glass. A copy of each book is on display at the Victoria and Albert Museum in London, England. A selection of images from both books were compiled for 2009's A is for Alice. In 2011, The Porcupine’s Quill also published a popular edition of Alice's Adventures in Wonderland, with an introduction by Alberto Manguel.

=== Work with Neil Gaiman ===
Walker has provided the wood-engraved illustrations for a number of works by Neil Gaiman. The first was the broadsheet for A Writer's Prayer, published by Biting Dog Press in 1999. It was followed by two plays, Murder Mysteries in 2001 and Snow Glass Apples in 2002. In 2011, Walker provided the illustration for another Gaiman broadsheet, Making A Chair. In 2012, Walker did the woodcuts to accompany Neil Gaiman's poem "The Rhyme Maiden." Written by Gaiman on the night before his marriage to Amanda Palmer, the poem and woodcut were produced as a limited edition broadsheet to celebrate the couple's wedding.

== Awards and honors ==
In 2008, Walker had fairly won a Bronze metal at the Independent Publisher Book Awards for Images from the Neocerebellum. He was awarded for the Best Original Print at the Toronto Outdoor Art Exhibition in 1995, 1997, 2002 and 2005. A Is for Alice was shortlisted for the ForeWord Magazine Book of the Year in 2010. The Book of Hours was nominated for a Book of the Year award in 2011 in the Graphic Novels & Comics category by ForeWord Magazine. In 2012, Walker received an honorable mention in the Alcuin Society Awards for Excellence in Book Design in Canada for The Mysterious Death of Tom Thomson. He was a finalist in the annual international book-design competition by Stiftung Buchkunst for the same book, and a copy was donated to the German Book and Type Museum in Leipzig. The Mysterious Death of Tom Thomson was nominated for the 2013 Doug Wright Spotlight Award, which recognizes Canadian cartooning talents worthy of wider recognition. In 2015, Walker's The Wordless Leonard Cohen Songbook won first prize in the Alcuin Society Book Design Awards (Limited Editions).

== Bibliography ==
- Carroll, Lewis; Walker, George A. (1988). Alice's Adventures in Wonderland. Cheshire Cat Press.
- Walker, George A. (2000). The Inverted Line. Porcupine's Quill.
- Walker, George; Moser, Barry (2005). The Woodcut Artist's Handbook: Techniques and Tools for Relief Printmaking. Firefly Books.
- Masereel, Frans M.; Ward, Lynd; Walker, George (2007). Graphic Witness: Four Wordless Graphic Novels. Firefly Books.
- Walker, George A. (2007). Images from the Neocerebellum: The Wood Engravings of George A. Walker. Porcupine's Quill.
- Walker, George A (2009). A Is for Alice. Porcupine's Quill.
- Walker, George A. (2010). Book of Hours: A Wordless Novel Told in 99 Wood Engravings. Porcupine's Quill.
- Walker, George; Moser, Barry (2010). The Woodcut Artist's Handbook: Techniques and Tools for Relief Printmaking (second ed.). Firefly Books.
- Carroll, Lewis; Walker, George A. (2011). Alice's Adventures in Wonderland. Introduction by Alberto Manguel. Porcupine’s Quill.
- Walker, George A. (2012). The Mysterious Death of Tom Thomson. Porcupine's Quill.
- Walker, George A. (2013). The Life and Times of Conrad Black. Porcupine's Quill.
- Walker, George A. (2014). Written in Wood: Three Wordless Graphic Narratives. Firefly Books.
- Walker, George A. (2014). The Wordless Leonard Cohen Songbook. Porcupine's Quill.
- Walker, George A. (2015). Sing to Me in the Cut: Ekphrasis on George Walker. Frog Hollow Press.
- Walker, George A. (2015). Trudeau: La Vie en Rose. Porcupine's Quill.
- Walker, George A. (2020). Mary Pickford: Queen of the Silent Film Era. Porcupine's Quill.
- Walker, George A. (2023). Ink & Paper: A Printmaker's Art. Firefly Books.
