= Carl Thomas Anderson =

American cartoonist (1865–1948)

- Born: February 14, 1865 Madison, Wisconsin, U.S.
- Died: November 4, 1948 (aged 83) Madison, Wisconsin, U.S.
- Area: Syndicated cartoonist
- Notable works: Henry

Carl Thomas Anderson (February 14, 1865 – November 4, 1948) was an American cartoonist best remembered for his comic strip Henry. Readers followed the pantomime adventures of the mute, bald-headed Henry in strips which he signed with his familiar signature displaying an enlarged "S": Carl AnderSon.

== Biography ==
=== Early life ===
Carl Thomas Anderson was born in Madison, Wisconsin, the son of Norwegian immigrants. Anderson initially worked in his father's planing mill in Des Moines, Iowa, where he developed carpentry skills, became a cabinetmaker, and invented a patented folding desk, which is still being manufactured today. Near the end of the 19th century, he traveled the United States, drifting to Omaha, San Francisco, and Seattle, where he worked until the city's 1889 fire.

=== From cabinets to cartoons ===
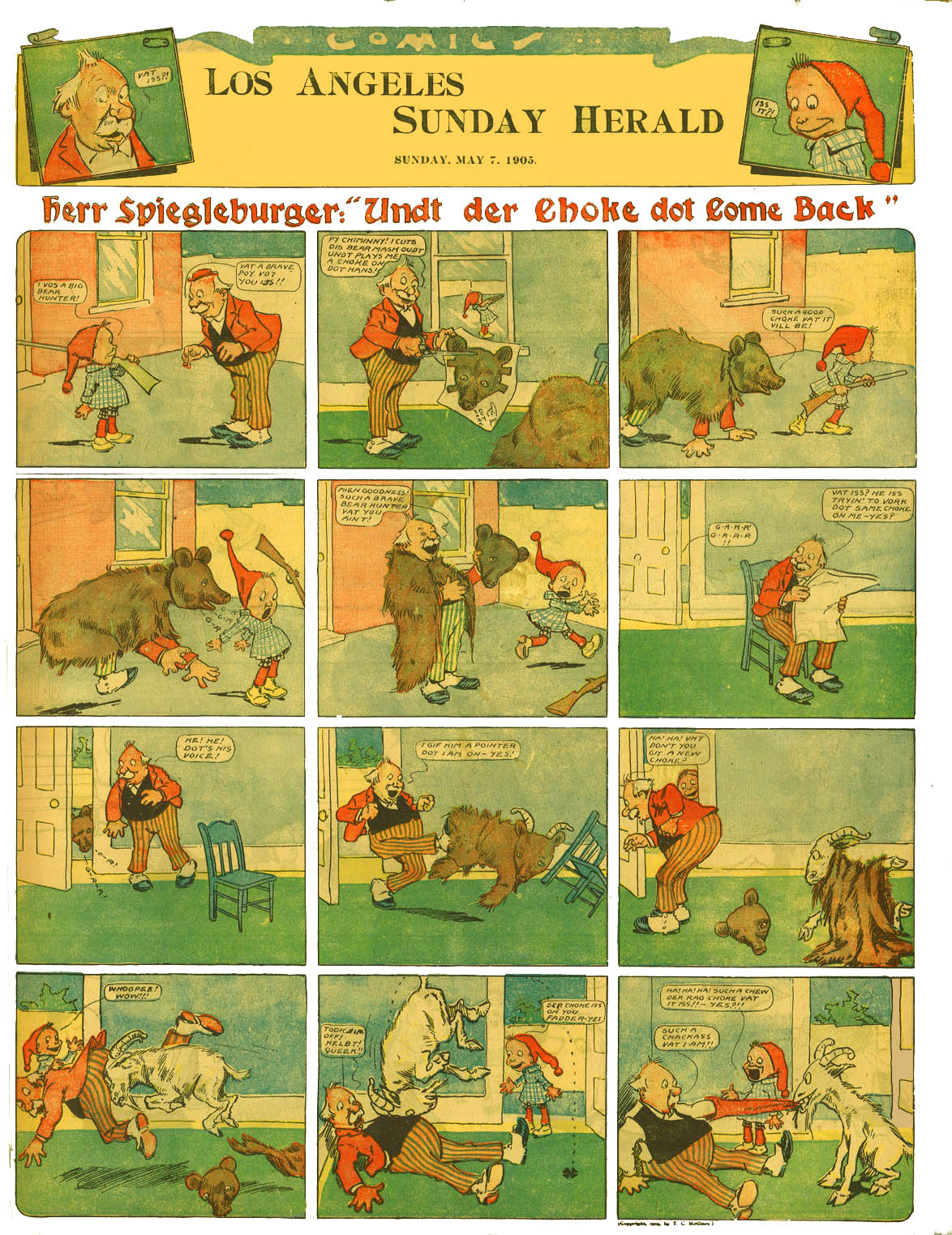
Carl Anderson's Herr Spiegleburger (May 7, 1905)

At the age of 25, he developed a strong interest in drawing and went to Philadelphia because the Pennsylvania Museum and School of Industrial Art was the only school he found specifically advertising a pen-and-ink course, where he graduated in 1893. In 1894, his first art job was with the Philadelphia Times, where he earned $12 a week drawing fashion illustrations.

He was hired by Arthur Brisbane for Joseph Pulitzer's New York World at the end of the 1890s. His strip The Filipino and the Chick ran on the Sunday page of the World, attracting the attention of William Randolph Hearst, who offered more money at his New York Journal. For Hearst, Anderson created Raffles and Bunny, and for the McClure Syndicate in 1903 he drew Herr Spiegelberger, the Amateur Cracksman.

Since these strips received only a mild reaction from readers, Anderson began freelancing for Judge, Life, and Puck. With the Great Depression looming and his markets diminishing, Anderson was 65 years old when he left New York in 1930, returning to Madison to care for his dying father. Anderson lived in Madison with his three sisters in the house his father built at 834 Prospect Place near Lake Mendota, and he resumed his earlier trade as a cabinetmaker while teaching night classes.

He also taught through his mail order cartoon course from "The Carl Anderson School, Madison, Wis." Small ads in 1930 issues of Popular Mechanics announced:

Cartoon & Comic Strip Course for only $2.98 complete. The Ace of Cartoon Courses. For fun and profit learn to draw cartoons and comic strips. Amazingly simple system developed by Carl Anderson, famous contributor to The Saturday Evening Post, Collier's, Life, Judge, New York Journal, New York World and other leading publications, give complete instructions in drawing, cartooning, comic strip and illustrations. These easy lessons make drawing as easy as writing.

=== Henry begins ===
Carl Anderson's Henry began in The Saturday Evening Post. This 1932 single panel is one of the earliest. Others in The Saturday Evening Post series were two panels or multiple panels.

In 1932, he sold his first Henry cartoon to The Saturday Evening Post for $50, and it became a regular weekly feature in that magazine. As interest in the character increased, Anderson began to receive fan mail, and his cartoons were reprinted in foreign publications. Hearst was traveling in Germany in 1934 when he saw Henry in the Berliner Illustrirte Zeitung. He sent a cablegram to his syndicate chief, Joseph Vincent Connolly, that simply read, "Get Henry." Connolly took the next train to Madison, where he signed Anderson for King Features Syndicate. Within months, Henry was being published in 50 American newspapers, including 15 Hearst papers. Anderson continued to work on the strip until arthritis made him retire in January 1942. Anderson died at the Edgewater Hotel in Madison at age 83 in 1948. The strip continued with other artists, finally being discontinued on October 28, 2018, a week short of the seventieth anniversary of its creator's death.

== Books ==
In 1934, the first Henry book was published featuring 60 cartoons from The Saturday Evening Post. Anderson followed with How to Draw Cartoons Successfully, published by Greenberg in 1935.

== Sources ==
- Rath, Jay. "Silents, Please! The Unspeakable Greatness of Carl Anderson's 'Henry.'" Nemo, the Classic Comics Library #26, (Sept. 1987): 42‑52.
- Strickler, Dave. Syndicated Comic Strips and Artists, 1924-1995: The Complete Index. Cambria, California: Comics Access, 1995. ISBN 0-9700077-0-1.
