= The Little King =

1930–1975 American comic strip

- An eight-panel installment of Otto Soglow's long-lived comic strip The Little King.
- Author: Otto Soglow
- Current status/schedule: Concluded
- Launch date: September 9, 1930
- End date: July 20, 1975
- Syndicate: King Features Syndicate
- Genre(s): Gag-a-day, pantomime comics
- Preceded by: The Ambassador

The Little King is an American gag-a-day comic strip created by Otto Soglow, which ran from 1930 to 1975. Its stories are told in a style using images and very few words, as in pantomime.

== Publication history ==
Soglow's character first appeared on June 7, 1930, in The New Yorker and soon showed signs of becoming a successful strip. The Little King began publications in comic book issues from 1933, was licensed for a 1933–34 series of animated cartoons by Van Beuren Studios and featured in advertising campaigns for Standard Oil and Royal Pudding (1955).

It became evident early on that William Randolph Hearst was determined to add The Little King to his King Features Syndicate newspaper strips, but he was hindered by Soglow's contractual obligations with The New Yorker. While seeing out the final period of the contract, Soglow produced a placeholder strip for King Features, The Ambassador, quite similar to The Little King in characters, style and story situations. One week after its final publication in The New Yorker, The Little King resumed as a King Features Sunday strip, on September 9, 1934.

Otto Soglow's The Little King (1939)

The strip continued a successful run with several more animated cartoon appearances and advertising campaigns, and Soglow was awarded the 1966 National Cartoonists Society Reuben Award for the strip. The Little King ran until Soglow's death in 1975. The final strip ran on July 20, 1975.

== Format ==
The strip is notable for having virtually no dialogue; the title character never speaks. The Ambassador was nearly identical in format, and the main characters of the two strips were similar. When The Ambassador gave way for The Little King in 1934, the reader could not be certain if it was the Little King who had arrived into Hearst syndication or the Ambassador who had removed some disguise.

The Little King (mustachioed, bearded, and clad in velvet and ermine) was small of stature, but as wide as he was tall. He was a childlike, cheerful fellow who lived to have fun. The final panel of the comic strip often showed His Majesty pursuing a hobby, playing a children's game, flirting with a pretty woman, or otherwise enjoying himself in an unkingly fashion while neglecting his "official" duties.

== Animated theatrical shorts ==
All cartoon shorts were produced by Van Beuren Studios except where otherwise noted. All of the theatrical shorts have been released on DVD and Blu-ray by Thunderbean Animation. As in the comic strips, the Little King never speaks in the 1933 and 1934 shorts except for a brief line in "Marching Along" (1933).

1933

#	Title	Release Date	Director(s)	Distributor	Film	Notes
1	A Dizzy Day	May 5, 1933	Harry Bailey	RKO Radio Pictures		Part of the Aesop’s Fables series. Branded as a “Sentinel Louey” cartoon.
2	A.M to P.M	July 28, 1933	Harry Bailey	RKO Radio Pictures		Part of the Aesop’s Fables series. Branded as a “Sentinel Louey” cartoon.
3	The Fatal Note	September 29, 1933	Vernon Stallings	RKO Radio Pictures		The first cartoon to feature The Little King.
4	Marching Along	October 2, 1933	Vernon Stallings & James Tyer	RKO Radio Pictures		
5	On the Pan	November 24, 1933	Vernon Stallings & James Tyer	RKO Radio Pictures		Was later retitled “In Darkest Africa” by Official Films for Home Movie release.
6	Pals	December 22, 1933	Oscar E. Soglow & James Tyer	RKO Radio Pictures		Later retitled “Christmas Night” and “Christmas Up North”. Released by Official Films for Home Movie release.

1934

#	Title	Release Date	Director	Distributor	Film	Notes
7	Jest of Honor	January 19, 1934	Vernon Stallings	RKO Radio Pictures		
8	Jolly Good Felons	February 16, 1934	Vernon Stallings	RKO Radio Pictures		
9	Sultan Pepper	March 16, 1934	Vernon Stallings	RKO Radio Pictures		
10	A Royal Good Time	April 13, 1934	Vernon Stallings	RKO Radio Pictures		
11	Art For Art’s Sake	May 11, 1934	Vernon Stallings	RKO Radio Pictures	Original B&W Version.	Released by Official Films for Home Movie release & later Redrawn Colorized in the 1970’s.
12	Cactus King	June 8, 1934	Vernon Stallings	RKO Radio Pictures		The last Little King cartoon from The Van Beuren Studio.

1936

Title	Release Date	Director	Distributor	Film	Notes
Betty Boop and the Little King	January 31, 1936	Dave Fleischer & Myron Waldman	Paramount Pictures	TV Release.	The only Betty Boop, Fleischer, & Paramount cartoon to feature The Little King. The only cartoon to feature Betty Boop and The Little King together.

== Collections ==
- The Little King (1933), Farrar & Rinehart
- Cartoon Monarch: Otto Soglow and the Little King (2012), IDW Publishing's imprint The Library of American Comics
