= Otto Soglow =

American cartoonist

- Born: December 23, 1900; Yorkville, Manhattan
- Died: April 3, 1975 (aged 74); New York City
- Occupation: Cartoonist
- Known for: The Little King

Otto Soglow (December 23, 1900 – April 3, 1975) was an American cartoonist best known for his comic strip The Little King.

Born in Yorkville, Manhattan, as a child of German-Jewish parents, Soglow grew up in New York City, where he held various jobs as a teenager and made an unsuccessful effort to become an actor. His first job was painting designs on baby rattles. While studying with John Sloan at the Art Students League of New York, his first cartoon was printed in 1919. Throughout the 1920s, his drawings were seen in numerous magazines.

Soglow's artwork was published in New Masses, New York World, Collier's, The New Yorker, Judge and Life. He illustrated more than 35 books, and did five books of his own, including Wasn't the Depression Terrible? (1934).

== The Little King ==
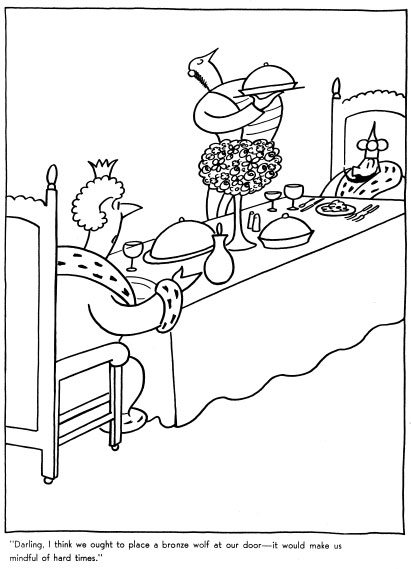
Soglow cartoon from the book Wasn't the Depression Terrible? (1934)

His character The Little King first appeared in The New Yorker in 1930. William Randolph Hearst hired Soglow away for his King Features Syndicate. Contractual obligations to The New Yorker prevented The Little King from appearing immediately. Soglow then produced a knock-off strip called The Ambassador from 1933 to 1934. After The Little King debuted on September 9, 1934, it ran until Soglow's death in 1975. It is available through King Features' email service, DailyINK.

== National Cartoonists Society ==
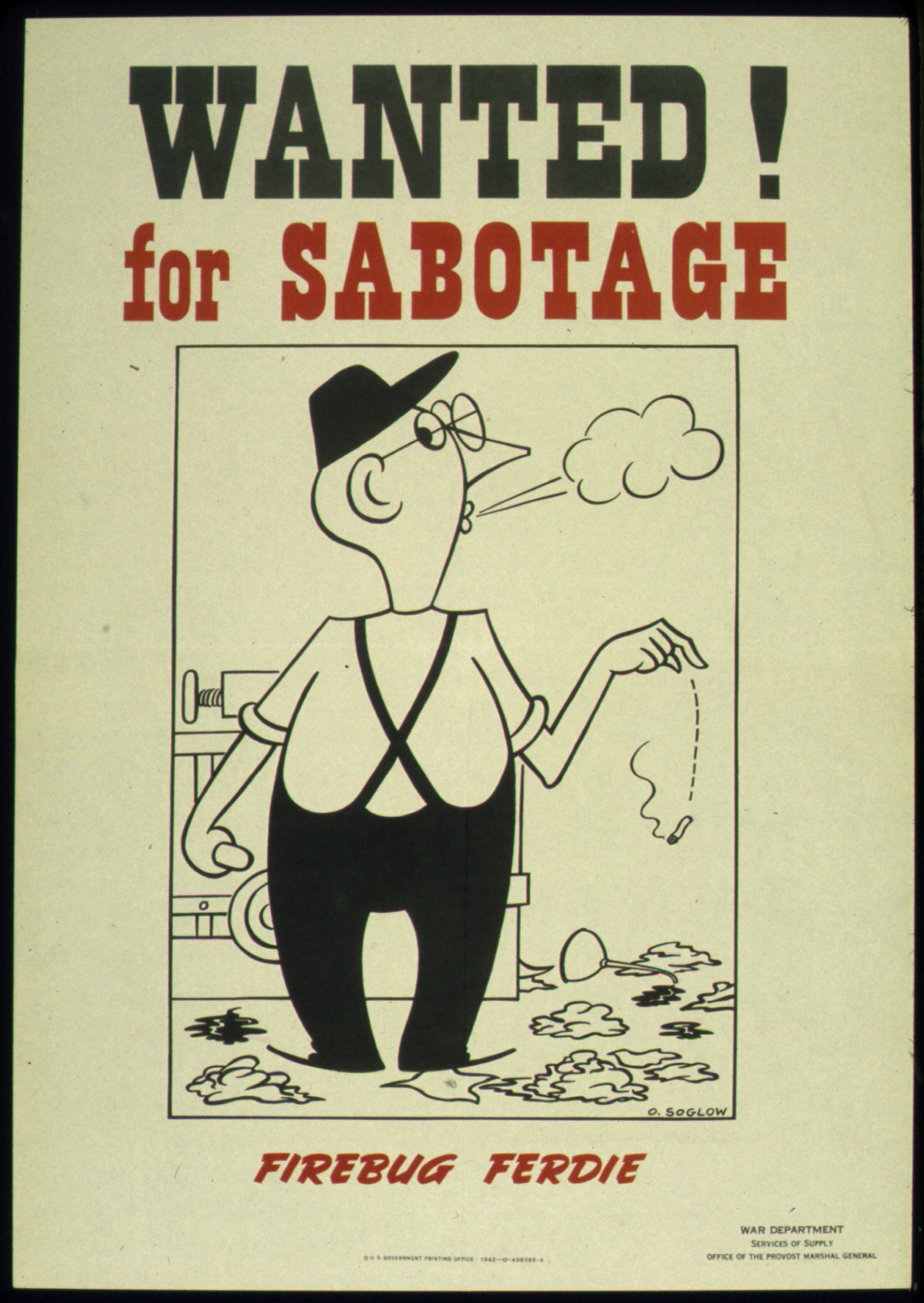
Cartoon by Otto Soglow

In 1941, Soglow lived at 330 West 72nd Street in Manhattan. He was a co-founder of the National Cartoonists Society and served as president for the 1953–54 term.

He died in New York City in 1975. Otto and Annie Soglow had one daughter, Tona.

== Awards ==
He received the National Cartoonists Society's Reuben Award in 1966, followed by its Elzie Segar Award in 1972.
