= George Boardman the Younger =

American clergyman (1828–1903)

George Dana Boardman
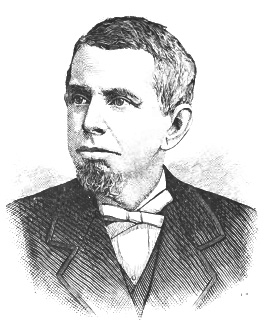
- Born: 1828; Burma
- Died: April 28, 1903 (aged 74–75); Atlantic City, New Jersey, U.S.
- Education: Worcester Academy
- Alma mater: Brown University, Newton Theological Institution

George Dana Boardman the Younger (1828 – April 28, 1903) was an American clergyman.

== Early life and education ==
Boardman was born in Burma, the son of the Baptist missionaries George Dana Boardman and Sarah Hall Boardman. He returned to the United States as a boy and attended Worcester Academy in Worcester, Massachusetts, where he graduated in 1846, and then Brown University in Providence, Rhode Island, where he graduated in 1852. He continued his education at the Newton Theological Institution and graduated in 1855.

== Career ==
In 1855, Boardman became pastor of the Baptist church in Barnwell, South Carolina, but his views on the slavery question impelled him to exchange his charge in 1856 for a church further north. He was pastor of the Second Baptist Church in Rochester, New York, until 1864, and pastor of the First Baptist Church, Philadelphia, from 1864 to 1894. Boardman was elected to the American Philosophical Society in 1880. In 1893, Boardman was the closing presenter to speak at the World's Parliament of Religions in Chicago; delivering the lecture, Christ the Unifier of Mankind.

In June 1899, he established the permanent lectureship known as the Boardman Foundation in Christian Ethics at the University of Pennsylvania in Philadelphia. He was president of the Christian Arbitration and Peace Society and of the American Baptist Missionary Union. His most important production is a monograph, Titles of Wednesday Evening Lectures. It embraces 981 of his lectures, delivered between 1865 and 1880, and comprises a complete exegesis of the Bible.

=== Brotherhood of the Kingdom ===
Boardman was a founding member of the Brotherhood of the Kingdom in 1892, a group of the leading thinkers and writers of the Social Gospel movement at the end of the 19th and beginning of the 20th centuries. Other pastors and authors who founded the group with Boardman were leading Social Gospelers Walter Rauschenbusch, Samuel Zane Batten and Leighton Williams.

Boardman is probably best remembered for the quotation attributed to him as:

The law of the harvest is to reap more than you sow. Sow an act, and you reap a habit; sow a habit, and you reap a character; sow a character, and you reap a destiny.

He died in Atlantic City, New Jersey and is buried at The Woodlands Cemetery in Philadelphia.

== Published works ==
- Titles of Wednesday Evening Lectures
- Studies in the Model Prayer D. Appleton & Company
- Studies in the Creative Week (New York, 1878) D. Appleton & Company
- The Epiphanies of the Risen Lord (New York, 1879) D. Appleton & Company
- Disarmament of Nations (1880)
- The Ten Commandments (1889)
- The Kingdom (1899)
- The Church (1901)
- The Golden Rule (1901)
- Our Risen King's Forty Days (1902)
- The Problem of Jesus (new edition, 1913)
