= Christianity and economics =

Christianity and economics may refer to:

- Catholic social teaching, Catholic doctrine on economics and social organization
- Christian communism, the belief that Jesus taught his followers to practice communism
- Christian left, parts of Christianity associated with left-wing politics and related economic policies
- Christian socialism, the belief that Jesus taught his followers to practice socialism
- Christian right § Economics, economic views of parts of Christianity associated with right-wing politics
- Distributism, an economic theory asserting that productive assets should be widely owned rather than concentrated
- Economic ethics, an academic field which combines economics and ethics, including Christian ethics
- Protestant work ethic, a Christian work ethic concept widely studied in sociology, economics, and history
- Role of Christianity in civilization § Economic development, the impact of Christianity on economic development
- Social Creed (Methodist), Methodist doctrine on economics and social organization
- Social Gospel, a social movement to apply Christian ethics to social problems, including economic inequality
