= Washington Gladden Social Justice Park =

Park in Columbus, Ohio, U.S.

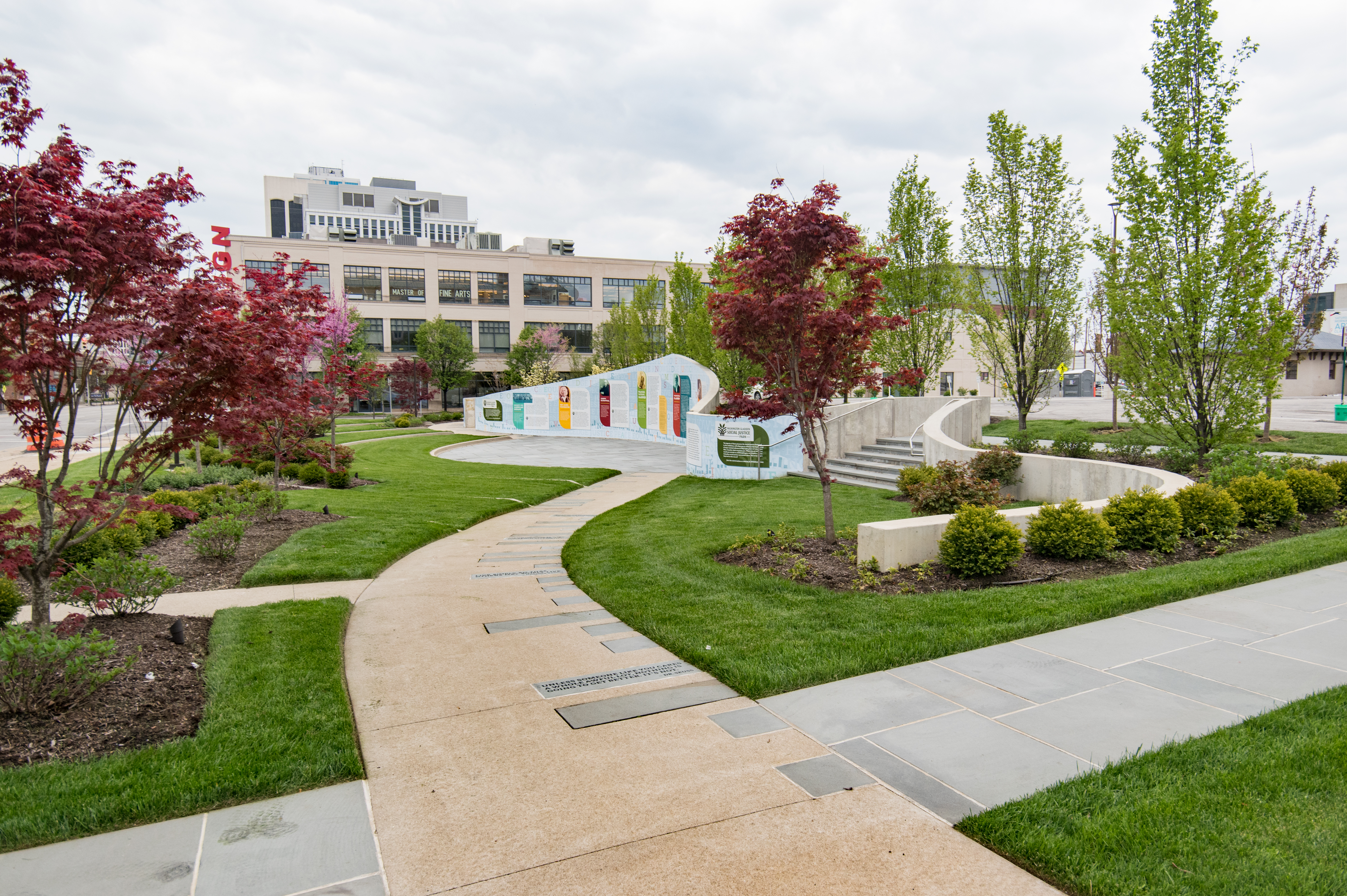
- Interactive map of Washington Gladden Social Justice Park
- Location: 404 E. Broad St., Columbus, Ohio
- Coordinates: 39.9637°N 82.9895°W
- Area: 18,000 sq ft (1,700 m^{2})
- Opened: October 28, 2018
- Designer: Architectural Gardens and Schieber and Associates
- Owner: First Congregational Church
- Administrator: Governing Board of the Washington Gladden Social Justice Park; Tom Worley, director Mark Dahnke, superintendent
- Public transit: 7, 9, 10, 11; CoGo

The Washington Gladden Social Justice Park is a public park in the Discovery District of Downtown Columbus, Ohio. The park was dedicated in 2018. It is considered the first social justice park in the United States.

== Attributes ==
The park has 18,000 sq ft (1,700 m^{2}). The site of the park, on E. Broad Street and Cleveland Avenue, is adjacent to the city's First Congregational Church.

The park is named for Washington Gladden, an early leader of the Social Gospel and Progressive movements, and minister of the First Congregational Church for 36 years. The park honors Gladden and other social justice leaders of the city.

It is considered the first social justice park in the country. Other parks with similar themes include the Women's Rights National Historical Park in Seneca Falls, New York, the Civil Rights National Monument and Park in Birmingham, Alabama, and the Voting Rights National Monument and Park in Selma, Alabama.

The park land is owned by the First Congregational Church, though it is funded by a Columbus Foundation fund overseen by community and church member trustees. The park also has a governing board, appointed by the church council, also made up of a mix of churchgoers and community members. The park's volunteer director is Tom Worley, and its superintendent is Mark Dahnke, who is also the church's building and grounds superintendent.

=== Artwork ===
==== Mural wall ====
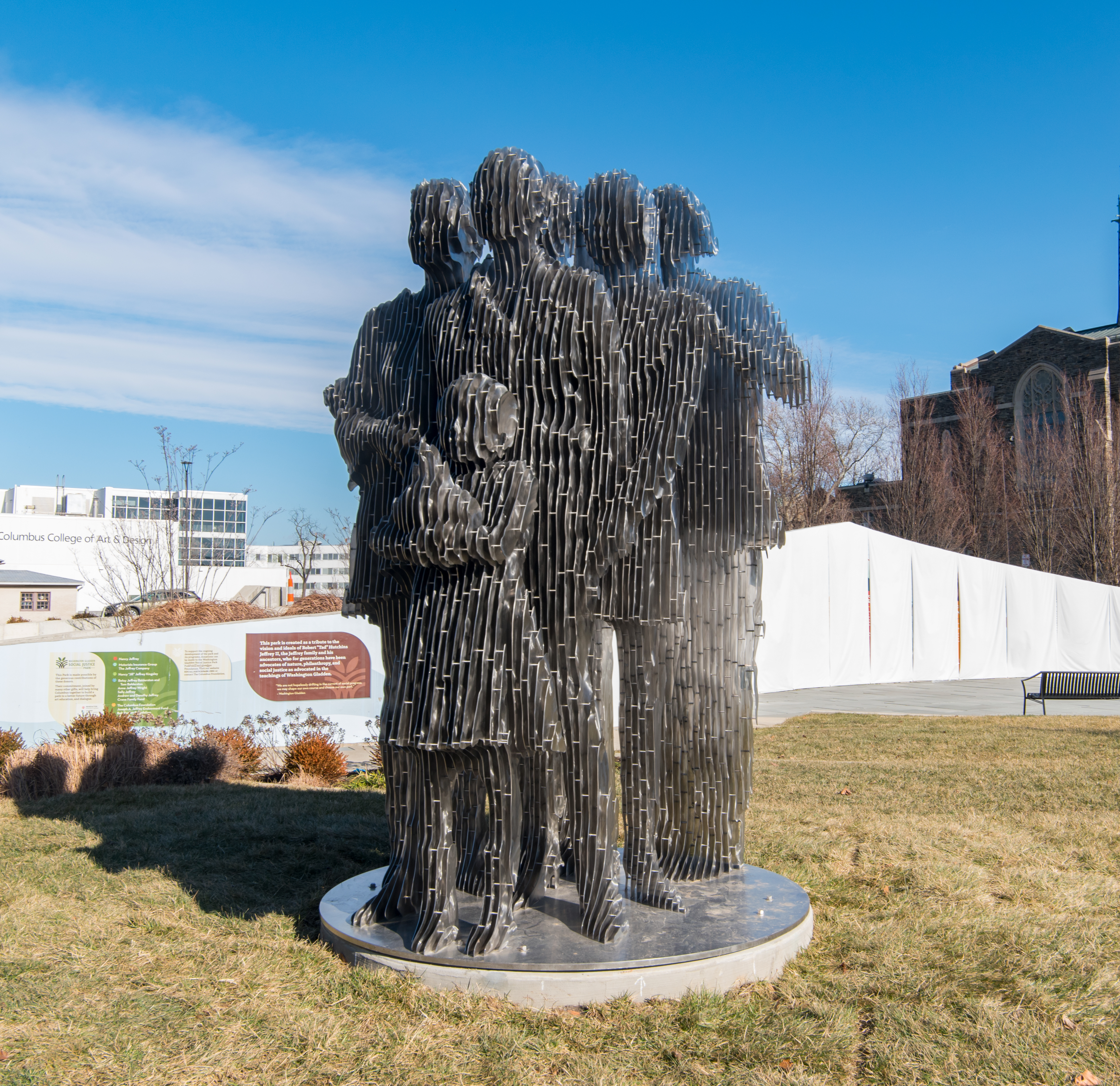
Our Single Garment of Destiny, 2021

The park's central structure is a 95-ft.-long concrete mural wall. The current mural installation, Social Justice Legends, was completed in May 2022 and is on display through 2023. It contains the names of about 160 social justice leaders along with 50 terms or slogans relating to social justice issues.

The first installation, the Columbus Social Justice Pioneers Exhibit, was displayed from the park's opening in 2018 until May 2022. It depicted seven local social justice leaders from the late 18th and early 19th centuries. It also highlighted the Columbus-founded Society of American Indians, American Federation of Labor, and United Mine Workers of America.

The people depicted on the central mural included:

- Washington Gladden, a social justice and civil rights activist and former minister at First Congregational Church
- Frances Harper, an abolitionist, suffragist, and poet
- Florence E. Allen, the first female Ohio Supreme Court justice and one of the first to serve as a federal judge
- Joseph Schonthal, a philanthropist devoted to helping immigrants and children
- Celia Jeffrey, co-founder of the present-day Gladden Community House
- James Preston Poindexter, a politician and civil rights activist, and the first African-American on the Columbus City Council
- John Ambrose Watterson, a founder of Mount Carmel and St. Anthony hospitals and the Pontifical College Josephinum

==== Sculpture ====
The park also features a sculpture titled Our Single Garment of Destiny, designed by Adriana and Julian Voss-Andreae. The work was inspired by King's "Letter from Birmingham Jail"; the sculpture's name is borrowed from the work as well. The three-ton sculpture depicts several people standing closely together, along with a rescued animal. It was designed with thin steel sheets to appear solid from the sides, but barely visible from the front, representing people with great challenges who appear invisible to society, as well as "individual people becoming a coherent whole". The work was designed with Portland, Oregon activists as models, and was dedicated in a virtual ceremony (due to COVID-19) on Martin Luther King Jr. Day in 2021.

== History ==
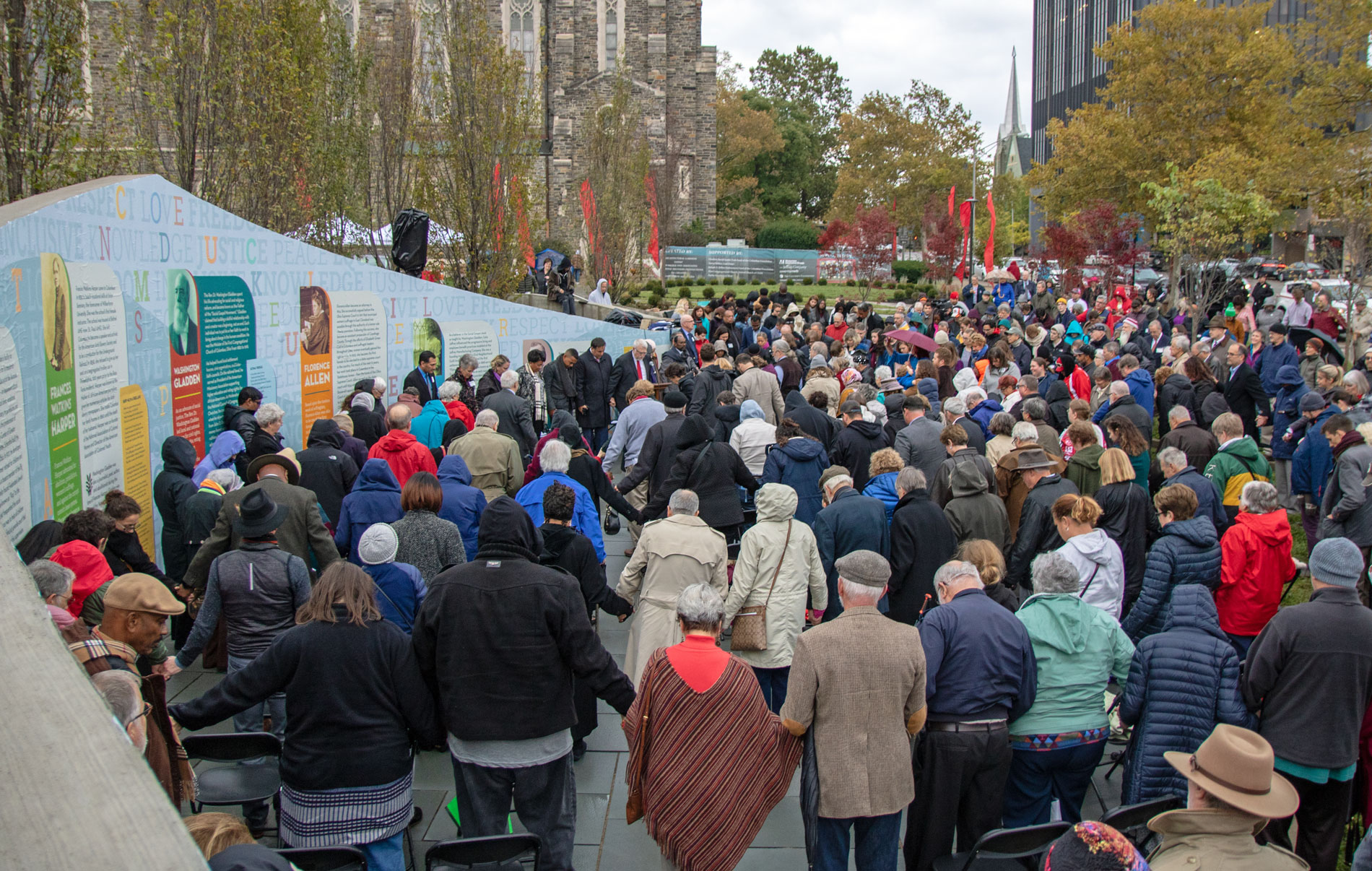
Park dedication, 2018

The site of the park has been a used car dealership, and in 2010, as a parking lot for the nearby First Congregational Church.

In 2018, the church led the creation of the Washington Gladden Social Justice Park. The park land was already owned by the church, which entered into a public-private partnership to create the space. The park was built from March to October 2018 at a cost of $3.7 million, begun by a 2016 donation by Nancy Jeffrey. Her ancestors, founders of the Jeffrey Manufacturing Company, worked with Gladden on social issues. The park was dedicated on October 28, 2018.

== See also ==
- List of parks in Columbus, Ohio
