= Harry F. Ward =

American Christian socialist leader (1873–1966)

The Reverend Harry F. Ward
- Ward in 1941
- Born: Harry Frederick Ward, Jr. October 15, 1873; Chiswick, Middlesex, England
- Died: December 9, 1966 (aged 93); Fort Lee, New Jersey, US
- Known for: Serving as founding chairman of the American Civil Liberties Union
- Spouse: Daisy Kendall (m. 1899)
- Children: Gordon Ward; Lynd Ward; Muriel Ward
- Parents: Harry Freeman Ward Sr.; Fanny Jeffrey

Ecclesiastical career
- Religion: Christianity (Methodist)
- Church: Methodist Episcopal Church
- Ordained: 1902

Academic background
- Education: University of Southern California; Northwestern University (BA); Harvard University (MA)
- Influences: George Albert Coe; John H. Gray; Vladimir Lenin; Karl Marx

Academic work
- Discipline: Philosophy
- Sub-discipline: Ethics
- School or tradition: Christian socialism; Marxism
- Institutions: Union Theological Seminary
- Main interests: Social ethics
- Influenced: J. King Gordon

Harry Frederick Ward Jr. (Note: Numerous sources attest Ward's use of this name throughout his life. Minutes of his questioning before the House Committee on Un-American Activities record him saying his name as "Harry Freeman Ward".) (15 October 1873 – 9 December 1966) was an English-born American Methodist minister and political activist who identified himself with the movement for Christian socialism, best remembered as first national chairman of the American Civil Liberties Union (ACLU) from its creation in 1920 until his resignation in protest of the organization's decision to bar communists in 1940.

== Background ==
Harry Frederick Ward Jr., was born on October 15, 1873, in Chiswick (on the outskirts of London), Middlesex, England. His parents were Harry F. Ward Sr., a successful businessman and Methodist lay minister, and Fanny Jeffrey. Ward's upbringing was steeped both in commercial and religious values and he began working in his father's business as a wagon-driver during his teenage years.

In 1878 Ward was sent away to a boarding school, a rather harsh and inferior environment to the more illustrious public schools occupied by the sires of the upper class. In the estimation of Ward's biographer, Eugene P. Link, this experience quite possibly contributed to Ward's later distaste for differentiation of society into social classes. During this interval Ward developed rheumatic heart problems which forced his removal from school to live with aunts in the rural environs of Lyndhurst, Hampshire. Ward later remembered the experience favorably, even naming his son, the illustrator Lynd Ward, after the English south coastal town.

In 1891, Ward emigrated to the United States at the age of 17 in pursuit of a higher education. In May 1891 Ward arrived in Salt Lake City, Utah, at the home of an uncle living there to take up work for him as a horse driver. He also worked for a time as a farmhand for another uncle living in the neighboring Western state of Idaho. In addition to these and other jobs, Ward dedicated part of his time to Methodist evangelism as a lay minister preaching to passersby on street corners.

In 1893 Ward was finally able to accomplish his goal of entering a university, enrolling at the University of Southern California (USC), located in the still modest-sized town of Los Angeles. (Note: Los Angeles recorded a population of slightly more than 50,000 people in the census of 1893.) Ward became an admirer of a young political science instructor named George Albert Coe and, when Coe left USC for Northwestern University in Evanston, Illinois, at the end of Ward's freshman year, Ward followed his mentor there. Ward majored in philosophy and minored in political science at Northwestern, with his background in populist Christian evangelism and social gospel–driven concern for the poor gradually taking on a more politicized flavor, influenced at least to some extent by the anti-capitalist critique of Karl Marx.

During his Northwestern University years Ward was active in intercollegiate debate, in which he was regarded as a skillful participant. Ward received a bachelor's degree from Northwestern in 1897 and, upon the recommendation of the Northwestern President Henry Wade Rogers, was granted a one-year scholarship to Harvard University, from which he graduated with a master's degree in philosophy in 1898. Also in 1898, he became an ordained Methodist minister.

== Social worker and preacher ==
Following graduation, Ward took a position as head resident of Northwestern University Settlement, a settlement house located in Chicago, Illinois, which sought to educate and improve the lives of impoverished immigrant workers of the city's meatpacking district. This settlement house was first launched in 1891, inspired by Hull House, established by Jane Addams and Ellen Gates Starr two years previously. Ward would remain in this position as a resident amongst the urban poor until being forced out by the settlement's governing council due to personal conflicts in the summer of 1900.

The English-born Ward gained American citizenship on October 10, 1898, at Cook County Courthouse in Chicago, shortly after beginning his life at Northwestern University Settlement.

Also in 1898, Ward received his first posting to a Methodist pastorate as co-pastor of the Wabash Avenue Methodist Episcopal Church. He also became involved in the wider Chicago Protestant movement, gaining election as Secretary of the Open and Institutional Church League. Ward first became an outspoken advocate of participation in "Christian politics" in this interval, declaring the necessity to put pressure for social reform upon the Chicago political structure without compromise, so as to help establish the "divine ideal, working out the dreams of the prophets, bringing in the Kingdom of God, establishing a true theocracy, a democracy led by God in the shape of the teachings of His Son."

In October 1900, Ward was moved to the 47th Street Methodist Episcopal Church, another pastorate in the Chicago stockyards district with a congregation composed largely of working-class immigrants from Eastern Europe. Ward was increasingly radicalized by contact with the impoverished workers who attended his church. Ward himself joined the fledgling Amalgamated Meat Cutters and Butcher Workmen of North America in a show of solidarity with his parishioners. He also joined the Civic Club of Chicago, where he became the chairman of its Committee on Labor Conditions. Ward evangelized the social gospel, sermonizing on matters of economics and poverty and the potential role of the church in the rectification of the structural failings of society.

Following the birth of his second son in 1905, Ward took a one-year sabbatical leave during which time he seems to have read the works of Karl Marx for the first time. In the estimation of Ward biographer David Nelson Duke, the introduction to Marxism was not transformative for Ward, but rather "offered labels for and an interpretation of what he knew firsthand" from his life amongst Chicago's working poor.

Ward returned to the pulpit in the fall of 1906 reenergized. Over the course of the next year he began to formulate plans with a trio of like-minded Methodist ministers from Ohio and others to establish a new organization within the Methodist community dedicated to advance religious principles through practical politics. This group, the Methodist Federation for Social Service (MFSS), was formally brought into being at a National Conference held in Washington, DC, on December 3, 1907. Ward addressed this initial gathering and served as head of the Committee on Programs, establishing an agenda for the organization based upon the publication of pamphlet literature and the dispatch of speakers. The MFSS was to be based upon a set of local chapters, each of which was to promote "social study" within their separate communities and to further coordinate local activities as part of a broad national program. Ward served as its secretary general from 1911 (or 1912) to 1944.

In 1908, Ward was one of several primary authors of the Social Creed (Methodist) of the Federal Council of Churches, which was also used by the Methodist Church. By the fall of 1908, Ward was assigned to a new parish, this time in the Chicago suburbs at the Euclid Avenue Methodist Episcopal Church in Oak Park. In December 1910 Ward was named secretary of the MFSS, a newly paid position. Ward oversaw the launch of the MFSS's official organ, Social Service Bulletin, in 1911 as well as the publication of a series of pamphlets, activity which was well-received within the hierarchy of the Methodist Church.

== Academic career ==
In 1913, Ward became the first professor of "Social Service" at the Boston University School of Theology until 1919. In 1916, he became a lecturer at Union Theological Seminary and in 1919 professor of Christian ethics there.

From 1918 to 1941, Ward served as professor of ethics at the Union Theological Seminary. In all, he taught there for a quarter of a century. He was professor emeritus there from 1941 to his death in 1966.

== Political activism ==
Ward helped found the American Civil Liberties Union (ACLU) and served as its national chairman from 1920 to 1940. He resigned when the ACLU decided to bar Communists from holding ACLU offices.

Ward was active in a variety of left-wing causes besides the American Civil Liberties Union (ACLU). He was one of the founders of the Methodist Federation for Social Action and served as its general secretary from 1911 to 1944. He supported eugenics, claiming that they and Christianity were compatible as both pursued the "challenge of removing the causes that produce the weak." In 1933, he formed "New America, an organization committed to economic reform" with an inclination toward Socialism. From 1934 to 1940, he was the chairman of the American League Against War and Fascism. He frequently spoke at events held by the National Council of American-Soviet Friendship and received an honor from its women's division in 1941.

In 1927, during a Columbia University symposium, Ward stated that Capitalism is a state of mind and a religion, of which most of the world is skeptical and that only in the United States does it flourish. In 1933, he signed an open letter that asked the US Immigration service to admit religious and political refugees from Nazi Germany. In 1937, Ward spoke out against anti-semitism in Poland. In 1938, he spoke out against "mass mechanized warfare" and separately criticized Nazism.

=== Dies Committee ===
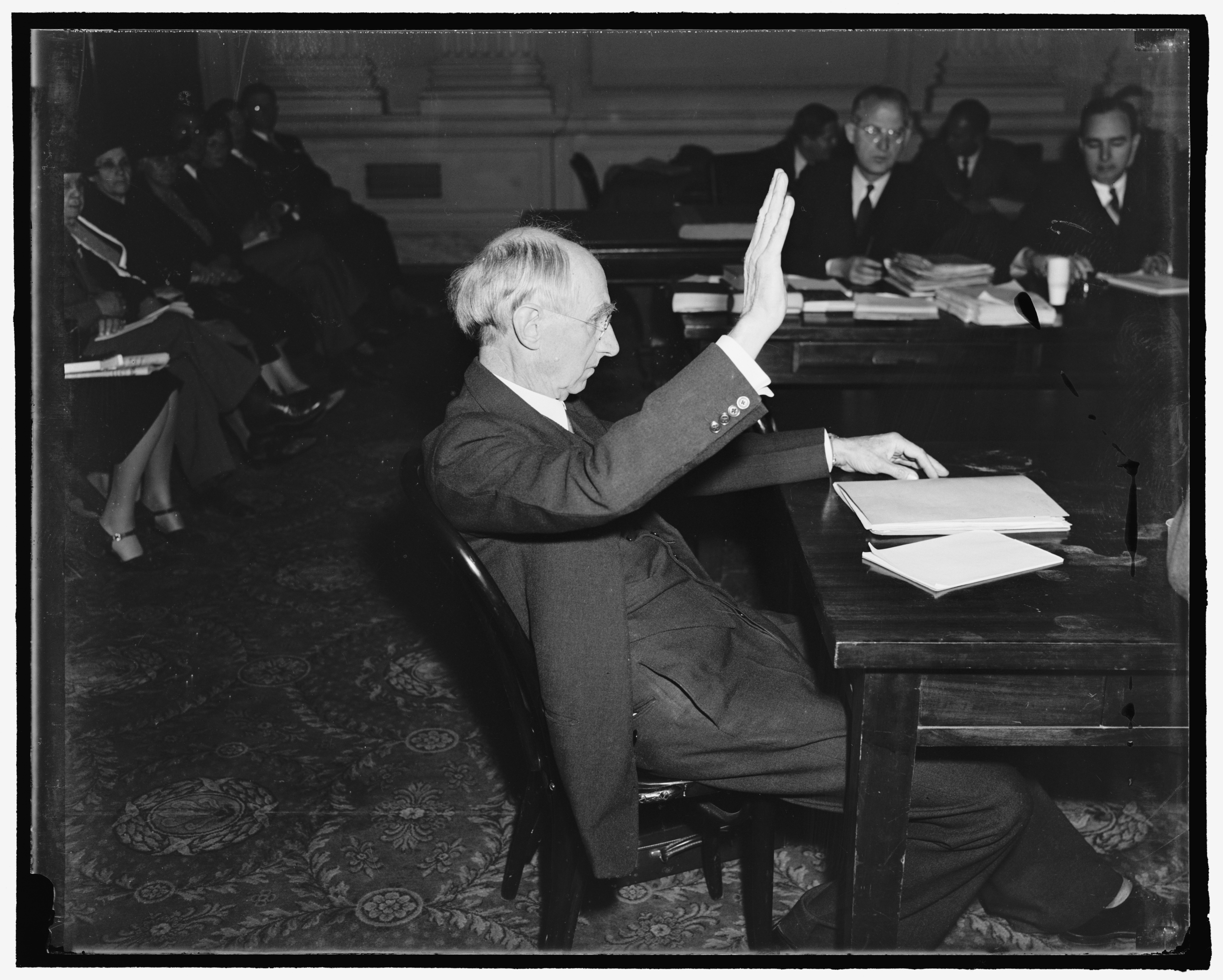
Ward testifies before the Dies Committee, October 23, 1939

On October 23, 1939, Ward testified before the House Un-American Activities Committee (then known as the Dies Committee), which had concluded that the American League Against War and Fascism was a communist front. During all-day testimony, Ward, cited primarily as "chairman of the American League for Peace and Democracy," which he served from 1934 to 1940. He admitted that the Communist Party had contributed between $2,000 and $3,000 annually but denied any Soviet influence on the league.

In March 1940, the ACLU, under pressure to demonstrate its anti-communism, barred communists from holding office in the organization.

Formally, the ACLU barred "anyone who is a member of any political organization which supports totalitarian dictatorships in any country." Ward resigned in protest and Elizabeth Gurley Flynn, the ACLU's lone communist board member, was forced out soon after.

=== HUAC allegations ===
In 1953, the House Un-American Activities Committee (HUAC) named him as one of three Methodist ministers who was a Communist conspirator. Ward rejected HUAC's finding as "completely false" and stated he had never joined a political party.

Toward the end of his life, Ward consulted to the Religious Freedom Committee, which organized a national campaign to abolish HUAC, which changed its name in 1969 and disbanded in 1975.

=== Vietnam protest ===
In 1963, Ward was one of many signatories of an open letter that asked US President John F. Kennedy to stop the war in Vietnam.

== Personal life and death ==
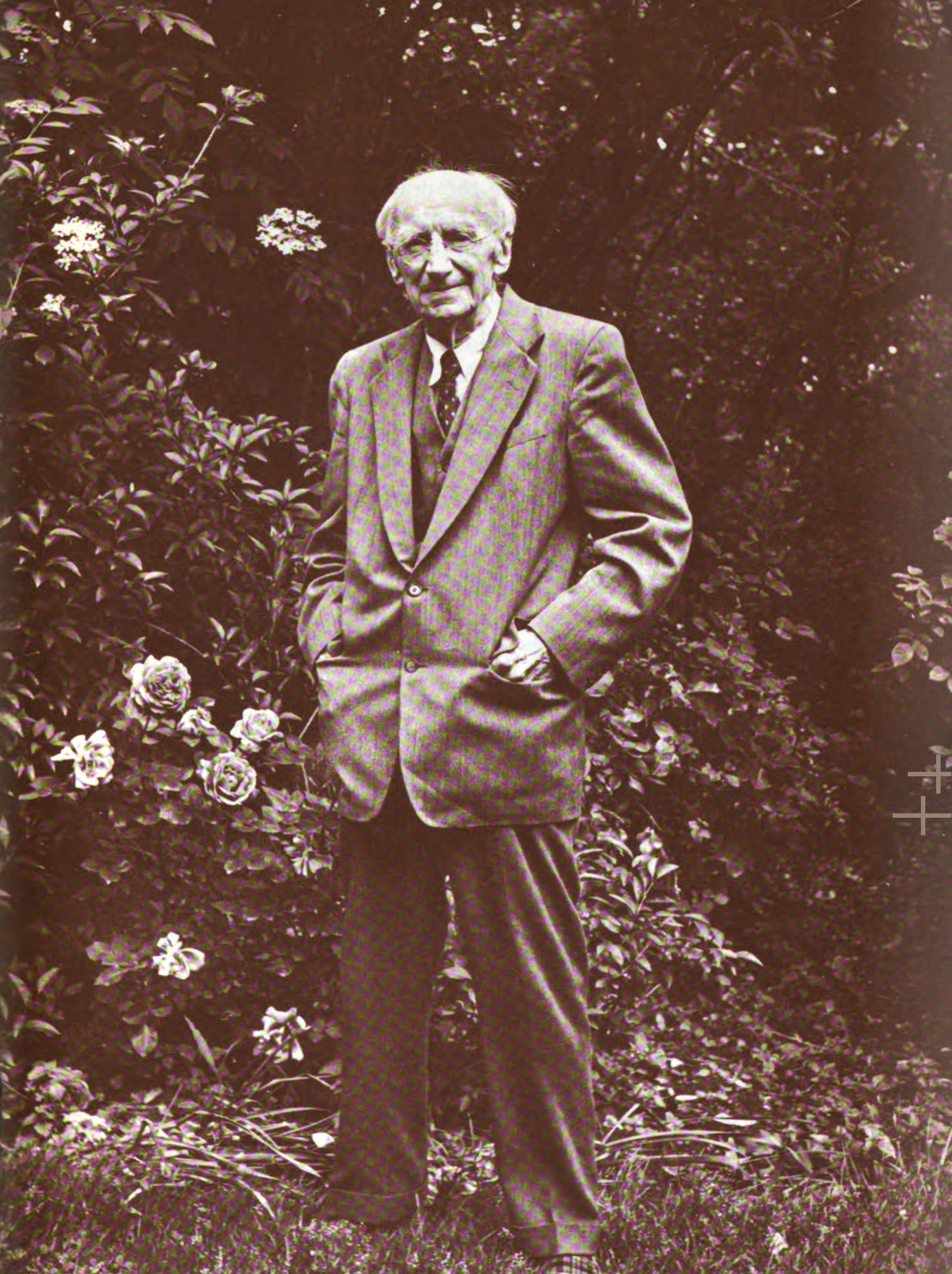
Ward in his rose garden in the Palisades, June 1963

Ward married Daisy Kendall in 1899. The couple had two children: Gordon Hugh Ward (born June 27, 1903), who later became an agricultural economics professor, and the artist Lynd Kendall Ward (born June 1905). A daughter, Muriel, was born in February 1907.

During his final two years Ward was weak, bedridden, and in need of constant care from home aides. Ward died on December 9, 1966, at the age of 93, in his home in Fort Lee, New Jersey, with a small private funeral held on December 12. A public memorial service was held at Union Theological Seminary on January 4, 1967, with fewer than the chapel's capacity of 500 persons in attendance.

== Awards ==
- 1931: Honorary Law Degree (LLD), University of Wisconsin

== Works ==
=== Books and pamphlets ===
- Social Ministry: An Introduction to the Study and Practice of Social Service. Editor. New York: Eaton and Mains. 1910.
- The Social Creed of the Churches. New York: Eaton and Mains. 1914.
- Social Service for Young People: What Is It?. Boston: Social Service Department of the Congregational Churches. 1914.
- A Year Book of the Church and Social Service in the United States. 1. Editor. New York: Fleming H. Revell. 1914.
- Social Evangelism. New York: Missionary Education Movement of the United States and Canada. 1915.
- Poverty and Wealth: From the Viewpoint of the Kingdom of God. Edited by Meyer, Henry H. New York: Methodist Book Center. 1915.
- A Year Book of the Church and Social Service in the United States. 2. Editor. New York: Fleming H. Revell. 1916.
- The Living Wage: A Religious Necessity. Philadelphia: American Baptist Publishing Center. 1916.
- The Bible and Social Living. With Weston, Sidney A. New York: Methodist Book Concern. 1917.
- The Labor Movement: From the Standpoint of Religious Values. New York: Sturgis and Walton. 1917.
- Social Duties in War Times. New York: Association Press. 1917.
- What Every Church Should Know about Its Community. With Atkinson, Henry A. New York: Federal Council of Churches of Christ in America. 1917.
- Foreign Missions and Social Service. New York: Board of Foreign Missions of the Methodist Episcopal Church. 1917.
- Christianizing Community Life. With Edward, Richard H. New York: Association Press, 1918.
- The Christian Demand for Social Reconstruction. Philadelphia: W.H. Jenkins. 1918a.
- The Gospel for a Working World. New York: Missionary Education Movement of the United States and Canada. 1918b.
- The Religion of Democracy. Boston: Murray Press. 1918c.
- The New Social Order: Principles and Programs. New York: Macmillan. 1919.
- The Opportunity for Religion in the Present World Situation. New York: The Womans Press. 1919.
- Social Unrest in the United States. New York: Methodist Federation for Social Service. 1919.
- Repression of Civil Liberties in the United States (1918–1923). Chicago: American Sociological Society. 1923.
- The Profit Motive: Is It Indispensable to Industry. New York: League for Industrial Democracy. 1924.
- Ethical Aspects of Industrialism. Beijing: Peking Leader Press. 1925.
- The New Social Order: Principles and Programs. New York: Macmillan. 1926.
- Creative Ideas in the Orient. Bloomington, Illinois: Public School Publishing Co. 1926.
- Our Economic Morality and the Ethic of Jesus. New York: Macmillan. 1929.
- Which Way Religion?. New York: Macmillan. 1931.
- In Place of Profit: Social Incentives in the Soviet Union. New York: Scribner's. 1933.
- Fighting to Live. New York: American League Against War and Fascism. 1934.
- The Development of Fascism in the United States. New York: American League Against War and Fascism. 1936.
- Spain's Democracy Talks to America: An Interview. New York: American League Against War and Fascism. 1936.
- The Fascist International. New York: American League Against War and Fascism. 1937.
- Concerted Action for Peace. New York: American League for Peace and Democracy. 1938.
- Democracy and Social Change. New York: Modern Age Books. 1940.
- The Soviet Spirit. New York: International Publishers. 1944.
- Soviet Democracy. New York: Soviet Russia Today. 1947.
- The Story of Soviet-American Relations, 1917–1958. New York: National Council of American–Soviet Friendship. 1959.
- The Harry F. Ward Sampler: A Selection from His Writings, 1914–1963. Edited by Rubinstein, Annette T. Ardsley, New York: Methodist Federation for Social Action. 1963.

=== Selected articles ===
- "The Kaiser and Others: The Treatment of International Offenders in the Light of Penal Reform". The World Tomorrow. Vol. 2, no. 11. New York: Fellowship Press. 1919. pp. 298–303.
- "Why I Believe in Giving Justice". The Biblical World. 54 (4): 348–351. 1920. doi:10.1086/476415. ISSN 0190-3578. JSTOR 3136154.
- "The Bible and the Proletarian Movement". The Journal of Religion. 1 (3): 271–281. 1921. doi:10.1086/480203. ISSN 1549-6538. JSTOR 1195269.
- "The Moral Valuation of Our Economic Order". The Journal of Religion. 1 (4): 416–417. 1921. doi:10.1086/480223. ISSN 1549-6538. JSTOR 1195160.
- "The Function of the Church in Industry". Annals of the American Academy of Political and Social Science. 103: 96–100. 1922. doi:10.1177/000271622210300120. ISSN 0002-7162. JSTOR 1014960.
- "Social Science and Religion". The Journal of Religion. 2 (5): 476–489. 1922. doi:10.1086/480306. ISSN 1549-6538. JSTOR 1195108.
- "Is Jesus Superfluous?". The Journal of Religion. 10 (4): 471–486. 1930. doi:10.1086/480978. ISSN 1549-6538. JSTOR 1196239. S2CID 170264867.
- "The Development of Fascism in the United States". Annals of the American Academy of Political and Social Science. 180: 55–61. 1935. doi:10.1177/000271623518000109. ISSN 0002-7162. JSTOR 1019182. S2CID 143455916.
- "Organized Religion, the State, and the Economic Order". Annals of the American Academy of Political and Social Science. 256: 72–83. 1948. doi:10.1177/000271624825600109. ISSN 0002-7162. JSTOR 1027374. S2CID 144570257.

== See also ==
- William Montgomery Brown
- Christian communism
