= Brotherhood of the Kingdom =

Religious group

The Brotherhood of the Kingdom was a group of the leading thinkers and advocates of the Social Gospel, founded in 1892 by Walter Rauschenbusch and Leighton Williams. The group was non-denominational, consisting of authors, pastors and orators from a variety of Christian Protestant backgrounds.

== First meeting ==
The first meeting of the brotherhood took place in August, 1893 at the home of member Leighton Williams in Marlborough, New York. Meetings would continue annually until 1915 at this hill-top retreat, with members presenting papers, speeches and debates regarding the social gospel and how the coming kingdom of Jesus necessitated social advocacy on the part of the church.

== Spirit and aims ==
At its first gathering, the brotherhood adopted a mission statement and eight principles to govern its organization, unity, purpose and ongoing commitment to public propagation for the social gospel. These they called the "Spirit and Aims of the Brotherhood."

The Spirit of God is moving men in our generation toward a better understanding of the idea of the Kingdom of God on earth. Obeying the thought of our Master, and trusting in the power and guidance of the Spirit, we form ourselves into a Brotherhood of the Kingdom, in order to re-establish this idea in the thought of the church, and to assist in its practical realization in the world.

1. Every member shall by personal life exemplify obedience to the ethics of Jesus.

2. Each member shall propagate the thoughts of Jesus to the limits of his or her ability, in private conversation, by correspondence, and through the pulpit, platform and press.
3. Each member shall lay special stress on the social aims of Christianity, and shall endeavor to make Christ’s teachings concerning wealth operative in the church.
4. On the other hand, members shall take pains to keep in contact with the common people, and to infuse the religious spirit into the efforts for social amelioration.
5. The members shall seek to strengthen the bond of brotherhood by frequent meetings for prayer and discussion, by correspondence, exchange of articles written, etc.
6. Regular reports shall be made of the work done by members in such manner as the executive committee may appoint.
7. The members shall seek to procure for one another opportunities for public propaganda.
8. If necessary, they shall give their support to one another in the public defense of the truth, and shall jealously guard the freedom of discussion for any man who is impelled by the love of the truth to utter his thoughts.

== Leadership ==
Through their positions as pastors and professors, four members of the brotherhood became the leading voices for its aims and social agenda. Walter Rauschenbusch was a professor of church history at Rochester Baptist Seminary. Leighton Williams was the pastor of Amity Baptist Church in New York City, and also a founding member of the American Economic Association. William Newton Clark was a professor of theology at Colgate Seminary. Samuel Zane Batten was a pastor and founding member of the Northern Baptist Convention.

Rauschenbusch was the most widely known of these four, and published a leaflet entitled "The Brotherhood of the Kingdom" which was a sort of manifesto for the group. One passage reads:

We desire to see the Kingdom of God once more the great object of Christian preaching; the inspiration of Christian hymnology; the foundation of systematic theology; the enduring motive of evangelistic and missionary work; the religious inspiration of social work and the object to which a Christian man surrenders his life, and in that surrender saves it to eternal life; the common object in which all religious bodies find their unity; the great synthesis in which the regeneration of the spirit, the enlightenment of the intellect, the development of the body, the reform of political life, the sanctification of industrial life, and all that concerns the redemption of humanity shall be embraced.

== Publications ==
The greatest influence of the brotherhood on the Social Gospel movement and intellectual thought was through the publications of its members. The first written work to come out of the group and attract broad attention was Samuel Zane Batten’s "The New Citizenship" published in 1898. This book won recognition and a $600 prize from the American Sunday School Union. It was written as the Social Gospel movement was beginning to align itself with a more liberal theology, and Batten’s aim may have been keeping the movement both socially relevant and grounded in mainstream Christian theology. He wrote:

Christianity is an earth religion, and has to do with the actual things and relations of everyday life, with such real things as homes and stores, factories, and counting rooms; with such real relationships as buying and selling, marrying and giving in marriage, voting and working. Christianity is an effort to transmute and transfigure the dust of our humanity and the life of our world into the righteousness of the living God.

and "The Kingdom of God is all-inclusive and comprehends every interest and relation and activity of man."

Other notable publications of the brotherhood include Batten’s "The Christian State" (1909) and "The Social Task of Christianity" (1911), William Newton Clarke’s "The Ideal of Jesus" (1911), and Rauschenbusch’s "Christianizing the Social Order" (1912.)

== Members ==
New York chapter:

Walter Rauschenbusch
Samuel Zane Batten
Nathaniel Schmidt
George Dana Boardman
Leighton Williams
Louise Seymour Houghton
Rev. W.H. Gardner
William Newton Clarke

Boston chapter:

Roger Babson
E. Tallmadge Root
George W. Coleman
Rev. O.P. Gifford
Woodman Bradbury

== See also ==
- Kingdom movement
- Washington Gladden
- George D. Herron
