= George D. Herron =

American clergyman, writer and activist

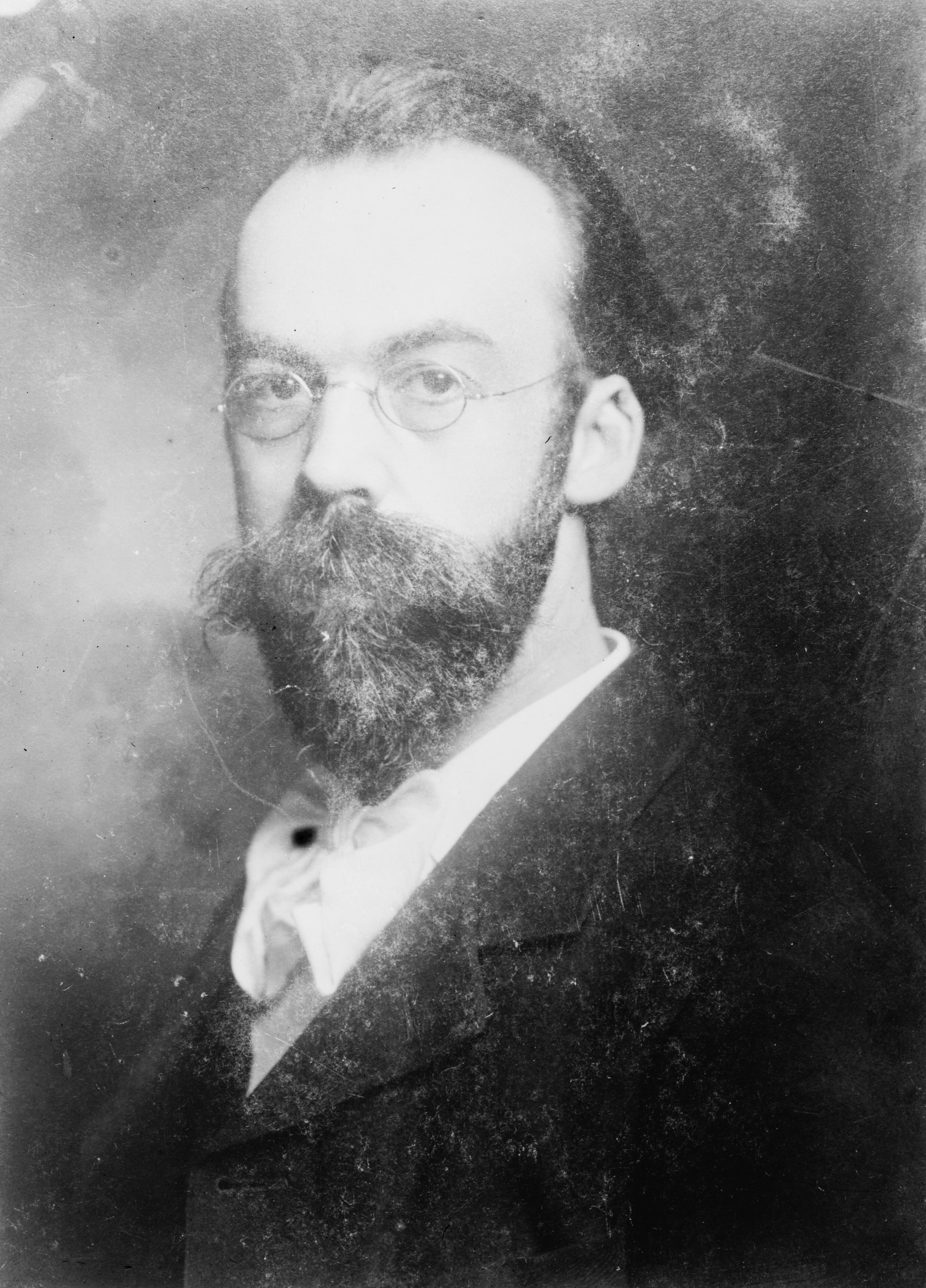

United States Delegate to the Conference on the Princes' Islands
- In office February 1919
- Appointed by: Woodrow Wilson

Personal details
- Born: George Davis Herron; January 21, 1862 Montezuma, Indiana, U.S.
- Died: October 10, 1925 (aged 63) Munich, Germany
- Party: Socialist Labor; Social Democratic; Socialist
- Spouse(s): Mary V. Everhard (m. 1883; div. 1901) Carrie Rand Herron (m. 1901; died 1914) Frieda Bertha Schöberle (m. 1915)
- Children: 5
- Education: Ripon College

George Davis Herron (January 21, 1862 – October 10, 1925) was an American clergyman, lecturer, writer and Christian socialist activist.

Herron is best remembered as a leading exponent of the so-called Social Gospel movement and for his highly publicized divorce and remarriage to the daughter of a wealthy benefactor which scandalized polite society of the day. A self-imposed exile followed.

During World War I, Herron broke with the anti-militarist Socialist Party of America, became a self-assigned diplomat and filed regular intelligence reports on German public opinion to the American and British governments in support of the Allied war effort.

== Biography ==
=== Early years ===
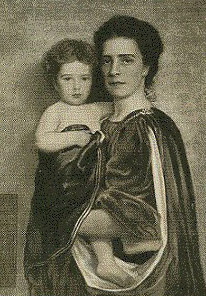
Carrie Rand, Herron's second wife, with the couple's young son, Elbridge Rand Herron.

Herron was born George Davis Herron on January 21, 1862, in Montezuma, Indiana, the son of poor parents, Isabella Davis and William Herron. Herron referred to his father as "a humble man who believed in the Bible and hated unrighteousness", with Christian ancestors dating back to the days of the Scottish Reformation. His mother, similarly dedicated to Christianity, Herron characterized as "an invalid." Herron's father was identified as the decisive intellectual force of his boyhood, with Herron noting his role in teaching him to read as well as being the one who "selected my books and directed my thoughts."

After serving for a time as an apprentice to a printer, Herron enrolled at Ripon College in Wisconsin, his only formal education.

In 1883, Herron married Mary Everhard. The couple had at least four children together, including Newman Everhard Herron (1883–1884), Margaret Vennette Herron (1885–1973), William Everhard Herron (1888–1958) and Miriam Coyle Herron (1895–1983). George D. Herron also had children with later wives including Elbridge Rand Herron (1902–1935), and George Davis Herron (1909–1986) with Carrie Rand, and Jarvis W. W. Herron (1918–1973) with Frieda Bertha Schoberle.

=== Theological career ===
Herron became a Congregationalist minister in 1883. He was the pastor of a Congregational church in Lake City, Minnesota, from 1890 to 1891, before moving to another church at Burlington, Iowa. He would remain there for 17 months, preaching twice weekly on Sunday morning and evening. Many of Herron's sermons were published in the pages of the local newspaper and two or three volumes of these were collected in hard covers. Young men of the church he organized into a Christian Social Union, to which he lectured each Monday evening; a similar gathering was held for young women every Tuesday. He also attended over a midweek meeting of the church every Thursday evening.

Herron became interested in the Social Gospel movement and organized a study group called the Institute of Christian Sociology while in Iowa. It was in Minnesota that Herron first achieved widespread notoriety, when he delivered in 1890 a provocative sermon, titled "The Message of Jesus to Men of Wealth", before the Minnesota Congregationalist Club in Minneapolis. According to historian Howard Quint:

Bluntly, Herron told his audience that the existing social and religious order was wrong because it placed a premium on competition, self-interest, and material power. Such a civilization failed to secure morality and justice, since it put the weak at the mercy of the strong and at the same time minimized the paramount Christian principles of stewardship and sacrifice. The day was coming, said Herron, in which a truly Christian social order would exist on earth, the fulfillment in the here and now of God's Kingdom of Heaven. In such a society the ordering of things would be in accordance with His divine sanction.

Herron's sermon was published in The Christian Union magazine and thereafter reprinted as a pamphlet, gaining the author a national readership for the first time. Quint notes that Herron was unceasing and outspoken in his condemnation of the excesses of the rich, calling Herron a "stormy petrel" who "compellingly challenged the social right of the wealthy to their possessions and vigorously preached a powerful gospel of social redemption" and was "likened by his admirers to the Old Testament prophets." Quint remarks that this earned Herron not only a "host of idolizing followers", but also a "sizeable number of critics who, in varying degrees of hostility, considered him a menace to established social and religious institutions."

One of those impressed with the vision and energy of the young preacher was a wealthy parishioner, Elizabeth D. Rand. Rand decided to put Herron into a position where he could reach more people with his ideas by endowing a new chair in Applied Christianity at Iowa College (now Grinnell) on Herron's behalf. Beginning in 1893 and for the next six years, Herron taught on campus, gaining national renown given the novelty of the subject matter. Also making the move to Grinnell was the daughter of his benefactor, Carrie Rand, who was appointed Dean of Women at Grinnell. This brought the married Mr. Herron and the young Miss Rand into regular contact, ultimately resulting in a love affair which estranged Herron from his wife and family. Combined with his outspoken political views, this provided fodder for Herron's opponents, who forced him to resign his teaching position at the Congregationalist college in 1899.

Herron eventually moved out of his home with Mary Everhard, who divorced him on grounds of desertion in 1901. Polite society was scandalized by the minister-turned-socialist father of five who had taken up with a younger woman; the court sensationally awarded his former wife and children Carrie Rand's personal fortune of $60,000 at the time of his divorce. Herron and Rand married in May 1901 in an unconventional ceremony in Rochester, New York, officiated by Christian socialist minister William Thurston Brown. Herron was subsequently defrocked from the Congregational Church ministry by the action of the Council of Iowa Congregational Churches which pronounced Herron "guilty of immoral and unChristian conduct." Shortly afterward, the couple moved to Florence, Italy along with the older Rand in a self-imposed exile to escape from publicity.

=== Political activities ===
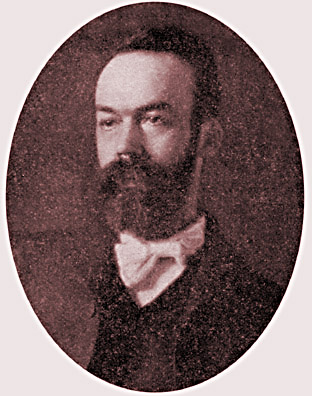
Herron c. 1900

From 1892 until 1899, Herron was a quiet supporter of the Socialist Labor Party of America, the intellectual leader of which was party newspaper editor Daniel De Leon. Herron exited the party in the aftermath of its bitter 1899 faction fight and joined the Social Democratic Party of America headed by Victor L. Berger and Eugene V. Debs, only then making his status as a socialist a matter of public knowledge. He actively campaigned for Debs in the presidential election of 1900.

Herron was an outspoken advocate of unity between the dissident faction of the Socialist Labor Party of America headed by Henry Slobodin and Morris Hillquit with the Chicago-based Social Democratic Party, speaking and wrote on behalf of the controversial matter in the socialist press. He was a founding member of the result of this organizational union, the Socialist Party of America, in the summer of 1901. A gifted public speaker, Herron was called upon to deliver the nominating speech for Debs at the 1904 National Convention of the Socialist Party, held in Chicago.

In 1905, his benefactor Rand died, leaving a will, which allotted $200,000 to "carry on and further the work to which I have devoted the later years of my life." Herron and Carrie Rand Herron were named the trustees of this fund, which was used to establish a library and school for socialist education, the Rand School of Social Science. This institution carried on for the next half century, eventually donating its library to New York University at the time of its dissolution, where it formed the initial core of today's Tamiment Library and Robert F. Wagner Archives.

=== Emigration ===
When Carrie Rand Herron died in 1914, she left Herron with two young sons to care for. He subsequently married a third time.

The summer of 1914 saw the shattering of the fragile European peace with coming of World War I. Herron immediately cast his lot with the Entente Powers of Great Britain, France, Tsarist Russia and Italy in the conflict with the combined forces of the German and Austro-Hungarian empires. As a committed individualist, Herron strongly disliked the Prussian conception of the centralized and militarized state and was hostile to Germany from the outset.

Historian Mitchell Pirie Briggs neatly summarized Herron's position thusly:

And so it came about that Professor Herron, pacifist, Socialist, and internationalist, became ardently pro-Ally at the beginning of the war and remained pro-Ally to the end. His faith never left him. Knowing as he did the iniquities of the Entente Powers, the secret treaties and understandings, the jockeying and trading for economic and political advantages even during the progress of the war, and the frightful anachronism of the Russian autocracy, he could still believe that the only hope for a change world lay in the overthrow of the German system. The evils in the polity and social organization of England, France, and Italy were bad enough, but they were eradicable; the evils in Prussianism were basic, innate, ineradicable. It was inevitable, therefore, that he should have desired the entry of the United States into the struggle.

With the outbreak of hostilities, Herron moved from Italy to Geneva, Switzerland, so as to be more nearly "in the center of the conflict." In 1916, when President Woodrow Wilson campaigned successfully for re-election under the slogan "He Kept Us Out of War", Herron, as a vocal public intellectual in Europe, contended that Wilson was far from neutral towards the European conflict and inferred that he was waiting for the appropriate juncture to enter the United States into the conflict. Herron was considered in Europe as among the most reliable interpreters of the intentions of the Wilson administration, an assessment that was only enhanced when Herron's pronouncements came true in April 1917, only the second month of Wilson's second term as president, with American entry into the war.

Unsurprisingly, Herron was bitterly opposed to the decision of the Socialist Party of America to continue its militant opposition to the conflict at its 1917 Emergency National Convention held in St. Louis, Missouri. Herron broke with the party and also terminated his support of the Rand School. Herron was the featured speaker on the Italian situation at a closed-door conference of about 25 key American decision-makers called in Paris late in November 1917 by American Ambassador William Graves Sharp. Thereafter, Herron began contributing regular written reports to the American Legation at Berne, Switzerland. In addition to his intelligence work on behalf of the United States Department of State, Herron also supplied the British War Office and British Foreign Office with similar reports. Herron's intelligence and analysis was greatly valued by the British, who allotted him 1,000 francs per month so that stenographic help could be hired.

It was Herron's function to pass to his superiors details of his conversations and correspondence with various German contacts and acquaintances, many of whom were academics. These reports often took the form of appeals by his German associates for some particular action by President Wilson and his administration. Herron consistently maintained the need for a dictated peace through German surrender, an eventuality which came to pass in November 1918. Herron was greatly disappointed with the 1919 Paris Peace Conference, with a draconian Treaty of Versailles which made a "perjury" of official Allied war objectives. Regardless of his unhappiness, once the Treaty of Versailles was signed and it became clear that the choice at hand was that document or no peace treaty at all, Herron put his grave misgivings aside and joined with those urging the treaty's ratification. It was the Peace of Paris "or no peace at all – perhaps for more than a generation", Herron argued in a published article.

In response to the onerous and punitive terms imposed upon defeated Germany, Herron published a book in 1921 entitled The Defeat in the Victory. For Herron, Woodrow Wilson's war to "Make the World Safe for Democracy" had ended up as "The Great Disappointment." In 1918, Herron conveyed to Wilson the invitation of Marc-Ernest Peter (1873–1966)the President of the Grand Conseil de la République et canton de Genève to locate the League of Nations in Geneva. Herron commended Geneva's traditions of religious liberty and political democracy and its contributions, especially from John Calvin.

In 1919, Herron moved back from his villa Le Retour on Lake Geneva to his villa La Primola in Fiesole. On August 16, 1922, he published in London, George Allen & Unwin Ltd. Ruskin House, 40 Museum Street, W. C. I, the book: Revival of Italy in which he praised the social reforms of the fascist regime of Benito Mussolini.

=== Death and legacy ===
Herron died on October 10, 1925. He was 63 years old at the time of his death.

Herron's papers are housed at several institutions. The bulk of Herron's papers are located at the Hoover Institution Archives at Stanford University in Palo Alto, California. The Herron material at Stanford consists of some 30 manuscript boxes, plus scrapbooks and two microfilm reels. An additional 1.3 linear feet of material at the library of Grinnell College in Grinnell, Iowa, and 0.25 linear feet at the Bobst Library of New York University in New York City.

Other significant Herron correspondence may be found in the A. M. Simons Papers at the Wisconsin Historical Society in Madison.

== Works ==
=== Books and pamphlets ===
- The Message of Jesus to Men of Wealth. New York: Fleming H. Revell, 1891.
- The Larger Christ. Chicago : Fleming H. Revell Co., 1891.
- The Call of the Cross: Four College Sermons. Chicago : Fleming H. Revell Co., 1892.
- A Plea for the Gospel. Boston: Thomas Y. Crowell, 1892.
- The New Redemption: A Call to the Church to Reconstruct Society According to the Gospel of Christ. Boston: Thomas Y. Crowell, 1893.
- The Christian State: A Political Vision of Christ: A Course of Six Lectures Delivered in Churches in Various American Cities. Boston: Thomas Y. Crowell, 1895.
- Social Meanings of Religious Experiences: A Course of Lecture-Sermons. Boston: Thomas Y. Crowell, 1896.
- Between Caesar and Jesus. Boston: Thomas Y. Crowell, 1899.
- A Confession of Social Faith: An Address Before the Chicago Single Tax Club, at Willard Hall, Friday Evening, March 17, Stenographically Reported. Chicago: Chicago Single-Tax Club, 1899.
- American Imperialism: An Address Delivered April 12, 1899. Chicago: Social Forum, 1899.
- The Social System and the Christian Conscience. Liverpool: Liverpool Fabian Society, 1900.
- Why I Am a Socialist: Address at a Mass Meeting of the Social Democratic Party at Central Music Hall, Chicago, Sept. 29, 1900. Chicago: Charles H. Kerr & Co., 1900.
- The Day of Judgment. Chicago: Charles H. Kerr & Co., 1904.
- From Revolution to Revolution: An Address in Memory of the Paris Commune of 1871. Chicago: Charles H. Kerr & Co., 1907.
- William Mailly as a Socialist Type. New York: n.p., 1912.
- The Menace of Peace. New York: M. Kennerley, 1917.
- Woodrow Wilson and the World's Peace. New York: M. Kennerley, 1917.
- Germanism and the American Crusade. New York: M. Kennerley, 1918.
- The Greater War. New York: M. Kennerley, 1919.
- The Defeat in the Victory. London: C. Palmer, 1921.
- The Revival of Italy. London: George Allen & Unwin, 1922.

=== Articles ===
- "Class Consciousness," The Socialist (Seattle), whole no. 156 (August 2, 1903), pg. 1.
- "The Peace of Paris and the Youth of Europe," The World Tomorrow (New York), vol. 3, no. 2 (Feb. 1920), pp. 35–44.

== See also ==
- Brotherhood of the Kingdom
- Kingdom movement
- Washington Gladden
