= MFSA =

MFSA may refer to:

- Malta Financial Services Authority, a Maltese financial regulator
- Methodist Federation for Social Action, an independent network of United Methodist clergy and laity
