= First Congregational Church (Columbus, Ohio) =

Historic church in Ohio, United States

- U.S. National Register of Historic Places
- Columbus Register of Historic Properties
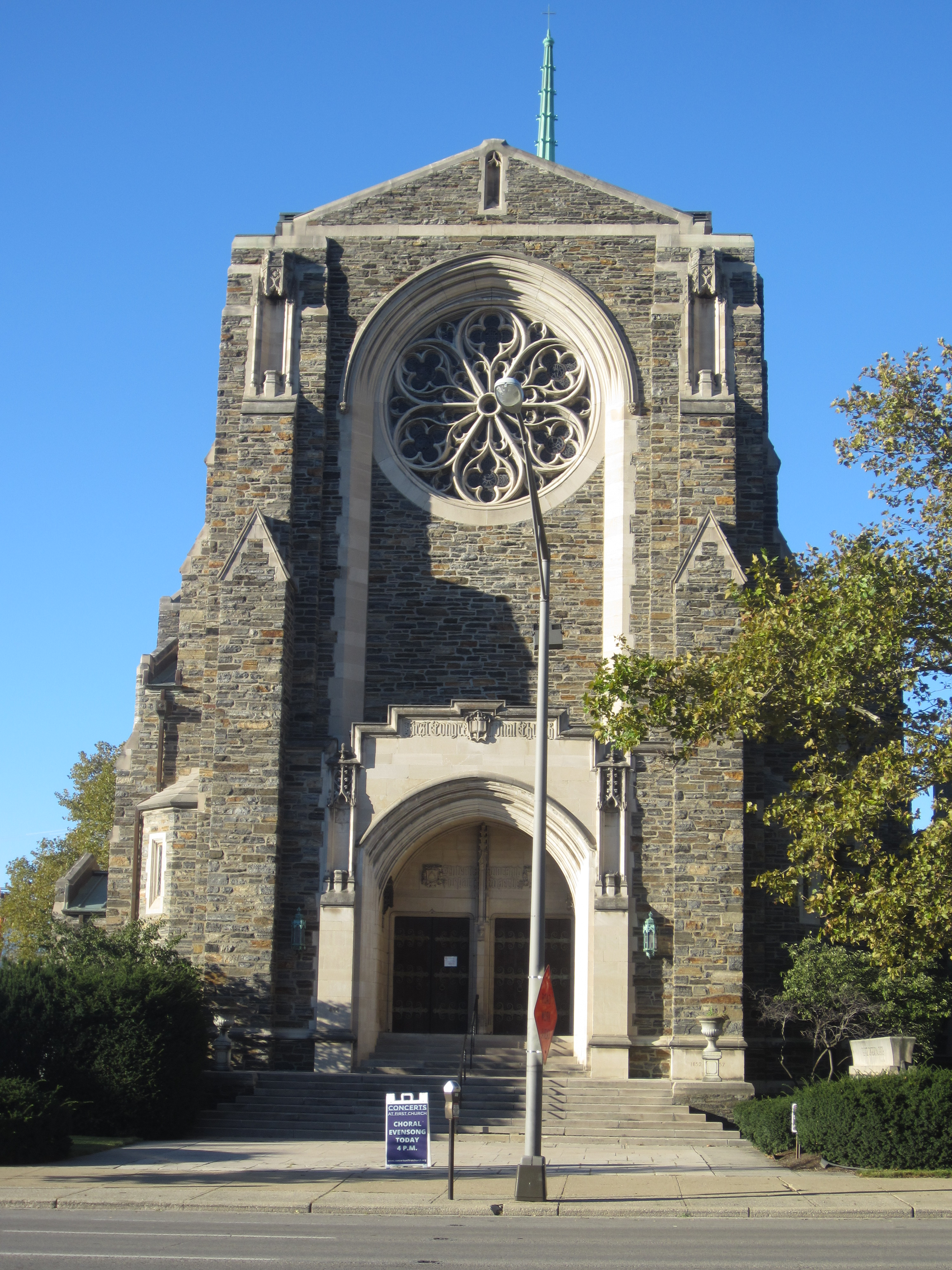
- Interactive map highlighting the church's location
- Location: 444 East Broad St., Columbus, Ohio
- Coordinates: 39°57′51″N 82°59′20″W
- Built: 1931
- Architect: John Russell Pope
- Architectural style: Gothic Revival
- Website: www.first-church.org
- NRHP reference No.: 100007182
- CRHP No.: CR-4
- Designated CRHP: May 10, 1982

The First Congregational Church is a Congregational church located in Columbus, Ohio, United States. The building was listed on the Columbus Register of Historic Properties in 1982 and the National Register of Historic Places in 2021.

The church congregation was formed in 1852. It was made up of a group of abolitionists, a movement that gained traction among Christians in the 1840s. The abolitionists decided to leave the Second Presbyterian Church in Columbus to found their own Congregational community. Thus 42 people transferred church membership on September 24, 1852. Their first church was a frame chapel at the northeast corner of Third Street and Lynn Alley. It was built using a $1,000 loan from the Second Presbyterian Church. The first service was on September 26, 1852, and the charter of organization was signed September 29, 1852. Initially known as the Third Presbyterian Church, the church was renamed to its current title in 1856. With membership increasing, the congregation dedicated a new church building on December 23, 1857, at 73 East Broad Street. Following further membership growth, the congregation dedicated its current Gothic Revival cathedral on December 6, 1931.

The church is known for Washington Gladden, minister there for 36 years. Gladden was an early leader of the Social Gospel and Progressive movements. In 2018, the church led the creation of the neighboring Washington Gladden Social Justice Park, honoring Gladden and other social justice leaders of the city. The 18,000 sq ft (1,700 m^{2}) of park land was already owned by the church, which entered into a public-private partnership to create the space. It is considered the first social justice park in the country.

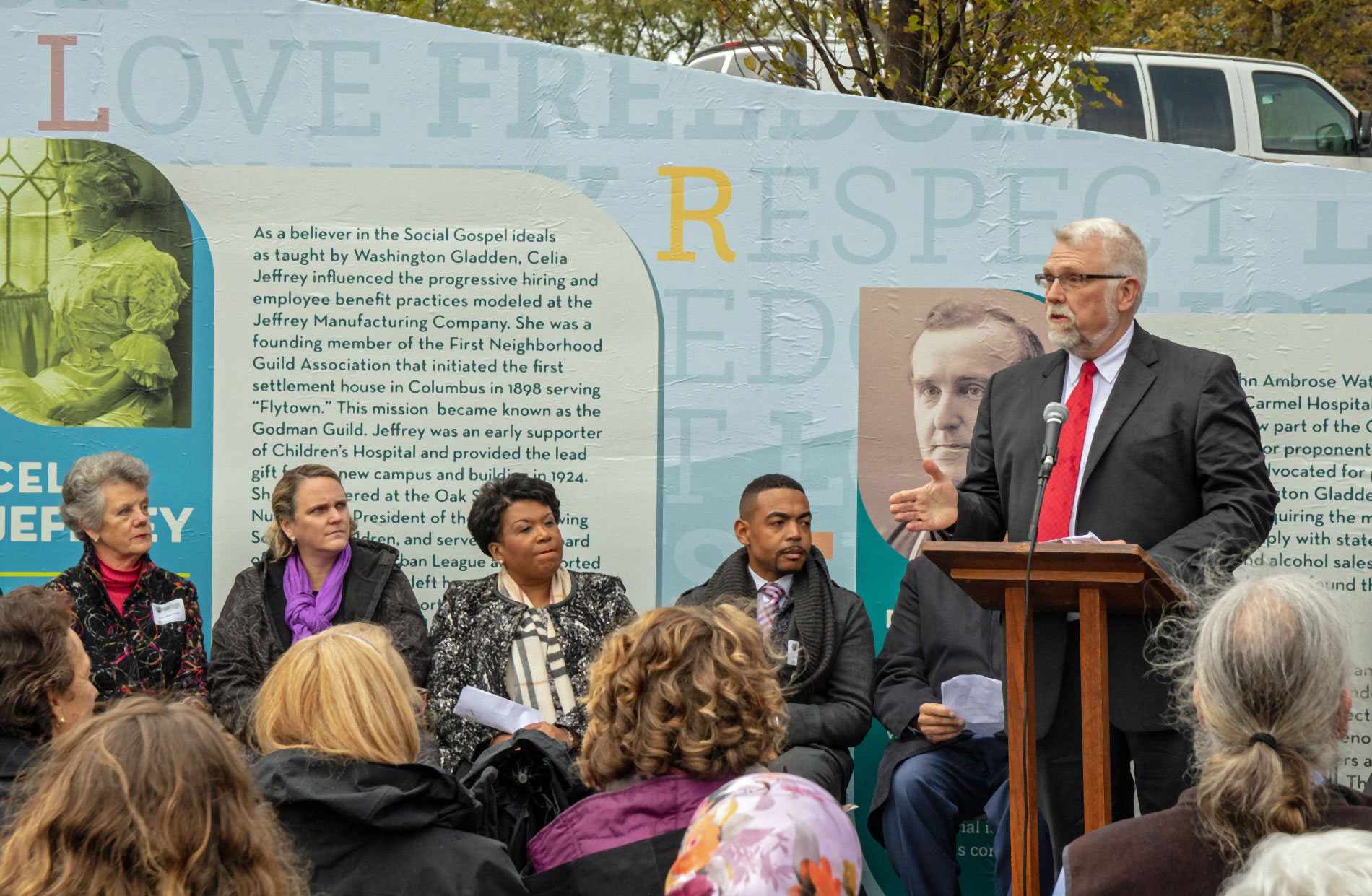
Reverend Timothy C. Ahrens speaking at the Washington Gladden Social Justice Park dedication, 2018

== See also ==
- List of Congregational churches
- National Register of Historic Places listings in Columbus, Ohio
