= Kingdom movement =

The Kingdom movement was the name used by US Christians in the 1890s who wished to carry out improvements in society. The name was later changed to the Social Gospel.

An early national figure in the Social Gospel movement was Washington Gladden, the minister of a Congregational Church in Columbus, Ohio, in 1882. He was an outspoken critic of laissez-faire economics. A few years later, another Congregationalist minister, George D. Herron, travelled around the US giving a sermon on "The Message of Jesus for Men of Wealth," a condemnation of wealth and its acquisition. He believed that state socialism was the only Christian answer to the conflict between capital and labour and mounted a vocal attack against capitalism and the laissez-faire system. He argued that capitalism was based on the sinfulness of human greed and self-interest. His dream was to build "the Kingdom of God" on this earth, which led to the name of the Kingdom Movement.

The term "Social Gospel" did not come into common use until the twentieth century. As one historian has said, "In the mid-1890s the most prominent manifestation of what we now call the Social Gospel movement was the Kingdom movement."

== See also ==
- Brotherhood of the Kingdom
