= George Albert Coe =

American psychologist and political activist

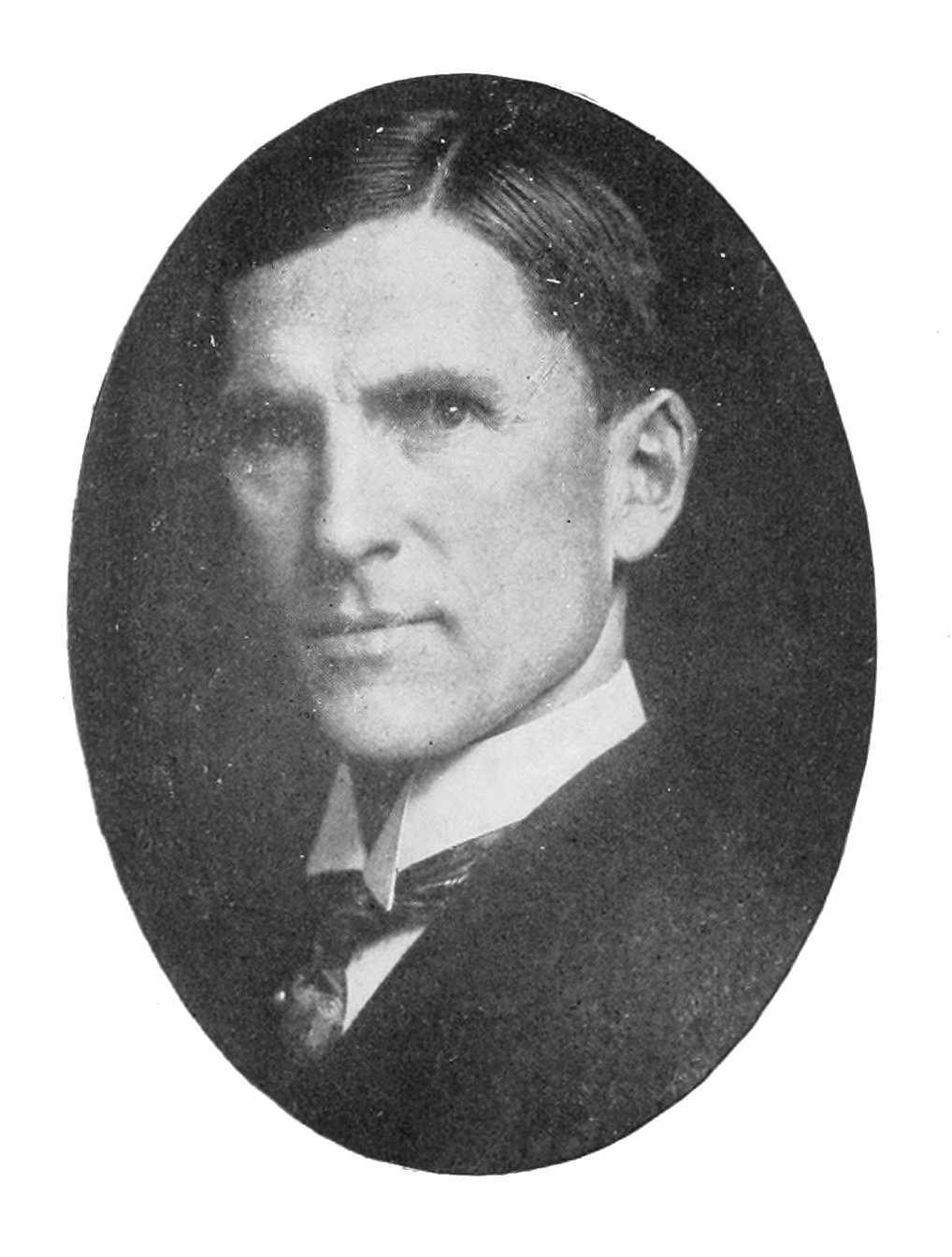
- Born: March 26, 1862; Monroe County, New York
- Died: 1951 (aged 88–89)
- Relatives: Descendants of Robert Coe

George Albert Coe (March 26, 1862 – 1951) was an educational theorist and scholar of religion. Alongside William James and Edwin Diller Starbuck he has been described as "one of the three leading pioneers in psychology of religion". During his time he was a leading figure in the field of religious education.

== Biography ==
Coe was the son of a Methodist minister. In 1884 he completed his BA in the University of Rochester and subsequently received an MA in theology and a PhD in philosophy from Boston University. He also studied at the University of Berlin from 1890 to 1891. After completing his studies he held a professorship of philosophy at the University of Southern California and the Northwestern University before moving to the Union Theological Seminary in Columbia University. Here he was appointed professor of religious education and psychology.

He played a role in the foundation of the Religious Education Association (becoming President in 1909) and served as the editor of The Social Frontier, a publication of the Progressive Education Association. His writings promoted Liberal Protestantism and the Social Gospel. Coe was a Methodist who helped found the Methodist Federation for Social Action. Additionally he held memberships of the American Philosophical Association, the American Psychological Association, and the American Association for the Advancement of Science.

In the 1930s he founded the Committee on Militarism in Education and was involved in the American Committee for the Protection of Foreign Born. In the later part of his life he became sympathetic to Marxist ethics, stating that "Marx raised the fundamental ethical questions whether it is humane or just that a man's sustenance should depend on his contributing by his labor to the private profit of another". He considered that "we are not done with Marxism when we weight the merits and demerits of the Soviet government, nor when we choose between communist and anti-communist ideology" due to this ethical concern. He was one of 450 figures to sign a statement defending the "constitutional rights of the Communist Party of the United States" and was involved in the 'National Non-Partisan Committee' to defend those in the Smith Act trials of Communist Party leaders.

His personal papers are held at the archives of Yale and Northwestern University. An adherent of liberal theology, his papers contain correspondences with liberal theologians such as Emil Brunner, Adelaide Teague Case, Harrison S. Elliot, and Harry Emerson Fosdick. He was awarded an honorary Doctor of Letters degree from the University of Southern California.

== Bibliography ==
=== Books ===
- The Spiritual Life: Studies in the Science of Religion (1900)
- The Religion Of A Mature Mind (1902)
- Education in Religion and Morals (1904)
- The Core of Good Teaching (1912)
- The Psychology of Religion (1916)
- A Social Theory of Religious Education (1917)
- Law and Freedom in the School: Can and Cannot, Must (1924)
- What Ails Our Youth? (1925)
- What is Christian Education (1929)
- The Motives of Men (1929)
- What is Religion Doing to our Consciences? (1943)

=== Articles ===
- A study in the dynamics of personal religion in Psychological Review, Vol. 6, No. 5., pp. 484–505.
- Religious Education as a Part of General Education in The Biblical World, Vol. 21, No. 6. (June 1903), pp. 440–6.
- Religion as a Factor in Individual and Social Development in The Biblical World, Vol. 23, No. 1 (Jan., 1904), pp. 37–47
- The Philosophy of the Movement for Religious Education in the American Journal of Theology, Vol. 8, No. 2 (Apr., 1904), pp. 225–239
- The Religious Spirit in the Secondary School in The School Review, Vol. 13, No. 8 (Oct., 1905), pp. 581–596
- Religious Value in The Journal of Philosophy, Psychology and Scientific Methods, Vol. 5, No. 10 (May 7, 1908), pp. 253–256
- What Does Modern Psychology Permit Us to Believe in Respect to Regeneration? in The American Journal of Theology, Vol. 12, No. 3 (Jul., 1908), pp. 353–368
- The Mystical as a Psychological Concept in The Journal of Philosophy, Vol. 6, No. 8 (Apr. 15, 1909), pp. 197–202
- Religion and the Subconscious in The American Journal of Theology, Vol. 13, No. 3 (Jul., 1909), pp. 337–349
- Notes on the Recent Census of Religious Bodies in the American Journal of Sociology, Vol. 15, No. 6 (May, 1910), pp. 806–816
- A New Natural History of Religion in the Harvard Theological Review, Vol. 3, No. 3 (Jul., 1910), pp. 366–372
- The Distinguishing Mark of a Christian in The American Journal of Theology, Vol. 16, No. 2 (Apr., 1912), pp. 256–267
- The Origin and Nature of Children's Faith in God in the American Journal of Theology, Vol. 18, No. 2 (Apr., 1914), pp. 169–190
- On Having Friends: A Study of Social Values in The Journal of Philosophy, Vol. 12, No. 6 (Mar. 18, 1915), pp. 155–161
- The Religious Breakdown of Ministry in The Journal of Religion, Vol. 1, No. 1 (Jan., 1921), pp. 18–29
- Who is Enriched by the Enrichment of Worship? in The Journal of Religion, Vol. 3, No. 1 (Jan., 1923), pp. 22–33
- What Constitutes a Scientific Interpretation of Religion? in The Journal of Religion, Vol. 6, No. 3 (May, 1926), pp. 225–235
- What Makes a College Christian? in Christian Education, Vol. 14, No. 1 (October, 1930), pp. 8–15
- My Own Little Theatre in Religion in Transition, edited by Vergilius Ferm (1937)
