= Methodist Federation for Social Action =

American Christian organization

The Methodist Federation for Social Action (MFSA) is an independent network of United Methodist clergy and laity working for justice in the areas of peace, poverty, and people's rights since 1907.

== History ==
=== Founding ===
The first decades of the 20th century were a time of heightened awareness in the United States of poverty and social inequality. In an effort to transform the social order and address human suffering, members of the Methodist Episcopal Church (MEC) created in 1907 the organization that would come to be called the Methodist Federation for Social Service and later the Methodist Federation for Social Action. The aims of their Methodist Federation for Social Service (MFSS) were inspired in a large part by the importance that Methodism founder John Wesley placed on work for the betterment of humankind, and shared the theological grounding of the broader Protestant Social Gospel movement, which articulated a normative relationship between the Biblical teachings of Jesus Christ and efforts toward systemic social change.

Psychologist George Albert Coe was a co-founder.

Originally the Methodist Federation for Social Service, MFSA was founded in 1907 in Washington, DC, after meeting with President Roosevelt. Several Methodist Episcopal clergy (including Frank Mason North, author of "Where Cross the Crowded Ways of Life") organized the Federation to direct church attention to the enormous human suffering among the working class. The organization supported labor unions and held socialist views, calling industrial capitalism an "unchristian and antisocial".

MFSA met with immediate success in rallying American Methodists around Social Gospel issues, and the MEC General Conference of 1908 adopted the denomination's historic Social Creed which was penned by the leadership of the Federation. The social creed has been adapted several times but is also the basis for many of the civil and human rights laws that exist today. The lines between the nominally independent Federation and the MEC proper were quickly blurred as the former was charged with the coordination of Social Creed-related ministries. The collaboration was a productive one, however, with MFSA members encouraging significant contributions to the labor rights, temperance, and women's suffrage movements by the denomination, while conducting cutting-edge advocacy under their organization's own auspices.

=== McConnell and Ward era ===
For almost four decades thereafter the Federation was led by Bishop Francis John McConnell and Harry F. Ward, an outstanding church ethicist and activist. During the 1920s and 1930s this leadership was fully shared by Winifred Chappell, a deaconess and devoted advocate for the workers' struggle.

In the 1930s the Federation adopted as its goal the replacement of an economic system based on the struggle for profit by "social-economic planning to develop a society without class or group discriminations and privileges." By the onset of the 1930s and the Great Depression, the MFSA consensus position on economic affairs had come to question the basic capitalist underpinnings of the U.S. economy, and the Federation joined the ranks of those advocating for a functional socialist alternative.

In 1932, the church voiced its support for MFSA's views, but by 1936, the socialist viewpoint was a major source of controversy within the Methodist Church. The Church dropped the Social Creed from the Book of Discipline in that year, but reinstated it in 1939.

=== World War II and the Red Scare ===
The 1940s were a time of continued growth for the MFSA, as it continued its economic justice activities while contributing to the World War II peace movement. The organization, alongside the Women's Division, also strongly lobbied to end segregation in the church.

MFSA attained the height of its growth just following World War II under the leadership of Jack McMichael. By 1950, the MFSA was highly influential in the Methodist Church. While the MFSA had only 5,800 members compared to 9 million in the entire Methodist Church, this membership included half of the church's 16 bishops, as well as having representatives in all the major seminaries at the time. However, with the coming of the anti-communist hysteria of the McCarthy period, relations with The Methodist Church became very strained and the Federation came under sharp attack. In his article Methodism's Pink Fringe, Stanley High accused the MFSA of being pro-Soviet. The group was investigated by the House un-American Activities Committee in 1952. The MFSA was one of the chief victims of McCarthyism among religious groups, an attack vicious enough that the Church dropped its connection with the MFSA that year, and the MFSA continued as an independent organization.

In the wake of these events MFSA experienced a serious decline. However, a dedicated remnant of volunteers kept the group operating, and in 1960, new director Lee Ball began the rebuilding process and started a campaign against the Vietnam War.

=== Post-war ===
Over the past six decades MFSA has experienced a broad revival and has re-established the Federation as a force within United Methodism. In 1974 MFSA sent organizers to support the striking non-professionals at the UM hospital in Pikeville, Kentucky. In 1979 the Federation issued a documented study of the New Far Right presence in the denomination and rallied forces to stem its influence. MFSA was the leading force in the struggle for UM support of disinvestment from South Africa, especially by the Board of Pensions. The MFSA, inspired by Latin American liberation theology, resumed its criticism of capitalism.

The church advocated for gay rights in the 1980s and 1990s. The Federation continues to make a major impact every four years at the denomination's General Conference. New MFSA conference chapters continue to be organized and now total 38 chapters, with representation in every jurisdiction. There are several new chapters in the formation process.

The Federation unites activist United Methodists to promote action on the liberation issues of peace, poverty and people's right while confronting the church and society and to witness to the transformation of the social order that is intrinsic to the church's entire life, including its evangelism, preaching, counseling, and spirituality.

== See also ==
- Reconciling Ministries Network
- Temperance organizations
- Taskforce of United Methodists on Abortion and Sexuality
