= First Baptist Church (Philadelphia) =

Baptist Church in Philadelphia, Pennsylvania

Coordinates: 39.950608°N 75.168841°W

First Baptist Church of Philadelphia
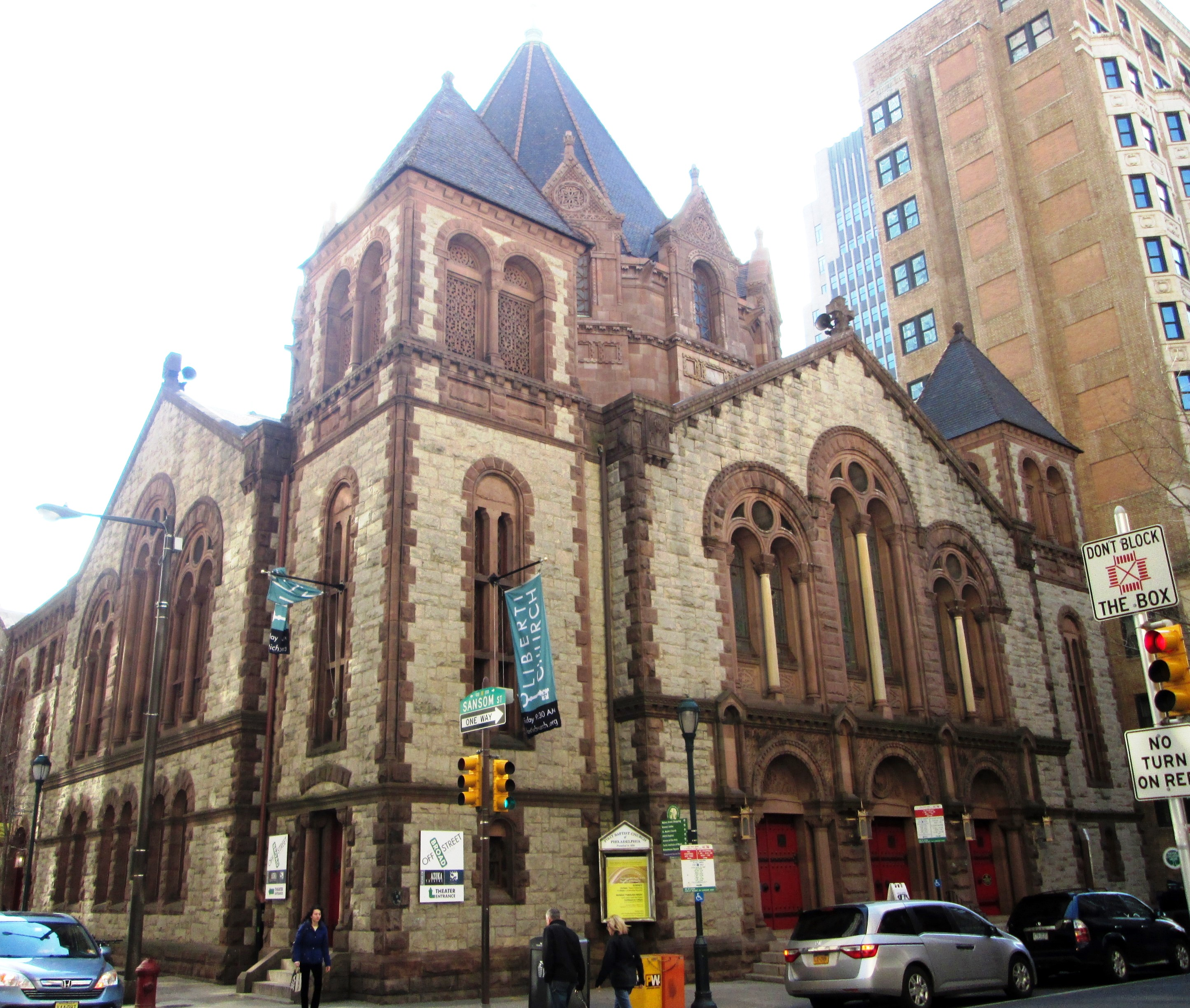
- First Baptist Church of Philadelphia
- Address: 123-129 S 17th St Philadelphia, Pennsylvania
- Country: United States of America
- Denomination: American Baptist Churches USA
- Website: Official website

History
- Status: Active
- Founded: 11 December 1698

Architecture
- Architect: Edgar Viguers Seeler
- Style: Byzantine revival, Richardsonian Romanesque
- Years built: 1899-1900

The First Baptist Church of Philadelphia is a Baptist church founded in 1698 in Philadelphia, Pennsylvania, United States. The current building, dating to 1899, is located in the Rittenhouse Square neighborhood of Center City.

== History ==
The First Baptist Church of Philadelphia began on December 11, 1698 in a small abandoned building in Philadelphia known as the Barbadoes Storehouse. The congregation obtained a new meeting place at Anthony Morris' Brewhouse at the corner of Water and Dock Streets.

In 1707, the congregation took over the Keithian Quaker Meeting House at Second and Market Streets. In 1731 the meeting house was replaced by a brick building called LaGrange Place. In 1808, LaGrange Place was replaced by a larger structure. During this time period, from 1707 until about 1860, the church used the south side of the 200 block of Arch Street as a burial ground.

In 1761, Morgan Edwards emigrated from England to become pastor at the First Baptist Church. He went on to become largely responsible for the establishment of Rhode Island College which became Brown University.

Samuel Miles, a military officer in the American Revolutionary War and mayor of Philadelphia was a deacon in the church.

In 1806, William Staughton became pastor at the church. Staughton went on to become the president of Columbian College (now George Washington University) in 1823.

William Bucknell, the wealthy businessman and benefactor to Bucknell University, was a trustee to the church.

Robert Lowry, professor of literature, Baptist minister and composer of gospel hymns, was baptized at First Baptist Church and taught in one of the church's missions Sunday Schools.

In 1864, George Dana Boardman became pastor and led the congregation for 30 years. Boardman was known as an abolitionist and a strong supporter of the Union. Boardman lectured at the University of Pennsylvania where he also served as University Chaplain and on the Board of Trustees. Boardman served four terms as President of the American Baptist Missionary Union. He published over 150 books, monographs, lectures and other papers.

Dr. William Williams Keen, known as "the father of American surgery", was a deacon of First Baptist Church throughout his life.

The nave of the current church, with the pipe organ visible, during a presentation by YouTuber and urban planner Ray Delahanty.

The congregation moved from 2nd & Arch into a new church building at Broad and Arch Streets in 1855. The current church at 17th and Sansom was built in 1900 by Edgar Viguers Seeler and is a blend of Byzantine and Richardsonian Romanesque, revival Romanesque styles.

In 2014, the First Baptist Church was sold due to dwindling financial resources and a challenging building maintenance schedule. The church was sold to the Liberti Church, a member congregation in the Reformed Church in America. The First Baptist Church congregation still worships in the church under a lease agreement with the Liberti Church.

In 2016 a lot at 218 Arch Street came under private development and contractors began excavating to create a foundation for a new building. Construction was stopped when a large number of burials were found. Remains at this site were supposed to have been moved to Mount Moriah Cemetery (Philadelphia) when the church moved in 1855, but as was common for the time the movement of the remains was incomplete. A team of scientists headed by the Mütter Museum collected remains and artifacts from around 500 individuals. A group of scientists is studied the collection under the title The Arch Street Project. The remains were re-buried in eight vaults in the First Baptist Church section of Mount Moriah Cemetery in July 2024.
