= Lewis Zahm =

- Born: Henry Joseph Lewis Zahm; August 7, 1820; Zweibrücken, Bavaria
- Died: December 10, 1890; Seneca, Kansas, U.S.
- Burial place: Seneca Cemetery, Seneca, Kansas
- Military career
- Allegiance: United States; Union
- Branch: Union Army
- Service years: 1861–1863
- Unit: 3rd Ohio Cavalry
- Battles: American Civil War
- Other work: Assessor for Internal Revenue Service

Lewis Zahm (August 7, 1820 – December 10, 1890), sometimes spelled Louis Zahm, was a Union Army colonel during the American Civil War.

== Early life ==
Henry Joseph Lewis Zahm was born on August 7, 1820, in Zweibrücken, Bavaria. He moved to New York in 1836 and then on to Ohio.

== American Civil War ==
Zahm organized the 3rd Ohio Cavalry and was appointed colonel on September 27, 1861. He served as a brigade commander from September 9, 1862, to October 24, 1862, in the Army of the Ohio and from November 5, 1862, to January 5, 1863, in the Army of the Cumberland. He resigned from the volunteers on January 5, 1863.

On March 15, 1867, President Andrew Johnson nominated Zahm for appointment to the grade of brevet brigadier general of volunteers, to rank from March 13, 1865, and the United States Senate confirmed the appointment on March 26, 1867.

== Later life ==
After his service in the Civil War, Zahm was an assessor for the Internal Revenue Service. He moved to Kansas in 1874 and became a stockman. Lewis Zahm died on December 10, 1890, in Seneca, Kansas, where he was buried in Seneca Cemetery.

== See also ==
- List of American Civil War brevet generals (Union)
