= 3rd Ohio Cavalry Regiment =

The 3rd Ohio Cavalry Regiment was a cavalry regiment of the Union Army during the American Civil War.

The regiment was organized in September 1861 by future Colonel Lewis Zahm. In April 1862, it moved with General Don Carlos Buell through Tennessee. During that summer, the 3rd Ohio Cavalry participated in the Siege of Corinth. It later fought at the Battle of Chickamauga. In January 1864, the regiment was re-formed as its three-year term had expired. The unit later participated in raids with Stoneman and Wilson before it was discharged on August 14, 1865. Charles Oliver Brown, D.D. followed his father at the age of thirteen, Major Oliver M. Brown, with the unit, served throughout the war and became the "Boy Bugler" of Sherman's Army.

Several Kelleys Island men volunteered and served in the 3rd Ohio Cavalry including: Pitt Simmons, John Ward, John Monaghan, Stephen French, Michael Hughes, August Raab, John T. Woodford, George Wright, Henry Pope and Jacob Rush (mostly companies A and L). Jacob Rush's involvement in the unit was particularly interesting. He enlisted at the age of 15, was brought home by his parents, then allowed to enlist again a few months later. Just weeks before his enlistment expired, he was sent on one last mission and captured as a spy. He provided a first hand account of his interrogation by General Nathan Bedford Forrest. He spent 8 months in Cahaba Prison where he helped organize a (failed) escape attempt. Upon his release at the end of the war, he was one of the few soldiers who survived the 'Sultana' explosion. He worked his way home and established the Island House resort on Kelleys Island. When that burned in 1877, he moved to Larned, Kansas and played a key role in building that city. He also served as a Kansas State Senator. He was a prolific writer for the local newspaper, the Islander, and shared many stories of his time in service in the 3rd Ohio Cavalry.

== See also ==
- List of Ohio Civil War units
