= Charles Oliver Brown =

American bugler (1848–1941)

Charles Oliver Brown lived to the age of 93 (1848–1941). His life experiences began early when at the age of 11 he drove a team on the canal from Toledo to Cincinnati (Miami and Erie Canal). He served as a bugler in the American Civil War at age 13, became a minister, was a noted speaker in the United States and Canada, and became a key figure in the controversy around General William Tecumseh Sherman's famous remark, "War is Hell." Following the Civil War, Brown survived a highly publicized blackmail incident in San Francisco, became a sought after speaker, and was frequently quoted on his writings on the development of Congregational churches.

== From Michigan to Ohio ==
Charles Oliver Brown was born in Battle Creek, Michigan, on July 22, 1848, but moved to Toledo, Ohio, at the age of 4 where his father had a blacksmith shop. At the age of 11, he drove a team on the canal from Toledo to Cincinnati (Miami and Erie Canal). He attended the Toledo Grammar School.

== The "Boy Bugler" of Sherman's Army ==
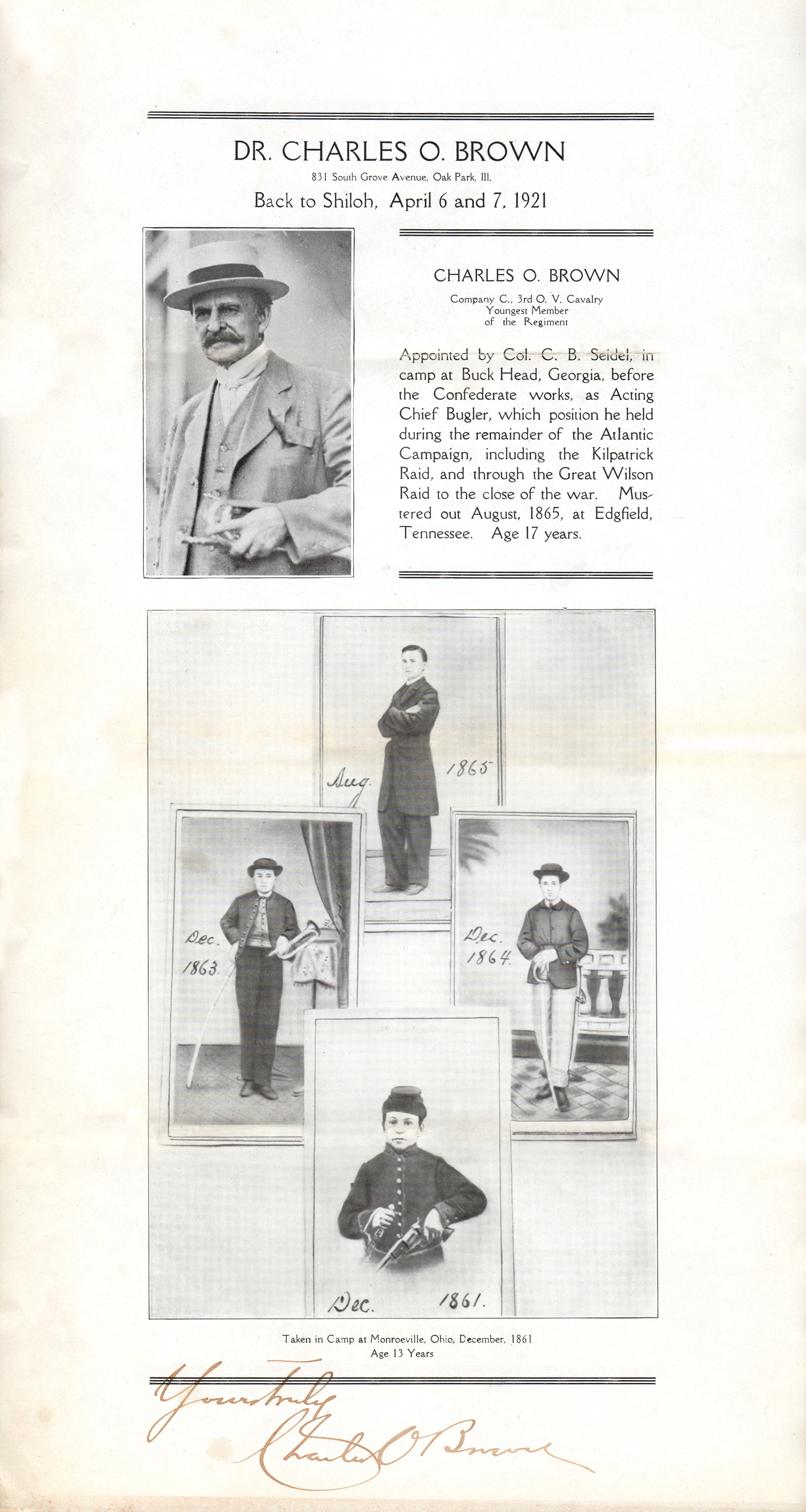
Flyer handed out during the 50th Anniversary of the Battle of Shiloh. Includes signature by Charles Oliver Brown

After the outbreak of the American Civil War in 1861, Brown's father, Major Oliver M. Brown, was involved in organizing Company C of the 3rd Ohio Cavalry. Charles Oliver Brown went off to war with his father as a bugler at the age of 13 and saw action in 25 battles. He was wounded in action and earned the nickname, "The Boy Bugler" of Sherman's Army. At age 16 he was made chief of the regiment's 26 buglers, the youngest chief bugler in the Union forces at that time.

Young Brown blew the cavalry charge that sent 3,000 men into battle at the Battle of Lovejoy's Station during Sherman's sweep on the Atlanta campaign. At the Battle of Selma he carried a message through the thick of fire, and for that act of bravery, Congress in later years voted him a pension increase. The young bugler was a member of the historic expedition which captured the Confederate president, Jefferson Davis.

Brown was not officially mustered into the Union Army until February 18, 1864, when he was 16 years of age. His father signed a "Consent in Case of Minor" affidavit. Young Brown was mustered in as a musician, given an advance pay of $13, and paid a bounty of $60 ($240 remaining balance). Proof of Brown's service at the start of the war can be found in two references. The first is a Carte de visite of him, in uniform, carrying a pistol. The second is this quote from the history of the 3rd Ohio Cavalry, "One other of the boys that were with us when we left Monroeville was the son of Lieutenant Brown of Company C. He went with the regiment as his father's servant-he was then thirteen years old. Charley learned to blow the bugle, and when the regiment was veteranized he was enlisted as a bugler, and in August, 1864, was appointed regimental bugler by Colonel Seidel and served in that capacity until the close of the war."

== Brown becomes a minister ==
Brown enrolled in Olivet College in 1871. In his Junior year he was listed as an Instructor in Penmanship and Book-keeping. In his Senior year he was listed as an Instructor in Greek and Teacher of Penmanship and Book-keeping. He graduated with a Bachelor of Arts degree in June 1875.

At the time of General Sherman's speech at the Michigan Military Academy, Brown was the pastor of the Congregational church of Rochester, MI. "The Rev. Mr. Charles O. Brown accepted the call made by the church and began his ministry on September 3, 1876 at a salary of $900.00 per year and house rent." From 1880 to 1885 he served at the Congregational Church of Galesburg, Michigan, taught at Olivet College in Olivet, Michigan, and served as pastor of the First Congregational Church of Kalamazoo, Michigan.

== "If nominated, I will not run" ==
"A lifelong Republican, Dr. Brown came very nearly being elected United States senator from Iowa during his stay in Dubuque. In those days the state legislature elected the senators. Friends asked him to run for the post. 'I have a job now for which some people think I'm well fitted,' he replied, and made no effort to gain election. Despite his indifference he was nominated and lost the election by only three votes.

"From Dubuque Dr. Brown went to Tacoma, Wash., to assume a pastorate, and subsequently received a call to San Francisco, to become pastor of the largest Congregational church on the Pacific coast. He accepted the call and tendered his resignation to the Tacoma church. Meantime his friends in Tacoma had been preparing for his nomination by the Republican state convention as a candidate for governor of the state. Although informed that his nomination and election were virtually assured, he refused to withdraw his resignation from the Tacoma church, and went to San Francisco." So Brown can be linked to General William Tecumseh Sherman by another of the General's famous quotes: "If nominated, I will not run. If elected, I will not serve."

== Church's moral and spiritual collapse ==
While pastor of the San Francisco church, Brown's character came under scrutiny and was the victim of an attempted blackmail scheme with a female member of the congregation. "Up to the closing days of 1895, to all outward appearances Dr. Brown's ministry had run along on a sound spiritual basis, notwithstanding at times he lacked poise in dealing with current church problems and personalities, and did not have the Victorian polish which many in the constituency prized so highly.

"But at this juncture his relations with a woman parishioner were called in question by a hostile witness in a police court case in which he appeared as prosecuting witness, and became a front-page newspaper sensation. He denied everything, and resented all inquiry. Sharp and acrimonious differences of opinion rocked the church. At the end of April 1896, the tension became so great he resigned. The faction of church officers who supported him having come into control as others stepped to one side, led by Isaac H. Morse, closed the church, transferred his ministrations to a hall, and planned the sale of the church, expecting, when the trouble blew over, to build elsewhere. Their plans running into difficulties, he went East on vacation, and while there accepted a call to Chicago."

Apparently Brown was vindicated of the charges. "Rev. Mr. Brown, of San Francisco, who came within a point of becoming the ruined victim of a trio of female blackmailers, has come through his trials all right. The Overman girl who personated as the victim of Mr. Brown, broke down and made a full confession of the plan to blackmail the minister, the part each was to play, and the amount they had determined upon as hush money. The scamps came very near catching the pastor in the toils."

== History of the 3rd Ohio Cavalry ==
Brown served on a committee which authored and published The History of The Third Ohio Cavalry (3rd Ohio Cavalry). The book is an excellent accounting of a typical Civil War cavalry regiment. The text includes several poems written by members of the Regiment. The following lines are included in Brown's poem, My Bugle:

Reveille in early morning,

Say at four o'clock or three, That was not the same exactly, For you comrades, or for me.

Oft' I saw you coatless, hatless, Sometimes pantless tumble out, When the orderly was shouting, "Roust about, men; roust about!"

And the bugler, like an umpire Of a modern baseball game, Sometimes had to dodge the missiles,

And keep sounding just the same.

— History of the 3rd Ohio Cavalry, p. 214.

== "War is Hell" Controversy ==
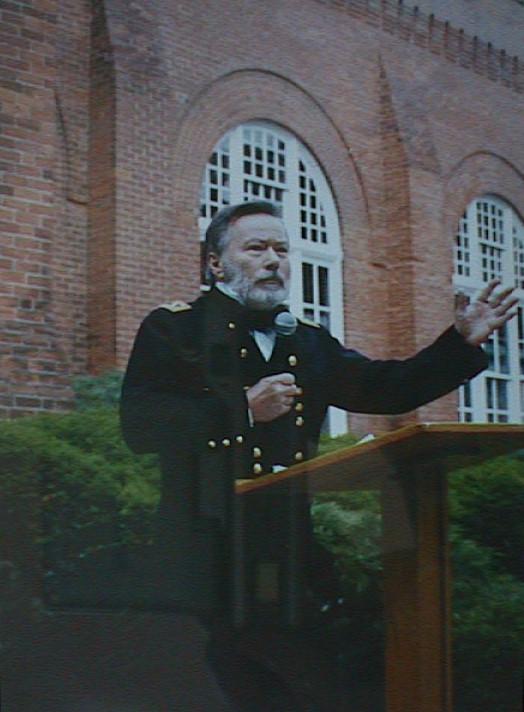
Chris Evans reenacting General William Tecumseh Sherman's speech on the former grounds of the Michigan Military Academy (MMA)

Brown figured in the controversy during the early 1930s as to whether General William Tecumseh Sherman actually made the remark, "War is Hell." Most authors have first attributed Sherman's statement, "War is Hell" to his presentation at the Ohio State Fair in 1880. The following account was published in the History of Oakland County regarding Sherman's address to the cadets of the Michigan Military Academy. Brown was very clear that he heard the remark at the Michigan Military Academy, Orchard Lake, on June 19, 1879. General Sherman was one of the most popular personalities at the time and his presence attracted between 7,000 - 10,000 spectators. In support of Brown's memory, the Oak Park, Illinois periodical, Oak Leaves noted in 1940, "When Oak Leaves editors are in need of accurate information about obscure bits of history or literature, Dr. Brown can be depended upon to throw light on the subject when other sources fail."

Eyewitness, Charles O. Brown, said that, 'the reason the reporters missed the famous statement, and later denied that it had been made, was that the reporters rushed away as soon as Sherman started reading his long, technical speech. But before he sat down, the General suddenly said, 'Cadets of the graduating class' – the students arose and saluted – and then changed it to 'Boys,' making this statement: 'I've been where you are now and I know just how you feel. It's entirely natural that there should beat in the breast of every one of you a hope and desire that some day you can use the skill you have acquired here.

'Suppress it! You don't know the horrible aspects of war. I've been through two wars and I know. I've seen cities and homes in ashes. I've seen thousands of men lying on the ground, their dead faces looking up at the skies. I tell you, war is hell!' The reporters had missed the biggest story of the day. Brown, seated alongside Sherman, wrote down the speech verbatim.".

In preparation for the publishing of The Yale Book of Quotations, Editor Fred R. Shapiro spent time researching the source of "War is Hell." His research suggests that the phrase can be traced back to Napoleon Bonaparte.

== Author ==
At one time he was vice president of La Salle Extension University, which he helped organize. Brown was one of the first speakers engaged by the Chautauqua, part of the time with Bishop John Heyl Vincent, founder of that movement. "He could be on the road from one year's end to the other filling engagements, so popular is he as a publicist." He is the author of two books, one on the "Evidences of Christianity" first delivered in short talks to audiences of his young people. The second is on "Labor and Its Troubles".

== Gone With the Wind ==
Following the end of the American Civil War, Brown became very active in the Grand Army of the Republic and frequently attended veteran's reunions. Brown and his wife May attended the 75th anniversary of the Battle of Gettysburg where President Franklin Roosevelt dedicated the Peace Memorial. In 1940, one year before he died, Brown was one of a squad of Civil War veterans invited to the Chicago showing of the movie, Gone with the Wind. Very few Civil War veterans fought in the war and lived to see the movie.
