= Social Creed (Methodist) =

The Social Creed originated to express Methodism's outrage over the miserable lives of the millions of workers in factories, mines, mills, tenements and company towns. It was adopted by the Methodist Episcopal Church, the first denomination in Christendom to adopt an official Social Creed. As a part of United Methodist social principles, United Methodist congregations are encouraged to regularly reflect upon the creed and use it in worship services.

== History ==
Influenced by the Social Gospel movement and the Progressive politics of early-20th-century America, the Church wrote and adopted the creed in 1908. Its primary authors were Harry F. Ward, Elbert R. Zaring, Frank Mason North, Herbert Welch, and Worth M. Tippy. It has been altered through the years, and still appears in The Book of Discipline of the United Methodist Church, following the Social Principles section.

== Social Creed ==
We believe in God, Creator of the world; and in Jesus Christ, the Redeemer of creation. We believe in the Holy Spirit, through whom we acknowledge God’s gifts, and we repent of our sin in misusing these gifts to idolatrous ends.

We affirm the natural world as God's handiwork and dedicate ourselves to its preservation, enhancement, and faithful use by humankind.

We joyfully receive for ourselves and others the blessings of community, sexuality, marriage, and the family.

We commit ourselves to the rights of men, women, children, youth, young adults, the aging, and people with disabilities; to improvement of the quality of life; and to the rights and dignity of all persons.

We believe in the right and duty of persons to work for the glory of God and the good of themselves and others and in the protection of their welfare in so doing; in the rights to property as a trust from God, collective bargaining, and responsible consumption; and in the elimination of economic and social distress.

We dedicate ourselves to peace throughout the world, to the rule of justice and law among nations, and to individual freedom for all people of the world.

We believe in the present and final triumph of God’s Word in human affairs and gladly accept our commission to manifest the life of the gospel in the world. Amen.

The 2016 Social Creed as it appears in the Book of Discipline.

== 1908 Methodist Social Creed ==
The Methodist Episcopal Church states:

For equal rights and complete justice for all men in all stations of life.

For the principles of conciliation and arbitration in industrial dissensions.

For the protection of the worker from dangerous machinery, occupational diseases, injuries and mortality.

For the abolition of child labor.

For such regulation of the conditions of labor for women as shall safeguard the physical and moral health of the community.

For the suppression of the "sweating system."

For the gradual and reasonable reduction of the hours of labor to the lowest practical point, with work for all; and for that degree of leisure for all which is the condition of the highest human life.

For a release for [from] employment one day in seven.

For a living wage in every industry.

For the highest wage that each industry can afford, and for the most equitable division of the products of industry that can ultimately be devised.

For the recognition of the Golden Rule and the mind of Christ as the supreme law of society and the sure remedy for all social ills.

When the Federal Council of Churches adopted the social creed in December 1908, they added the following phrase at the end:

To the toilers of America and to those who by organized effort are seeking to lift the crushing burdens of the poor, and to reduce the hardships and uphold the dignity of labor, this Council sends the greeting of human brotherhood and the pledge of sympathy and of help in a cause which belongs to all who follow Christ.

== See also ==
- Catholic social teaching
- Evangelical left
- General Board of Church and Society
- Sermon on the Mount
- Social Gospel
- Social justice
- The Upper Room (United Methodist Church)
