= Labor Forward =

The Labor Forward movement was an organizing program of the American Federation of Labor from roughly 1910 to 1920. The program, which took place in approximately 150 cities across the United States, was designed to convince workers of the labor movement's commitment to Christian ideals and labor–management cooperation.

Although initial reports were that the program had generated large crowds and warm responses from employers, large numbers of new trade union members never appeared and the program was shut down.

In some respects, the program is similar to the "Labor in the Pulpits/on the Bimah/in the Minbar" program co-sponsored by the AFL–CIO and Interfaith Worker Justice in the 2000s.
