= Samuel Zane Batten =

- Born: August 10, 1859
- Died: June 5, 1925 (aged 65)
- Education: Bucknell University
- Occupations: Minister and educator

Samuel Zane Batten (August 10, 1859 – June 5, 1925) was an American Baptist minister and educator.

== Biography ==
Batten graduated from Bucknell University in 1885, and served as a Baptist minister in Morristown, New Jersey, where he preached against alcohol consumption and gambling. He was an adamant proponent of democracy for its Christian appeal. In 1908, he established the Commission on Social Service of the American Baptist Association. In 1913, he joined the faculty of what would become the University of Pennsylvania School of Social Policy and Practice.

He was a member of the Brotherhood of the Kingdom.

== Bibliography ==
- The New Citizenship: Christian Character in its Biblical Ideas, Sources, and Relations (1898)
- The Social Task of Christianity: A Summons to the New Crusade (1909)
- The Christian State: The State, Democracy, and Christianity (1909)
- A Working Temperance Program (1910)
- The Industrial Menace to the Home (1914)
- The Moral Meaning of War: A Prophetic Interpretation (1918)
- The New World Order (1919)
- If America Fail: Our National Mission and Our Possible Future (1922)
- Building a Community (1922)
- Why Not Try Christianity? (1923)
