= Washington Gladden =

American pastor and politician (1836-1918)

The Reverend Washington Gladden
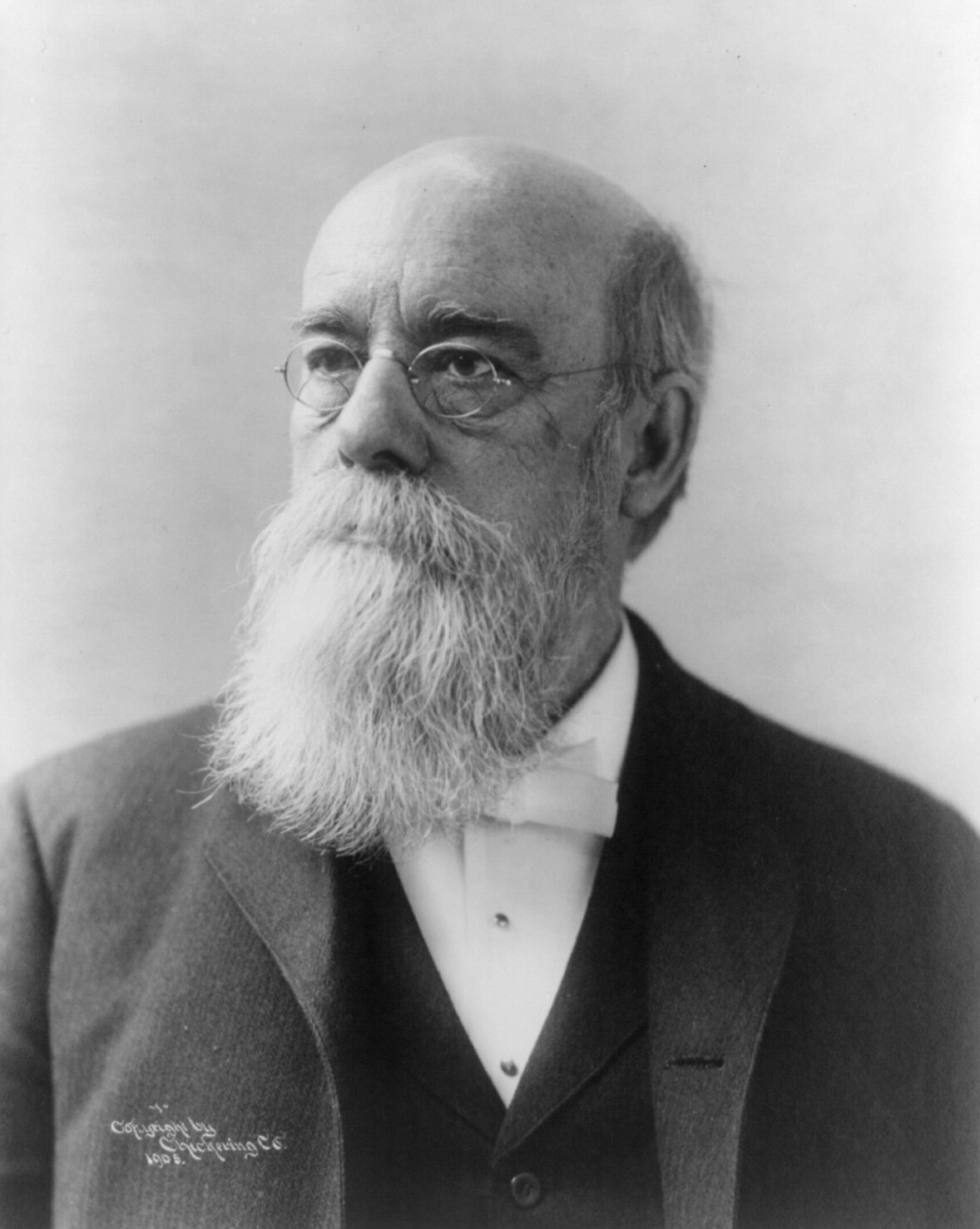
- Portrait of Gladden
- Born: February 11, 1836; Pottsgrove, Pennsylvania, U.S.
- Died: July 2, 1918 (aged 82)
- Resting place: Green Lawn Cemetery; Columbus, Ohio, U.S.
- Occupations: Pastor; politician; editor; writer
- Spouse: Jennie O. Cohoon (m. 1860; died 1909)
- Children: 4

Washington Gladden (February 11, 1836 – July 2, 1918) was a leading American Congregational pastor and early leader in the Social Gospel movement. He was a leading member of the Progressive Movement, serving for two years as a member of the Columbus, Ohio city council and campaigning against Boss Tweed as religious editor of the New York Independent. Gladden was probably the first leading U.S. religious figure to support unionization of the workforce; he also opposed racial segregation. He was a prolific writer who wrote hundreds of poems, hymns, articles, editorials, and books.

== Early life ==
Gladden was born February 11, 1836, in Pottsgrove, Pennsylvania, the son of Solomon and Amanda (Daniels) Gladden. He was given the name Solomon Washington Gladden. When Gladden was six, his father died. After that, he lived with his uncle on a farm near Owego, New York. There, he learned and practiced a farmer's "manual arts" and used any free time for serious reading that included the Bible.

During Gladden's formative years, western New York State was known as the Burned-Over District because it had been the center of a number of religious revivals. Gladden heard many preachers in a fruitless search for "assurance of divine favor" until, in his 18th year, a "clear-headed minister" helped him "trust the Heavenly Father's love" for him. From then on, Gladden believed that religion is "summed up in the word Friendship... with the Father above and the brother by our side."

At 16, Gladden left his uncle's farm to become an apprentice at the Owego Gazette. Two years later (1854) at age 18, he became part of the temperance movement by joining the order of the Good Templars.

During his newspaper apprenticeship, Gladden made his "choice of a calling:" to become an ordained minister in the Congregational Church. Since the calling required further study, he enrolled in the Owego Free Academy and later enrolled in and graduated from Williams College in the class of 1859.

At Williams, Gladden wrote its alma mater song, "The Mountains."

== Early career ==
During his early career, Gladden held five positions in pastorates and journalism.

In 1860, a pivotal year for Gladden, he received his first call to a pastorate, which was followed by ordination, marriage, the secession of southern states, and the impending Civil War.

His first call was to State Street Congregational Church in Brooklyn, New York. He began his pastorate in June 1860 and was ordained in November.

On December 5, 1860, Gladden and Jennie O. Cohoon, a schoolmate at the Owego Free Academy, were married. The couple had two daughters, two sons, and one granddaughter.

Those events in Gladden's life came during what he recalled as "ominous and exciting events" in the nation's life. South Carolina seceded from the Union and was followed within two months by six other states.

In June 1861, he resigned and accepted a call to the Congregational Church at Morrisania, New York, where he served until 1866. In 1863, he took leave to serve in the Christian Chaplaincy Corps. However, he contracted malaria, which forced him to return home for recovery and to resume his pastoral duties.

Gladden's third pastorate was in North Adams, Massachusetts, where he served from 1866 to 1871.

His next position was the religious editor of the New York Independent from 1871 and 1875. The weekly newspaper had a nationwide circulation of one million. His role was to write news articles and editorials on practical theology and the day's social issues. From that position, Gladden attained national fame, especially for his aid in exposing the corrupt organization of Boss Tweed.

In 1875, Gladden became pastor of the North Congregational Church in Springfield, Massachusetts, for seven years. During that pastorate, he also worked as editor of Sunday Afternoon (1878–1880). Sunday Afternoon described itself as "A Monthly Magazine for the Household." Besides editing, he also contributed articles.

Gladden's active support for workers and their right to organize began during his years in North Adams and Springfield. His position aroused the opposition of mill and factory owners, but he was not deterred and continued his work for justice the rest of his life. Although he was deeply concerned for the well-being of workers, scholars have noted that his early lectures in 1875 and 1876 lacked the understanding of the industrial system that was characteristic of his later writings. In that era, Gladden acknowledged that the economic problems were also moral but "contributed little that the most conservative of industrial leaders would not have admitted to be the case."

He published Working People and their Employers in 1876, which advocated the unionization of employees, and was the first notable US clergyman to approve of unions. Gladden did not support socialism or laissez-faire but advocated instead the application of "Christian law" to issues.

His 1877 book The Christian Way: Whither it Leads and How to Go On was his first national call for "the extension of Christian values into everyday life" and began his leadership in the Social Gospel movement.

== At Columbus ==
Gladden became the pastor of the First Congregational Church in Columbus, Ohio, in 1882 and served in that position for thirty-six years. During that time, he furthered his national reputation as a religious leader and as a community leader by his preaching, lecturing, writing, and active involvement. Its congregation included legislators and other persons with the power to address the social injustices about which Gladden preached.

He preached two 45-minute sermons each Sunday. In the morning, he preached on living the Christian life. In the evening, he preached on social problems. The evening sermon was printed in The Ohio State Journal the next day on page one. During First Church's 1902 Golden Jubilee Celebration, Gladden said on his preaching that "you have not always agreed with me; you could not; but when my words, and sometimes my conduct were opposed to your thoughts and interests, you never tried to muzzle me."

By the mid-1880s, he drew audiences across the nation to hear him speak for "bargaining rights for labor, a shorter work week, factory inspections, inheritance taxation, and regulation of natural monopolies." His goal was for "a gradual evolution toward a cooperative social order."

Theologically, Gladden is classified an "evangelical liberal." As such, he was biblically grounded and centered, but always seeking to "adjust Christianity to modern times" He helped to promote his evangelical liberalism in books such as Burning Questions (1890) and Who Wrote the Bible (1891). In Who Wrote the Bible, Gladden stated: "it is idle to try to force the narrative of Genesis into an exact correspondence with geological science."

In 1885, he took part in forming the American Economic Association and served on its council. The stated purpose of the association was "to support independent economic inquiry and to disseminate economic knowledge."

In 1886, he traveled to Cleveland during a streetcar strike, spoke at a public meeting on "Is it Peace or War," and supported the rights of the workers to form a union to protect their interests. He also advocated public ownership of streetcars and public utilities.

The more Gladden addressed social issues, the more his church grew: from 500 in 1883 to 1,200 in 1914. When members disagreed with him, rather than trying to bring them to agree with him, he sought to find common ground on which they could they stand together.

In 1893, former US President Rutherford B. Hayes presented Gladden for the position of president of Ohio State University, but the board rejected him as "too pro-Catholic" because of his opposition to the anti-Catholic American Protective Association. However, the University of Notre Dame awarded Gladden an honorary doctorate for his stance.

Gladden made several lecture tours to Great Britain. During the one in 1898, he defended the United States for entering the Spanish–American War as "humane."

He exerted an international influence as the "father" of the Social Gospel movement. His concern about social issues was grounded on his liberal theology that viewed the Church's mission as applying Christian values to secular institutions.

Gladden served a term on the Columbus City Council between 1900 and 1902 and became an advocate of municipal ownership of public works. He also led a movement to change the elections in Ohio from October to November.

He was one of his nation's "most progressive leaders" in efforts to resolve what he called "The Negro Problem," both economically and politically. He was Vice President of the American Missionary Association between 1894 and 1901 and served as its president between 1901 and 1904. In that capacity, he traveled to Atlanta, Georgia to visit Atlanta University and meet W. E. B. Du Bois. He was shocked at the condition of Southern blacks and started speaking out against racism. Gladden's famous 1903 sermon "Murder as an Epidemic" condemned lynching.

He resigned as President of the American Missionary Association to take up a position as the Moderator of the National Council of the Congregational Churches of the United States in 1904.

In 1905, he made national news by denouncing a $100,000 gift to the Congregationalists from John D. Rockefeller as "tainted."

== Later life ==
In 1914, Gladden retired and became "minister emeritus" of the First Congregational Church. He remained active in other ways until he died of a stroke on July 2, 1918. He was buried at Green Lawn Cemetery in Columbus. The New York Times carried the news that "Gladden, nationally known Congregational minister" had died.

Gladden was predeceased by Jennie, his wife of 49 years, who died May 8, 1909. The last four years of her life she suffered arteriosclerosis that brought her to a state of bed-ridden dementia. Never in the limelight, Jennie was "quietly supportive of her husband's very public career."

The Gladdens had two daughters (one of whom died at 24) and two sons. Alcohol and personal problems beset the sons and they both died young. The difficulties with the Gladdens' sons occurred within a larger similar context. Post-Civil War America was marked by "inward trouble in middle-class family life." Youth felt "great uncertainty" about their identity and their life's work. This made it difficult for them to "settle on careers." Large numbers suffered "nervous collapses."

Historians assessing Gladden's career emphasize the importance of his role in the Social Gospel movement. He became the social gospel's "most revered and respected spokesman" Gladden not only promoted a "Social Gospel of practical action" by his writing and speaking, he engaged in practical action by working for solutions. He supported workers' right to unionize, and he opposed racial segregation.

These assessments by historians correlate with the goal Gladden held up for his ministry. In his 1909 autobiography Recollections, he wrote that, as a minister, he wanted to practice "a religion that laid hold upon life, and proposed first and foremost, to realize the Kingdom of God in this world."

== Honors ==
Gladden never earned a theological degree, but he received 35 honorary doctorates.

== Bibliography ==
Gladden wrote hundreds of poems, hymns, articles, editorials, and books. Gladden's hymn O Master, Let Me Walk With Thee has been published in 470 hymnals. His books follow:

- Plain Thoughts on the Art of Living, 1868
- From the Hub to the Hudson, 1869
- Being a Christian and How to Begin, 1876
- Working People and their Employers, 1876
- The Christian Way: Whither it Leads and how to Go On, 1877
- The Lord's Prayer: Seven Homilies, 1880
- The Christian League of Connecticut, 1883
- Things New and Old: Discourses in Christian Truth and Life, 1884
- The Young Men and the Churches: Why Some of Them are Outside and Why They should Come In, 1885
- Applied Christianity: Moral Aspects of Social Questions, 1887
- Parish Problems: Hints and Helps for the People of the Churches, 1887
- Burning Questions of the Life That Now Is and of That Which Is to Come, 1891
- Who Wrote the Bible?: A Book for the People, 1891
- The Cosmopolis City Club, 1893
- Santa Claus on a Lark: and Other Christmas Stories, 1894
- Tools and the Man: Property and Industry Under the Christian Law, 1894
- The Church and The Kingdom, 1894
- Ruling Ideas of the Present Age, 1895
- Seven Puzzling Bible Books: a Supplement to Who Wrote the Bible, 1897
- The Relations of Art and Morality, 1897
- Social Facts and Forces (Factory, Labor Union, Corporation, Railway, City, Church), 1897
- Our Nation and Her Neighbors, 1898
- The Christian Pastor and the Working Church, 1898
- How Much is Left of the Old Doctrines?, 1899
- Who Wrote the Bible?, 1900
- Social Salvation, 1902
- Organized labor and capital; the William L. Bull lectures for the year 1904, with Talcott Williams, George Hodges, and Francis Greenwood Peabody
- Christianity & Socialism, 1905
- The Church and Modern Life, 1908
- Recollections, 1909
- The Labor Question, 1911
- Present Day Theology, 1913
- Commencement Day: A Book for Graduates 1916
- The Forks of the Road, 1917
- Calendar Verses, 1918, Published by McClelland Co., Columbus, Ohio
- The Interpreter, 1918

== Footnotes ==
=== Further reading ===
- Boyer, Paul. "An Ohio Leader of the Social Gospel Movement: Reassessing Washington Gladden," Ohio History Volume 116#1, 2009 pp. 88–100 in Project MUSE
- Dorn, Jacob H. "The Social Gospel and Socialism: A Comparison of the Thought of Francis Greenwood Peabody, Washington Gladden, and Walter Rauschenbusch," Church History, vol. 62, no. 1 (1993), pp. 82–100.
- Dorn, Jacob. Washington Gladden: Prophet of the Social Gospel. 1968.
- Engs, Ruth C. Progressive Era's Health Reform Movement: A Historic Dictionary. Westport, CT: Praeger, 2003.
- Handy, Robert T. The Social Gospel in America 1870-1920 1966
- Hopkins, Charles H. The Rise of the Social Gospel in American Protestantism 1865-1915 (1940)

=== Primary sources ===
- Washington Gladden, Recollections, 1909
- Washington Gladden, "Tainted Money", 1895, The Outlook Magazine, 30 Nov. 1895
