= Social Gospel =

Social movement

The Social Gospel is a social movement within Protestantism that aims to apply Christian ethics to social problems, especially issues of social justice such as economic inequality, poverty, alcoholism, crime, racial tensions, slums, unclean environment, child labor, lack of unionization, poor schools, and the dangers of war. It was most prominent in the early 20th-century United States and Canada.

Theologically, proponents of the movement emphasized living out the line from the Lord's Prayer (Matthew 6:10): "Thy kingdom come, Thy will be done on earth as it is in heaven", interpreting it as a call to address societal injustices. They typically were postmillennialist and believed the Second Coming could not happen until humankind rid itself of social evils by human effort. (Note: They rejected premillennialist theology, which held the Second Coming of Christ was imminent, and Christians should devote their energies to preparing for it rather than addressing the issue of social evils.) The Social Gospel was more popular among clergy than churches. Its leaders were predominantly associated with the liberal wing of the progressive movement and most were theologically liberal, although a few were also conservative when it came to their views on social issues. Washington Gladden and Walter Rauschenbusch were the two major founders of the movement.

== History ==
The term Social Gospel was first used by Charles Oliver Brown in reference to Henry George's 1879 treatise Progress and Poverty, which sparked the single tax movement.

The Social Gospel affected much of Protestant America. The Presbyterians described their goals in 1910 by proclaiming:

The great ends of the church are the proclamation of the gospel for the salvation of humankind; the shelter, nurture, and spiritual fellowship of the children of God; the maintenance of divine worship; the preservation of truth; the promotion of social righteousness; and the exhibition of the Kingdom of Heaven to the world.

In the late 19th century, many Protestants were disgusted by the poverty level and the low quality of living in the slums. The social gospel movement provided a religious rationale for action to address those concerns. Activists in the Social Gospel movement hoped that, if by public measures as well as enforced schooling, the poor could develop talents and skills, causing the quality of their moral lives to improve. Important concerns of the Social Gospel movement were labor reforms such as abolishing child labor and regulating the hours of work by mothers. By 1920, they were crusading against the 12-hour day for workers at U.S. Steel.

=== Washington Gladden ===
Washington Gladden (1836–1918) was an American Congregational clergyman. His words and actions earned him the title of "a pioneer" of the Social Gospel even before the term came into use. Gladden spoke up for workers and their right to organize unions.

For Gladden, the "Christian law covers every relation of life" including the relationship between employers and their employees. His 1877 book The Christian Way: Whither It Leads and How to Go On was his first national call for such a universal application of Christian values in everyday life. The book began his leadership in the Social Gospel movement. Historians consider Gladden to be one of the Social Gospel movement's "founding fathers".

=== Walter Rauschenbusch (1861–1918) ===
Another of the defining theologians for the Social Gospel movement was Walter Rauschenbusch, a Baptist pastor of the Second German Baptist Church in Hell's Kitchen, New York City.

In 1892, Rauschenbusch and several other leading writers and advocates of the Social Gospel formed a group called the Brotherhood of the Kingdom. Pastors and leaders will join the organization to debate and implement the social gospel.

In 1907, he published the book Christianity and the Social Crisis, which would influence the actions of several actors of the social gospel. His work may be "the finest distillation of social gospel thought." Rauschenbusch railed against what he regarded as the selfishness of capitalism and promoted instead a form of Christian socialism that supported the creation of labor unions and cooperative economics.

==== A Theology for the Social Gospel (1917) ====
The social gospel movement was not a unified and well-focused movement, for it contained members who disagreed with the conclusions of others within the movement. Rauschenbusch stated that the movement needed "a theology to make it effective" and likewise, "theology needs the social gospel to vitalize it." In A Theology for the Social Gospel (1917), Rauschenbusch takes up the task of creating "a systematic theology large enough to match [our social gospel] and vital enough to back it." He believed that the social gospel would be "a permanent addition to our spiritual outlook and that its arrival constitutes a state in the development of the Christian religion", and thus a systematic tool for using it was necessary.

In A Theology for the Social Gospel, Rauschenbusch states that the individualistic gospel has made sinfulness of the individual clear, but it has not shed light on institutionalized sinfulness: "It has not evoked faith in the will and power of God to redeem the permanent institutions of human society from their inherited guilt of oppression and extortion." This ideology would be inherited by liberation theologians and civil rights advocates and leaders such as Martin Luther King Jr.

The "Kingdom of God" is crucial to Rauschenbusch's proposed theology of the social gospel. He states that the ideology and doctrine of "the Kingdom of God," of which Jesus Christ reportedly "always spoke" has been gradually replaced by that of the Church. This was done at first by the early church out of what appeared to be necessity, but Rauschenbusch calls Christians to return to the doctrine of "the Kingdom of God." Of course, such a replacement has cost theology and Christians at large a great deal: the way we view Jesus and the synoptic gospels, the ethical principles of Jesus, and worship rituals have all been affected by this replacement. In promoting a return to the doctrine of the "Kingdom of God", he clarified that the "Kingdom of God": is not subject to the pitfalls of the Church; it can test and correct the Church; is a prophetic, future-focused ideology and a revolutionary, social and political force that understands all creation to be sacred; and it can help save the problematic, sinful social order.

In this book, he explains that Christians must be like the Almighty who became man in Jesus Christ, who was with everyone equally and considered people as a subject of love and service.

=== Settlement movement ===
Many reformers inspired by the movement opened settlement houses, most notably Hull House in Chicago operated by Jane Addams. They helped the poor and immigrants improve their lives. Settlement houses offered services such as daycare, education, and health care to needy people in slum neighborhoods. The YMCA was created originally to help rural youth adjust to the city without losing their religious faith, but by the 1890s became a powerful instrument of the Social Gospel. Nearly all the denominations (including Catholics) engaged in foreign missions, which often had a social gospel component in terms especially of medical uplift. The Black denominations, especially the African Methodist Episcopal church (AME) and the African Methodist Episcopal Zion church (AMEZ), had active programs in support of the Social Gospel. Both evangelical ("pietistic") and liturgical ("high church") elements supported the Social Gospel, although only the pietists were active in promoting Prohibition.

=== Progressives ===
In the United States prior to the First World War, the Social Gospel was the religious wing of the progressive movement which had the aim of combating injustice, suffering and poverty in society. Denver, Colorado, was a center of Social Gospel activism. Thomas Uzzel led the Methodist People's Tabernacle from 1885 to 1910. He established a free dispensary for medical emergencies, an employment bureau for job seekers, a summer camp for children, night schools for extended learning, and English language classes for immigrants. Myron Reed of the First Congregational Church became a spokesman, 1884 to 1894 for labor unions on issues such as worker's compensation. His middle-class congregation encouraged Reed to move on when he became a socialist, and he organized a nondenominational church. The Baptist minister Jim Goodhart set up an employment bureau, and provided food and lodging for tramps and hobos at the mission he ran. He became city chaplain and director of public welfare of Denver in 1918. Besides these Protestants, Reform Jews and Catholics helped build Denver's social welfare system in the early 20th century.

Mark A. Matthews (1867–1940) of Seattle's First Presbyterian Church was a leading city reformer, who investigated red light districts and crime scenes, denouncing corrupt politicians, businessmen, and saloon keepers. With 10,000 members, his was the largest Presbyterian Church in the country, and he was selected the national moderator in 1912. He built a model church, with night schools, unemployment bureaus, kindergarten, an anti-tuberculosis clinic, and the nation's first church-owned radio station. Matthews was the most influential clergymen in the Pacific Northwest, and one of the most active Social Gospelers in America.

The American South had its own version of the Social Gospel, focusing especially on Prohibition. Other reforms included protecting young wage-earning women from the sex trade, outlawing public swearing, boxing, dogfights and similar affronts to their moral sensibilities. The Methodist Episcopal Church, South, took on new responsibilities with the enlargement and professionalization of missionary women's roles starting in 1886 with the Southern Methodist Woman's Parsonage and Home Mission Society. By 1900, says historian Edward Ayers, the white Baptists, although they were the most conservative of all the denominations in the South, became steadily more concerned with social issues, taking stands on "temperance, gambling, illegal corruption, public morality, orphans and the elderly."

=== New Deal ===
During the New Deal of the 1930s, Social Gospel themes could be seen in the work of Harry Hopkins, Will Alexander, and Mary McLeod Bethune, who added a new concern with African Americans. After 1940, the movement lessened, but it was invigorated in the 1950s by black leaders like Baptist minister Martin Luther King Jr. and the civil rights movement. After 1980, it weakened again as a major force inside mainstream churches; indeed, those churches were losing strength.

Examples of the Social Gospel's continued influence can still be found in Jim Wallis's Sojourners organization's Call to Renewal and local organizations such as the Virginia Interfaith Center. Another modern example can be found in the work of John Steinbruck, senior pastor of Luther Place Memorial Church in Washington, DC, from 1970 to 1997, a passionate preacher of the Social Gospel who showed support for the homeless, Central American refugees, and victims of persecution and prejudice.

=== Social Gospel and Labor Movements ===
Because the Social Gospel was primarily concerned with the day-to-day life of laypeople, one of the ways in which it made its message heard was through labor movements. Particularly, the Social Gospel had a profound effect upon the American Federation of Labor (AFL). The AFL began a movement called Labor Forward, which was a pro-Christian group who "preached unionization like a revival." In Philadelphia, this movement was counteracted by bringing revivalist Billy Sunday, himself firmly anti-union, who believed "that the organized shops destroyed individual freedom."

=== Legacy of the Social Gospel ===
The Social Gospel movement peaked in the early 20th century, but scholars debate over when the movement began to decline, with some asserting that the destruction and trauma caused by the First World War left many disillusioned with the Social Gospel's ideals while others argue that the war stimulated the Social Gospelers' reform efforts. Theories regarding the decline of the Social Gospel after the First World War often cite the rise of neo-orthodoxy as a contributing factor in the movement's decline.

While the Social Gospel was short-lived historically, it had a lasting impact on the policies of most of the mainline denominations in the United States. Most began programs for social reform, which led to ecumenical cooperation in 1910 while in the formation of the Federal Council of Churches. Although this cooperation was about social issues that often led to charges of socialism. It is likely that the Social Gospel's strong sense of leadership by the people led to women's suffrage, and that the emphasis it placed on morality led to prohibition. Biographer Randall Woods argues that Social Gospel themes learned from childhood allowed Lyndon B. Johnson to transform social problems into moral problems. This helps explain his longtime commitment to social justice, as exemplified by the Great Society and his commitment to racial equality. The Social Gospel explicitly inspired his foreign-policy approach to a sort of Christian internationalism and nation building.

The Social Gospel Movement has been described as "the most distinctive American contribution to world Christianity."

The Social Gospel, after 1945, influenced the formation of Christian democracy political ideology among Protestants and Catholics in Europe. (Note: John Witte Jr. wrote: Concurrent with this missionary movement in Africa, both Protestant and Catholic political activists helped to restore democracy to war-torn Europe and extend it overseas. Protestant political activism emerged principally in France, the Lowlands, and Scandinavia under the inspiration of both social gospel movements and neo-Calvinism. Catholic political activism emerged principally in Italy, France, and Spain under the inspiration of both Rerum Novarum and its early progeny and of neo-Thomism. Both formed political parties, which now fall under the general egis of the Christian Democratic Party movement. Both Protestant and Catholic parties inveighed against the reductionist extremes and social failures of liberal democracies and social democracies. Liberal democracies, they believed, had sacrificed the community for the individual; social democracies had sacrificed the individual for the community. Both parties returned to a traditional Christian teaching of "social pluralism" or "subsidiarity," which stressed the dependence and participation of the individual in family, church, school, business, and other associations. Both parties stressed the responsibility of the state to respect and protect the "individual in community.") Many of the Social Gospel's ideas also reappeared in the Civil Rights Movement of the 1960s. "Social Gospel" principles continue to inspire newer movements such as Christians Against Poverty.

Reinhold Niebuhr has argued that the 20th century history of Western democracies has not vindicated the optimistic view of human nature which the social gospelers shared with the Enlightenment. Labor historians argue that the movement had little influence on the labor movement, and attribute that failure to professional elitism and a lack of understanding of the collective nature of the movement. Labor did not reject social gospellers because they were unaware of them but, rather, because their tactics and ideas were considered inadequate.

Paul Lubienecki wrote that "contrary to analysis of some historians the historical evidence demonstrated that the [Social Gospel] Movement failed in its campaign to be the leading voice of the worker and to convert the urban immigrant masses". Lubieniecki notes that social gospel appealed predominantly to the white American Protestant middle-class and ultimately related more with the middle class than with the working class. Social gospel ministers did not connect to the struggling ethnic urban poor, and social gospel congregations would often relocate their parish into well-off neighborhoods, abandoning poor districts. This resulted in the Catholic parishes being established in working class areas instead. Lubieniecki also argued that the social gospel movement limited its appeal because of anti-Catholicism and antisemitism - Rauschenbusch stated that social concerns could not be sufficiently addressed by non-Protestants, and regarded Catholicism as inherently anti-democratic and contrary to the American values of individual liberty. Likewise, some social gospel ministers believed that Jews and Catholics threatened the American social order.

== Canada ==
The Cooperative Commonwealth Federation, a political party that was later reformulated as the New Democratic Party, was founded on social gospel principles in the 1930s by J. S. Woodsworth, a Methodist minister, and Alberta MP William Irvine. Woodsworth wrote extensively about the social gospel from experiences gained while working with immigrant slum dwellers in Winnipeg from 1904 to 1913. His writings called for the Kingdom of God "here and now". This political party took power in the province of Saskatchewan in 1944. This group, led by Tommy Douglas, a Baptist minister, introduced universal medicare, family allowance and old age pensions. This political party has since largely lost its religious basis, and became a secular social democratic party. The Social Service Council (SSC) was the "reforming arm of Protestantism in Canada", and promoted idea of the social gospel. Under the "aggressive leadership of Charlotte Whitton", the Canadian Council of Child Welfare, opposed "a widening of social security protection..." and "continued to impede the implementation of provincial mothers' pensions", instead pressing for the "traditional private charity" model. Charlotte Whitton argued that children should be removed from their homes "instead of paying money to needy parents" Charlotte Whitton, as Christie and Gauvreau point out, was also a member of the SSC, The SSC's mandate included the "intensive Christian conquest of Canada".

The Social Gospel was a significant influence in the formation of the People's Church in Brandon, Manitoba, in 1919. Started by Methodist minister A. E. Smith, the People's Church attempted to provide an alternative to the traditional church, which Smith viewed as unconcerned with social issues. In his autobiography All My Life Smith describes his last sermon before starting the People's Church, saying "The Church was afraid it might give offense to the rich and powerful." The People's Church was successful for a time, with People's Churches founded in Vancouver, Victoria, Edmonton, and Calgary. In Winnipeg, Methodist minister and Social Gospeler William Ivens started another workers church, the "Labor Church," in 1918. Both Smith and Ivens tried to take leaves of absence from their Methodist ministries, which were initially granted. Upon a decision to bring all such special cases before the Methodist Stationing Committee, however, the decisions were rescinded.

== In literature ==
The Social Gospel theme is reflected in the novels In His Steps (1896) and The Reformer (1902) by the Congregational minister Charles Sheldon, who coined the motto "What would Jesus do?" In his personal life, Sheldon was committed to Christian socialism and identified strongly with the Social Gospel movement. Walter Rauschenbusch, one of the leading early theologians of the Social Gospel in the United States, indicated that his theology had been inspired by Sheldon's novels.

Members of the Brotherhood of the Kingdom produced many of the written works that defined the theology of the Social Gospel movement and gave it public prominence. These included Walter Rauschenbusch's Christianity and the Social Crisis (1907) and Christianizing the Social Order (1912), as well as Samuel Zane Batten's The New Citizenship (1898) and The Social Task of Christianity (1911).

== 21st century ==
In the United States, the Social Gospel is still influential in liberal Protestantism. Social Gospel elements can also be found in many agencies associated with Protestant denominations and the Catholic Church in the United States.

== See also ==
- Catholic social teaching
- Catholic temperance movement
- Catholic Workers Movement
- Chartism
- Christian humanism
- Christian left
- Christian pacifism
- Christian Social Union (Church of England)
- Christian socialism
- Christian vegetarianism
- Emerging church
- Evangelical left
- The Gospel of Wealth
- George D. Herron
- Kingdom movement
- James W. Fifield Jr.
- Liberation theology
- Methodist Federation for Social Action
- Peace churches
- Prosperity theology
- Quakers
- Salem Bland
- Temperance movement
