= The City (wordless novel) =

Book of woodcut prints by Frans Masereel

- Author: Frans Masereel
- Original title: La Ville: cent bois gravés
- Genre: Wordless novel
- Publication date: 1925
- Publication place: France
- Pages: 100 (recto only)

The City (French: La Ville: cent bois gravés) is a 1925 wordless novel by Flemish artist Frans Masereel. In 100 captionless woodcut prints Masereel looks at many facets of life in a big city.

== Background ==
Frans Masereel (1889–1972) was born in Blankenberge, Belgium. His stepfather's political beliefs left an impression on the young Masereel, who often accompanied him in socialist demonstrations. Masereel left to study art on his own in Paris and volunteered as a translator for the Red Cross in Geneva during World War I. He drew newspaper political cartoons, and copublished a journal in which he published his first woodcut prints. In 1918 he created the book of woodcuts to feature a narrative, 25 Images of a Man's Passion, which he followed with Passionate Journey (1919), The Sun (1919), Story Without Words (1920), and The Idea (1920).

== Content and style ==
Unlike many of Masereel's other books, The City does not follow the unraveling of a plot. Instead, a series of images of life in a big city are on display, showing people from different backgrounds and stages of life: a state funeral, the inside of a poor family's home, a woman's lifeless body dragged out of a canal, prostitutes and entertainers, courtrooms and factories. It opens with a figure seated on a grassy hill staring at the smokestacked cityscape before him and closes with a solitary woman staring from her attic into a star-filled sky.

The visuals bear a strong German Expressionist influence—what critic Lothar Lang describes as "the pictorial vocabulary of Expressionism". Masereel shared with the Expressionists a fondness for the woodcut, though he rejected such labeling of his work. Freed from the needs of plot Masereel was free to focus on individual images to express his vision of the city.

== Publication history and reception ==
The work was made up of 100 woodcut prints sized 5 by 3 1/8 inches (13 cm × 8 cm). It was first published in 1925 by Albert Morencé in Paris, under the French title La Ville: cent bois gravés. In Germany, Kurt Wolff published an edition titled Die Stadt. Later editions include a 1961 edition from Pierre Vorms under a different French title, La Ville: cent gravures sur bois. Dover Publications, Random House, and Schocken Books have published the book under the title of The City.

Critic Perry Willett believed The City "must be considered Masereel's masterpiece woodcut novel", and believed it anticipated the films Berlin: Symphony of a Metropolis (1927) and Man with a Movie Camera (1929), in which the protagonist was the city itself. Masereel continued to publish wordless novels throughout his life, from L'Oeuvre in 1928 to Route des hommes in 1964.
