= 1893 in animation =

Events in 1893 in animation.

== Events ==
- Specific date unknown
  - Émile Reynaud hand-paints 636 individual images for his upcoming animated film. Autour d'une cabine (Around A Cabin). The film was eventually released in 1894, shown at the Musée Grévin from December 1894 until March 1900.
  - Eadweard Muybridge produced a series of 50 different paper 'Zoopraxiscope discs' (basically a version of the phenakistiscopes), with pictures drawn by Erwin F. Faber. The discs were intended for sale at the 1893 World's Columbian Exposition in Chicago. They seem to have sold very poorly, and surviving discs are quite rare. The discs were printed in black-and-white, with twelve different discs also produced as chromolithographed versions. Of the coloured versions, only four different ones are known to still exist (with a total of five or six extant copies).

== Births ==
=== January ===
- January 12: Edward Selzer, American film producer and publicist (Warner Bros. Cartoons), (d. 1970).

=== February ===
- February 10: Jimmy Durante, American actor, comedian, pianist, and singer (voiced himself in Frosty the Snowman), (d. 1980).

=== June ===
- June 24: Roy O. Disney, American businessman (co-founder and first CEO of the Walt Disney Company) and brother of Walt Disney, (d. 1971).

=== August ===
- August 27: Leslie Elton, American animator and comics artist (worked for J.R. Bray), (d. 1966).

=== September ===
- September 12: Wolfgang Zeller, German film composer (composed the orchestral score for the animated film The Adventures of Prince Achmed), (d. 1967).

=== October ===
- October 1: Cliff Friend, American songwriter and pianist (co-wrote "The Merry-Go-Round Broke Down" for Looney Tunes), (d. 1974).

=== November ===
- November 27: Harry Foster Welch, American radio and voice actor (voice of Popeye from 1945 to 1947), (d. 1973).

=== December ===
- December 29: Berthold Bartosch, German-Bohemian filmmaker, pioneer of silhouette animation, creator of an early version of the multiplane camera, (animator for The Adventures of Prince Achmed, director of The Idea), (d. 1968).
