= The Idea (1932 film) =

1932 film

- A woman, representing an idea, confronts a crowd of workers.
- Directed by: Berthold Bartosch
- Written by: Frans Masereel; Berthold Bartosch
- Based on: The Idea by Frans Masereel
- Produced by: Kurt Wolff; Carl Koch; Frans Masereel
- Cinematography: Walter Türck; Franz Planer
- Music by: Arthur Honegger
- Production company: Théâtre du Vieux-Colombier
- Release date: 1932
- Running time: 25 minutes
- Country: France
- Language: Silent

The Idea (French: L'Idée) is a 1932 French animated film by Austro-Hungarian filmmaker Berthold Bartosch (1893–1968), based on the 1920 wordless novel of the same name by Flemish artist Frans Masereel (1889–1972). The protagonist is a naked woman who represents a thinker's idea; as she goes out into the world, the frightened authorities unsuccessfully try to cover up her nudity. A man who stands up for her is executed, and violent suppression by big business greets a workers' revolution she inspires.

Bartosch spent two years animating the film, initially in collaboration with Masereel. Bartosch used complicated techniques with multiple layers of superimposed animation to create the intricately detailed film. The score by Swiss composer Arthur Honegger (1892–1955) features one of the earliest usages of electronic music in film history.

== Synopsis ==
A thinker sits by a window, and an idea comes to him in the form of a doll-sized naked woman. The thinker puts the woman in an envelope and sends her out into the world. She finds herself in an office building, where the frightened authorities attempt to clothe her, but she soon sheds the clothing. She becomes involved with a young working class man, and he appeals to the people on her behalf; he is captured and executed, and his coffin is carried through the streets by the people. Another man presses her into a book, and delivers handbills of her to the frightened people. She is captured by a businessman, and armed soldiers are sent to put down a revolution of the people; the people are suppressed, and the woman, now white-haired, becomes a star and drifts into the cosmos.

== Background ==
Bartosch adapted Masereel's wordless novel The Idea (1920).

Belgian artist Frans Masereel had had success in Europe in the 1920s with his wordless novels made from woodcuts; he pioneered the genre in 1918 25 Images of a Man's Passion. Passionate Journey followed the next year and caught the eye of German publisher Kurt Wolff, whose republication of it topped sales of 100,000 throughout Europe. In late 1929 filmmaker Janine Bouissounouse put Masereel in contact with the Surrealist painter Salvador Dalí, who was interested in including an animated sequence in a proposed film, which was never made.

Berthold Bartosch, born in Austria-Hungary, began his animation career in the Soviet Union and Germany. He participated in such works as Lotte Reiniger's The Adventures of Prince Achmed (1926) before emigrating to France. Wolff encouraged Masereel and Bartosch to collaborate on a film adaptation of one of Masereel's wordless novels. They agreed in 1930 to collaborate on an adaptation of The Idea (1920).

== Production ==
Production took years in a space over the Théâtre du Vieux-Colombier. The film required 45,000 frames of up to four levels of animation each on layers of glass plate, and up to eighteen camera superimpositions. Bartosch combined drawings with hinged cardboard cutout characters. The layered approach exposures took considerable time with Bartosch's limited resources—the room was lit only with a few 100-watt bulbs.

At first the two artists attempted an "animated woodcut" (Note: In Masereel's words: "gravures sur bois animées") approach, but by March 1931 had rejected it in favour of a "more pictorial" (Note: In Masereel's words: "Nous sommes partis maintenant dans une toute autre direction plus pictorial ...") one. Masereel found animation work tedious and backed out partway through; Bartosch finished the production in mid-1932. He combined and synthesized various animation techniques he had learned over his career and developed new ones such as blurring back-lit images with soap. Richard Neupert called Bartosch's methods "a very personal mode of production". Bartosch was handicapped from birth so that he had great difficulty walking; Richard Neupert speculates this may have accustomed the animator to long, solitary hours of work.

== Score ==
Masereel considered Georges Auric for the score, but found the composer's music "soppy" (Note: mièvre) and a poor match for the work. Masereel had long been acquainted with the Swiss composer Arthur Honegger via the avant-garde theatre groupe Art et Action. Honegger had previously composed film scores only twice, for Abel Gance's La Roue (1923) and Napoléon (1927). Masereel convinced him to produce a score for The Idea, which Honegger finished by spring 1934.

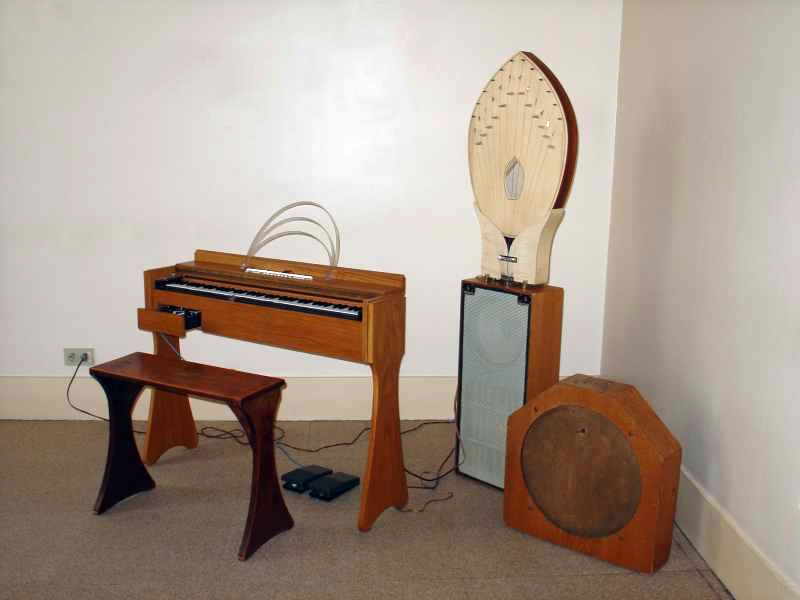
An ondes Martenot, an electronic instrument used in the score; one of the first instances of electronic music used in film

The sound version of the film appeared in 1934. Honegger used an ondes Martenot (Note: The ondes Martenot débuted in 1928.) in one of the first instances of electronic music being used in film. The score is in ten parts:

1. "Générique"
2. "Arbres et idées"
3. "Facteur"
4. "Tribunal"
5. "Usine"
6. "Cortège funèbre"
7. "Savant"
8. "La rotation"
9. "Cortège ouvriers-soldats"
10. "Coda"

== Analysis ==
The film diverges from its source: In the end of Masereel's book, the woman returns to the thinker, while the film ends with the defeat of the woman. The film blends objective and subjective modes—at times realistic, at others characters can seem indistinct and changeable: the protagonist towers over others in one scene while in another is so small she slips into an envelope.

The art style draws heavily from the German Expressionist-inflected artwork of the book and displays such influences as of Russian Constructivism poster art. The eerie atmosphere recalls German Expressionist films such as Lang's Metropolis (1927) Ruttmann's Berlin (1927). The narrative style cuts from scene to scene quickly and employs many superimpositions

== Reception and legacy ==
A private preview of The Idea took place in Paris on 23 January 1932; the Belgian artist Henry van de Velde and the German writers Stefan Zweig and Klaus Mann were amongst the attendees. Mann lauded it as "of the highest ethical and artistic pathos". (Note: In Mann's words: "von höchsten ethischen und artistischen Pathos") The official première—with Honegger's soundtrack—occurred in London in late 1934.

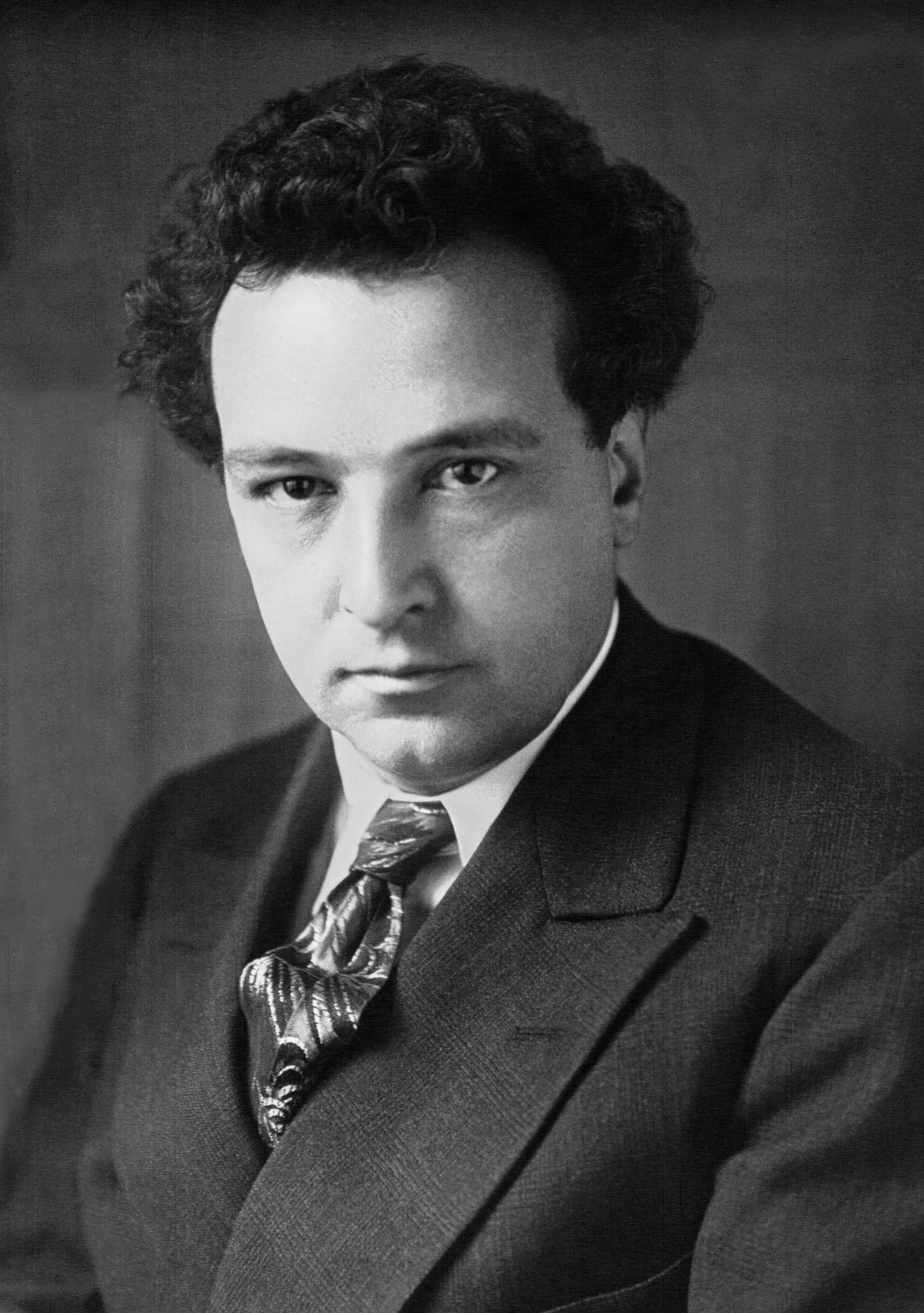
Arthur Honegger went on to have a prolific career scoring films.

The sound version found receptive audiences in Europe, though distribution was limited due to censorship over its socialist themes. Despite objections in the press the Nazis had it suppressed in Germany along with Masereel's other works, and it fell into obscurity. Honegger went on to become a prolific scorer of films, composing for at least forty.

Bartosch made a number of animated advertisement films in the following years. He attempted an animated anti-war film in colour called Saint Francis: Dreams and Nightmares, but abandoned the work when he and his wife fled, as the Nazis descended on Paris. The completed portions disappeared during the Nazi occupation. A negative of The Idea was rediscovered at the Cinémathèque Française in 1959 and Bartosch participated in its reconstruction.

Film historians continue to praise the work. Filmmaker Alexandre Alexeieff praised the film's mix of fantasy and "unrelenting reality" and described Bartosch's methods as "like Renaissance painters layer by layer, thus obtaining incredible fineness of tone". He declared, "It was Bartosch who first dared to give animation the dimensions of great art". Film historian William Moritz called The Idea "the first animation film created as an artwork with serious, even tragic, social and philosophical themes". Animation historian Giannalberto Bendazzi assessed The Idea as "one of the rare films in which political commitment does not conflict with lyricism". Film historian and theorist Rishard Neupert called The Idea "an exotic animated project that combines a wild variety of textures and pacing into a truly unique product with its own rhythm, episodic structure, and frustrating logic". Historian Perry Willett found the film "something of a disappointment" and unclear at times.
