= Animation stand =

Tool used for animation

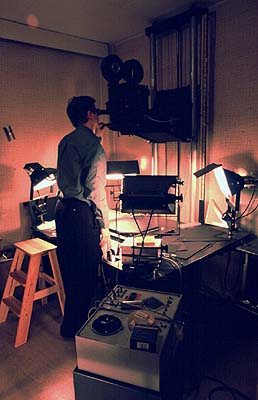
An animation stand with a 35 mm camera.

An animation stand is a device assembled for the filming of any kind of animation that is placed on a flat surface, including cel animation, graphic animation, clay animation, and silhouette animation.

Traditionally, the flat surface that the animation rests on is some kind of table that the animator sits at. Pegs made specifically for animation are embedded into the table, in at least two slots allowing the pegs to slide from side to side, permitting horizontal movement of images, but can also be easily fixed into position for the accurate positioning ("registration") of the artwork.

Opposite the animator is a series of supporting arms and supports, on top of which is mounted a film or video camera, pointing down toward the artwork, which films the artwork, frame-by-frame, as it is slowly moved and changed by the operator.

The vertical positioning of the animation camera, always shooting down, is the main component that defines an animation stand, as opposed to a stop motion set-up, or other equipment arrangements for animation production.

Animation stands can be homemade, from metal or wood, such as that owned by Los Angeles animator Mike Jittlov, and still accomplish impressive animation production; or they can be elaborate (and expensive) professionally made precision systems that allow for the computerised movements of both the art and the camera, as has been traditionally used by professional animation studios and special effects facilities such as the Walt Disney studio (famous for their Multiplane camera) and George Lucas's Industrial Light & Magic (ILM) facilities.

== See also ==
- Animation camera
- Rostrum camera
