= Chasing Fortune =

1930 film

- Directed by: Rochus Gliese
- Written by: Carl Koch; Lotte Reiniger; Alex Strasser; Rochus Gliese
- Starring: Catherine Hessling; Alexander Murski; Amy Wells; Berthold Bartosch
- Cinematography: Fritz Arno Wagner
- Music by: Theo Mackeben
- Production company: Comenius-Film
- Distributed by: Deutscher Werkfilm
- Release date: 27 March 1930
- Running time: 96 minutes
- Country: Germany
- Language: German

Chasing Fortune (German: Die Jagd nach dem Glück, lit. 'The Hunt for Happiness') is a 1930 German drama film directed by Rochus Gliese and starring Catherine Hessling, Alexander Murski and Amy Wells. The film's art direction was by Gliese himself along with Arno Richter. It was initially made as a silent film, but was released with an added synchronised soundtrack. It was filmed at the Grunewald Studios in Berlin and on location around La Ciotat in Southern France. The animator Lotte Reiniger assistant-directed the film, overseeing the shadow puppet segments.

== Cast ==
- Catherine Hessling as Catherine
- Alexander Murski as Marquant
- Amy Wells as Jeanne, Marquants Tochter
- Berthold Bartosch as Mario
- Jean Renoir
- Lionel Royce
- Hilde Körber
- Hans Rehmann

== Bibliography ==
- Grange, William. Cultural Chronicle of the Weimar Republic. Scarecrow Press, 2008.
