= The Clown and His Donkey =

1910 animated short film by Charles Armstrong

The Clown and His Donkey is a 1910 animated short film featuring silhouette animation. It was written, directed, and produced by the British animator Charles Armstrong. It was his third known silhouette animated film, following The Sporting Mice (1909) and Votes for Women: A Caricature (1909). The Clown and His Donkey is Armstrong's only surviving film, though he continued directing animated films until 1915. All of Armstrong's animated films were distributed by the Charles Urban Trading Company.

== Plot ==
The film consists of seven scenes, separated by black segments of various lengths. The film depicts a clown and his donkey performing circus tricks, juggling, and playing practical jokes. A circus monkey assists the clown in some scenes. The clown gestures to the audience, asking for its complicity.

== Production ==
The film's silhouettes are white. They are depicted in profile, and contrasted with the film's black background.

In the film, Armstrong animated shadow puppets frame-by-frame. He was pioneering silhouette animation techniques which would later be perfected by Lotte Reiniger.

Charles Armstrong produced his animated films at the Cumberland Works in Kew. The film's depiction of circus acts reflected the status of animation itself in its era. Animation was seen as a novelty and as a form of marginal entertainment.

Armstrong's animated films tended to combine "impossible" scenarios with political satire, reflecting the British political issues of his era. The Clown and His Donkey may be making a "playful social point", but its primary purpose was to demonstrate Armstrong's "technical acumen".
