= 25 Images of a Man's Passion =

1918 wordless novel by Frans Masereel

The protagonist leads a workers' revolt

25 Images of a Man's Passion, or The Passion of a Man is the first wordless novel by Flemish artist Frans Masereel (1889–1972), first published in 1918 under the French title 25 images de la passion d'un homme. The silent story is about a young working-class man who leads a revolt against his employer. The first of dozens of such works by Masereel, the book is considered to be the first wordless novel, a genre that saw its greatest popularity in Europe in the 1920s and 1930s. Masereel followed the book in 1919 with his best-known work, Passionate Journey.

Masereel had grown up reading revolutionary socialist literature, and expressed his politics in A Man's Passion; the work is also filled with religious imagery, as with the Common Man taking the role of the martyred Christ. It owed its visual style to Expressionism and mediaeval woodcuts. The book was popular, particularly in German editions, which had introductions by writers Max Brod, Hermann Hesse, and Thomas Mann.

== Background ==
Frans Masereel (1889–1972) was born into a French-speaking family in Blankenberge, Belgium. When he was five his father died, and his mother remarried to a doctor in Ghent, whose political beliefs left an impression on the young Masereel. Masereel grew up reading Marxist, socialist, and anarchist works by such writers as Karl Marx and Peter Kropotkin, and often accompanied his stepfather in socialist demonstrations. After a year at the Ghent Academy of Fine Arts in 1907, Masereel left to study art on his own in Paris. During World War I he volunteered as a translator for the Red Cross in Geneva, drew newspaper political cartoons, and copublished a magazine called Les Tablettes, in which he published his first woodcut prints.

In the early 20th century there was a revival in interest in mediaeval woodcuts, particularly in religious books such as the Biblia pauperum. The woodcut is a less refined medium than the wood engraving that replaced it—artists of the time took to the rougher woodcut to express angst and frustration. From 1917 Masereel began publishing books of woodcut prints, using similar imagery to make political statements on the strife of the common people rather than to illustrate the lives of Christ and the saints. In 1918 he created the first such book to feature a narrative, 25 Images of a Man's Passion, which is thus the earliest example of the wordless novel genre.

== Synopsis ==
25 Images of a Man's Passion tells of a young man who protests injustice against the working class in an industrialized society. The man is born to an unwed mother, struggles to make a living, and drinks and whores with his coworkers. He educates himself by reading and talking with his coworkers, and is executed by the authorities for leading a revolt against his employer.

Scenes from 25 Images of a Man's Passion

== Style and analysis ==
The title and content of the book have biblical resonances with the mediaeval woodcuts from which they draw inspiration. In line with Masereel's politics, the Common Man is martyred instead of Christ; during his trial, Christ on the crucifix shines light upon the man. The cover of the German edition depicts the main character burdened Christ-like with a crucifix.

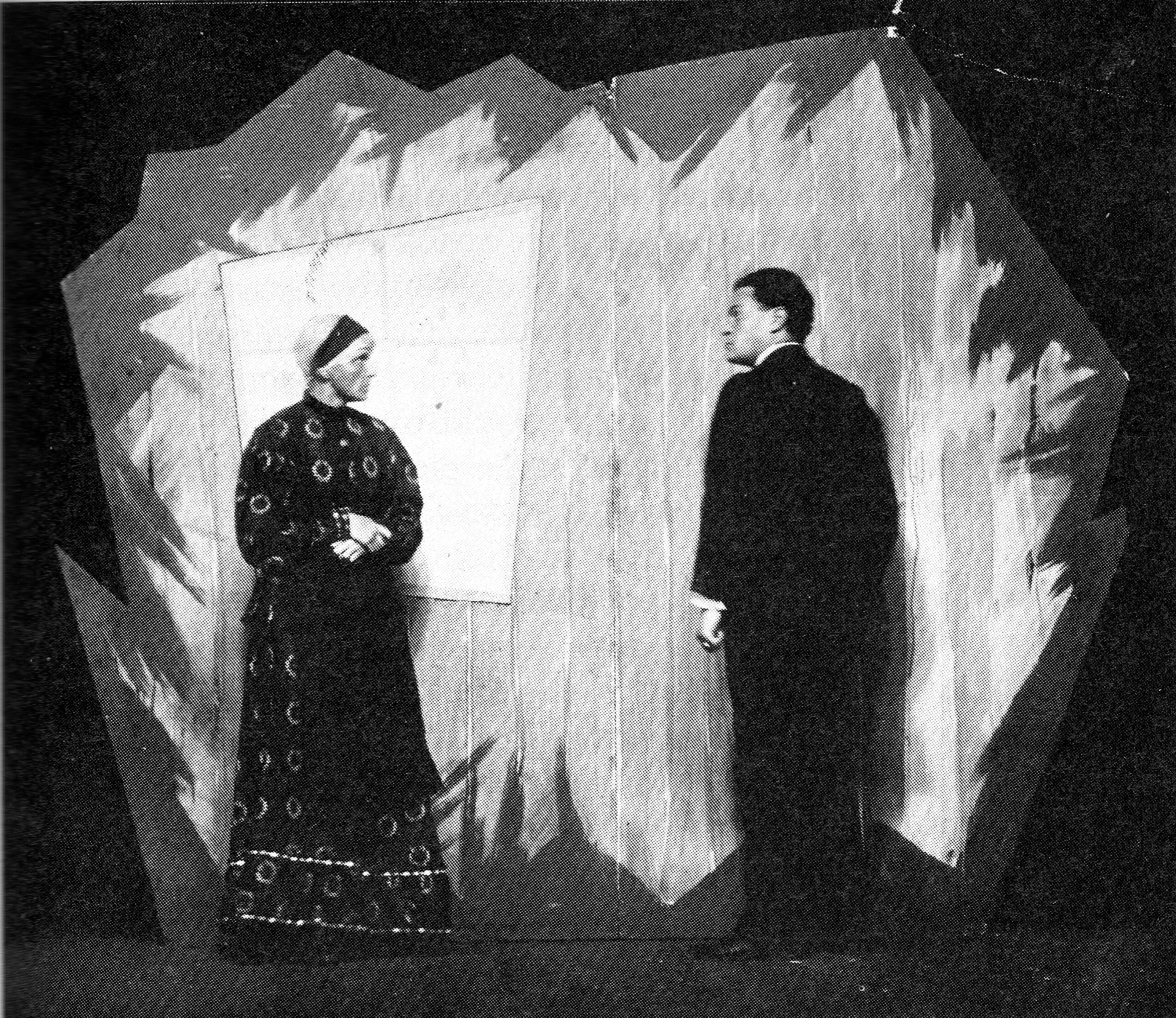
The story parallels that of Ernst Toller's The Transformation. Pictured: a production of The Transformation on 30 September 1919

Visually, the book owes much to Expressionism, though experts disagree on whether to label Masereel's work Expressionist; critic Lothar Lang finds Masereel's revolutionary politics to set Masereel apart from the Expressionists. Perry Willet finds parallels between the story arc of Masereel's book and that of Expressionist playwright Ernst Toller's The Transformation (Note: German: Die Wandlung) (1919), though Masereel's work was the more political—Toller lacked Masereel's commitment to socialism. Socialist themes of the martyrdom of the working class were common in wordless novels; with the city as a backdrop to a worker's struggle against oppression, the book set the tone and themes for future wordless novels by Masereel and other artists, such as the American Lynd Ward.

== Publication and reception ==
Printed from twenty-five woodcut blocks, the book was first released in 1918 by Édition de Sablier, a Swiss publishing house of which Masereel was a co-sponsor. It was first offered as a numbered collectors' edition, and followed by trade editions. Kurt Wolff produced an inexpensive German edition (Die Passion eines Menschen) in 1921. The German edition was particularly popular, and its several editions had introductions by writers Max Brod, Hermann Hesse, and Thomas Mann. In the same Expressionistic style, Masereel followed Man's Passion with Passionate Journey (Note: French: Mon livres d'heures, also known as My Book of Hours) (1919), The Sun (Note: French: Le soleil) (1919), Story Without Words (Note: French: Histoire sans paroles) (1920), and The Idea (Note: French: Idée) (1920).

== See also ==
- Gods' Man
- Graphic novel
