= Ken Morse =

British rostrum camera operator

Ken Morse (born c. 1944) is a British rostrum camera operator who has provided visual effects to BBC television programmes over several decades.

Ken Morse worked as a cinema projectionist from the age of 12 for about 10 years.

Morse joined the film industry in the 1960s, working originally in stop motion animation before moving to the rostrum camera. The British Academy (BAFTA) presented him with a Lifetime Achievement award to recognise his contributions to the industry over nearly forty years. He is based in Shepherd's Bush, London, England.

Morse has been mentioned in several British sketch shows: The Fast Show listed his name in a spoof set of credits; and Big Train included a sketch about a rostrum cameraman driven mad by always being overshadowed by Ken Morse. The one-off comedy special Clinton: His Struggle with Dirt (produced by Armando Iannucci) credited 'Rostrum Camera' to "Not Ken Morse". He was also credited for 'Rostrum Camera' in the spoof credits for The Diary of Anne Frank, a sketch in the first series of Monkey Dust. At one stage the credit "Rostrum Cameraman, Ken Morse," was even used on the spoken credits of the popular satirical BBC Radio show Week Ending.
