= Helen Wolff =

American editor and publisher (1906–1994)

- Born: 27 July 1906; Ottoman Empire
- Died: 28 March 1994 (aged 87); Hanover

Helen Wolff (27 July 1906 – 28 March 1994) was an American editor and publisher.

== Early life and education ==
Helen Mosel was born to a German father and a Hungarian/Austrian mother in Macedonia, then part of the Ottoman Empire, in 1906. The family spoke German, Turkish and Serbian. They spent time living in Üsküb. Wolff attended boarding schools in Vienna and learned English. She discovered her gift for languages.

== Career ==
In 1927, Wolff worked in Munich where she went from trainee to being in charge of art books for Kurt Wolff Press. The Pantheon imprint where she worked was sold to a Parisian company, and Wolff went there as part of the deal. The Nazis closed the publishing house and the family fled to the United States via Italy and France.

They arrived in New York in 1941 almost penniless. They founded Pantheon Books in 1942. In 1959 Wolff moved to Locarno with her husband. The Pantheon line became an imprint of Random House and in 1961 they established the A Helen and Kurt Wolff Book imprint at Harcourt Brace Jovanovich. Wolff had an advantage when selecting books from Europe, she could attend the Frankfurt book fair and read the book in German, French, Italian or Turkish, getting an advantage over other publishers.

Kurt Wolff was killed in a traffic accident on his way to a meeting in 1963. Wolff continued running the imprint until she retired in 1986. The imprint continued after she left. Wolff was awarded the Inter Nationes Award for Literature and the Arts by the West German Government in 1981 as well as the Goethe Medal in 1985. Wolff died in Hanover, New Hampshire in 1994.

They published a number of notable works including Boris Pasternak's Doctor Zhivago, Georges Simenon's novels, Umberto Eco's The Name of the Rose, Italo Calvino's Invisible Cities, and Anne Morrow Lindbergh's Gift From the Sea. Wolff never published any of her own work. She wrote, but believed a publisher shouldn't publish. However, after her death, her novel Hintergrund für Liebe was published in 2020.

== Personal life ==
In 1933, she married Kurt Wolff in London and their son, composer Christian Wolff, was born in 1934 in Nice. Kurt Wolff had two previous children from his first marriage.

== Sources ==
Category:Emigrants from the Ottoman Empire to the United States
