= Frans Masereel =

Belgian artist (1889–1972)

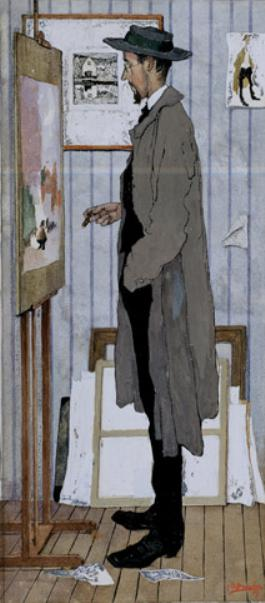
Frans Masereel in his studio, by Jules De Bruycker

Frans Masereel (31 July 1889 – 3 January 1972) was a Belgian painter and graphic artist who worked mainly in France. He is known especially for his woodcuts which focused on political and social issues, such as war and capitalism. He completed over 40 wordless novels in his career, and among these, his greatest is generally said to be Passionate Journey.

Masereel's woodcuts influenced Lynd Ward and later graphic artists such as Clifford Harper, Eric Drooker, and Otto Nückel.

== Biography ==
=== Upbringing ===
Frans Masereel was born in the Belgian coastal town Blankenberge in West Flanders on 31 July 1889, and at the age of five, his father died. His mother moved the family to Ghent in 1896. She met and married a physician with strong Socialist convictions, and the family together regularly protested against the appalling working conditions of the Ghent textile workers.

=== Education ===
At the age of 18 he began to study at the École des Beaux-Arts in the class of Jean Delvin. His culture, first revolutionary and then anti-militarist, was shaped by reading Russian works such as those of Kropotkin, translated by his Aunt Fanny. In 1909, he visited England and Germany, which inspired him to make his first etchings and woodcuts. In 1911 Masereel settled in Paris for four years and then emigrated to Switzerland, where he worked as a graphic artist for journals and magazines.

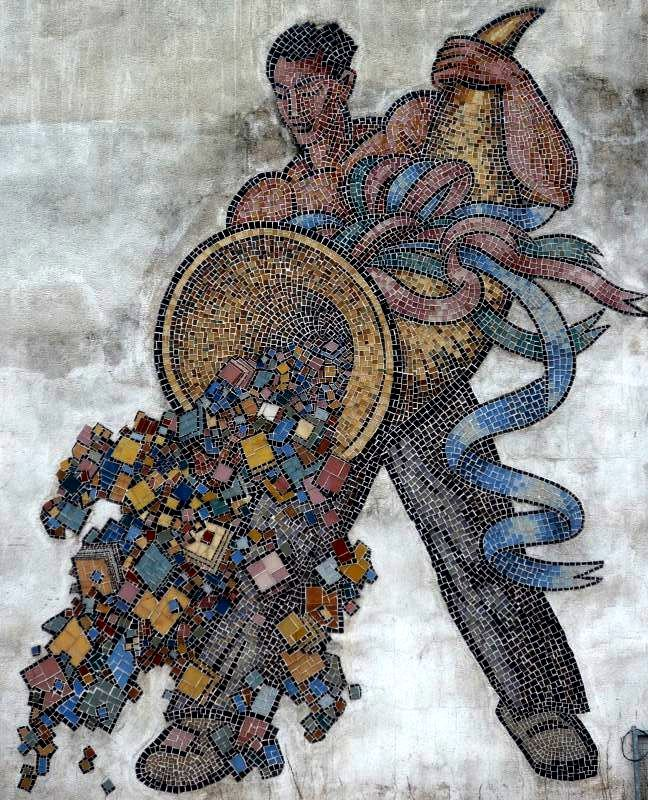
Cornucopia, a mosaic by Frans Masereel

=== Emigre ===
Masereel could not return to Belgium at the end of World War I because, being a pacifist, he had refused to serve in the Belgian army. Nonetheless, when a circle of friends in Antwerp interested in art and literature decided to found the magazine Lumière, Masereel was one of the artists invited to illustrate the text and the column headings. The magazine was first published in Antwerp in August 1919. It was an artistic and literary journal published in French. The magazine's title Lumière was a reference to the French magazine Clarté, which was published in Paris by Henri Barbusse. The principal artists who illustrated the text and the column headings in addition to Masereel himself were Jan Frans Cantré, Jozef Cantré, Henri van Straten, and Joris Minne. Together, they became known as 'De Vijf' or 'Les Cinq' ('The Five'). Lumière was a key force in generating renewed interest in wood engraving in Belgium. The five artists in the 'De Vijf' group were instrumental in popularizing the art of wood, copper and linoleum engraving and introducing Expressionism in early 20th-century Belgium.

In 1921 Masereel returned to Paris, where he painted his famous street scenes, the Montmartre paintings. He lived for a time in Berlin, where his closest creative friend was George Grosz. After 1925 he lived near Boulogne-sur-Mer, where he painted predominantly coast areas, harbour views, and portraits of sailors and fishermen. During the 1930s his output declined. With the Fall of France to the Nazis in 1940 he fled from Paris and lived in several cities in Southern France.

=== Post-World-War II ===
At the end of World War II Masereel was able to resume his artistic work and produced woodcuts and paintings. After 1946 he taught at the Hochschule der Bildenden Künste Saar in Saarbrücken. In 1949 Masereel settled in Nice. Between 1949 and 1968, he published several series of woodcuts that differ from his earlier "novels in picture'" in comprising variations on a subject instead of a narrative. He had also designed decorations and costumes for numerous theatre productions. The artist was honoured in numerous exhibitions and became a member of several academies.

=== Death ===
Frans Masereel died in Avignon in 1972 and was buried in Ghent.

== Legacy ==
=== Influence ===
Masereel's woodcuts influenced Lynd Ward and later graphic artists such as George Walker, Clifford Harper, Eric Drooker, and New Yorker cartoonist Peter Arno.

Masereel's woodcut series, mainly of sociocritical content and expressionistic in form, made Masereel internationally known. Among them were the wordless novels 25 Images of a Man's Passion (1918), Passionate Journey (1919), The Sun (1919), The Idea (1920), Story Without Words (1920), and Landscapes and Voices (1929). At that time Masereel also drew illustrations for famous works of world literature by Thomas Mann, Émile Zola, and Stefan Zweig. He also produced a series of illustrations for the classic Legend of Thyl Ulenspiegel and Lamme Goedzak by his fellow Belgian Charles De Coster; these illustrations followed the book in its translations to numerous languages.

From Mon Livre d'Heures (A Passionate Journey, 1919)

=== Namesakes ===
The cultural organization Masereelfonds was named after him, as was the Frans Masereel Centre studio facility at Kasterlee.

== List of works ==
=== Graphic novels ===
==== Woodcut graphic novels ====
These woodcut series form complete wordless graphic novels with independent visual narratives.

- 25 Images of a Man's Passion / The Passion of a Man (25 Images de la Passion d'un Homme / Die Passion Eines Menschen, 1918)
- Passionate Journey / My Book of Hours (Mon Livre d'Heures / Mein Stundenbuch, 1919) (Archive.org)
- The Sun (Le Soleil / Die Sonne, 1919)
- Political Drawings (Dessins Politiques / Politische Zeichnungen, 1920) (Archive.org)
- Story Without Words (Histoire Sans Paroles / Geschichte ohne Worte, 1920)
- The Idea (L'Idée / Die Idee, 1920)
- The City (La Ville / Die Stadt, 1925) (Archive.org)
- The Industrial Baron (Die Industriebaron, 1925)
- Figures and Grimaces (Figures et Grimaces / Gesichter und Fratzen, 1926)
- The Work (L’œuvre, Das Werk, 1928)
- Landscapes and Voices (Landschaften und Stimmungen, 1929) (Archive.org)
- The Mermaid (La Sirène, 1932)
- From Black to White (Du Noir au Blanc / Von Schwarz zu Weiss, 1939)
- Dance of Death (Danse Macabre, 1941)
- June '40 (Juin 40, 1942)
- Destinies 1939-1940-1941-1942 (Destins 1939-1940-1941-1942, 1943)
- Earth under the sign of Saturn (La Terre sous le signe de Saturne, 1944)
- Remember! (1946)
- Angel (Engel, 1947)
- Phenomena (Erscheinungen, 1947)
- Ages of life (Les Âges de la Vie, 1948)
- Youth (Jeunesse, 1948)
- Ecce Homo (1949)
- Key to Dreams (Clef des songes, 1950)
- Our Times (Notre Temps, 1952)
- The apocalypse of our time (Die Apokalypse unserer Zeit, 1953)
- Why? (Pour quoi?, 1954)
- My book of images (Mon livre d'images, 1956)
- My country (Mon Pais, 1956)
- Night Adventure (Aventure nocturne, 1958)
- Night and his Daughters (La Nuit et ses Filles, 1959)
- China Memories (Erinnerungen an China, 1961)
- Stations (É'talges, 1961)
- From Decay to Triumph (Vom Verfall zum Triumph, 1961)
- Poets (Poètes, 1963)
- The face of Hamburg (Das Gesicht Hamburgs / Le visage de Hambourg, 1964)
- The road of men (Der weg der menschen, Route des hommes, 1964)
- Couples (1965)
- My home (Meine Heimat, 1965)
- Antwerp (Antwerpen, 1968)
- Hands (Mains, 1968)
- Vice and passion (Laster und Leidenschaft, 1968)
- I love black and white (Ik houd van zwart en wit, 1970)
- Pictures against the war (Bilder gegen den Krieg, 1981)
- Woodcuts against the war (Holzschnitte gegen den Krieg, 1989)

==== Brush and ink graphic novels ====
- Grotesque Film (Groteskfilm, 1921) a bibliographic listing)
- Pictures of the Big City (Bilder der Grossstadt / Images de la grande ville, 1926)
- Capital (Capitale, 1935)
- Wrath (La Colère, 1946)

=== Illustrator ===
- The Days of the Curse (Die Tage des Fluches), by Marcel Martinet (1914–1916)
- Hôtel-Dieu, Récits d'Hôpital (Hôtel-Dieu, Hospital Stories) by Pierre Jean Jouve (1915)
- Quinze Poemes (Fifteen Poems) by Émile Verhaeren (1917)
- Pierre und Luce (Pierre and Luce; sometimes translated as Peter and Luce) by Romain Rolland (1918)
- Calamus: Poèmes (Calamus: Poems, a section from Leaves of Grass), by Walt Whitman (1919)
- Die Mutter (The Mother) by Leonhard Frank (1919)
- Heures (Hours) by Pierre Jean Jouve (1919)
- Bübü vom Montparnasse (Bubu of Montparnasse) by Charles-Louis Philippe (1920) (Archive.org)
- Das Gemeinsame (The Common) by René Arcos (1920)
- Les Poètes contre la Guerre (The Poets Against War) by Romain Rolland, Georges Duhamel, Charles Vildrac and Pierre Jean Jouve (1920)
- The Eternal Jew (Der Ewige Jude, 1921) (Archive.org) by August Vermeylen
- Le Travailleur étrange et autres récits (The Strange Worker and Other Stories) by Émile Verhaeren (1921)
- Peter und Lutz (Peter and Lutz) by Romain Rolland (1921) (Archive.org)
- La révolte des machines, ou la Pensée Déchainée (The Revolt of Machines or the Mind Unbound, republished in 1947 as in Dutch as De opstand der machines, of Het losgebroken intellect) by Romain Rolland (1921) (Archive.org)
- Quelque Coins du Coeur by Henri Barbusse (1921)
- The good Madeleine and the poor Marie (Die gute Madeleine und die arme Marie), by Charles-Louis Philippe (1922)
- Fairfax by Carl Sternheim (1922)
- Cygne de Rabindranath Tagore (Swan of Rabindranath Tagore) by Kâlidâs Nâg and Pierre Jean Jouve (1923)
- Fünf Erzählungen (Five Tales) by Émile Verhaeren (1924) (Archive.org)
- Liluli by Romain Rolland (1924)
- Prière (Pray) by Pierre Jean Jouve (1924)
- Jean-Christophe (Johann Christof) by Romain Rolland (1925)
- Thyl Ulenspiegel by Charles de Coster (1926)
- Kerstwake by Stijn Streuvels (1928)
- Swane (Swans) by Emmanuel De Bom (1928)
- Der Zwang. Phantastische Nacht (The Force. Fantastic night) by Stefan Zweig (1929)
- Im Strom der Zeit: Gedichte (In the Stream of Time: Poems) by Ernst Preczang (1929)
- Das Bein der Tiennette und andere Erzählungen (Tiennette's leg and other stories) by Charles-Louis Philippe (1929)
- De man zonder lijf (The Man Without a Body) by Herman Teirlinck (1937)
- Ode a la France Meurtrie (Ode to the Dead France) by Louis Piérard (1940)
- Jugement (Judgment) by Agrippa d'Aubigné (1941)
- La légende d’Ulenspiegel (The Glorious Adventures of Tyl Ulenspiegl) by Charles de Coster (1943)
- Die Nacht (The Night) by Rudolf Hagelstange (1955)
- Vater Perdrix by Charles-Louis Philippe (1960)
- Du bist für alle Zeit geliebt. Gedichte (You're Loved Forever. Poems) by Johannes R. Becher (1960)
- Vom Verfall zum Triumph (From Decline to Triumph) by Johannes R. Becher (1961)
- Moriae Encomium: Or The Praise Of Folly by Desiderius Erasmus (1965)
- Dolle Dinsdag (Crazy Tuesday) by Theun de Vries (1967)
- Fleurs du mal (The Flowers of Evil) by Charles Baudelaire (1977)
- The Ballad of Reading Gaol by Oscar Wilde (1978)

=== Animation ===
- The Idea (L'Idée) (1932) : collaboration with Berthold Bartosch on an animated adaptation.

=== Works published in journals ===
- Woodcuts in Demain (1916) and Les Tablettes (1916–1919).
- Drawings in La Feuille (1917–1920).

=== Art collections ===
These woodcut collections cover various aspects of their subject material.

==== Solo collections ====
- Arise Ye Dead: The Infernal Resurrection (Debout les Morts: Résurrection infernale, 1917) -- A collection of 10, anti-war woodcuts.
- The Dead Speak (Les Morts Parlent, 1917) -- A collection of 7, anti-war woodcuts.

==== Mixed collections ====
- 1925: An Almanac for Art and Poetry (1925: Ein Almanach für Kunst und Dichtung), published by Kurt Wolff Verlag
