= Rostrum camera =

Special optical device designed to add movement to static images

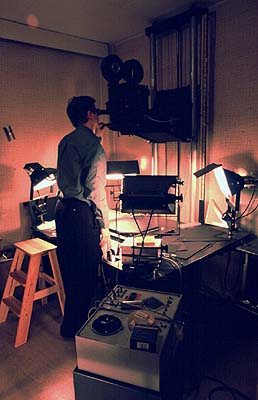
A rostrum camera stand used for shooting animation.

A rostrum camera is a specially designed camera used in television production and filmmaking to animate a still picture or object. It consists of a moving lower platform on which the article to be filmed is placed, while the camera is placed above on a column. Many visual effects can be created from this simple setup, although it is most often used to add interest to static objects. The camera can, for example, traverse across a painting, and using wipes and zooms, change a still picture into a sequence suitable for television or movie productions.

The controls of the camera differ considerably from those of a regular motion picture camera. The key to its operation is one or more frame counters. These enable the camera operator to roll the film backwards and forwards through the film gate, and to know exactly which frame is being exposed at a given time. Also key is the way the operation of the shutter is completely independent from the film transport, so a given frame may be exposed a number of different times, or not at all. Very long exposures are also possible, so that title streaks, zooms and other special effects can be created by keeping the shutter open while moving the camera head up and down the column; rotating or moving the lower platform from side to side; or doing both at the same time. For some of these types of effects, the artwork may be a transparency, which is back-lit by a light source below the table surface.

The camera's film gate is also different from that of a regular motion picture camera, in that fixed pins hold each film frame in place while it is being exposed. This "pin-registered" gate means that the film can be wound backwards and forwards through the camera head many times, but will always return to exactly the same place without any shifts of the film frame. Such precise repeatability is required for multiple exposures, traveling mattes, title superimposition, and a range of other techniques.

The camera is connected to a mechanism that allows an operator to precisely control the movement of the lower platform, as well as of the camera head. The lower platform is often called an animation compound table. In a modern setup, a computer controls the horizontal, vertical and rotational movements of the compound table, the "zooming" (lowering and rising) of the camera head on the column, and the lens bellows.

Early rostrum cameras were largely adapted from existing equipment, but after World War II industry pioneer John Oxberry made some key refinements to the design. His company, Oxberry Products, then went on to produce some of the best-known models, which were used by leading film and animation studios around the world. Other manufacturers included Acme, Forox, Marron Carrel, Mangum Sickles, the German company Crass, and Neilson-Hordell in the UK. Some of these machines were somewhat smaller and more cheaply built than the Oxberry models, but were ideal for general purpose work, such as producing titles and copying artwork to film.

In the UK, Ken Morse is well known for his rostrum camera work in television and film, and his name is often seen in the closing credits of UK productions. In United States–based documentary film making, the use of a rostrum camera for a particular type of panning and zooming effect is sometimes called the Ken Burns effect.

An animation camera or animation stand, used for single frame shooting on film is similar. With a multiplane camera, a 3-dimensional effect can be obtained.
