= Animation camera =

Tools used for animation

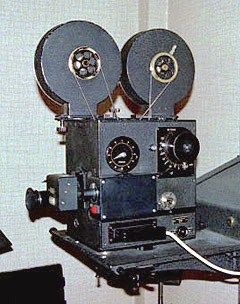
An animation camera manufactured by Crass, Berlin, in 1957.

An animation camera, a type of rostrum camera, is a movie camera specially adapted for frame-by-frame shooting of animation. It consists of a camera body with lens and film magazines, and is most often placed on a stand that allows the camera to be raised and lowered above a table often having both top and underneath lighting. The artwork to be photographed is placed on this table.

For stop motion photography, the camera can also be mounted on a tripod or other support, pointing in any desired direction.

Since most animation is now produced digitally, new animation cameras are not widely manufactured. Image scanners, video cameras and digital SLRs have taken their place.

== Examples of professional animation cameras (16 and 35 mm) ==
A partial list of manufacturers of animation cameras includes:

- Acme Tool and Manufacturing (US)
- Crass (DE)
- Neilson-Hordell (UK)
- Oxberry (US)
- Double M Industries (US)
- A.I.A. Productions (US)
- Mechanical Concepts (US)

The Bell & Howell 2709 (design 27, first made in 1909) is the prototype of the Acme, and the Acme is the prototype of the Oxberry. Each employs a fixed pin and shuttle movement mechanism for film registration and film advancement, respectively. Other names associated with Acme were Producer's Service Corporation and Photo-Sonics, both of which firms manufactured Acme products at various times.

== 16 mm ==
The 16 mm Bolex camera is often used for amateur and semi-professional single frame filming, either using its built-in spring drive, or an attached electric single-frame motor.

== See also ==
- Multiplane camera
