= Berthold Bartosch =

German Bohemian filmmaker and animator (1893–1968)

- Born: 29 December 1893; Polubný, now part of Kořenov, Bohemia, Austria-Hungary (now Czech Republic)
- Died: 13 November 1968 (aged 74); Paris, France
- Occupation: Film-maker
- Notable work: L'Idée (The Idea)

Berthold Bartosch (29 December 1893 – 13 November 1968) was a film-maker, born in Polaun, in the Bohemia region of Austria-Hungary (now part of the Czech Republic).

== Work with Lotte Reiniger ==
He moved to Berlin in 1920 and collaborated with Lotte Reiniger on her paper silhouette animations:

- The Ornament of the Loving Heart
- The Battle of Skagerrak
- The Adventures of Prince Achmed
- Doctor Dolittle

Bartosch created what some consider the first multiplane camera in order to achieve some of the effects for these films.

== Early career ==
In 1911, Berthold Bartosch studied architecture in Vienna, where he met Erwin Hanslick, a teacher at the Fine Art School that was a crucial influence for Bartosch. Hanslick proposed Bartosch collaborate in educational animated films "for the masses", and Bartosch accepted. They created geographical and politically oriented films, which were the only apprenticeship that Bartosch received.

In 1919, Bartosch opened a branch of Hanslick's production company in Berlin, where he met other artists including Berthold Brecht and Jean Renoir. At that time, he collaborated with Lotte Reiniger on Prince Achmed.

== Work in Paris ==
In 1930 Bartosch moved to Paris and created the 30 minute film entitled 'L'Idée' (The Idea) for which he is most remembered. The film is described as the first serious, poetic, tragic work in animation. The film's characters and backdrops were composed of several layers of different types of paper from semi-transparent to thick cardboard. Special effects like halos, smoke and fog were made with lather spread on glass plates and lit from behind. Bartosch based the film on a wordless novel of woodcuts by Frans Masereel, The Idea (1920).

L'idee, when released in 1933, featured a score by composer Arthur Honegger, including an ondes Martenot, which is believed to be the very first use of an electronic musical instrument in film history. The following year, Franz Waxman's score for Liliom (1934) used a theremin.

From 1933 to 1938, Bartosch worked on an anti-war film, St. Francis or Nightmare and Dreams, a 25-minute piece being financed by Thorold Dickinson. When the Nazis invaded Paris, he deposited the film at the Cinémathèque Française. The film was destroyed during the Nazi occupation, and only a few still images exist.

In 1948, he spent a year working for UNESCO in Paris mentoring George Dunning, a Canadian-born animator known for his involvement with the Beatles's animated feature, Yellow Submarine (1968).
