= Silhouette animation =

Animation in which the characters are only visible as black silhouettes

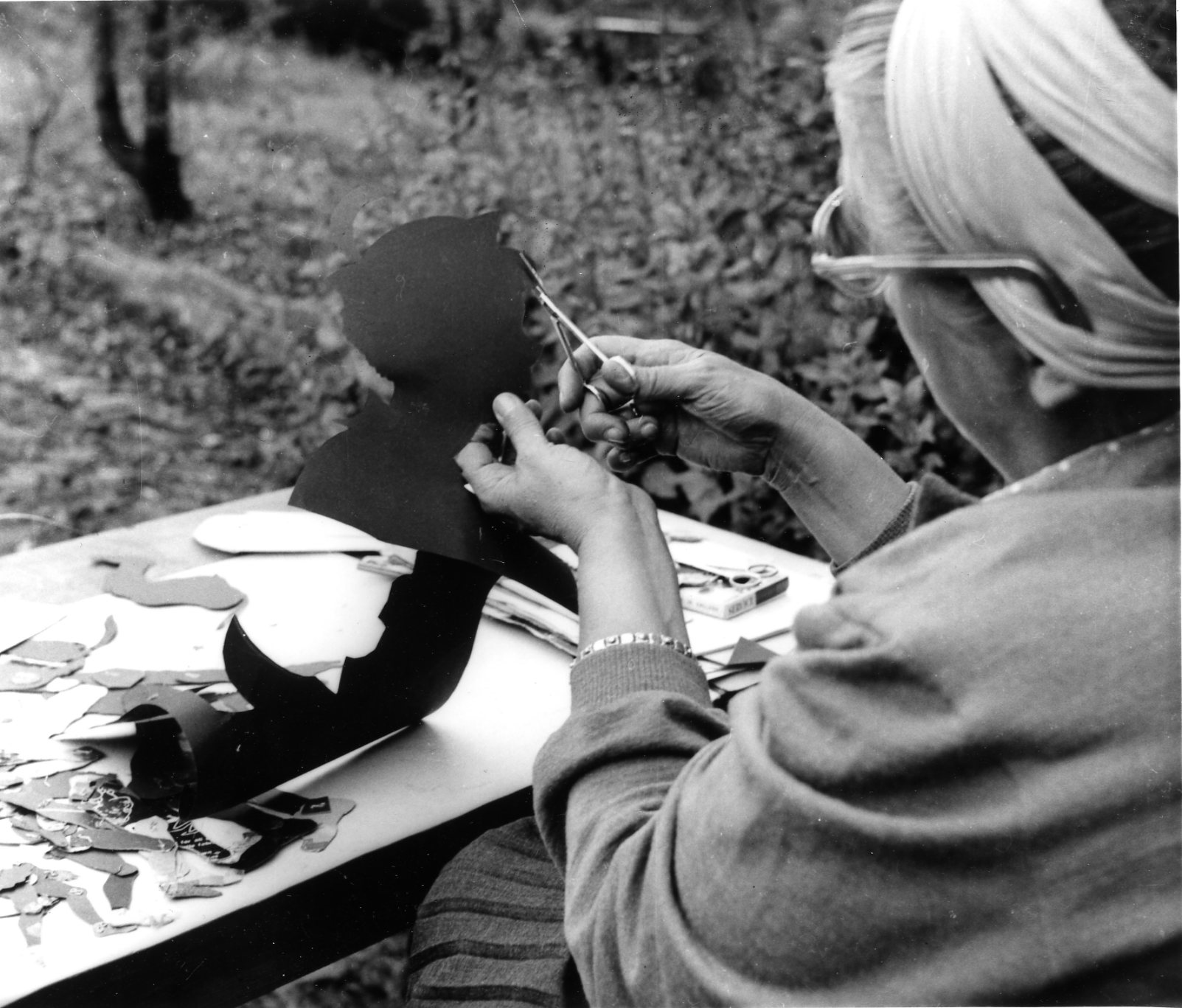
Lotte Reiniger London Abbey Arts Centre Garden 02

Silhouette animation is animation in which the characters are only visible as black silhouettes. This is usually accomplished by backlighting articulated cardboard cut-outs, though other methods exist. It is partially inspired by, but for a number of reasons technically distinct from, shadow play.

== History ==
Inspired by both European shadow play (ombres chinoises) and European silhouette cutting (Etienne de Silhouette and Johann Caspar Lavater), the medium of silhouette animation in film seems to have been invented independently by several people at around the same time, the earliest known being the short subject The Sporting Mice (1909) by British filmmaker Charles Armstrong. The first to have survived is the same director's The Clown and His Donkey (1910). This, and at least one other of Armstrong's films (some stills of which have survived by being reproduced in a book by Georges Sadoul), is in white silhouette on a plain black background. It is, however, most likely that neither the German animator Lotte Reiniger nor the American puppeteer Tony Sarg knew of his work, and it was Reiniger who first established many of what are now the standard practices of the format with her first film, Das Ornament des verliebten Herzens (The Ornament of the Enamoured Heart, 1919).

Reiniger's feature film Die Geschichte des Prinzen Achmed (The Adventures of Prince Achmed, 1926) – one of the oldest of all animated features – coincided with a revival of interest in silhouettes and sparked off several imitators. Her influence is evident as far away as Japan, with Toshio Suzuki's Yonjunin no Tozoku (Forty Burglars, 1928), and as early as 1924, with Hidehiko Okuda, Tomu Uchida and Hakuzan Kimura's Kanimanji Engi (The Tale of Crab Temple). A few silhouette films have also been produced by the National Film Board of Canada.

Today, pure silhouette films made professionally are rare, and fewer still are animators who work primarily within its confines. However, sequences of digital and drawn silhouette animation can be seen, for example, in South Park when the lights are turned off, in an episode of Mona the Vampire (1999) and intermittently in the animation of Sayonara Zetsubō-Sensei (2007). Australian short film The Mysterious Geographic Explorations of Jasper Morello uses a silhouette style closely comparable to Prince Achmed, with creator Anthony Lucas explaining he discovered the technique independently after a lighting fixture failed at his animation desk. The computer animated fan-film Emesis Blue used backlighting and silhouettes to distinguish original background characters from the stock Source Filmmaker assets used for the protagonists.

== Techniques ==
Traditional silhouette animation as invented by Reiniger is subdivision of cutout animation (itself one of the many forms of stop motion). It utilizes figures cut out of paperboard, sometimes reinforced with thin metal sheets, and tied together at their joints with thread or wire (usually substituted by plastic or metal paper fasteners in contemporary productions) which are then moved frame-by-frame on an animation stand and filmed top-down with a rostrum camera – such techniques were used, albeit with stylistic changes, by such practitioners as Noburō Ōfuji in the 1940s and Bruno J. Böttge in the 1970s. Michel Ocelot's television series Ciné si (Cinema If, 1989) was a little different, combining cutouts and cels and also, more occasionally, live-action and clay animation (this series is better known as Princes et princesses, the feature film version mentioned below). This was also the first silhouette animation to successfully make characters appear to speak for themselves (traditionally, either intertitles or voice-over narration had been used) as the mixed medium made accurate lip syncing possible. Traditional animation can also be used to imitate silhouette animation, as seen regularly in Be-PaPas' Shōjo Kakumei Utena (Revolutionary Girl Utena, 1997).

Most recently, several CGI silhouette films have been made, which demonstrate different approaches to the technique – Jossie Malis' use already 2D, vector animation, Michel Ocelot's "Earth Intruders" (2007) and a scene in Azur et Asmar (Azur & Asmar, 2006) use 3D figures rendered as silhouettes, while Anthony Lucas' Academy Award-nominated The Mysterious Geographic Explorations of Jasper Morello (2005) mixes 2D characters and 3D backgrounds, both of which are combination of live action and CGI. Computer animation has also been used to make more explicit reference to shadow theatre – particularly of the Southeast Asian wayang kulit style – by adding visible rods to the characters which appear to be operating them (ironically, in CGI, it is the other way round). This was used in Jan Koester's Our Man in Nirvana (2006) and the opening of the Disney feature The Jungle Book 2 (2003). Michel Ocelot's television series Bergères et dragons (Shepherdesses and Dragons), which, as of March 2008, is still in development, uses a mixture of 2D and 3D computer animation to simulate the look of his earlier, analogue silhouette animation.

However, traditional, cutout silhouette animation is still practised to this day by such people as Edward S. de Leon and Reza Ben Gajra, where it is often combined with other forms of stop motion animation such as Lumage.

=== Use of colour ===
The Adventures of Prince Achmed (1926) uses tinting to distinguish scenes.

Silhouette films are traditionally monochrome, with the foreground solid black and the background being various shades of grey – the more distant an elements in intended to be, the paler the shade of grey, thus creating an illusion of depth. In Die Geschichte des Prinzen Achmed, different scenes were tinted in different all-over colours, as was the standard practice among features of the time. Das Geheimnis der Marquisin (The Marquise's Secret, 1922) is a reversed, white-on-black silhouette film. Jack and the Beanstalk (1955), which Reiniger was forced to shoot in colour, uses full-colour painted backgrounds with the black silhouettes, some of which are inlaid with translucent, coloured, "sweet wrapper" material for a stained glass effect. Though she seems to have made the most of this expanded format, she disapproved of it herself and returned to monochrome films for most of her remaining career, perhaps finding an acceptable middle ground with Aucassin et Nicolette (Aucassin and Nicolette, 1976), which used a more restrained colour palette for its backgrounds (which were built out of pieces of translucent plastic).

Among other, later filmmakers, the dominant method of shooting silhouette films in colour has been to imitate the tinted look of Prinzen Achmed by using backgrounds with many different tones of one colour, or sometimes two close or complementary colours. Full-colour cutout animation in which the characters are mainly seen in profile is sometimes described as colour silhouette film, though this is dependent on one's definition of a silhouette, as opposed to profile or side-on viewpoints in general.

== List of feature-length silhouette films ==
- Die Geschichte des Prinzen Achmed (The Adventures of Prince Achmed, 1926) by Lotte Reiniger
- Pinocchio (1930) by Ugo Amadoro - An unfinished animated film
- Shaka no Shōgai (1961) by Noburō Ōfuji
- Princes et princesses (Princes and Princesses, 2000) by Michel Ocelot
- Tales of the Night (Les Contes de la nuit, 2011) by Michel Ocelot

Note: Ōfuji's and Ocelot's features are compilations of earlier series of shorts.

== List of short silhouette films ==
- Tony Sarg's Almanac (1921-1923) 17 Silent films.
- Silhouette Fantasies (1916)
- Madame Butterfly's Illusion (1940) by Arai Wagorō
- Homeless Home (2020)
