= Story Without Words =

1920 wordless novel by Frans Masereel

Story Without Words (French: Histoire sans paroles: 60 images dessinées et gravées sur bois* Histoire Sans Paroles), is a wordless novel of 1920 by Flemish artist Frans Masereel. In 60 captionless woodcut prints the story tells of a man who strives to win the love of a woman.

== Synopsis ==
A man tries through physical expressions to win the love of a woman. She finally agrees to have sex with him after he threatens suicide. She becomes attached to him, but he leaves her after he is sexually satisfied, leaving her alone to her grief.

== Publication history ==
The book was first published in Geneva in 1920 under the French title Histoire sans paroles: 60 images dessinées et gravées sur bois. A German edition from Kurt Wolff appeared in 1922 under the title Geschichte ohne Worte: 60 Holzschnitte. An English edition did not appear until London publisher Redstone Press released it in 1986 in a paired edition with The Idea (1920), entitled The Idea and Story Without Words: Two Novels Told in Woodcuts. The images in the book were made from woodcuts sized 3 1/2 by 2 3/8 inches (9 cm × 6 cm).

== Style ==
In black-and-white, captionless woodcut images, Masereel places the woman to the left in each composition, where her reaction to her wooer's attempts to impress her are displayed in her facial expression, sometimes favourable and sometimes not. The background mirrors the man's attempts—when he shows her his bicep, circus strongmen appear behind them; when he tries to woo her with song, his pitiable attempts are mocked in the background, where not songbirds but a crow and rooster appear.
