= The Idea (wordless novel) =

1920 novel by Frans Masereel

The idea, represented as a woman, propagates itself on a printing press.

The Idea (French: Idée, sa naissance, sa vie, sa mort, "Idea, her birth, her life, her death")* is a 1920 wordless novel by Flemish artist Frans Masereel (1889–1972). In eighty-three woodcut prints, the book tells an allegory of a man's idea, which takes the form of a naked woman who goes out into the world; the authorities try to suppress her nakedness, and execute a man who stands up for her. Her image is spread through the mass media, inciting a disruption of the social order. Filmmaker Berthold Bartosch made an animated adaptation in 1932.

== Overview ==
An artist is struck with an idea, which manifests itself as a naked woman with long, black hair. He displays her to the public, but the authorities, offended by her nudity, chase her around the city in order to cover up her body. A man who is not offended by her nudity takes to the woman's side, and the two fight injustice together; the man is caught and executed. The authorities destroy all books published with the woman's image, but she finds new outlets in the mass media, and succeeds in disrupting the social order. The woman returns to the artist, who has a new idea—a white-haired woman. He frames and hangs the black-haired woman on the wall, and releases the white-haired woman to the public.

The allegorical book is open to interpretation. It can be seen as representing new ideas, and how they disrupt and are resisted by tradition. From the perspective of the woman, it can be seen as how the image of women is manipulated by society and the media, or how society is threatened by women who express themselves freely.

== Publication history ==
The book first appeared as in 1920 from French publisher Édition Ollendorff under the title Idée, sa naissance, sa vie, sa mort: 83 images, dessinées et gravées sur bois ("Idea, her birth, her life, her death: 83 pictures, drawn and engraved on wood"). It was printed from 83 woodcuts of 9 by 7 centimetres (3 1/2 in × 2 5/8 in) each. Of the 878 copies made, the first 28 were signed and hand-numbered and printed on Japon imperial paper, one in a serious number 1–25 and another A–C. A further 50 printed on Hollande van Gelder paper were unsigned but hand-number in Roman numerals from I to L. The unsigned rest of the run was on volumineux anglais paper.

German publisher Kurt Wolff released a popular edition in 1924 under the German title Die Idee: 83 Holzschitte. An introduction by writer Hermann Hesse prefaced the second edition in 1927. An English edition didn't appear until London publisher Redstone Press released it in 1986 in a paired edition with Story Without Words (1920), entitled The Idea and Story Without Words: Two Novels Told in Woodcuts.

== Legacy ==
American artist Lynd Ward used the concept of an idea surviving oppression in his wordless novel Madman's Drum (1930). Austro-Hungarian filmmaker Berthold Bartosch spent two years on an animated film adaptation of The Idea in 1932; initially Masereel agreed to a collaboration in 1930, but backed out of the production. Bartosch's version has the idea defeated in the end. He tries to create a three-dimensional feeling through the use of multiple levels of animation cels. Film historian William Moritz called it "the first animated film created as an artwork with serious, even tragic, social and philosophical themes". Historian Perry Willett wrote that the film is at times unclear, and was "something of a disappointment".
