= The Adventures of Prince Achmed =

1926 animated film by Lotte Reiniger

- Title card
- Directed by: Lotte Reiniger
- Written by: Lotte Reiniger
- Cinematography: Carl Koch
- Music by: Wolfgang Zeller
- Distributed by: Comenius-Film GmbH
- Release date: 23 September 1926 (Germany)
- Running time: 65 minutes; (at 24 frames/s)
- Country: Germany
- Languages: Silent; German intertitles
- Box office: $100K

The Adventures of Prince Achmed (German: Die Abenteuer des Prinzen Achmed) is a 1926 German animated fairytale film, written and directed by Lotte Reiniger. Since two earlier Quirino Cristiani films are lost, it remains the oldest surviving animated feature film. The plot is based on elements from several One Thousand and One Nights stories, such as Aladdin, Ahmed and Paribanou, and The Ebony Horse.

Prince Achmed features a silhouette animation technique that Reiniger invented by manipulating cardboard cutouts and thin sheets of lead under a camera, similar to Wayang shadow puppets. The original prints featured color tinting. Reiniger also used the first form of a multiplane camera in making the film, one of the most important devices in pre-digital animation. Several famous avant-garde animators worked on Prince Achmed, among them Walter Ruttmann, Berthold Bartosch, and Carl Koch.

== Plot ==
The Adventures of Prince Achmed (1926)

An African sorcerer conjures up a flying horse, which he shows to the Caliph. When the sorcerer refuses to sell it for any amount of gold, the Caliph offers any treasure he has. The sorcerer chooses Dinarsade, the Caliph's daughter, to her great distress. Prince Achmed, Dinarsade's brother, objects, but the sorcerer persuades him to try out the horse. The prince does not know how to control the horse, so it carries the prince away, higher and higher into the sky. The Caliph has the sorcerer imprisoned.

When Achmed discovers how to make the horse descend, he finds himself in a strange foreign land, a magical island called Wak Wak. He is greeted by a bevy of attractive maidens. When they begin fighting for his attention, he flies away to a lake. There, he watches as Pari Banu, the beautiful ruler of the land of Wak Wak, arrives with her attendants to bathe. When they spot him, they all fly away, except for Pari Banu, for Achmed has her magical flying feather costume. She flees on foot, but he captures her. He gains her trust when he returns her feathers. They fall in love. She warns him, however, that the demons of Wak Wak will try to kill him.

The sorcerer frees himself from his chains. Transforming himself into a bat, he seeks out Achmed. The prince chases the sorcerer (who has turned into a kangaroo) and falls into a pit. While Achmed fights a giant snake, the sorcerer takes Pari Banu to China and sells her to the Emperor. The sorcerer returns and pins Achmed under a boulder on top of a mountain. However, the Witch of the Flaming Mountain notices him and rescues Achmed. The sorcerer is her arch-enemy, so she helps Achmed rescue Pari Banu from the Emperor. Then, the demons of Wak Wak find the couple and, despite Achmed's fierce resistance, carry Pari Banu off. Achmed forces a captive demon to fly him to Wak Wak. However, the gates of Wak Wak are locked.

He then slays a monster who is attacking a boy named Aladdin. Aladdin tells of how he, a poor tailor, was recruited by the sorcerer to retrieve a magic lamp from a cave. When Aladdin returned to the cave entrance, the sorcerer demanded the lamp before letting him out. Aladdin refused, so the sorcerer sealed him in. Aladdin accidentally released one of the genies of the lamp and ordered it to take him home. He then courted and married Dinarsade. One night, Dinarsade, Aladdin's magnificent palace, and the lamp disappeared. Blamed by the Caliph, Aladdin fled to avoid being executed. A storm at sea cast him ashore at Wak Wak. When he tried to pluck fruit from a "tree", it turned into a monster and grabbed him, but Achmed killed it.

Achmed realizes the sorcerer had been responsible for Aladdin's fate, and is further enraged. He also reveals to Aladdin that his palace and the lamp were stolen by the sorcerer because of his obsession for Dinarsade. Then, the witch arrives. Since only the lamp can open the gates, she agrees to attack the sorcerer to get it. They engage in a magical duel, each transforming into various creatures (Sorcerer transforms into a lion, a scorpion, a vulture and a sea serpent and Witch transforms into a snake, a rooster and a whale). After a while, they resume their human forms and fling fireballs at each other. Finally, the witch slays the sorcerer.

With the lamp, they are able to enter Wak Wak, just in time to save Pari Banu from being thrown to her death. A fierce battle erupts. A demon steals the lamp, but the witch gets it back. She summons creatures from the lamp who defeat the demons. One hydra-like creature seizes Pari Banu. When Achmed cuts off one of its heads, two more grow back immediately, but the witch stops this regeneration, allowing Achmed to kill it and rescue Pari Banu. A flying palace then settles to the ground. Inside, Achmed, Pari Banu, Aladdin, and the Caliph find Dinarsade. The two couples bid goodbye to the witch and fly home to the palace.

== Production ==
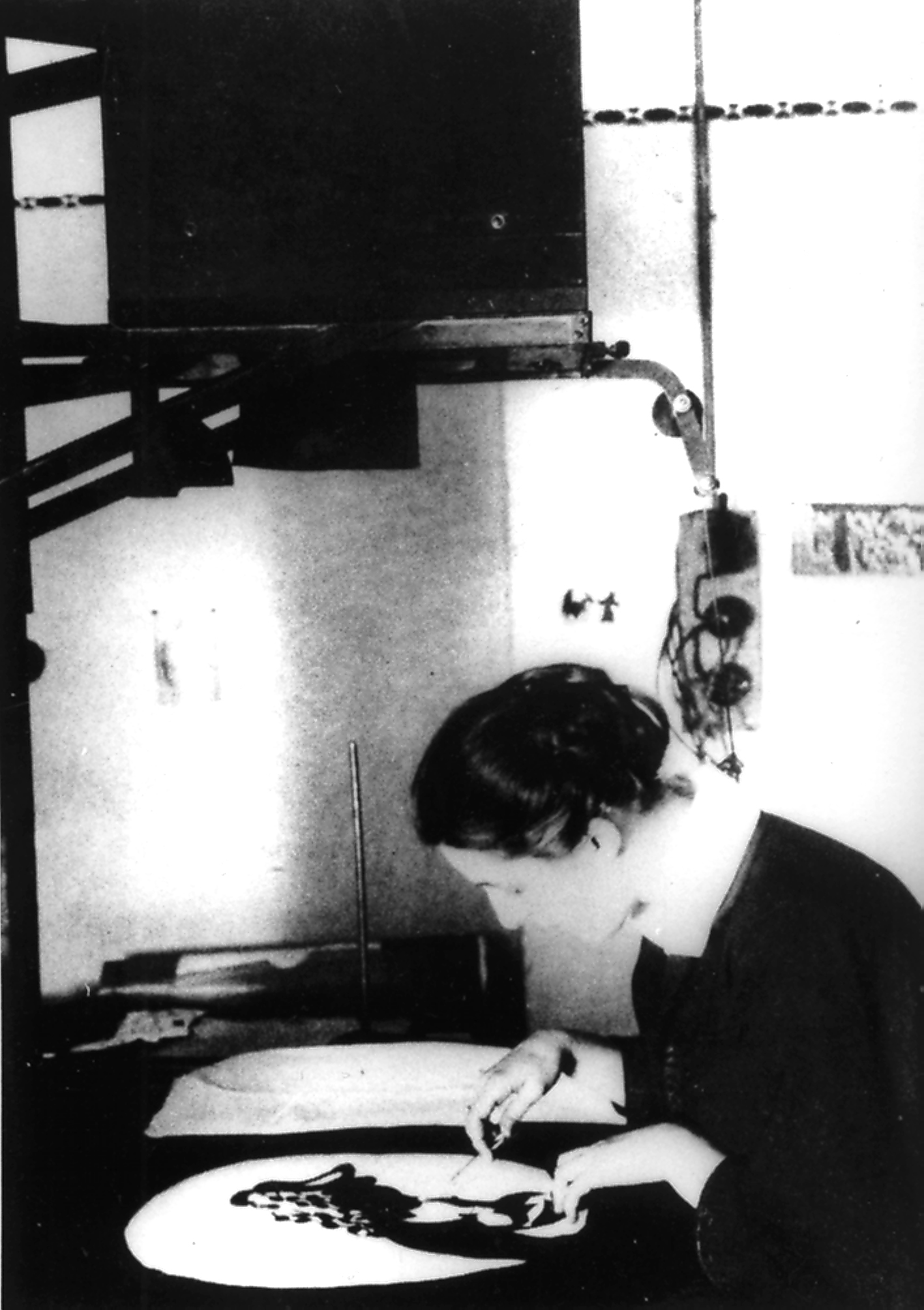
Prince Achmed director Lotte Reiniger working in 1922

Lotte Reiniger needed three years, from 1923 to 1926, to make Prince Achmed. Each frame had to be painstakingly filmed, and 24 frames were needed for every second of animation (although some sources mentions 18 frames per second). Reiniger chose the Arabian Nights for adaptation because she wanted to show events that could only be depicted with animation. Reiniger's team consisted of her husband Carl Koch, Walter Ruttmann, Berthold Bartosch, Alexander Kardan and Walter Turck. A Berlin banker named Louis Hagen financed the movie, and offered the attic of the garage in his vegetable garden as studio. Oskar Fischinger made a wax-slicing machine which was used to visualize magic in several scenes. Another tool was an early version of the multiplane camera. Stars were made by holding a cardboard with small holes in front of a strong light, superimposed pieces of semitransparent tissue paper was used to make waves, and silver paper for moonlit water. For other movable backgrounds, which sometimes included the use of two negatives, they made different layers covered with substances like sand, paint and soap. For the latter, Bartosch would later say about the production of Prince Achmed: "During my years of work I have learned many things. Soap, it is quite extraordinary, with soap one can do everything."

== Release ==
The movie was at first rejected by all theaters, and they failed to find a distributor. So the premiere was a privately sponsored press screening. The invitations were sent mostly by postcards. Among the invited were Fritz Lang and as many people from the media in addition to other filmmakers as possible. Bertolt Brecht helped them by inviting several prominent persons he knew. More than 2000 people showed up.

== Censorship ==
A segment was apparently cut from the movie where a Chinese Emperor and a boy are about to kiss. This part was later said to have been released separately as "Der scheintote Chinese" ("The Seemingly-Dead Chinaman", 1928), but there is no documentation that a several-minutes long independent story about Chinese characters acted as an intermezzo in a linear movie about an Arabic adventure. As it lacks relevance to the main story or the rest of the movie, it is likely that it was always a standalone short.

== Restoration ==
While the original film featured color tinting, prints available just before the restoration had all been in black and white. Working from surviving nitrate prints, German and British archivists restored the film during 1998 and 1999, including reinstating the original tinted image by using the Desmet method.

== Home media ==
English-market DVDs were released, distributed by Milestone Films and available in NTSC R1 (from Image) and PAL R2 (from the BFI). Both versions of the DVD are identical. They feature both an English-subtitled version (the intertitles are in German) and an English voice-over.

== Legacy ==
An homage to this film can be spotted in Disney's Aladdin (1992); a character named Prince Achmed has a minor role in the film. The art style also served as inspiration for the Steven Universe episode "The Answer".

== Score ==
The original score was composed by German composer Wolfgang Zeller in direct collaboration with the animation of the film. Reiniger created photograms for the orchestras, which were common in better theatres of the time, to follow along the action.

=== Modern scoring ===
- The Silk Road Ensemble accompanied the film with a live improvised performance on Western strings and instruments such as the oud, ney and sheng in October 2006 at the Rubin Museum of Art in New York, NY. The Silk Road Ensemble repeated the performance at the Avon Cinema in Providence, Rhode Island, in February 2007.
- London based band Little Sparta composed an original score to the film in 2007 with notable performances at Latitude Festival (2007), The Edinburgh Art Festival (2009) and Mekonville (2017). They have also had runs at theatres and venues in the UK and are continuing to perform it while releasing an EP of selected cues in June 2008.
- New York City band Morricone Youth composed a new score for the film in 2012 and first performed it live at Nitehawk Cinema in Brooklyn on 28 September 2012. Country Club Records released a vinyl 6-song EP of the score in 2016.
- Spanish band Caspervek Trio composed a new soundtrack for the movie in 2014 premiered in Vigo, with further performances in Ourense, Liptovský Míkulás and Madrid.
- The Scottish jazz quartet, S!nk, composed and performed a new score for the film in 2017 as part of the Hidden Door arts festival in Edinburgh as part of a series of events celebrating the re-opening of the Leith Theatre after being closed for 25 years. The performance was also included in the relaunch programme of the Edinburgh Filmhouse following its closure in 2022.
- Students from the Royal Birmingham Conservatoire composed a score for the film, which premiered at the Flatpack Film Festival at Dig Brew Co. on 22 April 2018
- Chris Davies composed a new score for the opening night of the 2014 Bradford animation festival. Using a mixture of recorded and live instrumentation, he has continued touring extensively, playing live with the film throughout the UK and Europe.
- Ben Bentele, David Alderdice, Daniel Be, and Cait Pope composed and improvised a score for the film, which premiered at the Paradise Theater in Paonia, Colorado, USA on 22 April 2023. The performance included a wide array of world instruments and electronic elements.

== Reception ==
The film made $100,156 during a 2007 re-issue. It has a 100% rating on Rotten Tomatoes, based on 21 reviews. The site's critics consensus reads, "The Adventures of Prince Achmed's exquisitely crafted visuals are more than matched by its utterly enchanting story." In a list of the 100 most important German films, compiled in 1994 by the Association of German Cinémathèques, The Adventures of Prince Achmed was placed at #72.
