= Carl Koch (director) =

German art historian, director and writer (1892–1963)

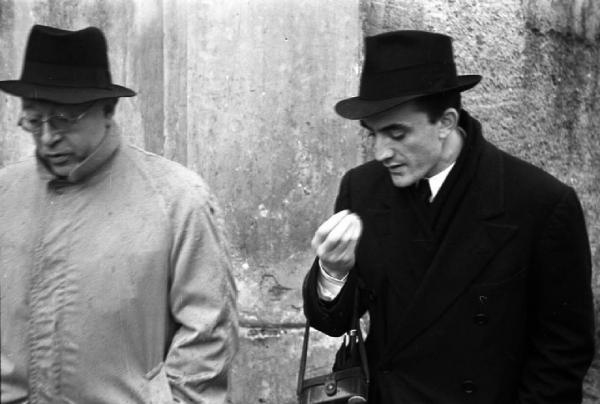
- Born: 30 July 1892; Nümbrecht, Germany
- Died: 1 December 1963 (aged 71); Barnet, England
- Occupations: Film director, screenwriter
- Spouse: Lotte Reiniger

Carl Koch or Karl Koch (30 July 1892 in Nümbrecht, Germany – 1 December 1963 in Barnet, England) was a German art historian, film director and writer with many secondary credits including collaborations with his wife Lotte Reiniger, the animator of The Adventures of Prince Achmed (1926). In these collaborations, Koch often managed the camera work, which was mounted above Reiniger's animation table.

Koch was an art historian, and before he met Reiniger, he made films for museums about art history and other educational matters.

Other than his work with Reiniger, Koch is perhaps best known as assistant to Jean Renoir, who helped get Koch and Reiniger exit visas from Germany in 1936. Koch and Renoir, during the filming of La Grande Illusion (in which Koch has an uncredited role), discovered that Koch's artillery unit had actually fired on Renoir's airplane during World War I.

In 1939, Koch and Renoir began an adaptation of Tosca at Mussolini's invitation. The French government urged Renoir to take the project as a way to keep Italy on their side as the war escalated, but Renoir had to abandon this project when Italy entered the war against France. Koch completed the film as "Carlo Koch", with Luchino Visconti as his assistant.

After the war, in 1949, Koch moved with his wife to England where they settled in an artists' community called the Abbey Arts Centre in New Barnet. Together, they made 13 silhouette films for television and many others for various other producers in these later years.

== Filmography ==
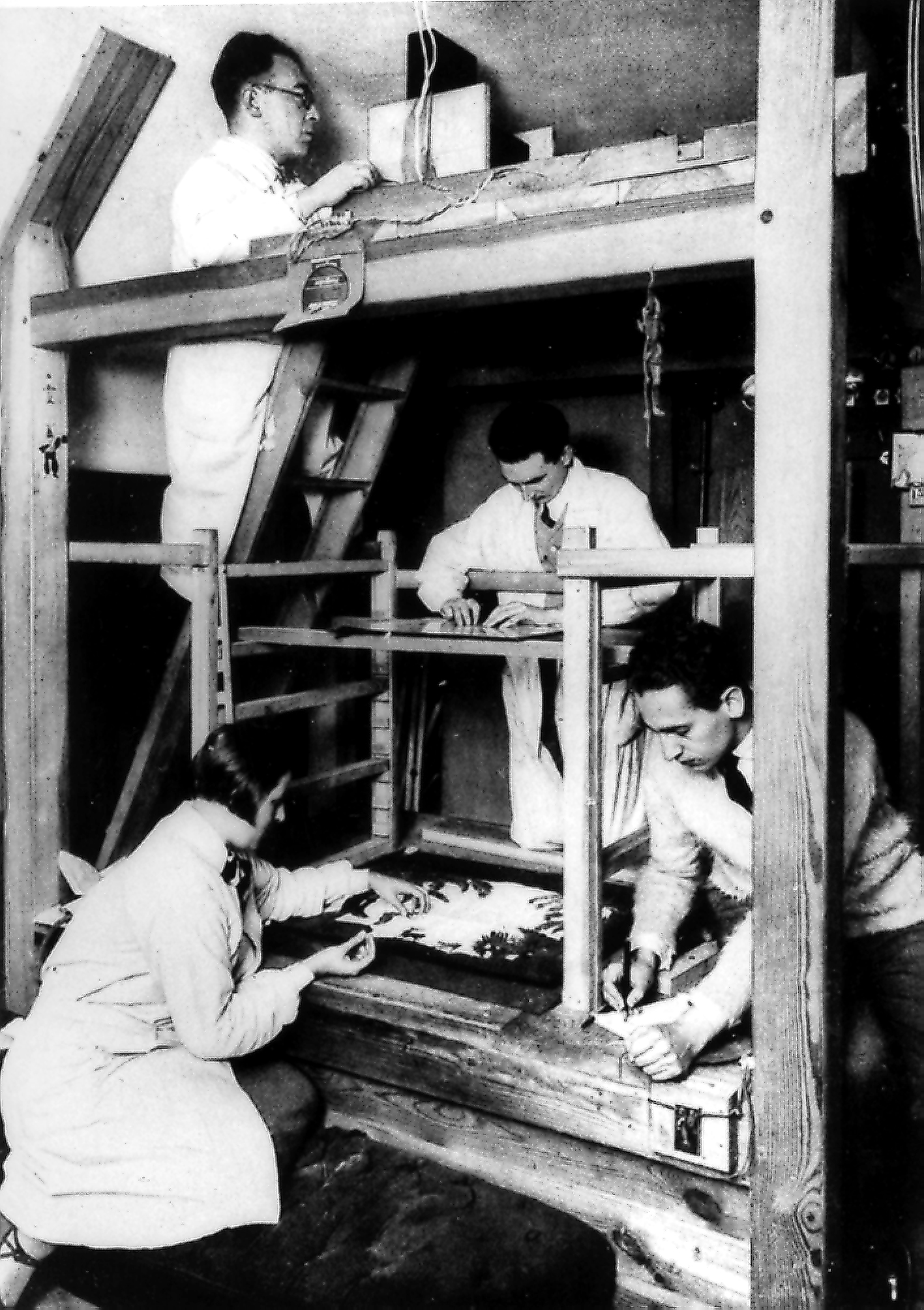
Lotte Reiniger, Koch, assistants Walter Türck, Alexander Kardan

- 1919 Das Ornament des verliebten Herzens, other
- 1920/1921 Der fliegende Koffer, camera
- 1920 Amor und das standhafte Liebespaar, camera
- 1921 Der Stern von Bethlehem, camera
- 1921/1922 Das Geheimnis der Marquise, other
- 1922 Dornröschen, camera
- 1922/1923 Aschenputtel, camera
- 1922–1924 Kind und Welt: Das Großstadtkind und die Gartenarbeitsschule, writer, director
- 1923–1926 Die Abenteuer des Prinzen Achmed, cinematography, director (uncredited)
- 1924 Die Barcarole, other
- 1927 Der scheintote Chinese, other
- 1926/1928 Ägyptische Reise. Eine Expedition durch das älteste Land der Welt, writer, director, produce, camera
- 1928 Der scheintote Chinese [second version?], other
- 1928 Doktor Dolittle und seine Tiere [1-part version], cinematography
- 1928 Doktor Dolittle und seine Tiere. (originally with music by Paul Dessau, Kurt Weill and Paul Hindemith), cinematography
  - 1. Abenteuer: Die Reise nach Afrika
  - 2. Abenteuer: Die Affenbrücke
  - 3. Abenteuer: Die Affenkrankheit
- 1929 Der Tod (aka Totentanz, from Brecht's The Baden-Baden Lesson on Consent), director
- Chasing Fortune (1930), writer, assistant director, producer
- 1930 Zehn Minuten Mozart, cinematography
- 1931/1932 Harlekin, other
- 1932 Nippon, director
- 1932 Sissi, other
- 1933/1934 Das rollende Rad, other
- 1934 Das gestohlene Herz, other
- 1934 Das rollende Rad. Ein Film von Wagen und Straßen, writer
- 1934 Der Graf von Carabas, other
- 1934/1935 Der kleine Schornsteinfeger, other
- 1935 Papageno, other
- 1935 Galathea, producer
- La Marseillaise (1938) screenplay
- La Règle du jeu (1939) assistant director
- Cristobal's Gold (1940)
- Tosca (1941) begun by Renoir
- Girl of the Golden West (1942)
- Night of the Silvery Moon (1954)
