= Lotte Reiniger =

German silhouette animator and film director (1899–1981)

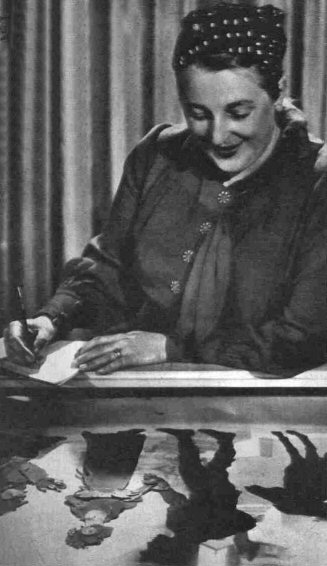
- Reiniger in 1939
- Born: Charlotte Reiniger; 2 June 1899; Berlin-Charlottenburg, German Empire
- Died: 19 June 1981 (aged 82); Dettenhausen, West Germany
- Occupations: Silhouette animator, film director
- Years active: 1918–1979
- Notable work: The Adventures of Prince Achmed (1926); Girl of the Golden West (1942)
- Spouse: Carl Koch

Charlotte "Lotte" Reiniger (2 June 1899 – 19 June 1981) was a German film director and the foremost pioneer of silhouette animation. Her best known films are The Adventures of Prince Achmed, from 1926, the oldest surviving feature-length animated film, and Papageno (1935). Reiniger is also noted for having devised, from 1923 to 1926, the first form of a multiplane camera, one of the most important devices in pre digital animation. Reiniger worked on more than 40 films throughout her career.

== Biography ==
=== Early life ===
Lotte Reiniger was born in the Charlottenburg district of Berlin on 2 June 1899 to Carl Reiniger and Eleonore Lina Wilhelmine Rakette. As a child, she became fascinated with Scherenschnitte. She studied at Fontane-Schule in Berlin and put on shows with her schoolmates. Throughout this time in her life is when she began to develop a love of theater and cultivated her then dreams of becoming a play actress. Reiniger translated her love of acting to her silhouette puppetry in order to create her unique and fanciful recreations of her favorite plays and fairytales.

As a teenager, Reiniger developed a love of cinema, first with the films of Georges Méliès for their special effects, then the films of the actor and director Paul Wegener, a German actor, writer, and film director known for his pioneering role in German expressionist cinema and The Golem (1920). In 1916, her love of theater led Reiniger to her future mentor and colleague when she attended a lecture by Wegener that focused on the fantastic possibilities of animation. Reiniger eventually convinced her parents to allow her to enroll in the acting group to which Wegener belonged, the Theatre of Max Reinhardt. She began by making costumes and props and working backstage for Wegener's play productions. She started making silhouette portraits of her classmates and the actors around her, which intrigued Paul Wegener and led to her future collaborations with the director. Soon enough she was making elaborate title cards for Wegener's films, many of which featured her silhouette animations.

=== Adulthood and success ===
In 1918, Reiniger animated wooden rats and created the animated intertitles for Wegener's Der Rattenfänger von Hameln (The Pied Piper of Hamelin). The success of this work got her admitted into the Institut für Kulturforschung (Institute for Cultural Research), an experimental animation and short-film studio. It was here that she met her future creative partner and husband (from 1921), Carl Koch, as well as other avant-garde artists including Hans Cürlis, Bertolt Brecht, and Berthold Bartosch. She began animating films of her own.

The first film Reiniger directed was Das Ornament des verliebten Herzens (The Ornament of the Enamoured Heart, 1919), a five-minute piece involving two lovers and an ornament that reflects their moods. The film was an early showcase for Reiniger's style of expression through movement. The film was very well received, and its success opened up many new connections for Reiniger in the animation industry, not just in Germany but internationally as well. She continued to work on short films and advertisements during this time.

Cinderella (1922)

She made six short films over the next few years, all produced and photographed by her husband, including the fairytale animation Aschenputtel (1922), based on the Brothers Grimm telling of Cinderella. These shorts were interspersed with advertising films (the Julius Pinschewer advertising agency sponsored a large number of abstract animators during the Weimar period) and special effects for various feature films—most famously a silhouette falcon for a dream sequence in Part One of Die Nibelungen by Fritz Lang. During this time, she found herself at the centre of a large group of ambitious German animators, including Bartosch, Hans Richter, Walter Ruttmann and Oskar Fischinger.

Reiniger's first feature film, The Adventures of Prince Achmed (1926)

In 1923, she was approached by Louis Hagen, who had bought a large quantity of raw film stock as an investment to fight the spiraling inflation of the period. He asked her to make a feature-length animated film. Reiniger later recalled, "We had to think twice. This was a never heard of thing. Animated films were supposed to make people roar with laughter, and nobody had dared to entertain an audience with them for more than ten minutes. Everybody to whom we talked in the industry about the proposition was horrified." The resulting film was The Adventures of Prince Achmed, based on One Thousand and One Nights. Completed in 1926, The Adventures of Prince Achmed is believed to be the oldest surviving feature-length animated film, debuting over a decade prior to Walt Disney's Snow White and the Seven Dwarfs. (It was predated by Argentine director Quirino Cristiani's El Apóstol, released in 1917, but no copies of this film are known to survive.) Although it failed to find a distributor for almost a year, once premiered in Paris (thanks to the support of Jean Renoir), it became a critical and popular success.

Reiniger developed a predecessor to the multiplane camera for certain effects. As described in Reiniger's book Shadow Puppets, Shadow Theatres, and Shadow Films, she placed backlit planes of glass in front of a camera with a manual shutter to achieve a layered effect. Again, she presaged Disney; only in the 1930s would Disney and Ub Iwerks develop the version of the multiplane camera that would become a mainstay of traditional animation. In addition to Reiniger's silhouette characters, Prince Achmed featured dream-like backgrounds by Walter Ruttmann (her partner in the Die Nibelungen sequence) and Walter Türck, and a symphonic score by Wolfgang Zeller. Additional effects were added by Carl Koch and Berthold Bartosch.

Following the success of Prince Achmed, Reiniger was able to make a next film. Doktor Dolittle und seine Tiere (Doctor Dolittle and his Animals, 1928) was based on the first of the English children's books by Hugh Lofting. The film tells of the doctor's voyage to Africa to help heal sick animals. It is currently available only in a television version with new music, voice-over narration, and a high framerate. The score of this three-part film was composed by Kurt Weill, Paul Hindemith and Paul Dessau.

She released Der scheintote Chinese (The seemingly dead Chinese-Man, 1928), the first animated film with a queer happy end.de:Liste von Filmen mit homosexuellem Inhalt

A year later, Reiniger co-directed her first live-action film with Rochus Gliese, Die Jagd nach dem Glück (The Pursuit of Happiness, 1929), a tale about a shadow-puppet troupe. The film starred Jean Renoir and Berthold Bartosch and included a 20-minute silhouette performance by Reiniger. The film was completed just as sound came to Germany, and release of the film was delayed until 1930 to dub in voices by different actors.

Reiniger attempted to make a third animated feature, inspired by Maurice Ravel's opera L'enfant et les sortilèges (The Child and the Bewitched Things, 1925), but was unable to clear all of the individual rights to Ravel's music, the libretto (by the novelist Colette), and an unexpected number of copyright holders. When Ravel died in 1937, the clearance became even more complex and Reiniger finally abandoned the project, although she had designed sequences and animated some scenes to convince potential backers and the rights-holders.

Reiniger worked on several films with British poet, critic, and musician Eric Walter White, who wrote an early book-length essay on her work.

=== Flight from Germany and later life ===
With the rise of the Nazi Party, Reiniger and Koch had difficulties to work in Germany and took the chance to move to London, without ever gaining permanent visas. As a result, the couple spent the years 1933–1944 moving from country to country, staying as long as visas would allow. With the release of sound film, Reiniger and her husband began to work with music in relation to animation. They worked with film-makers Jean Renoir in Paris and Luchino Visconti in Rome. They managed to make 12 films during this period, the best-known being Carmen (1933) and Papageno (1935), both based on popular operas (Bizet's Carmen and Mozart's Die Zauberflöte). When World War II commenced they stayed with Visconti in Rome until 1943. When the SS invaded Rome, they fled to Venice, where they tried in vain to make a living from illustrations and essays. Due to the lack of funds they had to return to Berlin, where at least they could stay with Reiniger's mother. Reiniger startet to work on a fairy-tale film for schools, Die Goldene Gans, which she did not complete until 1948.

Mary's Birthday (1951), a public information film by Reiniger

In 1949, Reiniger and Koch moved to London, where she made a few short advertising films for John Grierson and his General Post Office Film Unit (later to be renamed the "Crown Film Unit"). By 1953, Reiniger had founded Primrose Production with Louis Hagen Jr., the son of the financier of Prince Achmed. With this company, she made over a dozen short silhouette films based on Grimms’ Fairy Tales for the BBC and Telecasting America. Reiniger continued to work on and off over the years, her last film being 'The Rose and the Ring,' released in 1979.

In the early 1950s, Reiniger lived in London and worked at Beconsfield Studios in Buckinghamshire. During this time, she became friends with Freddy Bloom, the chair of the National Deaf Children's Society and editor of quarterly magazine called TALK, for which she designed a logo that was used until the 1990s.

With Louis Hagen Jr. (the son of Reiniger's financier of Prince Achmed in Potsdam), they founded Primrose Productions in 1953 and, over the next two years, produced more than a dozen short silhouette films based on Grimms' Fairy Tales for the BBC and Telecasting America. Reiniger also provided illustrations for the 1953 book King Arthur and His Knights of the Round Table by Roger Lancelyn Green.

After a period of seclusion after her husband's death in 1963, renewed interest in her work resulted in Reiniger's return to Germany. She later visited the United States, and began making films again soon after. She made three more films, the last of which, Die vier Jahreszeiten, (The Four Seasons) was completed the year before she died.

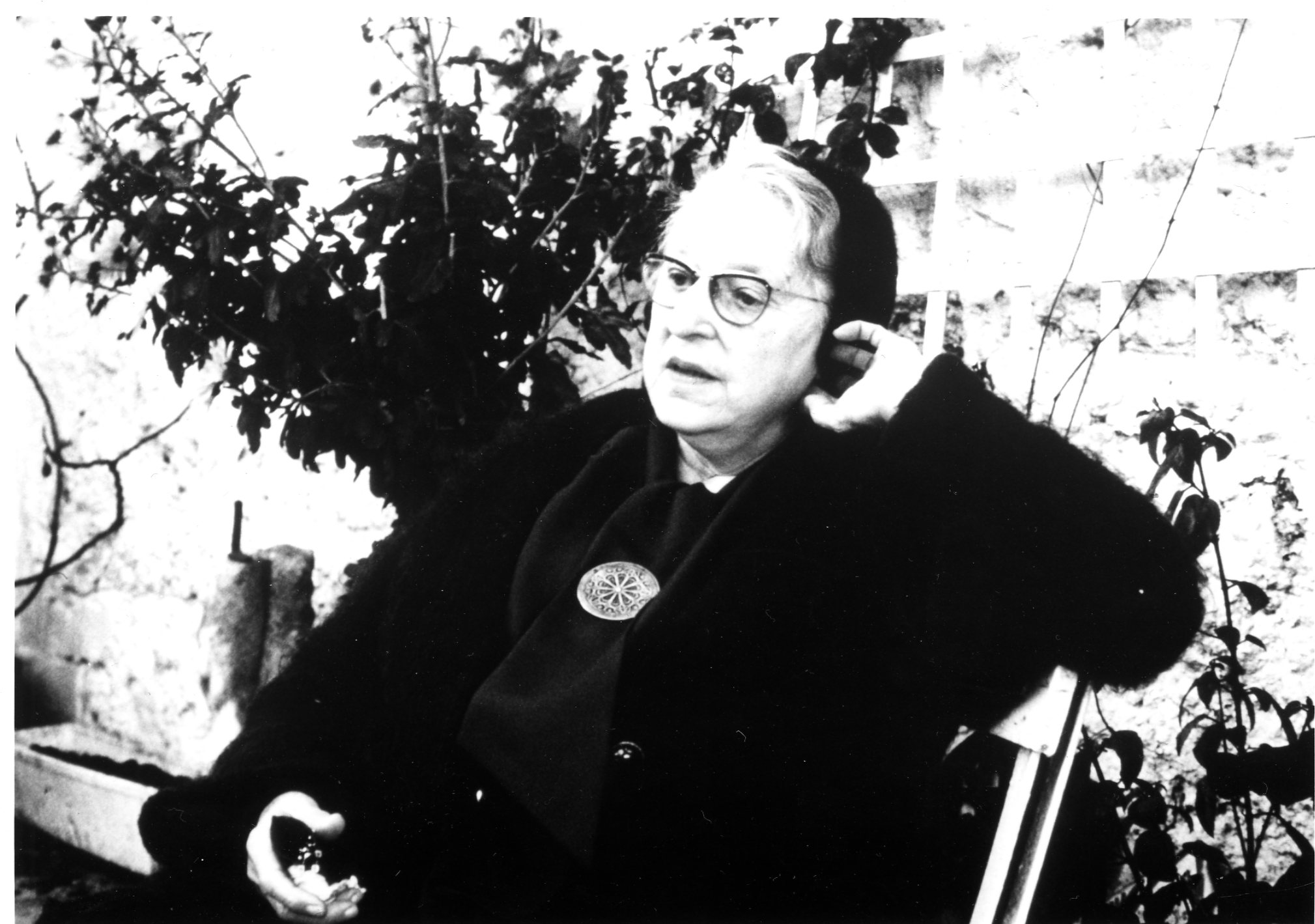
Reiniger in 1970

Reiniger was awarded the Filmband in Gold of the Deutscher Filmpreis in 1972; in 1979 she received the Great Cross of the Order of Merit of the Federal Republic of Germany. Reiniger died in Dettenhausen, Germany, on 19 June 1981, at the age of 82.

== Art style ==
Reiniger's art style was developed from her love of paper animation and the theater. Reiniger had a distinct art style in her animations that was very different from other artists in the time period of the 1920s and the 1930s, particularly in terms of characters.

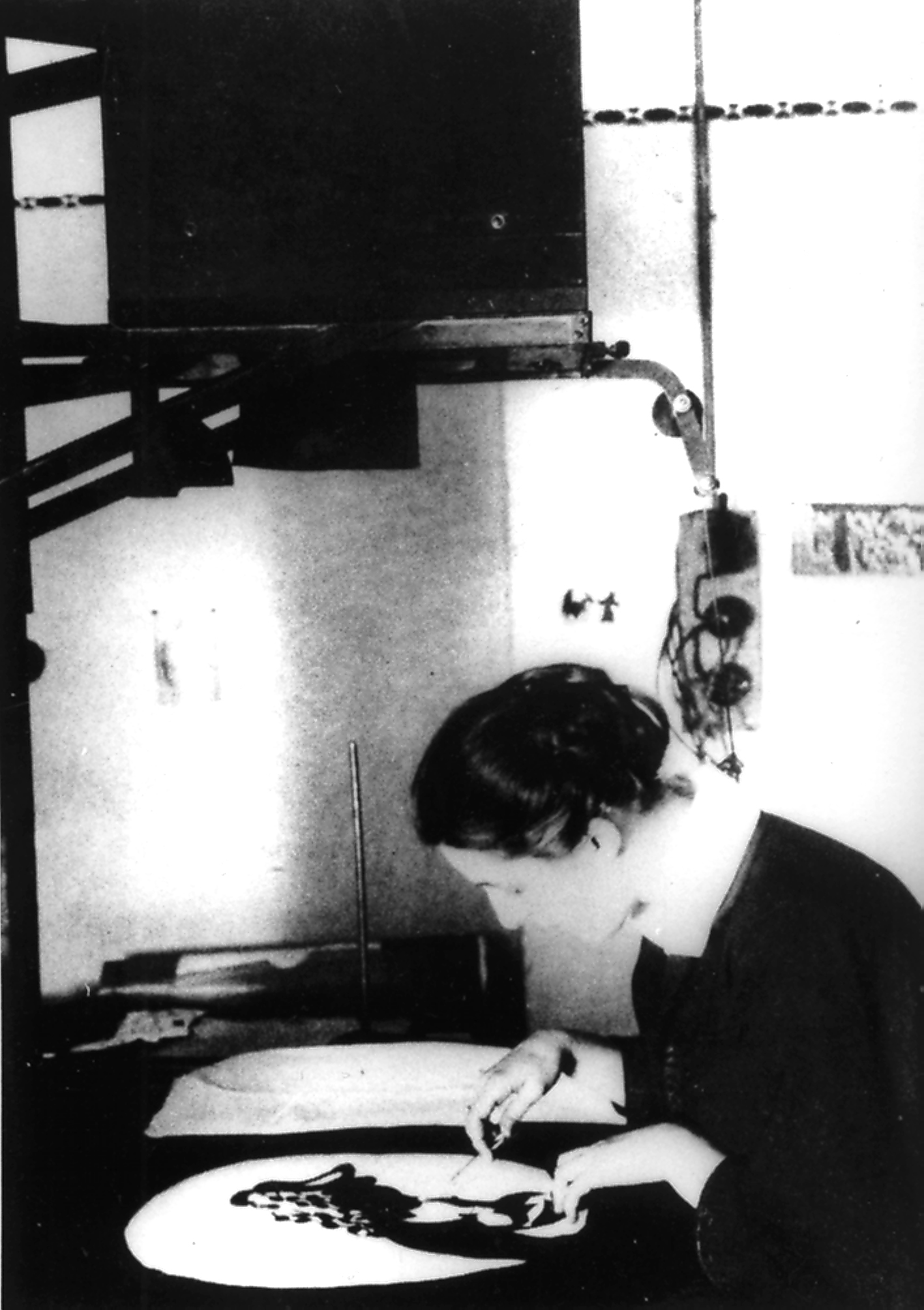
Reiniger working on a cutout in 1922

In the 1920s especially, characters tended to rely on facial expressions to express emotions or action, while Reiniger's characters relied on gestures to display emotions or actions. Reiniger's cutout animations had a fluid quality that expressed characters' emotions and actions in a way that was not possible through traditional silent film. This was due to the unique way she shaped and animated her characters through the paper cutout techniques that she developed through practice. Because paper animations were forced to rely on gestures and action due to the nature of the medium, Reiniger was able to convey emotion that facial expressions or sound film could not imitate. Because of this, Reiniger's characters are not usually anatomically correct, but they are able to express a fluidity which is very important to her style of expressionism. Although there are other animators in that time period that used these techniques, Reiniger stands out because she is able to accomplish this style using cutout animation. Reiniger's figures resemble stop-motion animation in the way that they move.

She also utilized the technique of metamorphosis often in her animations. This focus on transformation greatly benefits her tendency to work with fairytale stories. The Adventures of Prince Achmed specifically adapts fantastic elements to take advantage of animation to show things that could not be shown in reality. Reiniger considered animation's separation from the laws of the material plane to be one of the greatest strengths of the medium.

At that time, film did not have the technological advancements to create magical special effects, thus many fairytales that showcased extravagant magical events were not as desirable for filmmakers. However, through animation, such whimsical effects were possible through her paper animations. Reiniger's detailed settings and colourful backgrounds meant that her style translated well into her love of fairytale stories.

== Influence ==
Lotte Reiniger’s work was influenced by several sources. Following her escape from Germany, her travels throughout Europe continued to shape the course of her work. While in Greece she studied the Greek puppet show Karagiozis. Karagiozis is a traditional character in Greek folklore whose stories are performed through puppetry and traditionally with shadow puppets. The influence of Karagiozis can be seen in Reiniger’s work where the subject of many of her films are long established fairy tale stories that have been enjoyed by generations of children and adults alike.

The influence of traditional Chinese shadow puppetry is also one of the defining characteristics of Reiniger’s work. Chinese puppetry dates back to the Han dynasty, but their methods of puppetry are clearly reflected in Reiniger’s techniques. Chinese shadow puppets were historically made using donkey skin and treated to be translucent. They were then mounted using iron wire and bamboo sticks as handles. Reiniger’s puppets were made from tracing paper and cardboard, and sometimes included 20–50 separate pieces that were fused together with lead wire.

Aside from the origins of her technical inspiration, her subjects were often influenced by operatic themes. Music was the driving force behind many of the storylines as well as the movements and actions of the puppets. She used the music of composers such as Mozart, Bizet, and Offenbach, as well as contemporary artists like Paul Dessau and Wolfgang Zeller. Jean Renoir, a good friend of Reiniger's, once described her work as "visual expression of Mozart's music".

== Legacy, honors, and preservation ==
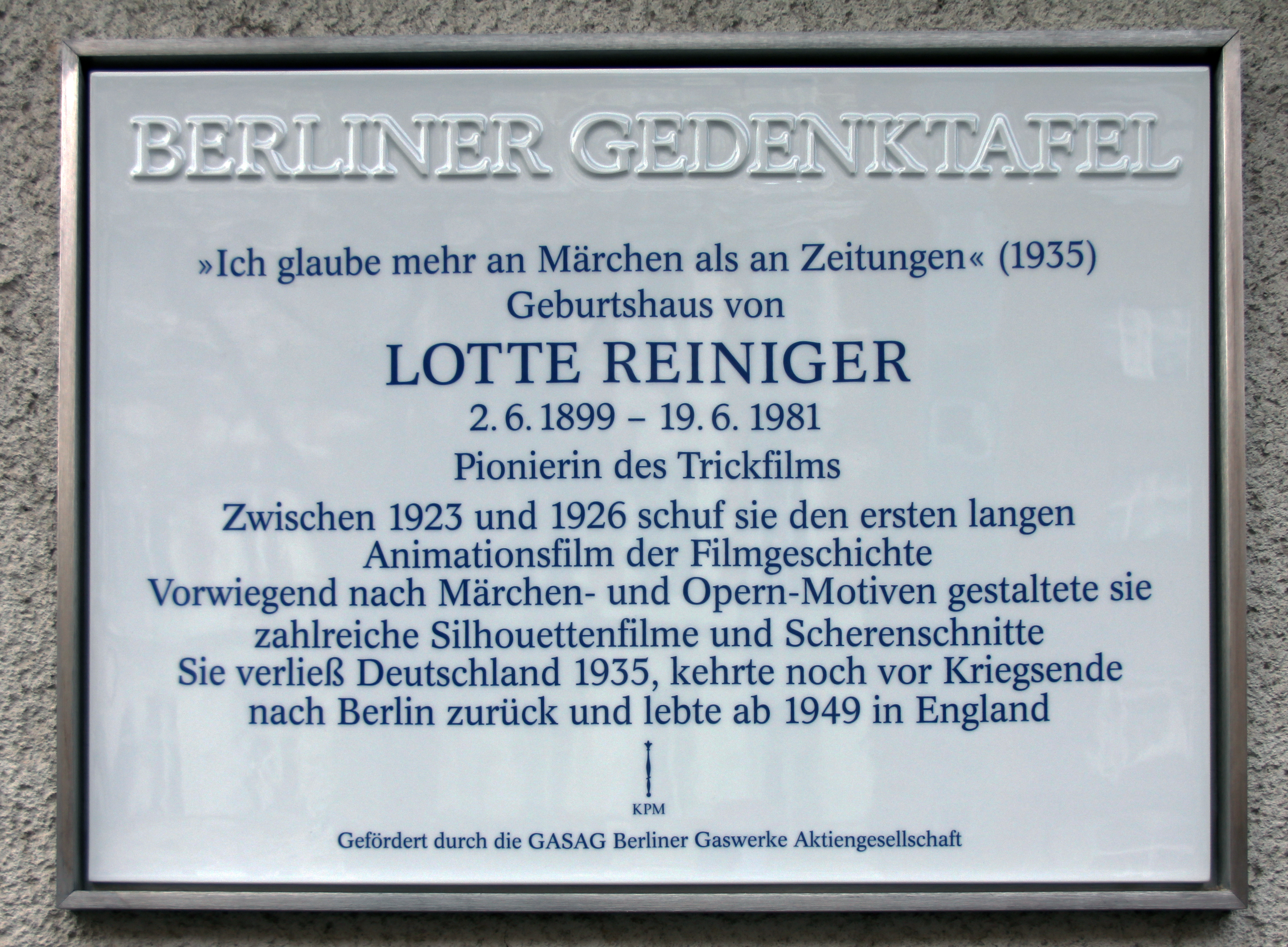
A plaque commemorating Reiniger at her former home on Knesebeckstraße in Berlin, Germany.

Reiniger's black silhouettes would become a popular aesthetic to reference in films and art. Films and television shows such as Lemony Snicket's A Series of Unfortunate Events, Harry Potter and the Deathly Hallows - Part 1, Steven Universe, and Bram Stoker's Dracula all make reference to Reiniger’s style with extended animated silhouette puppet sequences. French animator Michel Ocelot has extensively shown Reiniger’s influence on his work, beginning with the 1989 television series Ciné si, which employs many of the techniques created by Reiniger, along with others of Ocelot’s own invention. Ocelot’s films, such as Princes et princesses, The Three Inventors, and Kirikou and the Sorceress showcase character designs and layouts deeply inspired by Reiniger.

Walt Disney Animation Studios used the multiplane camera extensively in films such as Snow White and the Seven Dwarfs and The Old Mill, based on the technology that Reiniger originally developed.

Reiniger's films were the first to move animation from solely comedic narratives. At the time, animated short films rarely had a narrative, and any narrative that they did have was shallow and only present in the film to support the character’s slapstick comedy. Throughout all of her films, both short and feature length, Reininger strives to portray serious narrative through the art of animation. Thus, gaining a much larger respect for the medium in the film industry.

Reiniger served to be one of the first filmmakers in the 20th century to attempt a portrayal of the queer experience with a pair of openly gay lovers in her film The Adventures of Prince Achmed. Although this was censored in the version of the film that was distributed to theaters, Reiniger herself was outspoken on her motivation to destigmatize homosexual realities in the world of film. “I knew lots of homosexual men and women from the film and theater world in Berlin, and saw how they suffered from stigmatization.”

In 2017, the European Animation Awards created the Lotte Reiniger Lifetime Achievement Award in order to recognize individuals for their lifetime contribution to the art of animation in either producing, directing, animating, design, writing, voice acting, sound and sound effects, technical work, music, professional teaching, or for other endeavors which exhibit an outstanding contribution to excellence in animation. The very first recipient of this award was Richard Williams, the animation director of Who Framed Roger Rabbit and author of The Animator's Survival Kit.

The municipal museum in Tübingen holds much of her original materials and hosts a permanent exhibition, "The World in Light and Shadow: Silhouette, shadow theatre, silhouette film". The Filmmuseum Düsseldorf also holds many materials of Lotte Reiniger's work, including her animation table, and a part of the permanent exhibition is dedicated to her. Collections relating to her are also held at the BFI National Archive.

On June 2, 2016, Google celebrated Reiniger's 117th birthday with a Google Doodle about her.

The Lottie file format for vector animation, which is considered by many designers to be the best website animation format, is named for Reiniger.

In 2024, Reiniger was posthumously awarded the Winsor McCay Award at that year’s Annie Awards in recognition of her “unparalleled achievement and exceptional contributions to animation”.

In 2026 the biographical novel 24 Bilder pro Sekunde – Lotte Reiniger, Pionierin des Trickfilms by author and distant relative Rike Reiniger was released. This novel includes unknown sources and new findings, i.e. about Reiniger's queer identity.

== Awards ==
- 1936 – Venice Film Festival: Mussolini Cup for Best Foreign Film – Nominee
- 1972 – German Film Awards: Honorary Award – Winner

== Filmography ==
- 1919 – The Ornament of the Lovestruck Heart
- 1920 – Amor and the Steady Loving Couple
- 1921 – The Star of Bethlehem
- 1922 – Sleeping Beauty
- 1922 – The Flying Suitcase
- 1922 – The Secret of the Marquise
- 1922 – Cinderella (1922 1922 Lotte Reiniger film)
- 1926 – The Adventures of Prince Achmed (feature)
- 1927 – The Chinese Nightingale
- 1928 – Dr. Dolittle and His Animals (3 parts: "The Journey to Africa", "The Monkey Bridge", "The Monkey Illness")
- 1930 – Ten Minutes of Mozart
- 1931 – Harlekin
- 1932 – Sissi
- 1933 – Carmen
- 1934 – The Stolen Heart
- 1935 – The Seemingly Dead Chinese
- 1935 – The Little Chimney Sweep
- 1935 – Galathea: The Living Marblestatue
- 1935 – Die Jagd nach dem Glück (Hunt for Luck)
- 1935 – Caliph Stork
- 1935 – Papageno
- 1936 – Puss in Boots
- 1936 – Silhouettes
- 1937 – The Tocher (film)
- 1938 – The HPO – Heavenly Post Office
- 1944 – The Goose That Lays the Golden Eggs
- 1951 – Mary's Birthday
- 1953 – The Magic Horse
- 1954 – Aladdin and the Magic Lamp (1954)
- 1954 – Caliph Stork
- 1954 – Cinderella
- 1954 – Puss in Boots
- 1954 – Snow White and Rose Red
- 1954 – The Frog Prince
- 1954 – The Gallant Little Tailor
- 1954 – The Little Chimney Sweep
- 1954 – The Sleeping Beauty
- 1954 – The Three Wishes
- 1954 – Thumbelina
- 1955 – Hansel and Gretel
- 1955 – Jack and the Beanstalk
- 1956 – The Grasshopper and the Ant
- 1956 – The Star of Bethlehem, co-directed with Vivian Milroy.
- 1961 – The Frog Prince
- 1974 – The Lost Son
- 1975 – Aucassin and Nicolette
- 1979 – The Rose and the Ring
- 1980 – Die vier Jahreszeiten (The Four Seasons)

=== Other contributions ===
- 1930 – Chasing Fortune – co-writer
- 1936 – Silhouettes – animation scenes
- 1942 – Girl of the Golden West – co-writer
