= Multiplane camera =

Camera used in traditional animation

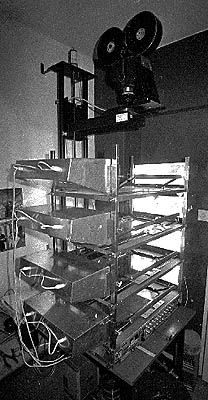
Multiplane camera

The multiplane camera is a motion-picture camera that was used in the traditional animation process that moves a number of pieces of artwork past the camera at various speeds and at various distances from one another. This creates a sense of parallax or depth.

Various parts of the artwork layers are left transparent to allow other layers to be seen behind them. The movements are calculated and photographed frame by frame, with the result being an illusion of depth by having several layers of artwork moving at different speeds: the further away from the camera, the slower the speed. The multiplane effect is sometimes referred to as a parallax process.

One variation is to have the background and foreground move in opposite directions. This creates an effect of rotation. An early example is the scene in Walt Disney's Snow White and the Seven Dwarfs where the Evil Queen drinks her potion, and the surroundings appear to spin around her.

== History ==
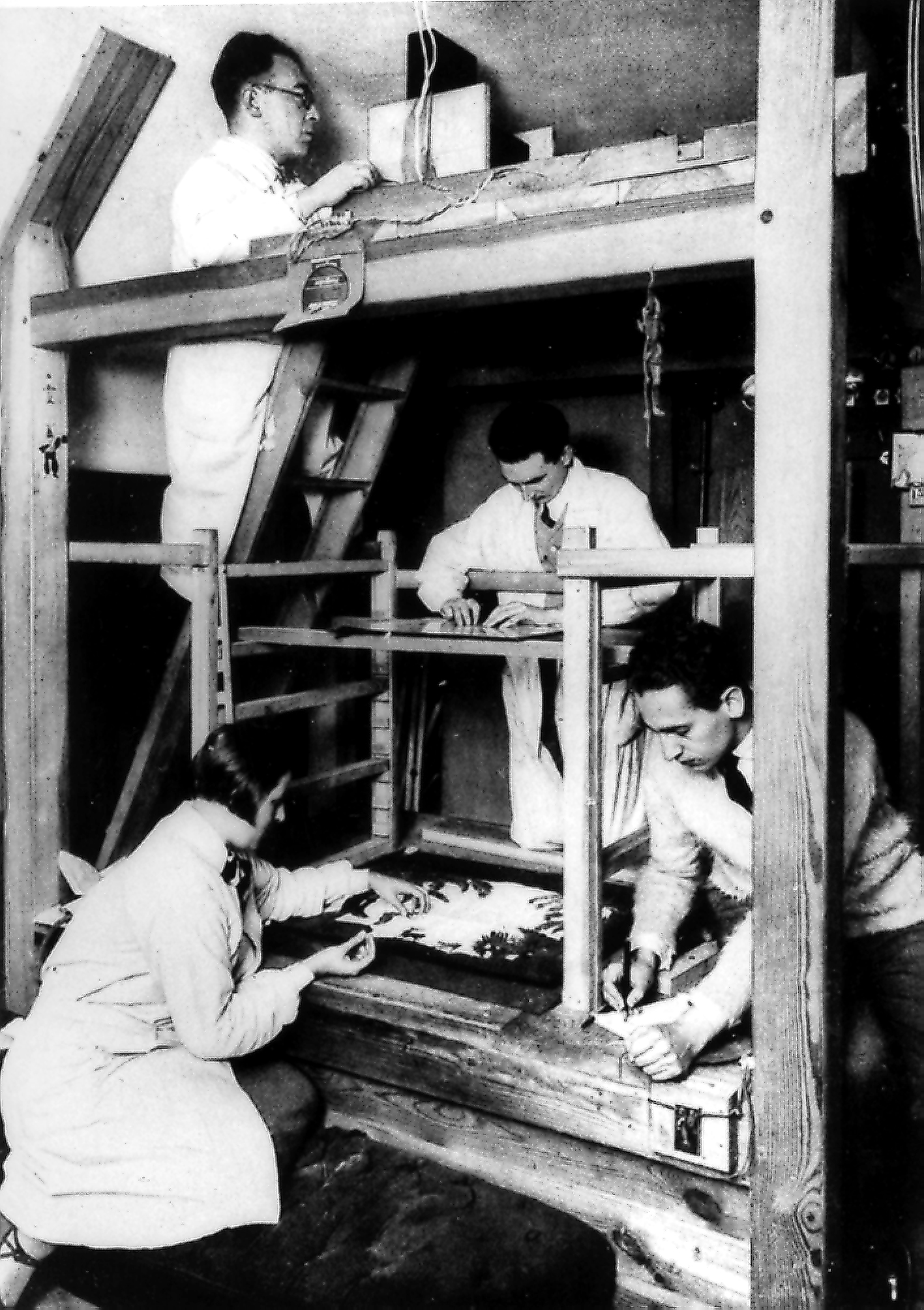
Lotte Reiniger and husband Carl Koch, with assistants Walter Türck and Alexander Kardan, probably 1920s

An early form of the multiplane camera was developed by Lotte Reiniger and her husband Carl Koch, for her animated feature The Adventures of Prince Achmed (1926). Reiniger had long experimented with Chinese shadow puppetry and its methods of suggesting depth by layering shallow, flat planes with colorful backgrounds and backlit action. Her novel design, dating to 1923, used multiple layers of glass to create added depth in the figure-ground relationships, and her camera was at a fixed position above the artwork. Berthold Bartosch, who worked with Reiniger, used a similar setup in his film L'Idee (1932).

In the 1930s, others began improving on Reiniger's design and techniques, seeking to add to the parallax illusion to create a further dimensional effect, as well as traveling shots moving through space, along with panning displaying layers or planes moving in perspective parallax. In 1933, having separated from Walt Disney Studios temporarily to run his own studio, animator/director Ub Iwerks developed a more advanced multiplane design, partly from salvaged parts from an old Chevrolet automobile. His camera was used in a number of the Iwerks Studio's Willie Whopper and Comicolor cartoons of the mid-1930s.

Sketch of a computer-controlled, four-plane multiplane camera, showing the glass-covered planes and the different motions.

Demonstration of the multiplane effect using three planes.

The technicians at Fleischer Studios created a distantly related device, called the Stereoptical Camera or Setback, in 1934. Their apparatus used three-dimensional miniature sets built to the scale of the animation artwork. The animation cels were placed within the setup so that various objects could pass in front of and behind them, and the entire scene was shot using a horizontal camera. The Tabletop process was used to create distinctive results in Fleischer's Betty Boop, Popeye the Sailor, and Color Classics cartoons.

An advanced multiplane camera was developed by William Garity for the Disney Studios to be used in the production of Snow White and the Seven Dwarfs. The camera was completed in early 1937 and tested in a Silly Symphony called The Old Mill, which won the 1937 Academy Award for Animated Short Film. Link to Garity's Multiplane patent :

Disney's multiplane camera, which used up to seven layers of artwork (painted in oils on glass) shot under a vertical and moveable camera set for successive frame Technicolor, allowed for more sophisticated uses than the Iwerks or Fleischer versions. A camera crew of up to a dozen technicians might be required to operate and advance each of the planes. The senior Disney executive Card Walker rose in the company from the multiplane camera department in the late 1930s. Occasionally the studio used another camera, operating horizontally along tracks laid on a studio floor to allow wider movements (e.g. establishing shot of Pinocchio's village) or extremely long tracking or complicated dissolve shots (notably the Ave Maria forest sequence). The multiplane was featured prominently in Disney films such as Pinocchio, Fantasia, Bambi, The Adventures of Ichabod and Mr. Toad, Cinderella, Alice in Wonderland, Peter Pan, Sleeping Beauty and The Jungle Book. The camera would be used more rarely in later movies, like The Fox and the Hound, which contains just a single multiplane shot.

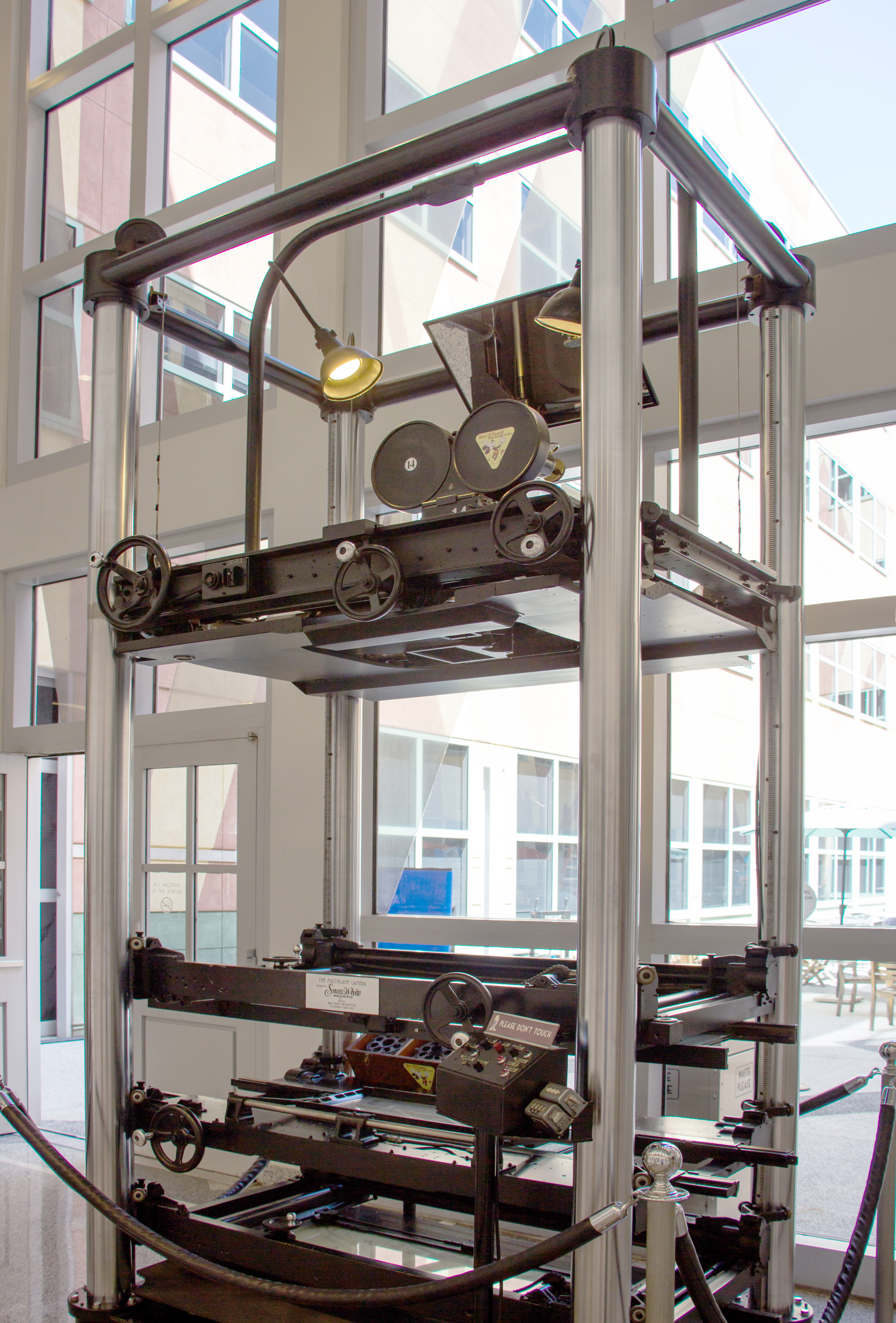
The 1937 multiplane camera developed by Walt Disney Studios

The Little Mermaid was the final Disney film to use a multiplane camera, though the work was done by an outside facility as Disney's cameras were not functional at the time. The process was made obsolete by the implementation of a "digital multiplane camera" feature in the digital CAPS process used for subsequent Disney films and in other computer animation systems.

Three original Disney multiplane cameras survive: the first at The Walt Disney Studios in Burbank, California, the second at the Walt Disney Family Museum in San Francisco, and the third in the Art of Disney Animation exhibition at Walt Disney Studios Park in Disneyland Paris.

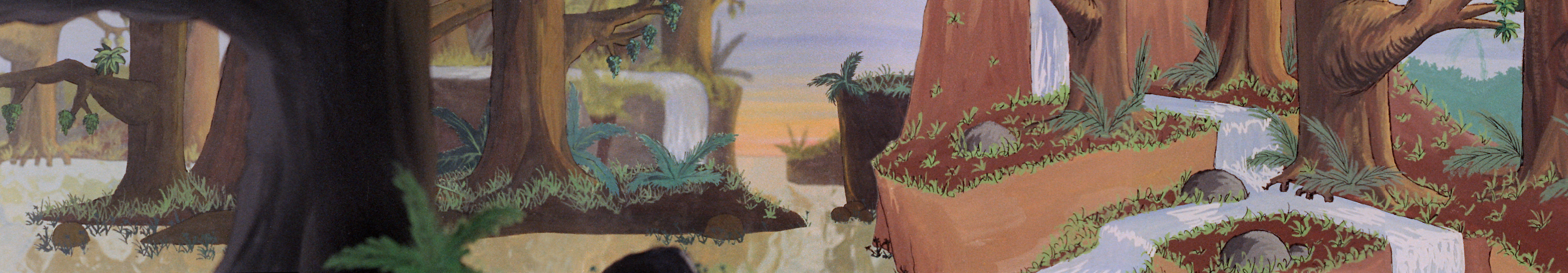
A 4-plane Multiplane background. The lowest plane, furthest from the camera, is only a rendering of a water surface. The plane above it contains (in addition to a cliff with a waterfall) a moving distortion glass, giving a ripple effect to the water. Note how the plane closest to the camera (dark tree in foreground at left) is strongly out of focus. The second plane from top contains a long background, continuing to the right.

== Impact ==
Before the multiplane camera, animators found it difficult to create a convincing tracking shot that kept perspective (for instance, a moon of constant size in distant background) by using traditional animation methods. Furthermore, the act of animating the forward motion was becoming increasingly costly and time-consuming. The multiplane camera answered this problem by creating a realistic sense of three dimensional depth in a cartoon setting.

The multiplane also made possible new and versatile types of in-camera special effects for animated films using, for example, 3D practical elements/mock-ups in foreground, filters and planar lighting, distortion glass and reflections, to achieve naturalistic moving water, flickering light and other subtle effects.

== See also ==
- Parallax scrolling
