= Kurt Wolff (publisher) =

German publisher, founder of Kurt Wolff Verlag (1887-1963)

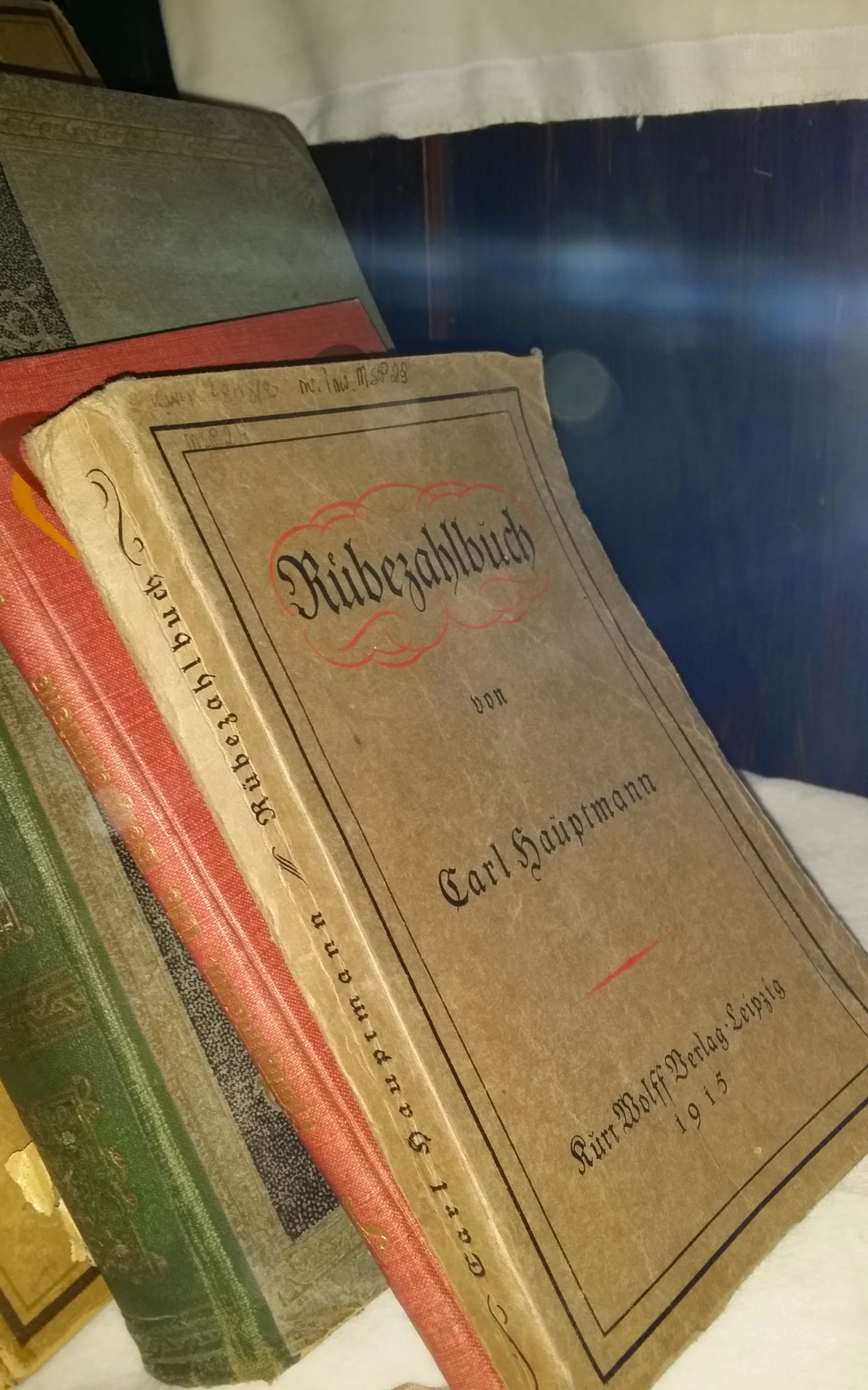
Some books published by Kurt Wolff

Kurt Wolff (3 March 1887 – 21 October 1963) was a German publisher, editor, writer, and journalist.

Wolff was born in Bonn, Rhenish Prussia; his mother came from a Jewish-German family. He married Elisabeth Karoline Clara Merck (1890–1970), of the Darmstadt pharmaceuticals firm, in 1909. Together with Ernst Rowohlt, Wolff began to work in publishing in Leipzig in 1908. He was the first to promote and publish Franz Kafka and Franz Werfel but declined to publish the works of Axel Munthe. Wolff's close contact with other writers in Prague and his support for unknown, but talented, writers helped him to further the careers of Kafka's friends, Max Brod and Felix Weltsch, who were better known in Berlin and Germany.

In 1929, Wolff published the photography book Face of Our Time by August Sander.

In 1941 Wolff and his second wife, Helen Mosel, left Germany and emigrated to Paris, London, Montagnola, St. Tropez, Nice, and finally with the assistance of Varian Fry, to New York City. Later in Munich, Florence, and the United States, Wolff developed several publishing houses. In the U.S., he and Helen founded Pantheon Books in 1942, which became well known. They later ran the Helen and Kurt Wolff Books imprint at Harcourt Brace Jovanovich. Wolff settled in Switzerland in the 1950s. He died after a driving accident and is buried with Helen in Marbach, Germany.

The Helen and Kurt Wolff Translator's Prize is named in honor of him and his wife. His son, Christian Wolff, is a renowned avant-garde musician. His grandson Alexander (son of Nicholas) wrote a family history, published in 2021 as Endpapers: A Family Story of Books, War, Escape, and Home.

== Literary archives ==
The Beinecke Rare Book and Manuscript Library at Yale University holds the Kurt Wolff Archive, 1907–38. The collection contains about 4,100 letters and manuscripts from the files of the Kurt Wolff Verlag from the years 1910–30. A portion of the Kurt Wolff Archive is currently available online.
