= Antti Herlin =

Finnish businessman

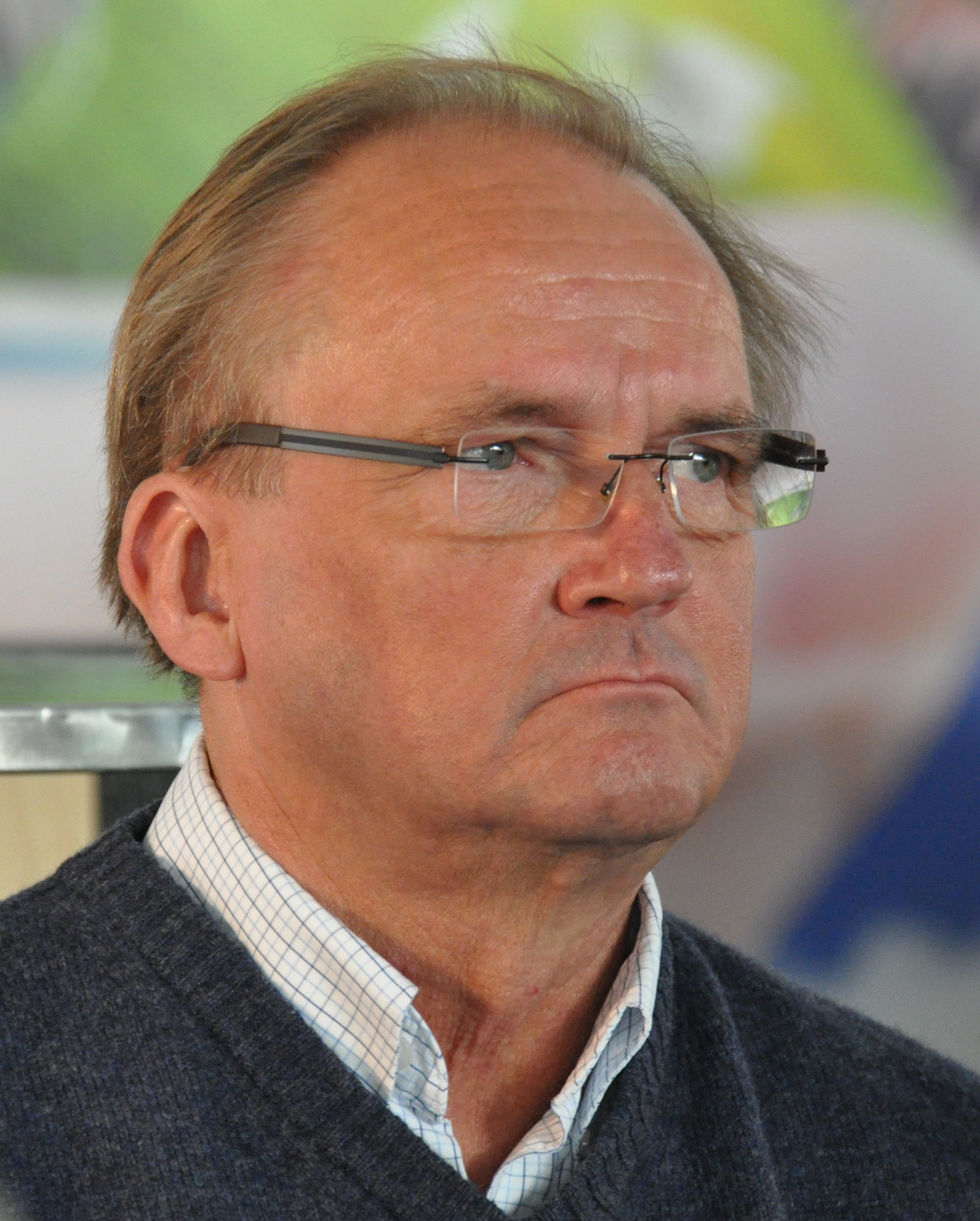
- Antti Herlin in 2013
- Born: 14 November 1956 (age 69); Kirkkonummi, Finland
- Education: National Technical University of Athens; Iowa State University
- Occupations: Chairman, KONE Corporation
- Parent: Pekka Herlin
- Relatives: Heikki H. Herlin (grandfather); Ilkka Herlin (brother)

Antti Herlin (born 14 November 1956) is a Finnish billionaire businessman and the chairman of the Finnish KONE Corporation, as well as the richest person in Finland – as of January 2025 Forbes reported his net worth as $4.1 billion, naming him the 819th richest person in the world. He is also the former chairman of the Confederation of Finnish Industries (Elinkeinoelämän Keskusliitto EK).

Herlin is the son of Pekka Herlin, the former chairman of KONE.

Herlin owns a farm in Kirkkonummi where he raises Hereford and Aberdeen Angus beef cattle.

== Positions ==
In addition to his duties at KONE, Herlin holds the following positions:

- Chairman of Sanoma Oyj since 2013

== Publicity ==
It was investigated if Herlin used inside information in his Kone and Partek stock investments in 2001-2002. The investigation found Herlin innocent. Herlin started his own investigation into who is responsible for the case becoming public in the media in 2005. The authorities accused by him could not be proved to have given any information.

== Investments ==
In 2005 the Herlin family made significant investments in the construction companies YIT and Lemminkäinen.

== Agriculture ==
Herlin received agricultural support from the state of €275,792 in 2012. State total support was €2.1 billion.
