= Ilkka Herlin =

Finnish business executive

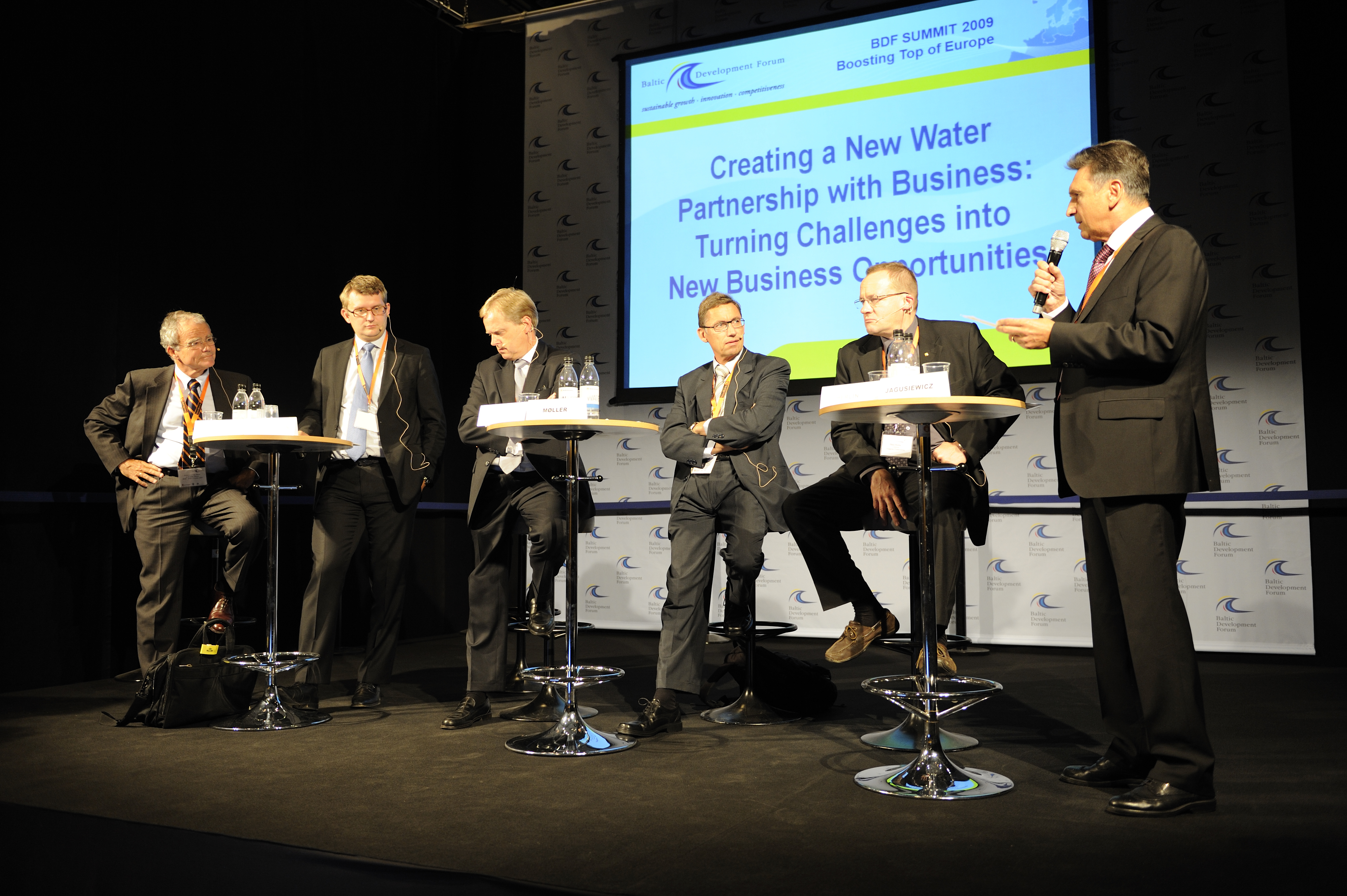
- Photo by Kai Thomas Engström.
- Born: 25 January 1959 (age 67); Helsinki, Finland
- Education: Doctor of Philosophy
- Alma mater: University of Helsinki
- Occupations: Chairman, Cargotec
- Spouse: married
- Children: 4
- Parent: Pekka Herlin
- Relatives: Heikki H. Herlin (grandfather); Antti Herlin (brother); Ilona Herlin (sister); Niklas Herlin (brother)

Ilkka Heikki Herlin (born 25 January 1959) is a Finnish billionaire, the chairman and one of the owners of Cargotec, and one of the owners of the elevator and escalator maker Kone.

His father Pekka Herlin died in 2003, and it was discovered that he had rewritten his will in 1999, leaving most of the elevator and escalator maker Kone to Ilkka's brother Antti Herlin. Ilkka and his siblings Ilona and Niklas were unhappy about not being informed, and the dispute finally ended in 2005. The Kone company was split, with Antti receiving a majority stake in its core elevator business. Ilkka and his siblings received a majority of Cargotec and a minority stake in the new Kone company. All four siblings became billionaires.

Herlin is married, with four children, and lives in Helsinki, Finland.
