= Robert McGregor =

Robert McGregor or MacGregor may refer to:

- Robert Roy MacGregor (1671–1734), Scottish folk hero and outlaw
- Robert MacGregor (engineer) (1873–1956), British engineer
- Robert McGregor (Australian politician) (1853–1931), English-born Australian politician
- Robert MacGregor (Australian politician) (1825–1883), Scottish-born Australian headmaster and politician
- Robert McGregor (pentathlete) (born 1972), Australian modern pentathlete
- Bob McGregor (born 1944), Scottish swimmer
- Robert Henry McGregor (1886–1965), Canadian parliamentarian
- Robert McGregor (painter) (1847–1922), Scottish painter
- Robert M. McGregor (1876–1924), wholesale grocer, lumber merchant and political figure in Nova Scotia, Canada
- Rob Roy McGregor (admiral) (1907-2000), US Navy Rear Admiral, World War II Submarine Commander

== See also ==
- John MacGregor (sportsman), nicknamed Rob Roy, British explorer and pioneer of recreational and sport canoeing
