= Lemminkäinen (disambiguation) =

Lemminkäinen is a mythical hero of the Finnish Kalevala.

Lemminkäinen may also refer to:

- Lemminkäinen Suite, a composition by Jean Sibelius based on the hero
- Lemminkäinen Group, a Finnish construction company
- Klaipėdos Lemminkainen, women basketball club in Lithuania
