= YIT =

Finnish construction company

YIT Oyj
- Type: Julkinen osakeyhtiö
- Traded as: Nasdaq Helsinki: YIT
- Industry: Construction, services
- Founded: 1912
- Headquarters: Helsinki, Finland
- Key people: Heikki Vuorenmaa (President and CEO, Jyri Luomakoski (Chairman)
- Products: construction of housing, business premises and infrastructure
- Revenue: €2.2 billion (2023)
- Net income: €41.0 million (2023)
- Number of employees: ~4 300 (2024)
- Website: www.yitgroup.com

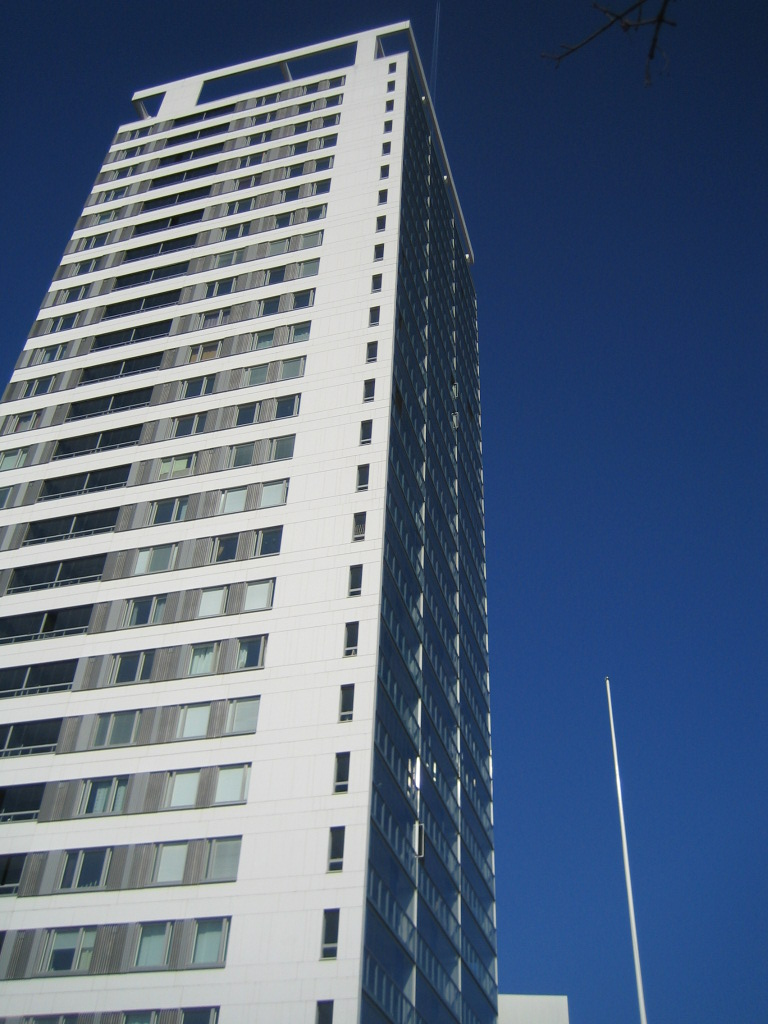
The Cirrus apartment block, Finland's tallest high-rise building, constructed by YIT between 2004 and 2007.

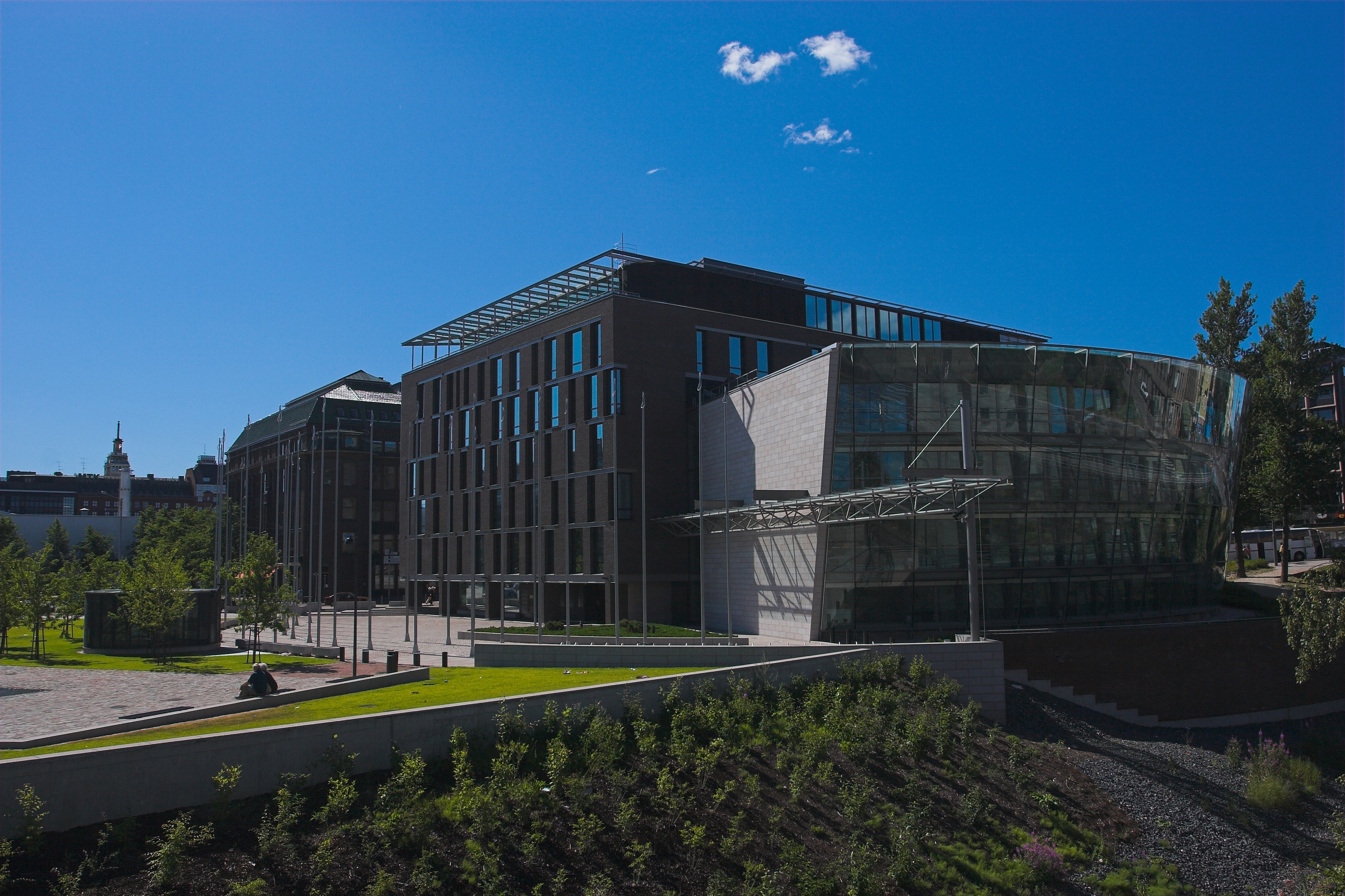
The extension to the Eduskuntatalo, of which YIT was the lead contractor.

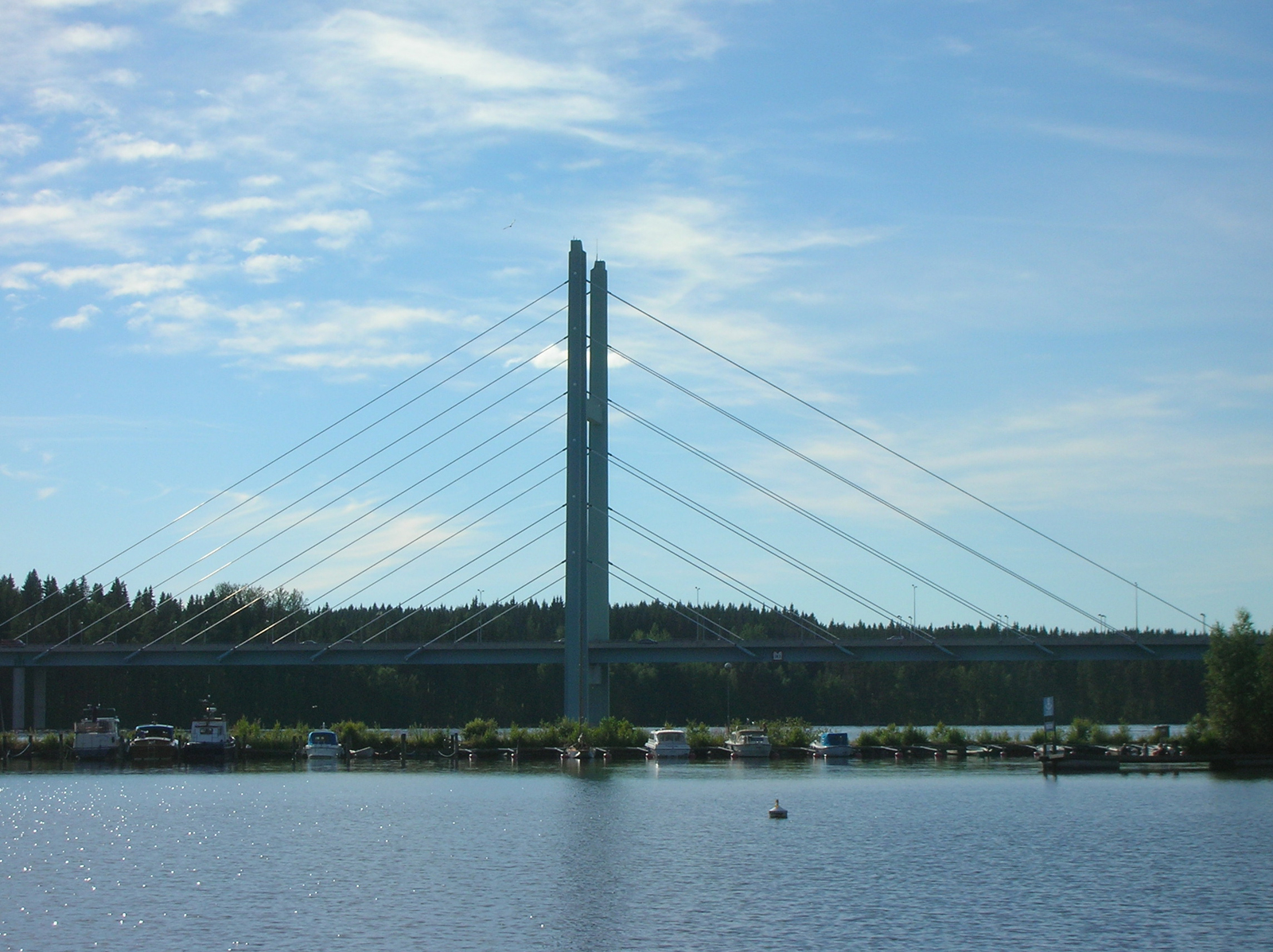
The Tähtiniemi Bridge in Heinola, of which YIT was the lead contractor.

YIT Oyj is the largest Finnish and a significant North European construction company. YIT is headquartered in Helsinki and its stock is listed on Nasdaq Helsinki Oy. YIT develops and builds apartments, business premises and entire areas. YIT is also specialised in demanding infrastructure construction and paving. YIT operates in 8 countries: Finland, Sweden, the Baltic States, the Czech Republic, Slovakia and Poland.

== History ==
The origins of YIT can be traced back to 1912, when Sweden's General Engineering Company (Swedish: Allmänna Ingeniörsbyrån) established a subsidiary in Finland, initially to operate in the water supply sector. The Finnish translation of the group's title, Yleinen Insinööritoimisto, is the source of the name YIT. The first project undertaken by the new company was the construction of a water tower in Porvoo. The firm's field of operation was gradually broadened over the following decades, but it was not until the 1970s that the company moved beyond the civil engineering sector into construction of buildings (including residential property) and industrial works.

In September 1987, Yleinen Insinööritoimisto merged with rival Finnish contractor Perusyhtymä Oy, creating YIT-Yhtymä (YIT Corporation). Since the merger, YIT's growth into new sectors has been aided by several acquisitions: in 1995, the piping design and maintenance specialist Oy Huber Ab was acquired, the same year that the company's shares were listed on the Helsinki Stock Exchange, and the Swedish pipeline installation and maintenance firm Calor AB and its Finnish subsidiary were purchased in 2001.

These additions assisted a wider move into the industrial upkeep and maintenance market. Primatel, the network construction and maintenance arm of the telecommunications firm Sonera, was added in 2002, and a year later the building systems concerns of ABB in Russia and the Nordic and Baltic regions were acquired, further increasing YIT's presence in the service sector. In 2008 and 2010 YIT has continued expanding its operations into Central Europe.

In March 2022, YIT quit all activities, such as investments and construction, in Russia because of 2022 Russian invasion of Ukraine.

== Current activities ==
YIT's recent acquisitions have seen the company increase markedly in size - both the company's revenue and workforce more than trebled in the ten years to 2007, making YIT the largest construction company in Finland and the largest supplier of building systems services in the Nordic region by sales.

This growth is also reflected in the scope of YIT's business: long-term servicing and maintenance contracts for items such as steam boilers, piping, heating, plumbing and electricity networks and water treatment plants now account for over a quarter of annual revenues. The Construction Services division, building homes, water and waste treatment plants and infrastructure ranging from railway stations to golf courses remains the group's largest source of revenue as of the end of 2006.

In June 2017, the company announced its intention to acquire rival Lemminkäinen for €632 million (£553.6 million) in an all-share deal representing a 40% premium over Lemminkainen's current share price. The new YIT was born when over 100-year-old YIT Corporation and Lemminkäinen Corporation merged on February 1, 2018.

=== Notable projects ===
YIT was the main contractor for the Finnish Parliament building, the Pikkuparlamentti (English: Little Parliament), which was inaugurated in 2004. It was also responsible for the construction of the Cirrus apartment building in Vuosaari, East Helsinki, which was completed in 2007. Cirrus is currently the second tallest high-rise building in Finland. Other major projects built by the company include the Helsinki Fair Centre and the Töölö opera house, home of the Finnish National Opera.

== Ownership ==
Ehrnrooth family is the biggest owner of the construction company YIT, 12.1% in the end of January 2012.

== Critics ==
In Bani Walid in Libya, YIT constructed in silence a military factory in 1983. Company changed its name from Perusyhtymä to YIT in 1987. 40 residents made complaints of ammonia observed in YIT residential constructions in St. Petersburg in September 2011. Russians add ammonia to concrete in the winter construction.

=== Corruption in construction ===
YIT was suspected of bribes for the public construction office of Helsinki in May 2012. Six people were arrested in May 2012 by order of Helsinki District Court in the investigation of corruption in Helsinki city building contracts. The advantage may have been half a million euros from several years. The investigation is on-going. In July 2014 according to leading Finnish newspaper Helsingin Sanomat YIT is more connected than previously expected in the bribery investigation of Helsinki construction during 2003–2011. YIT is suspected of involvement in the salaries without taxes and grey accountings.

== Other ==
YIT demanded €20,000 sanctions for silence from an elderly couple in Espoo in the conflict of construction in 2011.
