= Kone =

Finnish elevator manufacturer and engineering company

Kone Corporation

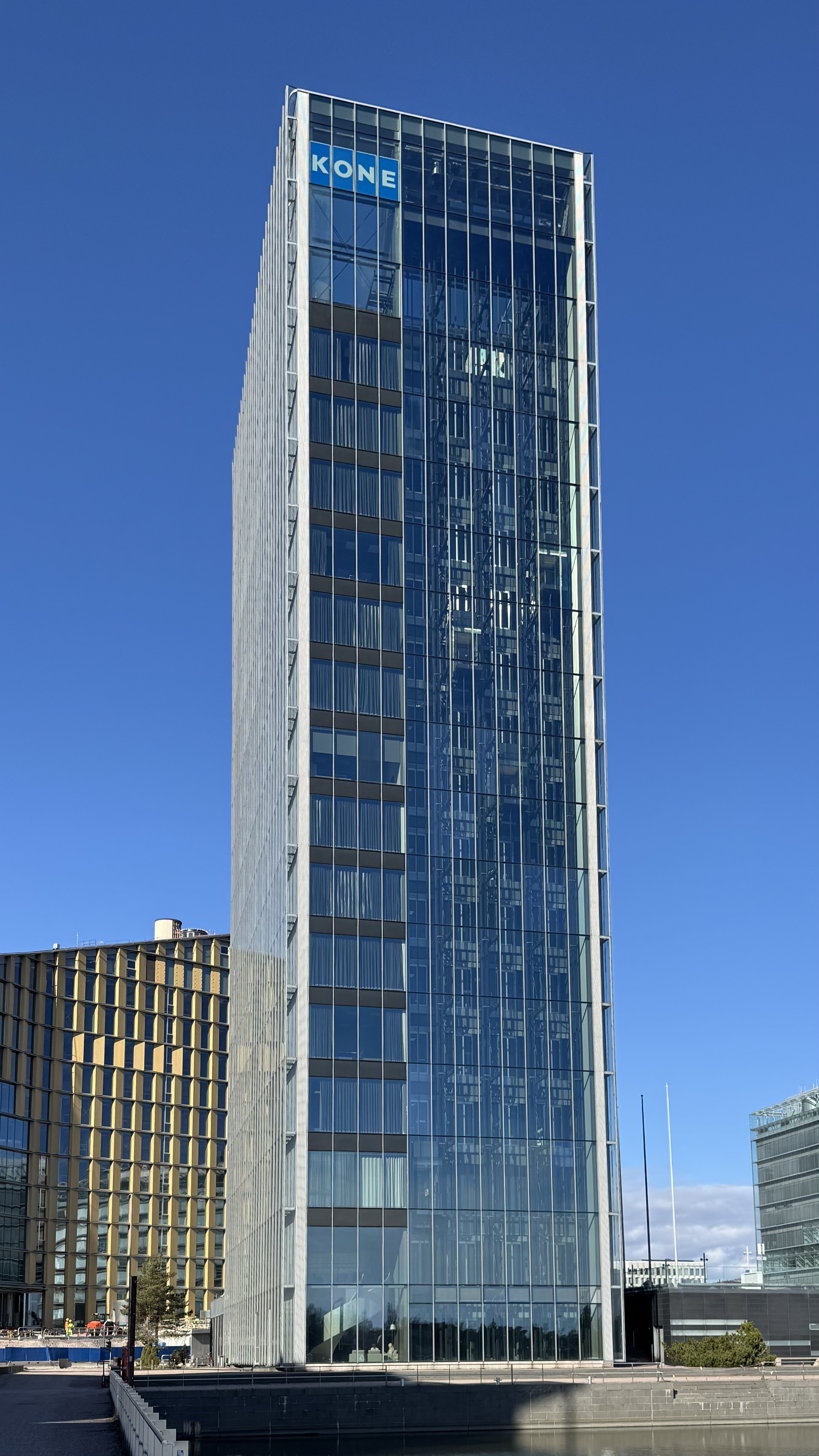
- Kone Building in Keilaniemi, Espoo
- Native name: Kone Oyj (Finnish)
- Type: Public
- Traded as: Nasdaq Helsinki: KNEBV
- Industry: Engineering and service
- Founded: 27 October 1910; 115 years ago
- Headquarters: Espoo, Finland
- Area served: Worldwide except Korea, Japan, Russia, Belarus and most of Latin America
- Key people: Antti Herlin (Chairman); Philippe Delorme (President and CEO)
- Products: Elevators, escalators, automatic building doors
- Revenue: ▲€11.245 billion (2025)
- Operating income: ▲€1.336 billion (2025)
- Net income: ▲€0.992 billion (2025)
- Total assets: ▲€9.72 billion (2021)
- Total equity: ▲€3.20 billion (2021)
- Owner: Herlin family through Security Trading Oy (22% equity, 62% voting power)
- Number of employees: Over 60,000 (2025)
- Website: kone.com

Kone Oyj (Finnish pronunciation: [ˈkone]; officially known as KONE and trading as KONE Corporation) is a Finnish multinational elevator engineering company employing over 60,000 personnel across 60 countries worldwide. It was founded in 1910 and is headquartered in Espoo, Finland. In addition, Kone builds and services moving walkways (referred to by the company as autowalks), automatic doors and gates, escalators, and lifts. In the Finnish language, Kone means "machine".

Since 1924, Kone has been controlled by the Herlin family. Harald Herlin purchased the company in 1924 and served as its chairman until 1941. Afterward, his son, Heikki H. Herlin, took over his father's post from 1941–1987. In 1954, Pekka Herlin joined Kone and succeeded his father as president in 1964. Since 2003, Antti Herlin, the son of Pekka Herlin, has been its chairman. As of December 2019, Antti Herlin controls 62% of the voting rights and 22% of the shares of the company, which is listed on Nasdaq Helsinki.

== History ==
=== 1910–1964 ===
Kone (then known as Osakeyhtiö Kone Aktiebolag) was founded in 1910 as a subsidiary of Gottfr. Strömberg Oy. Strömberg's license to import Graham Brother's elevators was transferred to the new company. Kone sold just a few units before terminating the licensing agreement in 1917. Kone, then a company with only 50 employees, started to make and install its elevators in 1918. Six years later, in 1924, entrepreneur Harald Herlin bought Kone from Strömberg and became the new chairman of the company's board of directors. His son, Heikki H. Herlin, joined the company and was appointed technical director in 1928. His office was located in a former margarine factory on Haapaniemi Street in Helsinki, which Kone had bought and converted into an elevator production facility the previous year. Heikki H. Herlin took over as Kone’s president in 1932. Kone’s first foreign subsidiary, AB Kone Hissar of Sweden, was established in 1957.

After World War II, Kone was called upon by the Finnish government to contribute elevators, electric hoists, and cranes to the war reparations being paid to the Soviet Union. This program forced Kone to expand its capacity, rationalize production processes and learn to meet demanding manufacturing schedules. In the 1950s, Kone introduced its first group controls, automatic doors, and hydraulic elevators. Heikki H. Herlin turned over the president's duties in 1964 to his son, Pekka, who had served as an administrative director since 1958.

=== 1965–1998 ===
Kone opened an elevator factory in 1966 in Hyvinkää, Finland. The following year Kone was listed on the Helsinki Exchanges and started its international expansion through the acquisition of Sweden's Asea-Graham and its Norwegian and Danish affiliates. Numerous acquisitions followed during the 1970s and 1980s, with only the most significant being listed here. The acquisitions of companies larger and older than Kone itself brought Kone respectability and lifted the company to a position of market prominence. Eventually, Kone further expanded its business scope. The company became one of the world's largest manufacturers of hoists and cranes, as well as a producer of high-tech electronic equipment for hospitals and laboratories.

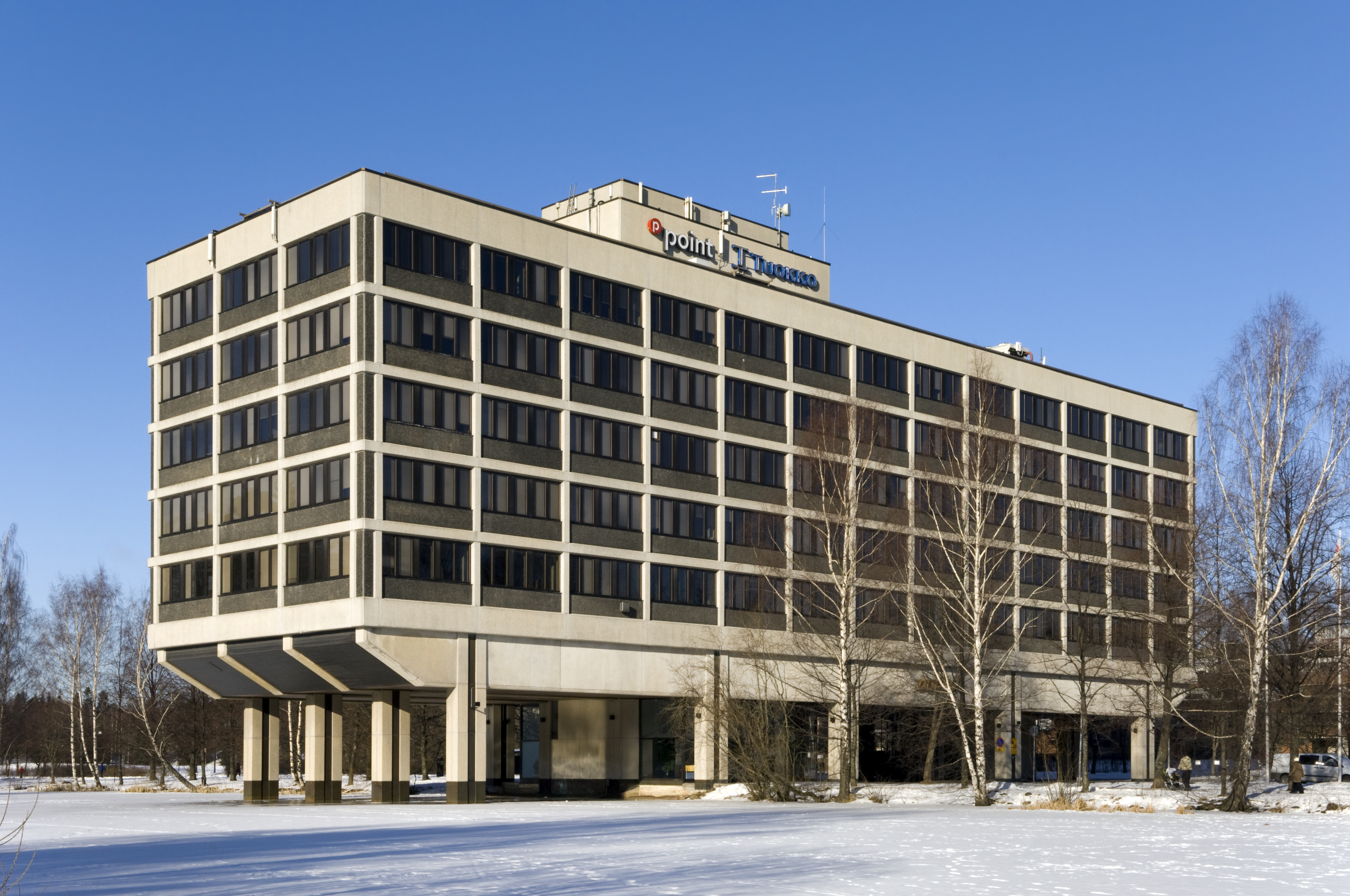
The former Kone corporate offices in Munkkiniemi, Helsinki

In 1981, Kone entered the American elevator market with the acquisition of New York City-based Armor Elevator Company, which it continued to operate independently as a wholly owned subsidiary. The company acquired Navire Cargo Gear in 1982 and International MacGregor, makers of shipboard cargo access equipment. Wood-handling systems and equipment for pulp and paper mills, hydraulic piping systems, mining equipment, conveyors, and specialized steel components were manufactured at Kone's steel foundry. In 1987, after 60 years as a member of Kone's board of directors and 46 years as its chairman, Heikki H. Herlin retired. Prevented by Finnish law from serving simultaneously as president and board chairman, Pekka Herlin ceded the presidency to Matti Matinpalo, the first non-Herlin to occupy the position in 55 years, and continued as chairman of the board.

Kone sold its shipboard cargo handling business in 1993, as well as its crane (Konecranes), wood handling, and piping systems businesses in 1994, and finally the steel foundry and electronic medical instruments divisions in 1995. Only its elevators, escalators, and automatic door branches remained. Kone acquired the Montgomery Elevator Company of the U.S. in 1994. Soon afterwards, the Kone Corporation purchased a majority of the outstanding shares of O&K Rolltreppen GmbH of Germany, a supplier of escalators and autowalks. In 1998, the company made a $29 million (US) investment in the construction of an elevator and escalator factory in Kunshan, China.

In 1996, Antti Herlin, the great-grandson of the company's founder, was appointed Kone CEO and deputy chairman of the board of the company that he had now inherited. The company introduced new technology, such as the Kone EcoDisc hoisting machine and the Kone MonoSpace elevator technology concept, in 1996. Kone was one of the first to introduce machine-room-less (MRL) construction in elevators. Kone's MRL designs significantly reduced the size of elevator machinery and its lift mechanism by using permanent-magnet electric motors (PMM). The use of these mechanisms enabled all of the elevator's equipment and its inner workings to be confined to the space above the elevator shaft, known as the hoistway overhead, instead of needing an entire room dedicated to machinery. At the beginning of the 21st Century, due to the apparent benefits of Kone's pioneering elevator systems, rival companies began competitively marketing machine-room-less elevators of their own.

=== 1999–2021 ===
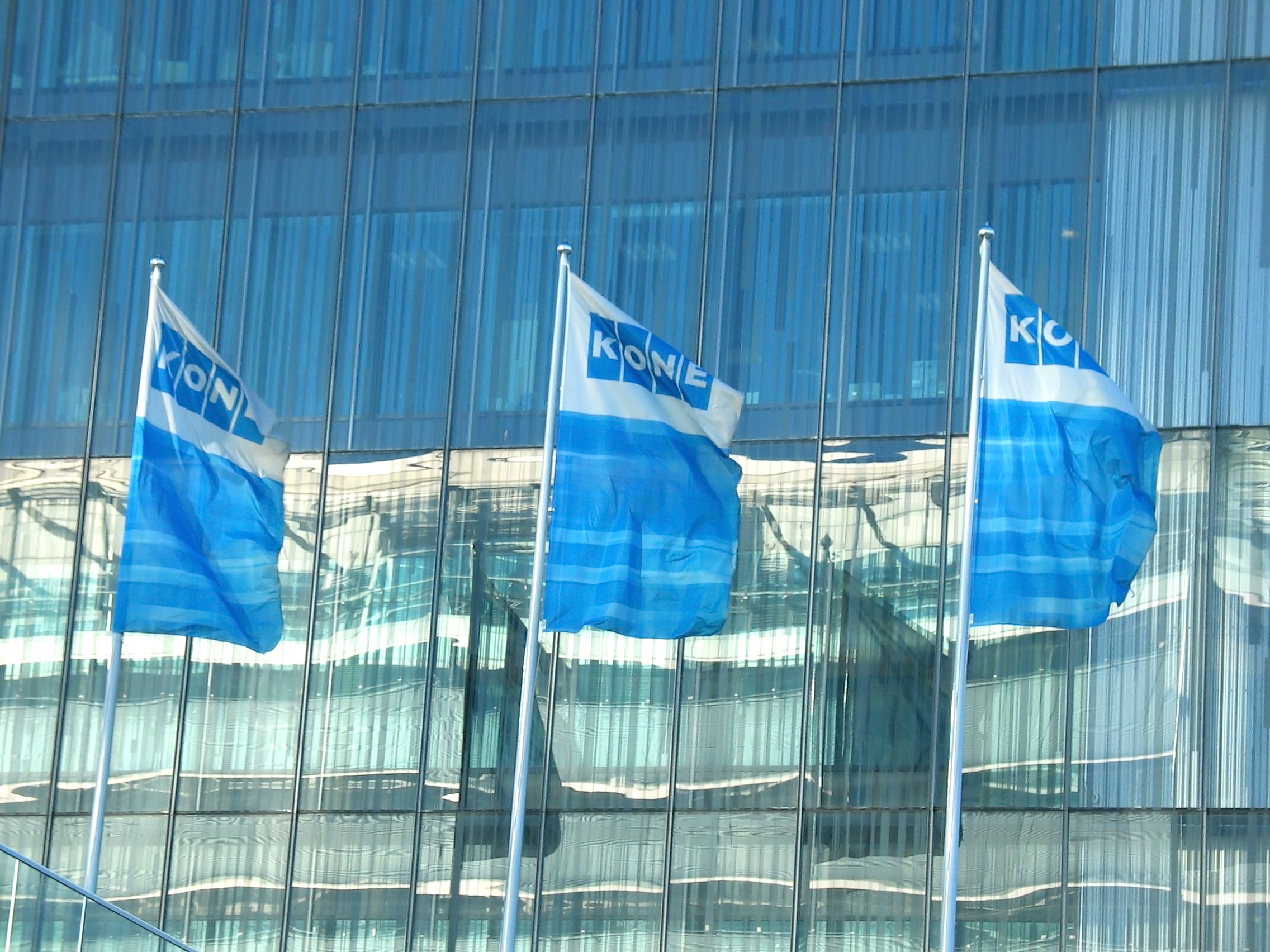
Flags at Kone corporate headquarters, built in 2001 in Keilaniemi, Espoo, Finland

Kone's chairman of the board, Pekka Herlin, died on April 4, 2003, after a long illness. Antti Herlin was subsequently appointed the new chairman of the board in June 2003. Matti Alahuhta, a former executive vice president at Nokia Corporation, previously serving as the president of Nokia Mobile Phones, was later chosen to fill Herlin's vacant position as the acting president of the Kone Corporation. He has held the position since 2005 and officially became the firm's president and CEO in 2006. In April 2014, Alahuhta stepped down, and Kone's CFO at the time, Henrik Ehrnrooth, was appointed Alahuhta's successor.

In 2000, Kone sold off the American factory in Winfield, KS, to Wittur. This was done despite repeated assurances by Kone management to its employees that the factory was not for sale.

In 2002, Kone acquired Partek, a Finnish industrial engineering company with net sales equal to Kone's. Partek's business areas specialized in container handling, load handling, forest machinery, and tractors. The tractors were manufactured under the Valtra brand. The Kone Materials Handling division thus comprised these Partek business areas.

In 2003, Kone decided to concentrate on Container Handling and Load Handling, and the tractor and forest machine businesses were sold. The Valtra tractor business was sold to AGCO, a worldwide agricultural manufacturer. As the structure of Kone Materials Handling changed significantly, the name Kone Cargotec was introduced in January 2004. Its business areas were Kalmar (container handling) and HIAB (load handling).

At the end of 2004, Kone Cargotec acquired MacGregor, a global marine cargo-flow service provider.

In August 2004, the Kone Board of Directors presented a plan to split the company into two separately listed companies on the Helsinki Stock Exchange in June 2005. One company would comprise Kone's existing elevator, escalator and building door service business and continue to operate under the name Kone Corporation. The other company would comprise Kone Cargotec's business area and operate under the name Cargotec Corporation. The Extraordinary Shareholders' Meeting in December 2004 approved the Demerger Plan. The demerger was completed in June 2005.

In September 2007, it was announced that Kone was proposing to lease several floors of a new riverfront tower to be built on Bass Street Landing, which is part of the Moline Riverfront.

Also in 2007, it was announced that Kone had received part of what was then the largest fine ever handed out by the European Commission for local anti-competitive practices in the elevator and escalator markets in Belgium, Germany, Luxembourg, and the Netherlands relating to the time before mid-2004. The commission stated that it could only prove its case back to 1995, although evidence allegedly suggested that the abuse had started much earlier.) Competitors ThyssenKrupp, Schindler Group, Otis Elevator Co., and Mitsubishi Elevator Europe were also given similar fines. Kone appealed against the size of the fine. In total, the industry received a €992 million fine for cartel activity across Belgium, Germany, Luxembourg, and the Netherlands.

In 2007, Kone announced that it would stop the production of hydraulic elevators, replacing them with the EcoSpace MRL elevators, due to the hydraulic elevators' inefficient energy consumption, contamination concerns regarding the use of hydraulic oil and buried cylinders, and other environmental concerns. Therefore, Kone has become the first major brand elevator company to make only traction elevators.

=== Alliances and acquisitions ===
- 1969 – Kone enters Spain by buying shares of Ascensores Eguren. Afterwards they create Eguren-KONE S.A.
- 1981 – Kone enters the United States market by acquiring Armor Elevator Co.
- 1985 – Kone acquires the Canadian division of Montgomery Elevator.
- 1989 – Kone acquires full ownership of Elevators Pty Ltd, operating in Australia and New Zealand. Kone had held a 10% stake since 1986.
- 1994 – Kone's ownership of Montgomery in Canada opens an alliance with Montgomery in the U.S. that led to the full acquisition of Montgomery altogether. After working with Montgomery to produce elevator and escalator products for 5 years, the company was fully integrated into Kone US.
- 1995 – An alliance was formed as Kone and MacGregor worked together to create elevators for handling passenger traffic on modern cruise ships.
- 1998 – Kone's alliance was initiated with Toshiba (now divided into Toshiba Elevator And Building Systems Corp.) of Japan.
- 2001 – Kone and Toshiba signed a historic agreement to exchange shares and extend Toshiba's license to market elevators based on Kone EcoDisc technology.
- 2002 – Kone acquires the industrial engineering company Partek.
- 2007 – Kone announces they will no longer make hydraulic elevators.
- 2009 – Kone acquires Fairway Elevator Company in Philadelphia to enter the modernization market in that area.
- 2011 – Kone builds a new headquarters in the United States with the name of The Kone Centre in Moline, Illinois, the present headquarters is also located there.
- 2011 – Kone acquires Long Elevator Company, headquartered in Springfield, IL, serving St. Louis, Peoria, Chicago, and NW Indiana.
- 2013 – Kone acquired its Israeli distributor Isralift.
- 2014 – Kone acquired the elevator and escalator business of Marryat & Scott (Kenya) Ltd. and Marryats East Africa Limited, its authorized distributors in East and Central Africa.
- 2017 – Kone acquired the UK elevator company 21st Century Lifts. The business operations were merged with Kone's UK operations a short time later.
- 2026 – Kone announced that it had agreed to acquire German competitor TK Elevator (TKE) in a cash-and-stock transaction valued at $34.4 billion. If completed, the deal would create the world’s largest elevator manufacturer.

=== Cartel fine ===
The European Union (EU) gave a fine of €992 million (US$1.3bn; £666.8m) on four lift and escalator manufacturers for price-fixing between 1995 and 2004. Germany's ThyssenKrupp, US-owned Otis Elevator Company, Kone of Finland, and Swiss firm Schindler were fined for taking part in a market-rigging cartel.

== Awards and rankings ==
In 2013, Kone was awarded "Good Design" awards for its design offering, functional elevator signalization series, and new elevator car design. This is the third time Kone has received this acknowledgement.

=== Forbes list of the world's most innovative companies ===
In 2014, Kone was ranked 42nd in the world by the business magazine Forbes. This was the fourth consecutive year Kone was recognized in this ranking. Out of all European companies listed in 2014, Kone was ranked sixth, and it was the only elevator and escalator company featured on Forbes' list. In 2018, Kone was 59th on Forbes' list.

=== 2014 Newsweek Green Rankings ===
In 2014, Kone was ranked the world's 12th greenest company by the American magazine Newsweek. Released by Newsweek and its research partner corporate Knights Capital, they evaluate the world's largest publicly traded companies using eight metrics that collectively provide a transparent measurement of overall corporate environmental performance. In the list, Kone is the only top 50 company representing the elevator and escalator industry.

== Products and trademarks ==
=== Kone UltraRope ===
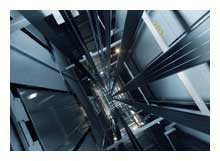
Kone UltraRope in elevator shaft

In June 2013, the company launched a new high-rise elevator technology, called Kone UltraRope, which enables future elevator travel heights of up to one kilometer due to its low weight. The product is light due to its carbon-fiber tape core manufactured in pultrusion by French company Epsilon Composite and a high-friction coating added by Austrian company Faigle Kunststoffe. Because of these qualities, elevator energy consumption in high-rise buildings can be cut significantly. Jeddah Tower in Saudi Arabia (with a height of 1,000 meters) which is planned to open in 2028 will feature Kone UltraRope. The elevator in Jeddah Tower will be a height of 660 meters.

One additional benefit of UltraRope is that it has a higher resonance frequency than steel cable. This reduces the cable's sway in tall buildings and can minimize damage from the cable to itself and the elevator shaft.

=== Kone EcoDisc motor ===
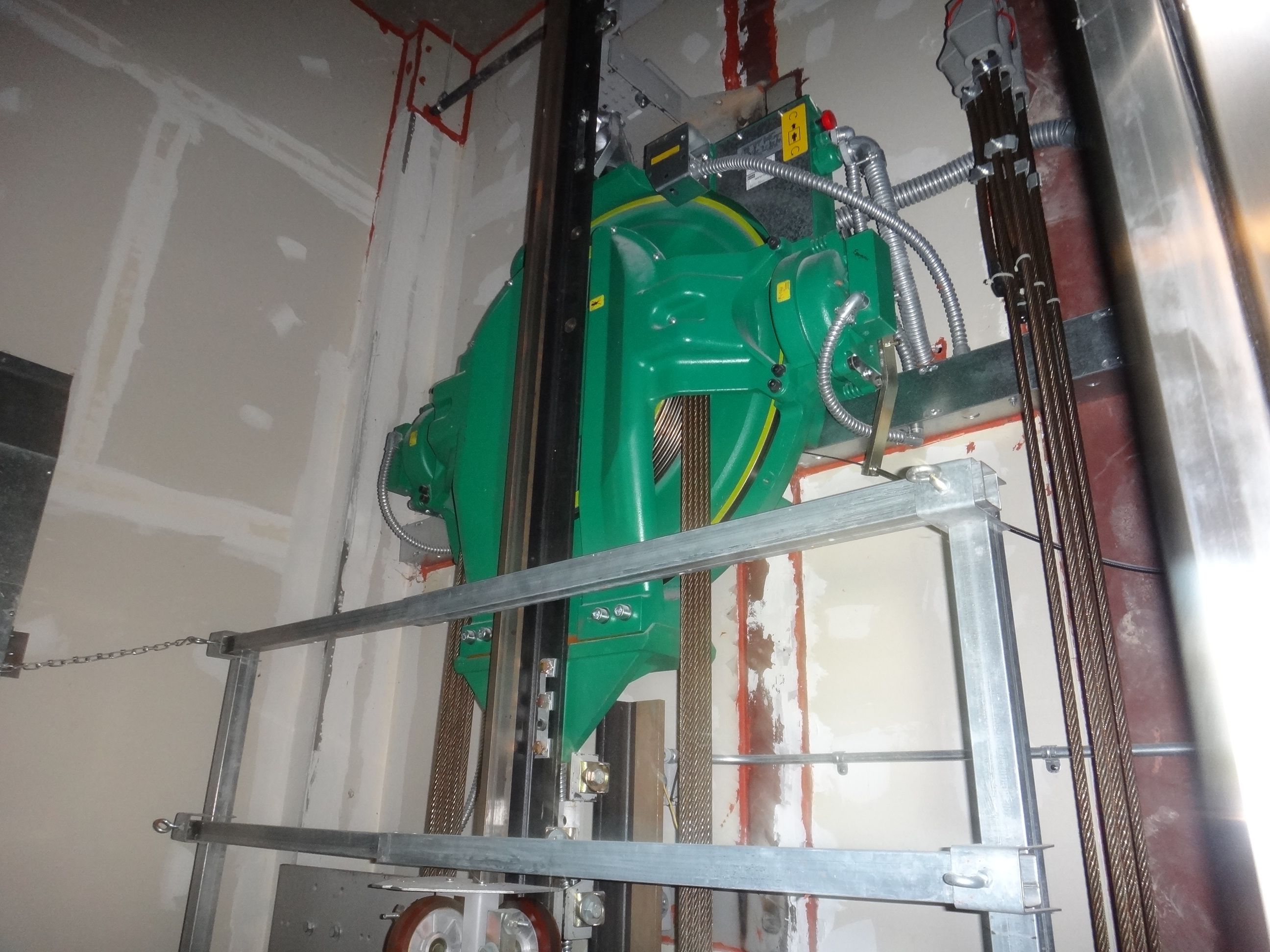
Kone EcoDisc motor

The 'Kone EcoDisc motor', used for hoisting, reduces the amount of energy lost as heat and circulates air through the motor, reducing its temperature. The motor control system and brakes make the elevator ride quieter, and the design frees up space. It is typically installed as an MRL (Machine-Room-Less) motor that is placed at the top of an elevator shaft. The fastest speed that Kone makes the EcoDisc (as an MRL motor) is 3.5 m/s. However, for a faster speed (e.g. 4 m/s), the machine needs to be installed in a machine room.

=== Kone Access Turnstiles ===
The 'Kone Access Turnstiles', used for the fast and efficient movement for the flow of people. These are part of the 'People Flow' technology family by Kone. This system offers the option to utilise the 'Kone Monitoring System', which enables you to monitor and track the turnstiles and elevator systems.

=== Kone Destination ===
Kone Destination allows for a fast and efficient ride from floor to floor in a building. The system uses a touch screen panel/terminal that shows the floor numbers, and when the floor is selected, it calls the nearest elevator to the floor you called and takes you to your floor with minimal to no stops at your door. The system also allows for the turnstiles to work together with the elevators, so when you swipe your access card on the turnstile, it calls the nearest elevator. There is also an app for the elevator system that allows you to call and type in your destination from your mobile device, reducing wait time. This system offers the option to integrate the Kone Monitoring System, which enables you to monitor and track turnstiles and elevator systems.

=== Elevators ===
The Kone MonoSpace for low to mid-rise buildings is the world's first machine-room-less elevator. The Kone EcoSpace elevator is a machine-room-less traction elevator designed for low-rise buildings, ranging from 2 to 4 stories, as an energy-efficient alternative to hydraulic elevators. It can fit in an existing hydraulic elevator hoistway. Maximum speed is 150 feet per minute (0.76 m/s). The Kone MiniSpace elevator, featuring a compact machine room, is often used in high-rise buildings.

== Industrial action ==
On 7 April 2015, about 300 Kone UK employees took industrial action. The protest was over the company's introduction of tracking devices on vehicles.

== See also ==
- List of elevator manufacturers
