= Carbon-fiber tape =

Carbon-fiber tape is a flat material made of carbon fiber. It weighs one-seventh as much as steel for a given strength.

== Durability ==
The carbon fiber core lasts longer than conventional steel cable. The material is resistant to wear and abrasion and, unlike steel, does not densify and stretch.

== Applications ==
In June 2013, Kone elevator company announced Ultrarope for use as a replacement for steel cables in elevators. It seals the carbon fibers in high-friction polymer. Unlike steel cable, Ultrarope was designed for buildings that require up to 1,000 meters of lift. Steel elevators top out at 500 meters.

The company estimated that in a 500-meter-high building, an elevator would use 15 per cent less electrical power than a steel-cabled version. As of June 2013, the product had passed all European Union and US certification tests.

== See also ==
- Carbon fibers
- Carbon nanotube
