= Pekka Herlin =

Finnish business executive (1932–2003)

- Born: 15 July 1932; Helsinki, Finland
- Died: 4 April 2003 (aged 70); Kirkkonummi, Finland
- Title: president, Kone
- Term: 1964–
- Spouse: married
- Children: 4 including Antti Herlin; Ilkka Herlin
- Parent: Heikki H. Herlin

Pekka Aksel Herlin (15 July 1932 – 4 April 2003) was a Finnish businessman, the president of the elevator and escalator maker Kone from 1964.

In 1954, Pekka Herlin joined Kone, and succeeded his father as president in 1964, and started planning a new elevator factory in Hyvinkää to replace the "cramped and inefficient" Helsinki plant.

When he died in 2003, and it was discovered that he had rewritten his will in 1999, leaving most of the elevator and escalator maker Kone to his son Antti Herlin. Ilkka Herlin and his siblings Ilona and Niklas were unhappy about not being informed, and the dispute finally ended in 2005. The Kone company was split, with Antti receiving a majority stake in its core elevator business. Ilkka and his siblings received a majority of Cargotec and a minority stake in the new Kone company. All four siblings became billionaires.
