= Montgomery Elevator =

Montgomery

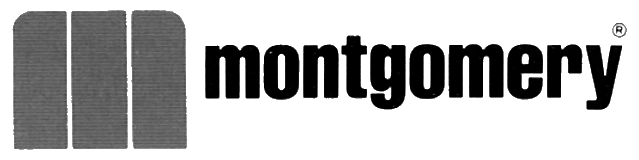
- Montgomery logo used from 1982-1994 until the KONE acquisition in 1994
- Industry: Elevator and Escalator
- Predecessor: Moline Elevator Company
- Founded: 1892
- Founder: A.E. (Alexander) Montgomery, James Montgomery, Samuel Montgomery, and Robert Montgomery
- Defunct: 1994
- Fate: Merged to KONE
- Successor: KONE
- Headquarters: 1 Montgomery Dr, Moline, Illinois
- Products: Elevators, Escalators, Dumbwaiters, Power Walks, and Power Ramps

Montgomery Elevator Company was a vertical transportation company founded in 1892, but entered the elevator business in 1910, acquired Roelofson Elevator of Galt, Ontario in the early 1960s and operated it as its Canadian Division. Montgomery manufactured elevators, escalators, and moving walkways until 1994, when it was acquired by KONE.

Montgomery was the 4th-largest elevator company in the U.S. at the time. After Montgomery was acquired, they worked with KONE to make elevators and escalators under the brand name Montgomery KONE, but only for 6 years until the full integration into KONE US in 2000.

One of the most unusual Montgomery elevators in the world is the elevator tramway in the St. Louis Gateway Arch.

== Test Tower ==
Montgomery did have a test tower to test high-speed elevators located at their former headquarters in Moline, IL. The test tower was built in 1966 and has a height equivalent of 18-stories. There are three shafts in the tower, two of them are to test high-rise elevators, and one of them is to test safety features on the elevator (Freefall, Emergency Brakes, etc). The top floor of the test tower was a conference space for the company to have meetings. Below the conference space was an experimental floor where elevator components get tested along with elevator controllers.

The test tower still stands today but its future is uncertain after the City of Moline purchased the property.

== See also ==
- List of elevator manufacturers
