= Parliament House, Helsinki =

Finnish legislative meeting place

Parliament House
- Eduskuntatalo; Riksdagshuset
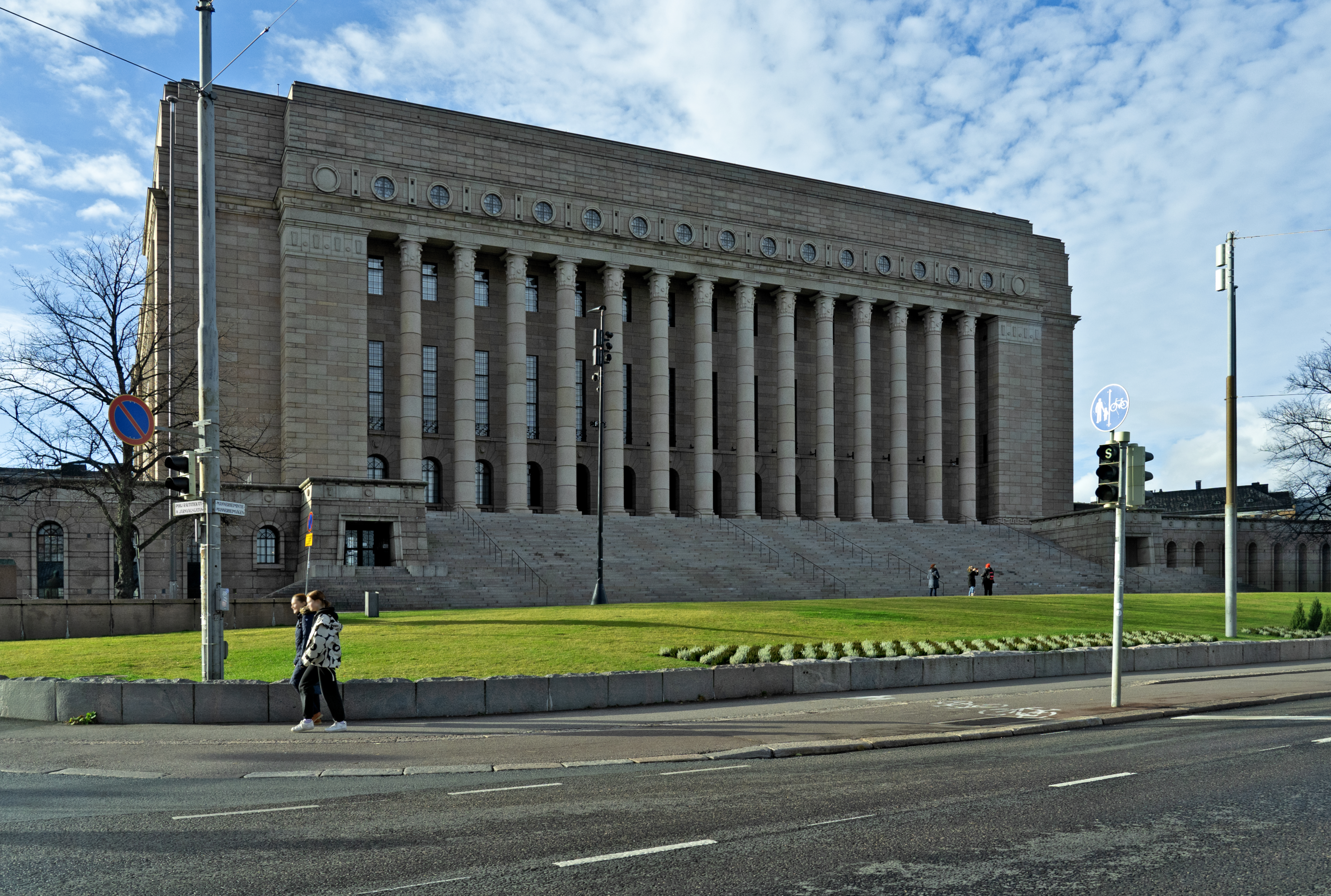
- Interactive map of the Parliament House area

General information
- Type: Governmental
- Architectural style: Stripped Classicism; Nordic Classicism
- Location: Etu-Töölö, Helsinki, Finland, Mannerheimintie 30
- Coordinates: 60°10′21″N 024°56′00″E
- Construction started: 1926
- Completed: 7 March 1931; 95 years ago
- Owner: Finnish Government

Height
- Height: 25 metres (82 ft)

Technical details
- Floor count: 6

Design and construction
- Architect: Johan Sigfrid Sirén
- Main contractor: Finnish Government

The Parliament House (Finnish: Eduskuntatalo [ˈedusˌkuntɑˌtɑlo], Swedish: Riksdagshuset) is the seat of the Parliament of Finland. It is located in the Finnish capital Helsinki, in the district of Etu-Töölö.

== History ==
In 1923, a competition was held to choose a site for a new parliament house. Arkadianmäki, a hill beside what is now Mannerheimintie, was chosen as the best place to build on.

The architectural competition which was held in 1924 was won by the firm of Borg–Sirén–Åberg with a proposal called Oratoribus (Latin for "for the speakers"). Johan Sigfrid Sirén (1889–1961), who was mainly responsible for preparing the proposal, was given the task of designing Parliament House. The building was constructed between 1926–1931 and was officially inaugurated on March 7, 1931. Ever since then, and especially during the Winter War and Continuation War, it has been the scene of many key moments in the nation's politics.

On September 25, 2024, the Finnish Extinction Rebellion and Swedish Återställ Våtmarker sprayed red paint on the pillars of Parliament House as a protest against the coal-industry.

On August 19, 2025, incumbent MP Eemeli Peltonen was reported to have died from suicide inside the building.

== Architecture and features ==
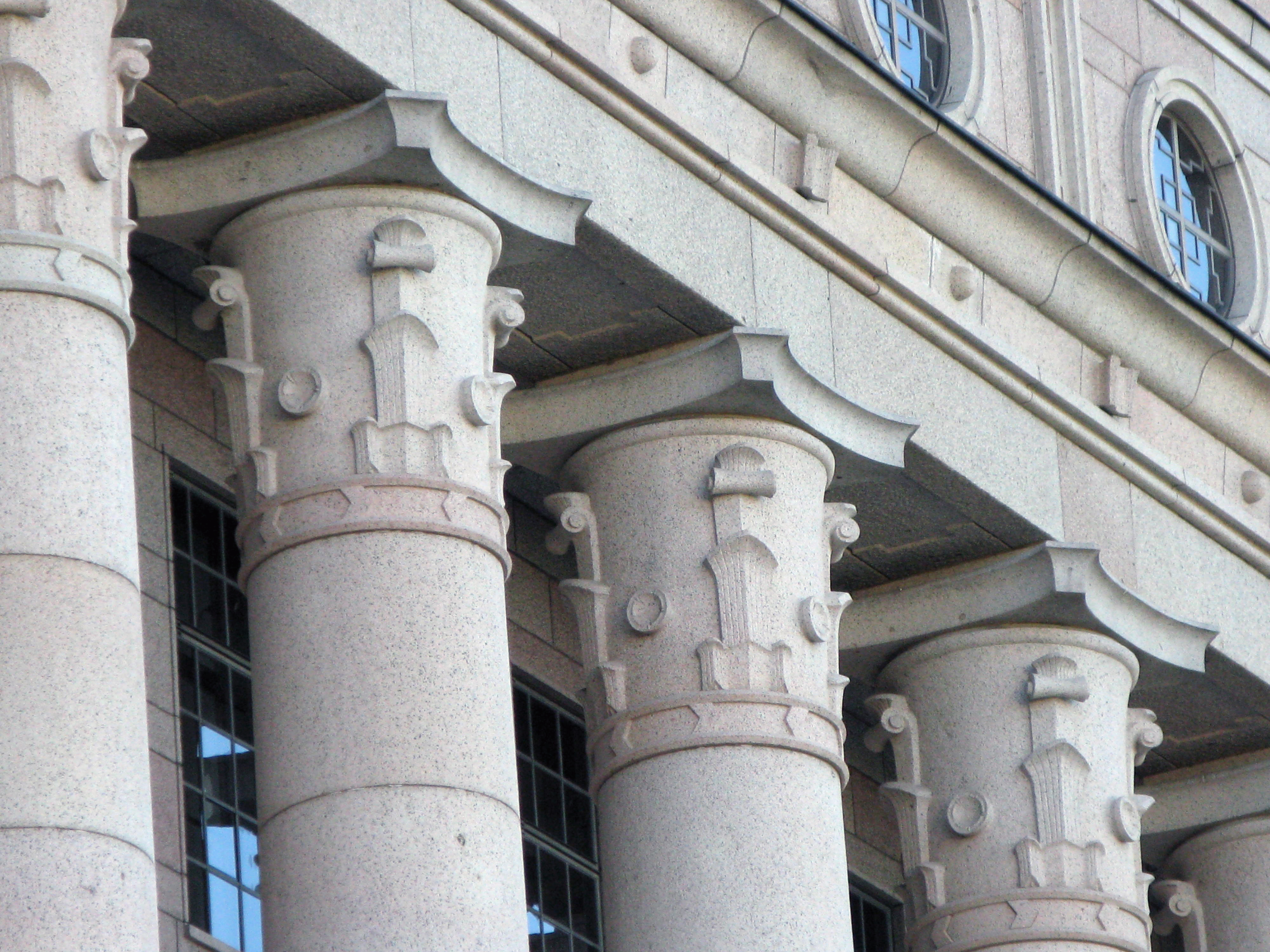
The exterior wall of the Parliament House. The stripped Corinthian capitals of Parliament House are made of red Kalvola granite.

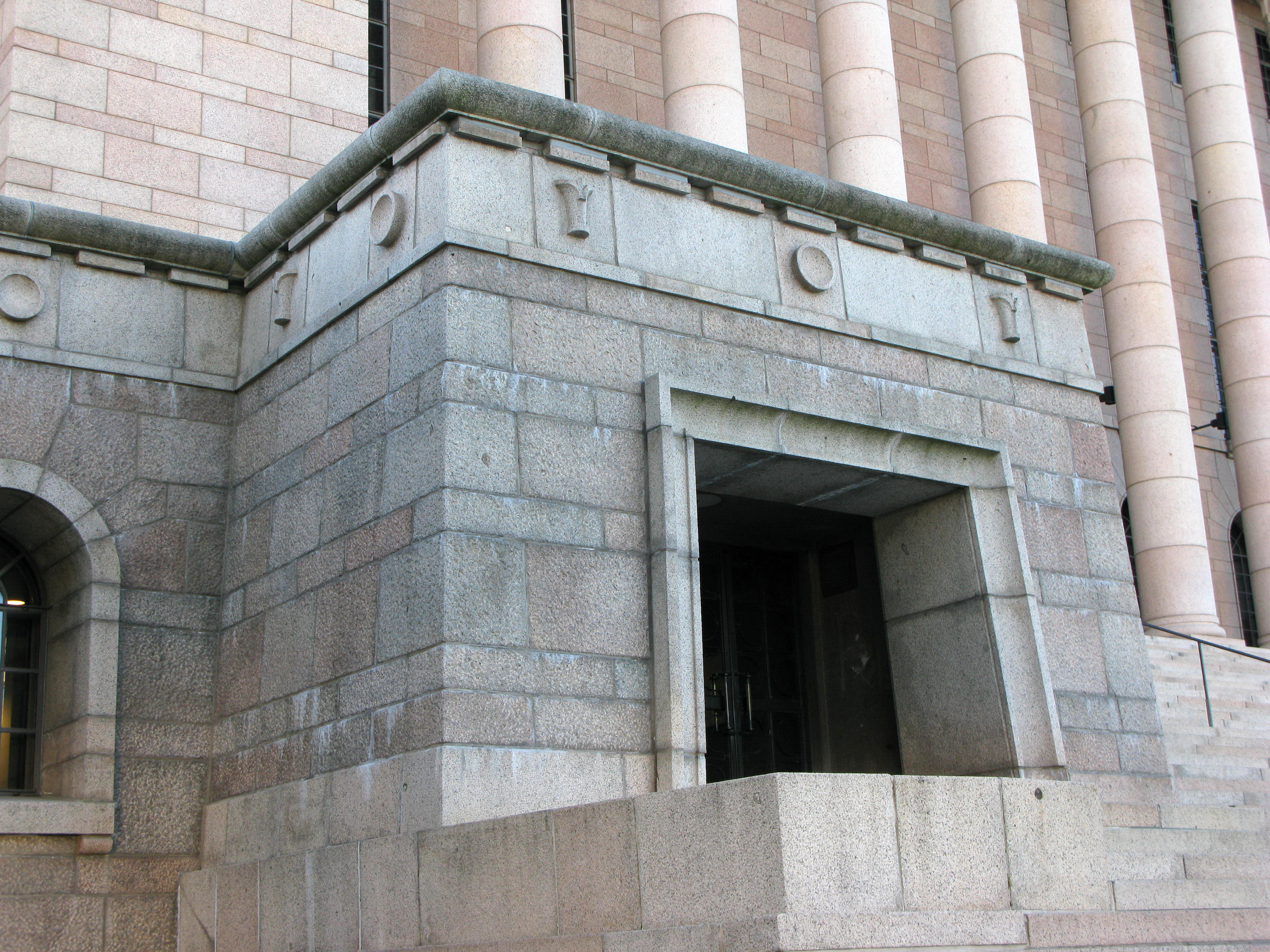
The former public entrances are on both sides of the main staircase.

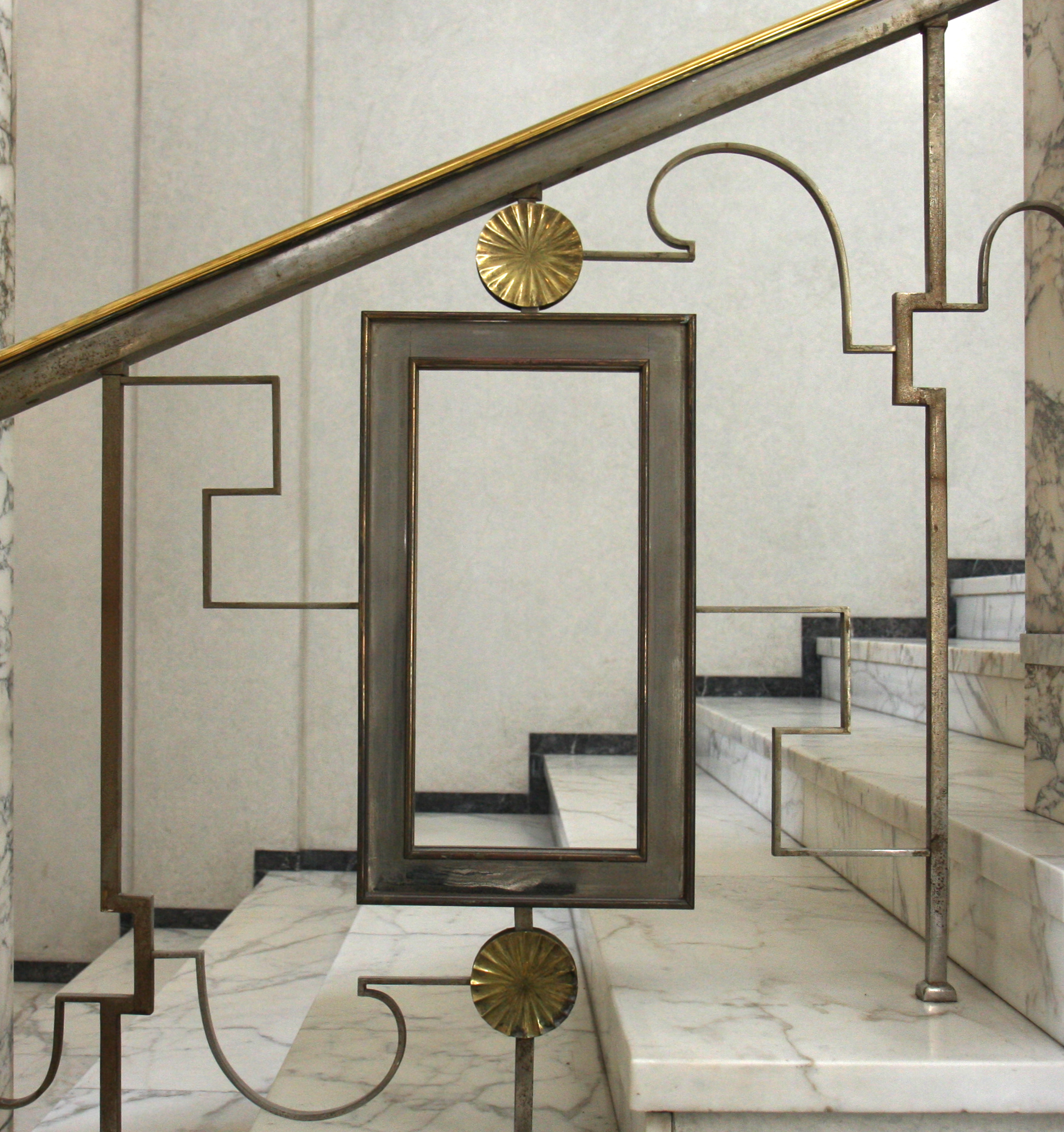
Interior art deco patterning.

Sirén designed Parliament House in a stripped classical architectural style, combining Neoclassicism with early twentieth century modernism. Sirén's combination of simplified columns and balusters with uncomplicated planar geometry bears comparison to similar explorations by Erik Gunnar Asplund and Jože Plečnik. The façade is lined by fourteen columns with highly stylized Corinthian capitals, all made from red granite from Kalvola.

The building has six floors, each of which are unique. Five of the floors are connected by a white marble staircase and paternoster lifts. The most important for visitors looking to visit are the main lobby, the stately debate chamber (Session Hall) and the large reception hall (State Hall).

Notable later additions to the building include the library annex, completed in 1978, and a separate office block, Finnish Parliament Annex (Finnish: Pikkuparlamentti), completed in 2004, the necessity of which was an object of some controversy.

=== Floors of the Parliament House ===
==== First floor ====
The first floor contains the main lobby, the Speaker's reception rooms, the newspaper room, the information service, the documents office, the messenger centre, the copying room, the restaurant, and some separate function rooms. At both ends of the lobby are marble staircases leading up to the fifth floor.

==== Second floor ====
The second floor, also known as the main floor, is centered on the plenary chamber. Its galleries have seats for the public, the press, and diplomats. Also located on this floor are the reception hall (the Hall of State), the Speaker's Corridor, the Government Corridor, the cafeteria, and adjacent function rooms.

==== Third floor ====
The third floor includes facilities for the information unit and the media, and provides direct access to the press gallery of the plenary chamber. The Minutes Office and a number of committee rooms are also located here.

==== Fourth floor ====
The fourth floor is reserved for committees. Its largest rooms are the Grand Committee room and the Finance Committee room.

==== Fifth floor ====
The fifth floor contains meeting rooms and offices for the parliamentary groups.

==== Sixth floor ====
Additional offices for the parliamentary groups are located on the sixth floor, along with additional facilities for the media.

=== Statues of the former presidents ===
Most of the statues of former presidents of the Republic of Finland have been placed in the vicinity of the Parliament House. On the lawn in front of the house is the statue of Kaarlo Juho Ståhlberg from 1959 and the statue of Pehr Evind Svinhufvud from 1961, both carved by Wäinö Aaltonen, the former on the north and the latter on the south. In the same block, in the Parliament Park immediately north of the Parliament House, there is a statue of Kyösti Kallio from 1962, carved by his son Kalervo Kallio.

== Sightseeing ==
Public guided tours are arranged on Thursdays at 11 a.m. Tours are free, but require an advance booking. One can also watch plenary visits on Tuesdays and Wednesdays at 2 p.m., Thursdays at 4 p.m. and Fridays at 1 p.m. The Thursday plenary sessions open with Question Time. The plenary session on Friday normally lasts 30 minutes at most. There are no plenary sessions during the election break.

== Gallery ==
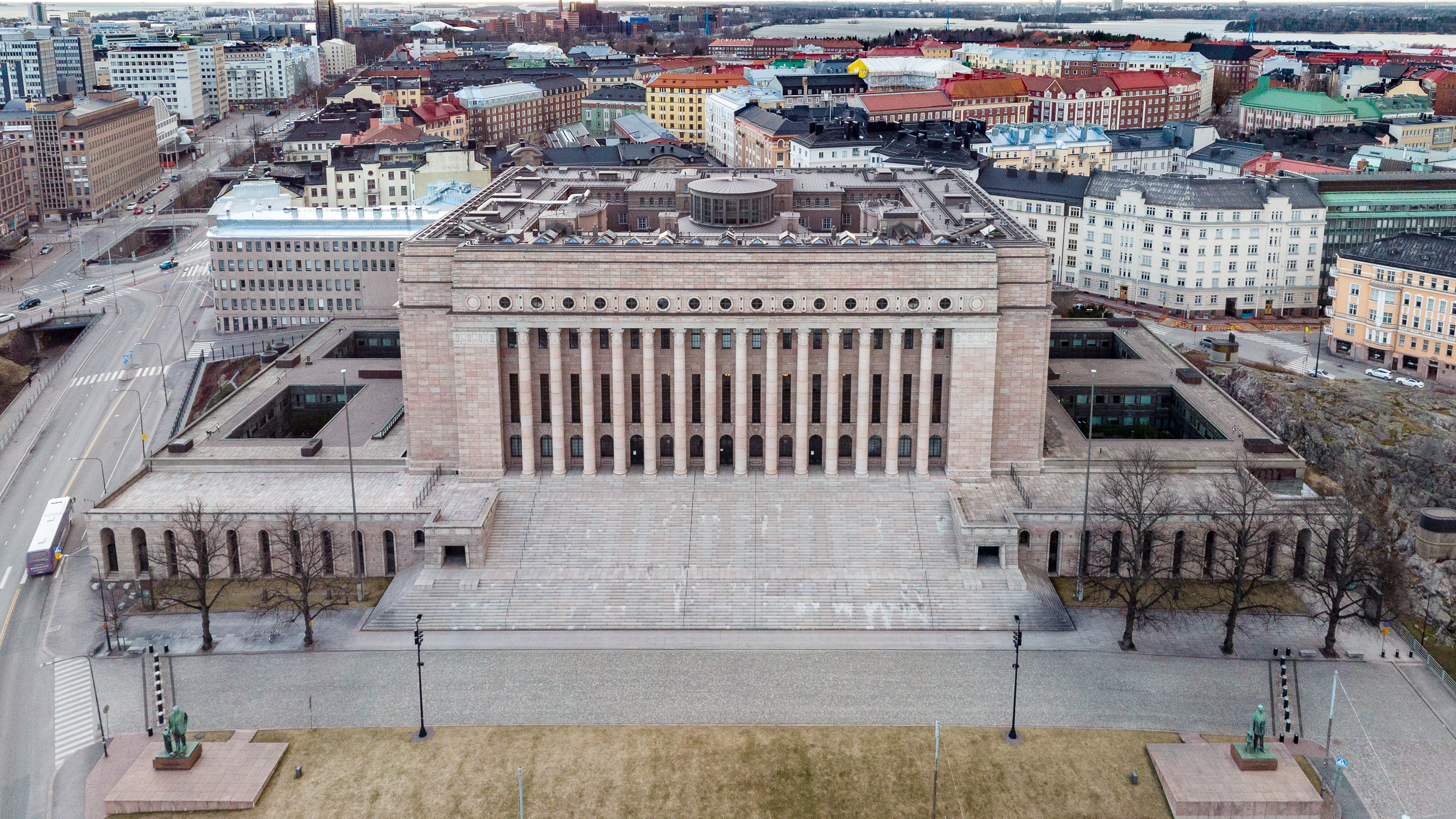
Aerial view of Parliament House

Parliament House during the 1952 Summer Olympics

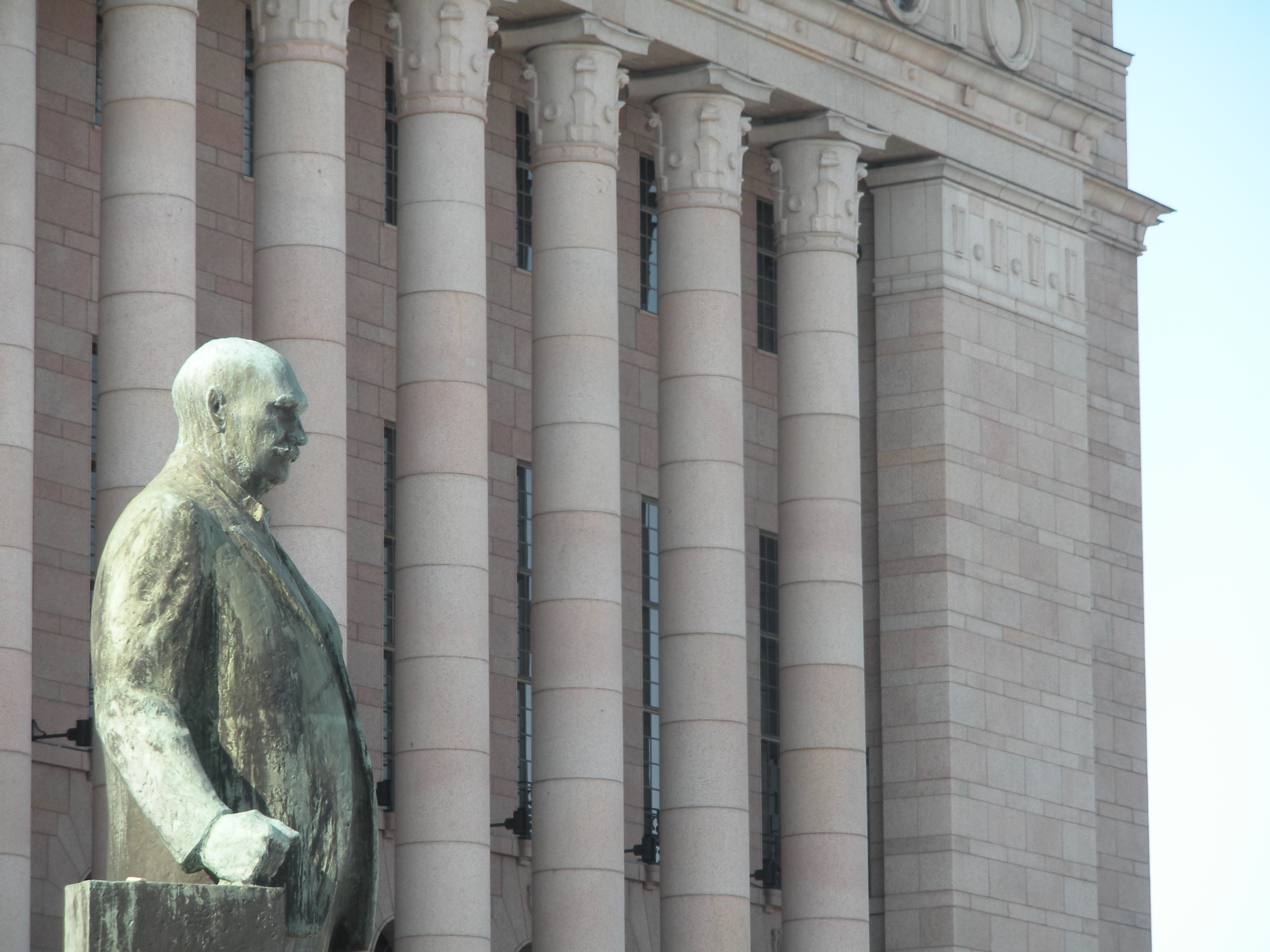
Statue of P. E. Svinhufvud by Wäinö Aaltonen

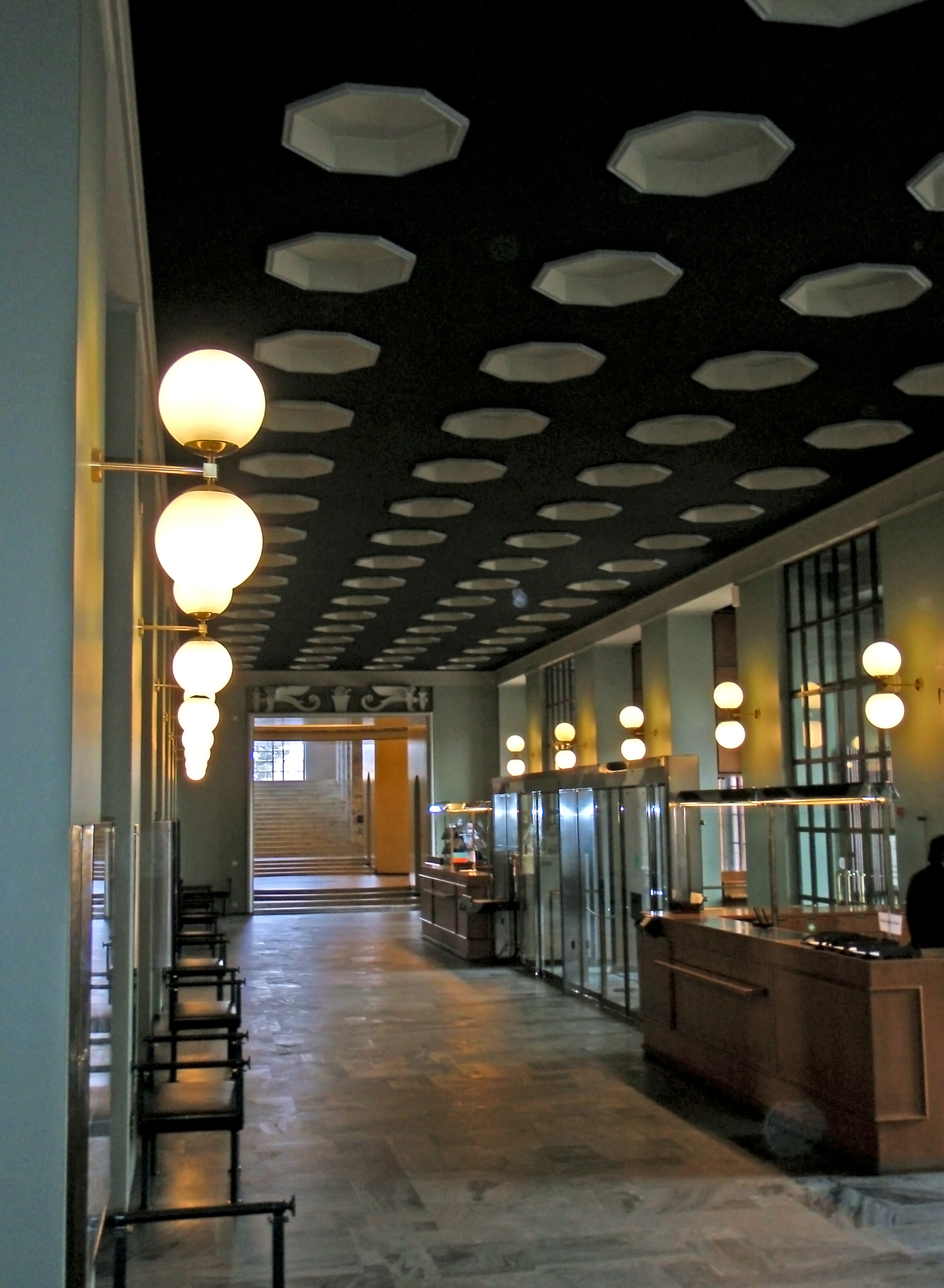
Entrance lobby

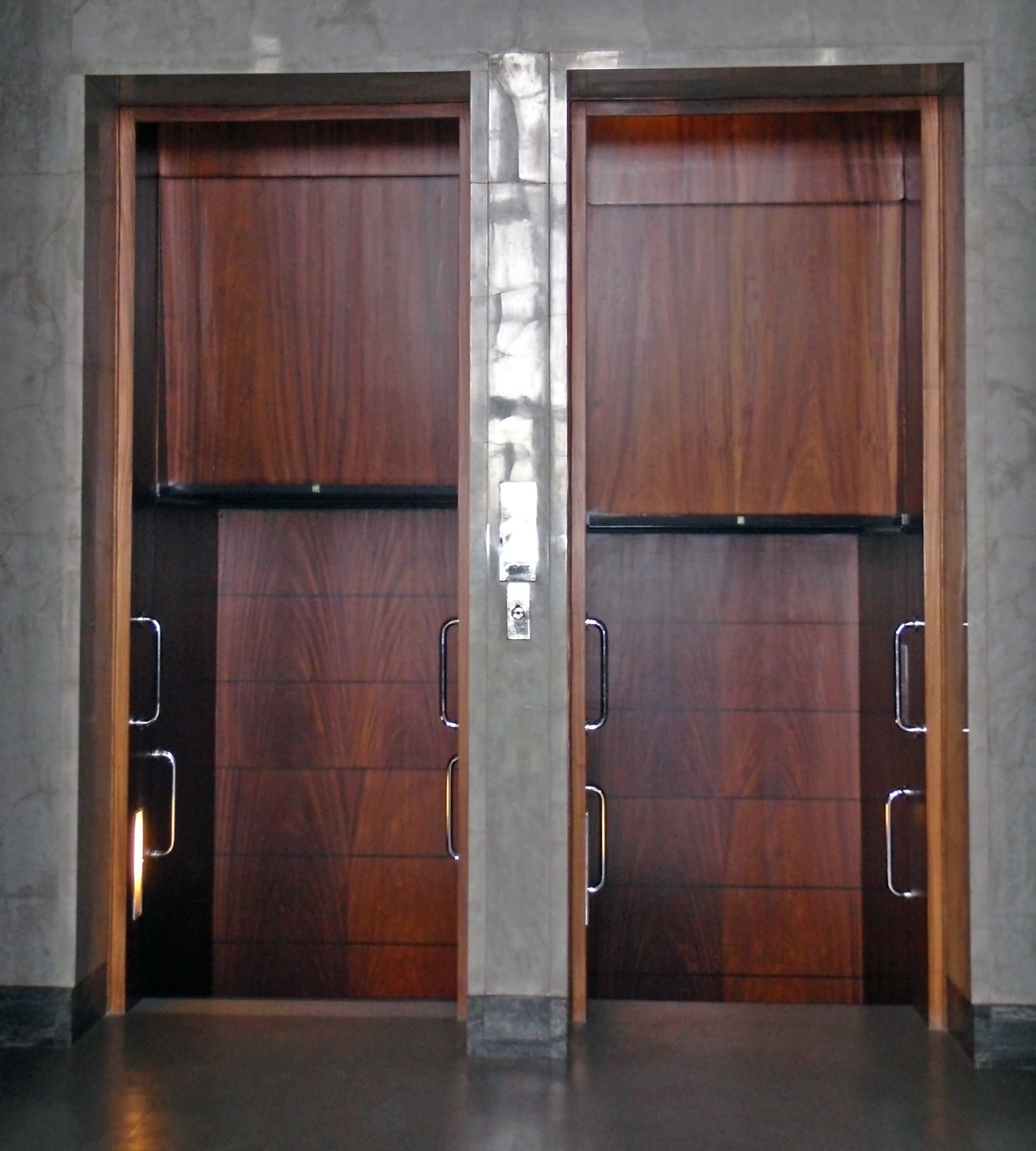
Paternoster lift
(there is also a normal elevator)

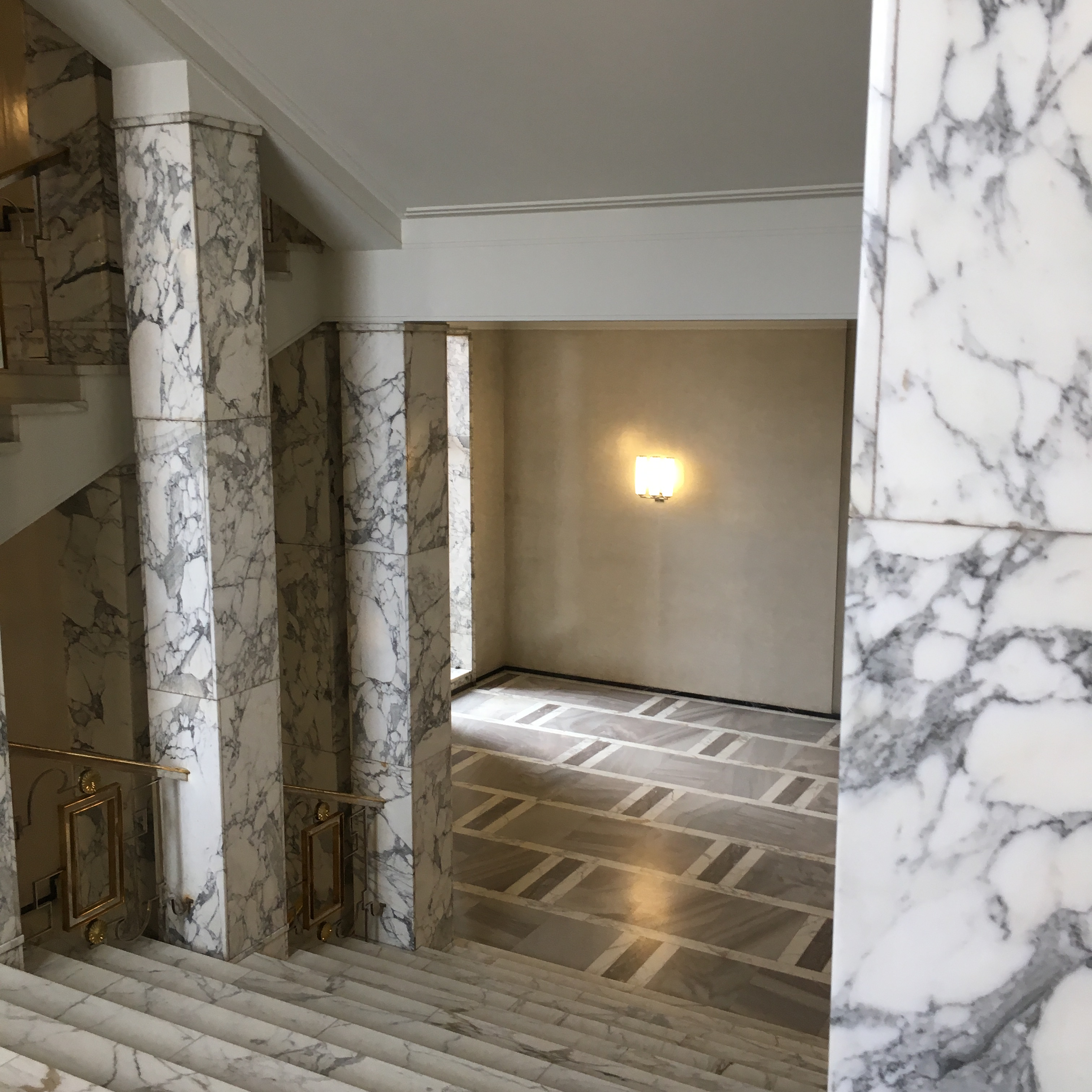
White marble staircase

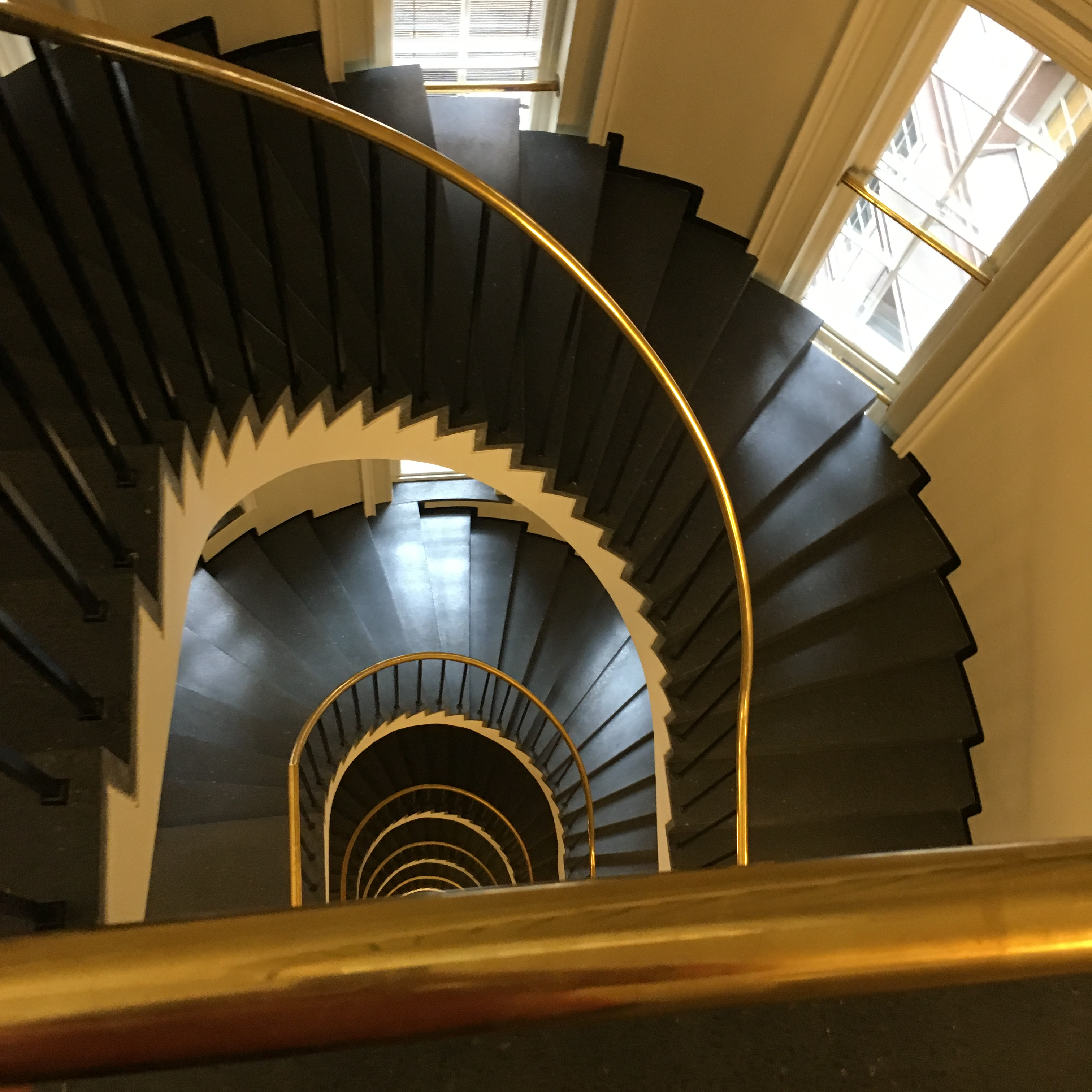
Curved staircase

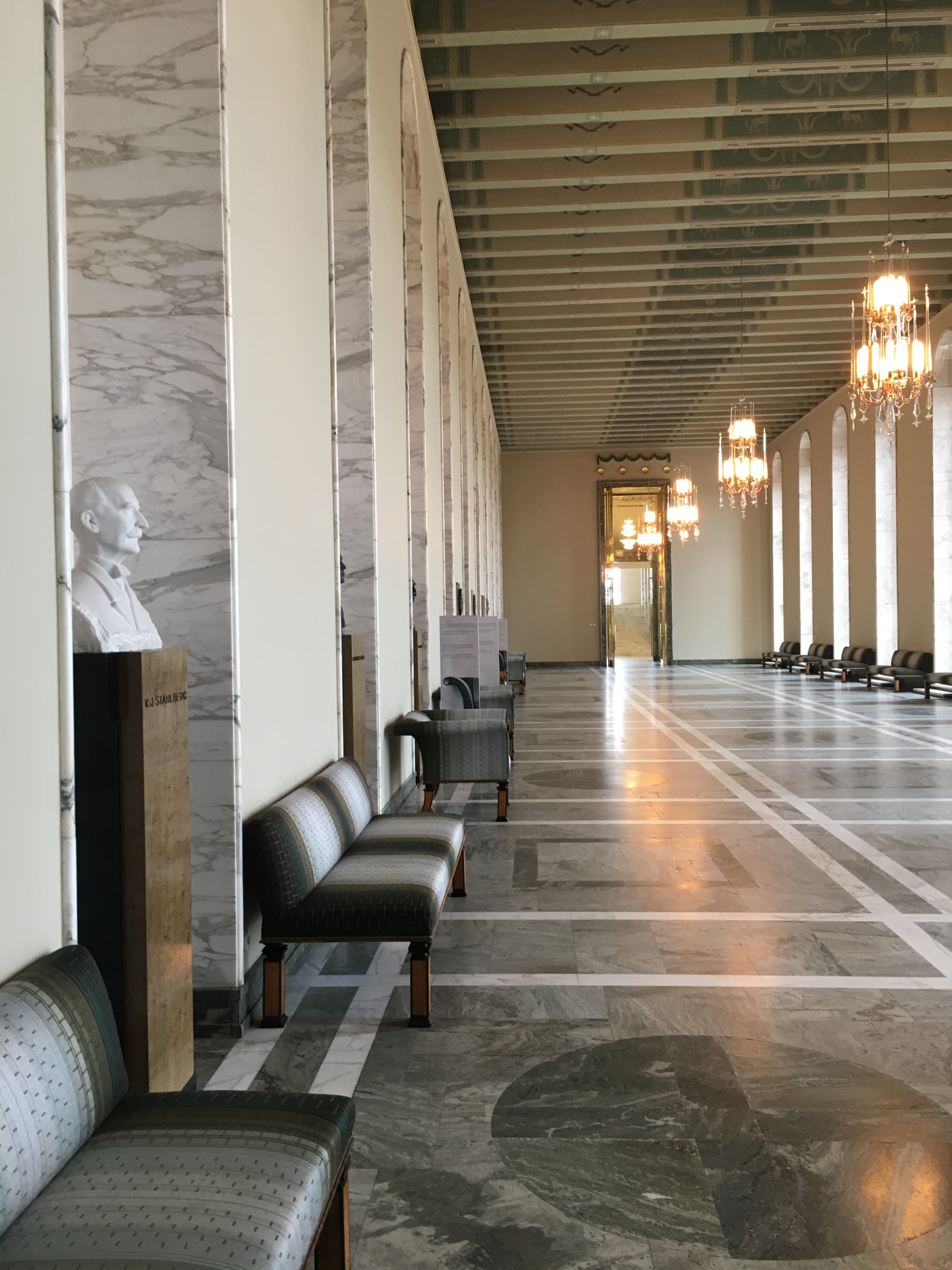
State Hall
(Note: With busts of the five people who have acted as both president and speaker of parliament.)

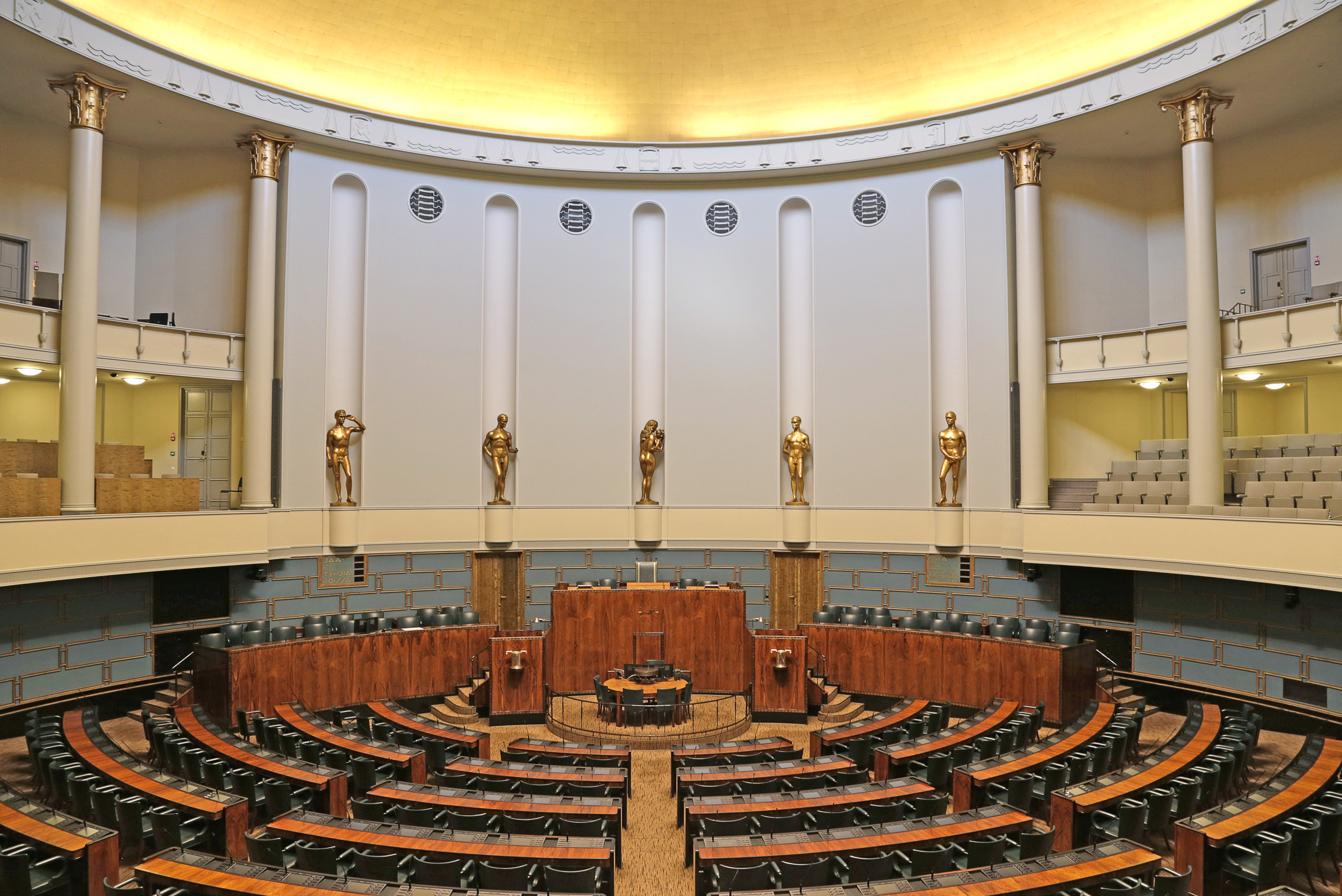
Session Hall
(the statues are Work and the Future by Wäinö Aaltonen)

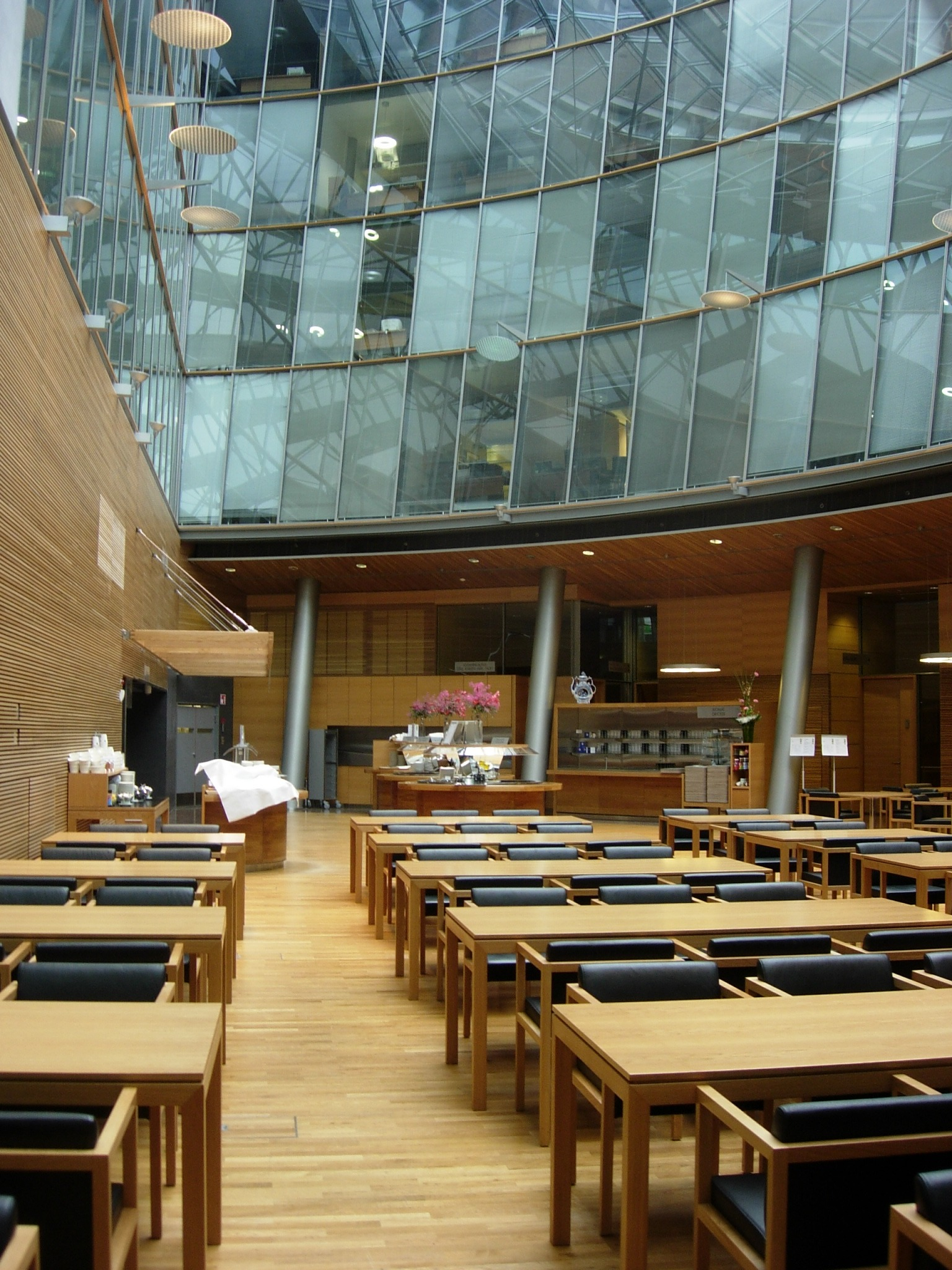
Cafeteria of the Finnish Parliament Annex

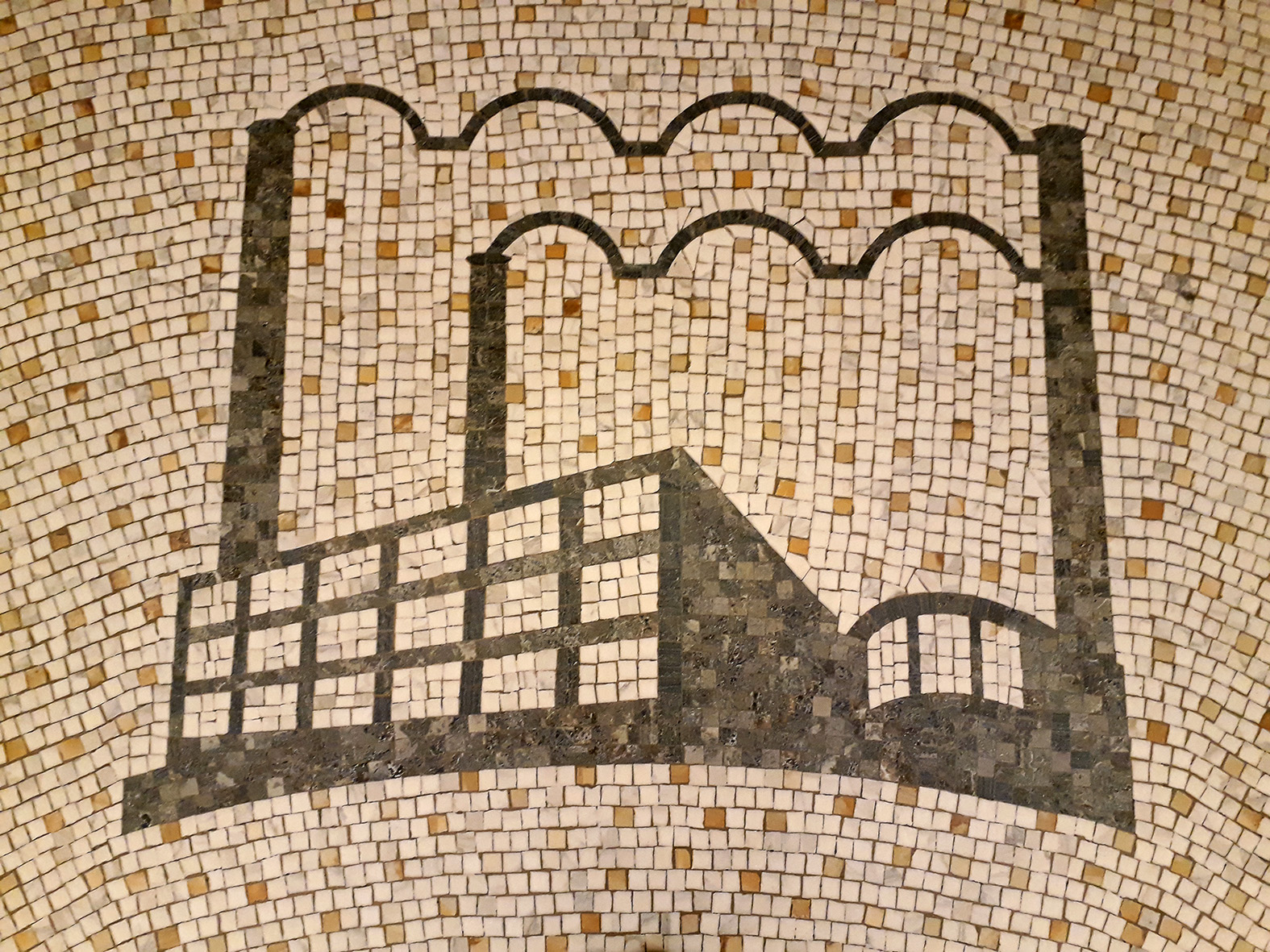
Floor mosaics present in the elevator lobbies

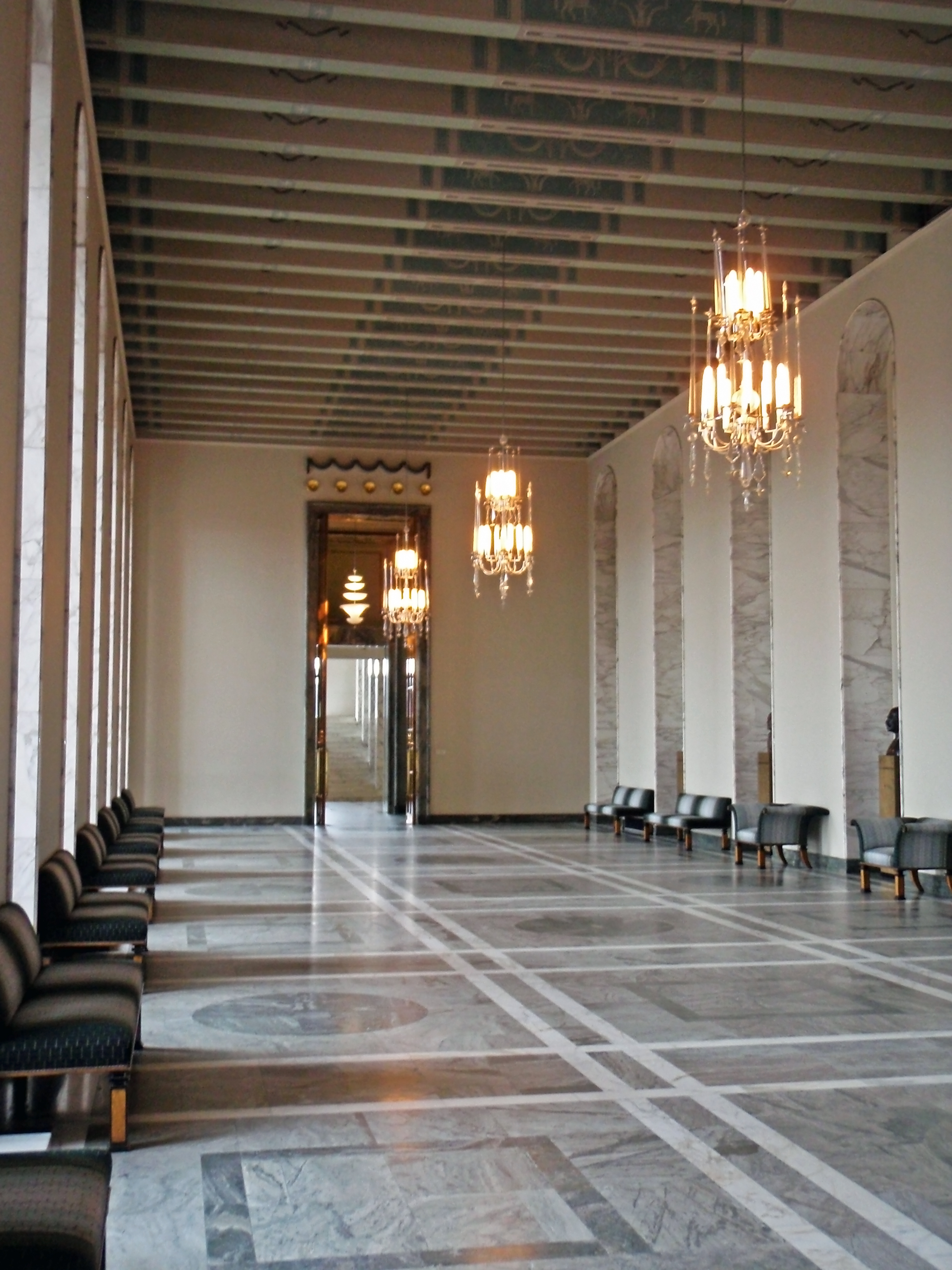
State Hall from a different angle

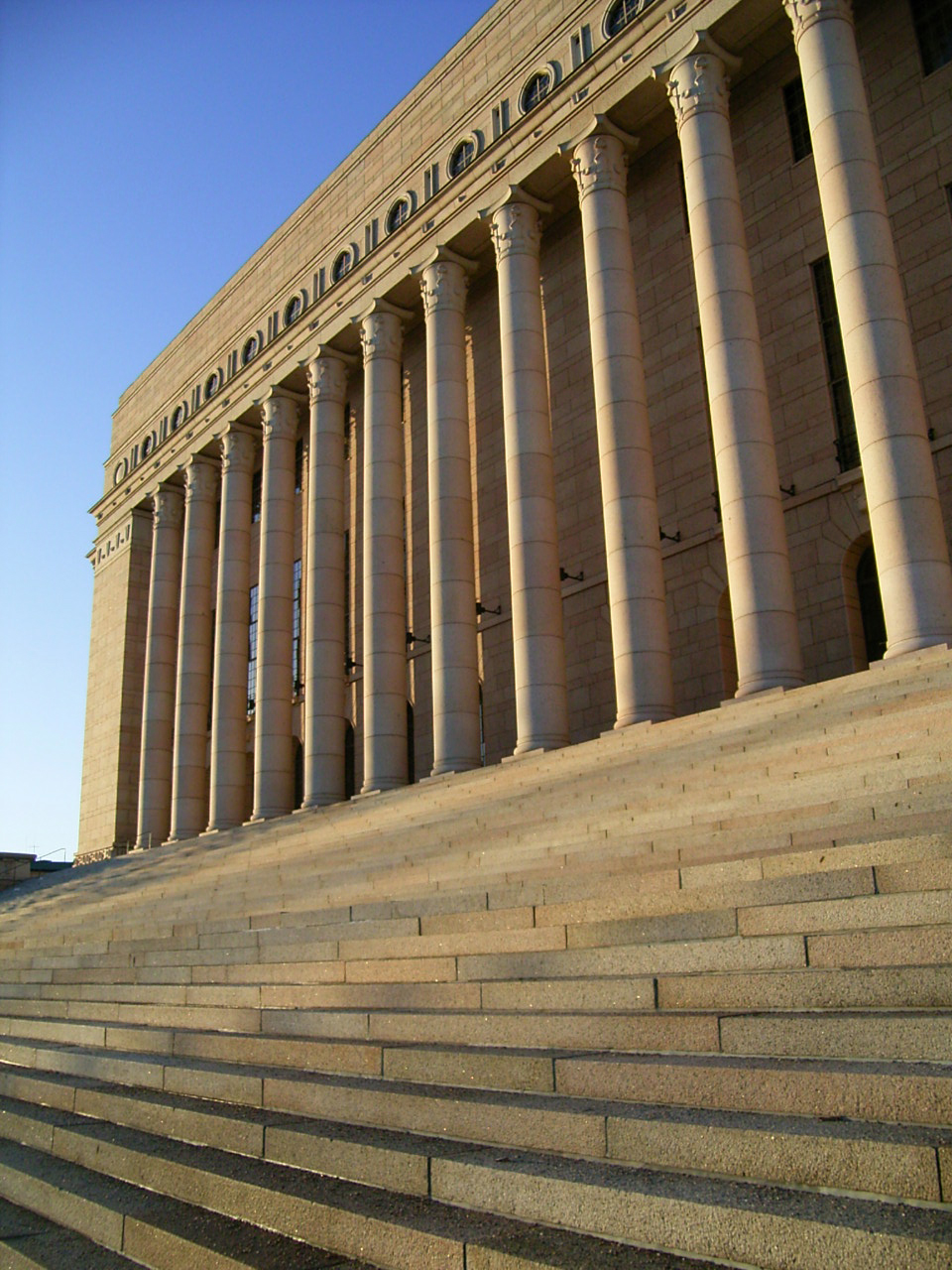
Exterior wall

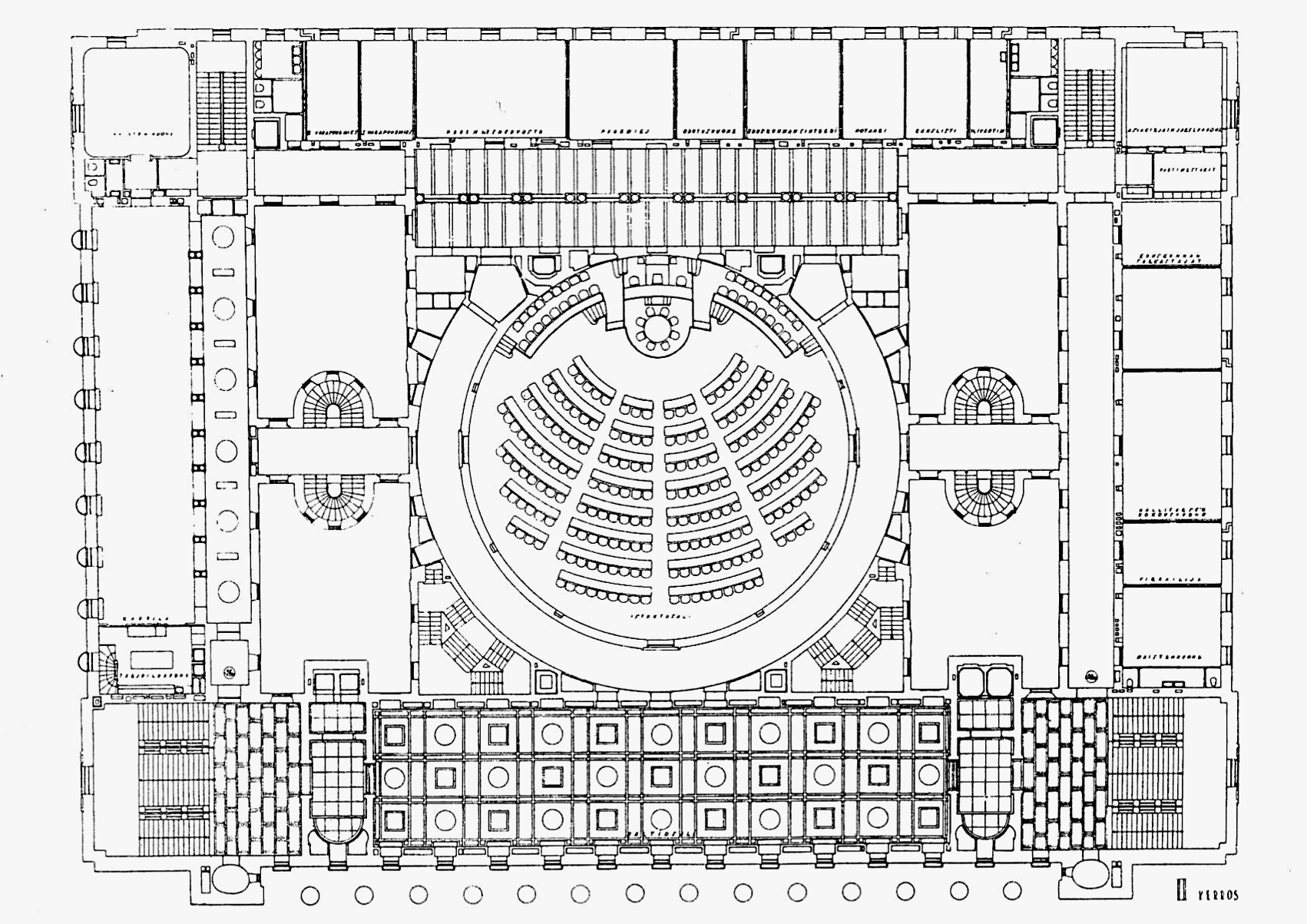
Floor plan of the second floor. In the middle is the State Hall, the Session Hall and the speakers' rooms, on the left is the cafeteria and one of the three meeting rooms specifically reserved for female MPs. On the right, the meeting rooms reserved for the use of the parliamentary councils. Four patios are located on both sides of the Parliamentary House's Session Hall.

== See also ==
- Politics of Finland
- Helsinki City Hall
- House of the Estates
