= Finnish Parliament Annex =

- Eduskunnan lisärakennus Pikkuparlamentti; Lilla parlamentet
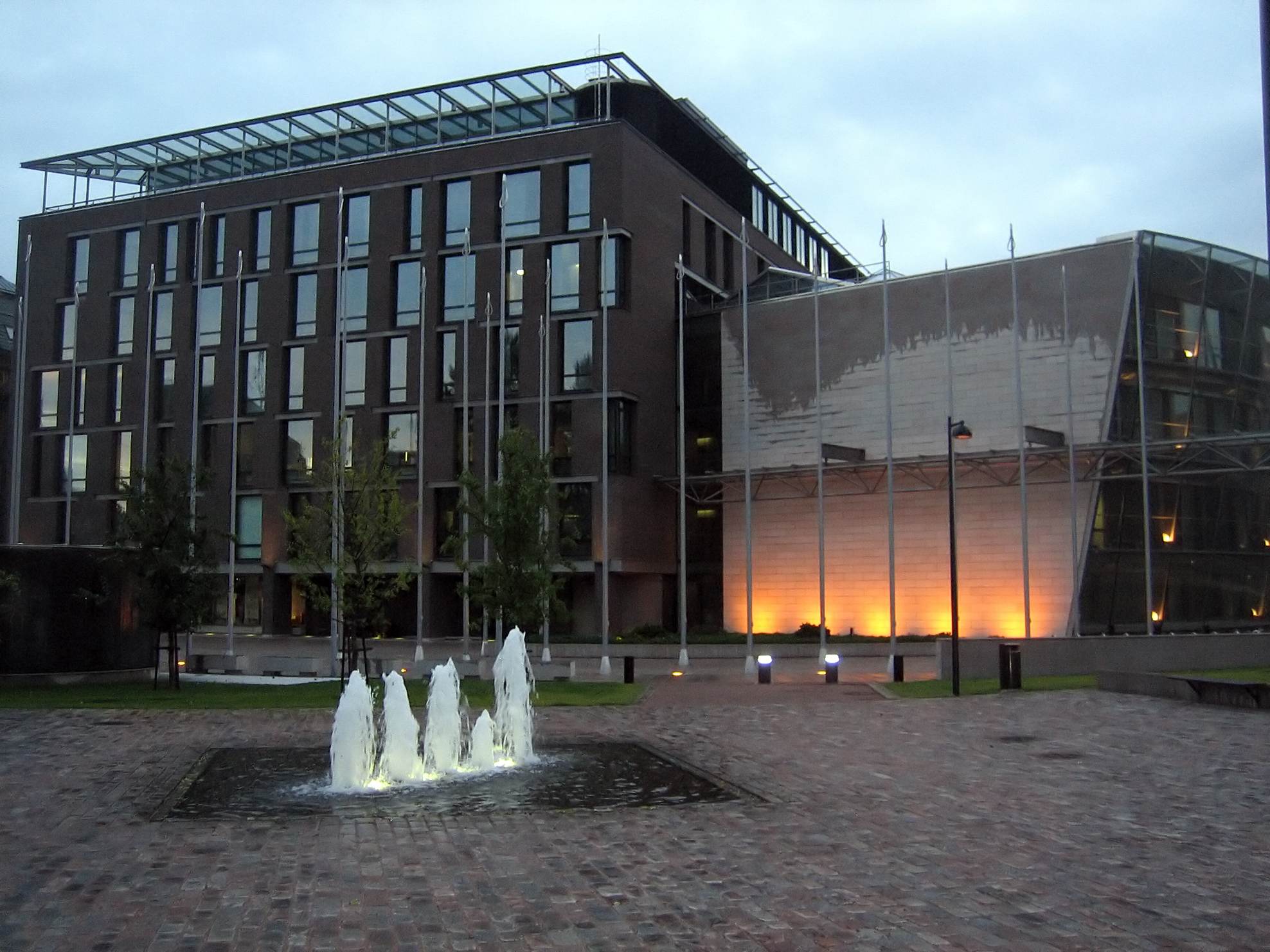
- Interactive map of the Finnish Parliament Annex area

General information
- Type: Governmental
- Location: Helsinki, Finland
- Coordinates: 60°10′17″N 024°56′02″E
- Completed: 2004

Design and construction
- Architect: Pekka Helin

The Finnish Parliament Annex (Finnish: Pikkuparlamentti, Swedish: Lilla parlamentet; lit. 'Little Parliament') is a building in the centre of Helsinki, Finland. It houses offices for about one hundred members of the Parliament of Finland. The building was built in 2004 and the design comes from the winning entry of a design competition held from 1998 to 2000. The building was designed by the architect Pekka Helin and his team.

In addition to the offices, the building has a "Kansalaisinfo" information office that is open to the public, the EU secretariat of the Parliament, the office of the Parliamentary Ombudsman, and the offices of the Grand Committee and the Foreign Affairs Committee of the Parliament.

Materials used to build the Pikkuparlamentti building include many different kinds of wood and stone, for example birch, maple and pine, and granite gathered from various places in Finland.

The name "Pikkuparlamentti" comes from a restaurant which originally stood at the same site.

== See also ==
- Eduskuntatalo
