= Epsilon Composite =

Epsilon Composite is a French company created in 1987 by Stephane LULL, its current CEO. The company was founded in January 1987. Its production site is located in Gaillan, France. Stéphane Lull is the CEO.

== Overview ==
Epsilon Composite designs and produces a wide range of Carbon-fiber-reinforced polymer (CFRP) products for various applications:

- Manufacturing and printing machines (flexography and textile industries)
- Energy (oil & gas offshore exploitation, wind turbines)
- Civil Engineering
- Camera support equipment (tripods)
- Automotive and leisure applications
- Aerospace (Airbus and Flying Whales Tier-1 supplier)

The main production process used by the company are pultrusion and its pull-winding variant.

== Awards and recognition ==
In 2021, one of the company's projects was selected as JEC Innovation Awards finalist in the Aerospace category.

Epsilon Composite won the 2023 Global Industrie Award for the development of an innovative composite overmolding process.
