= Heikki H. Herlin =

Finnish businessman

vuorineuvos Heikki Hugo Herlin
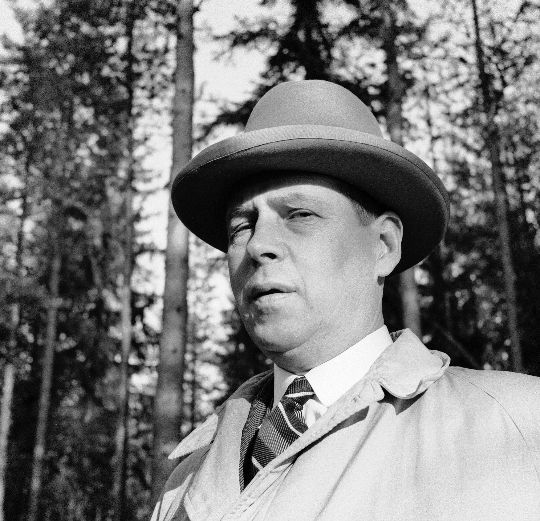
- Heikki H. Herlin in 1955.
- Born: 7 February 1901; Helsinki, Grand Duchy of Finland
- Died: 21 August 1989 (aged 88); Kirkkonummi, Finland
- Education: MSc (technology)
- Alma mater: Helsinki University of Technology
- Board member of: see →board memberships
- Spouse: Anna Maria née Oittinen
- Children: 4, including Pekka Herlin
- Parent
- Awards: see →awards

Manager of Kone
- In office 1932–1964
- Preceded by: Harald Herlin
- Succeeded by: Pekka Herlin

Manager of Emali
- In office 1932–1943

Manager of Raahe
- In office 1953–1962

Heikki Hugo Herlin (7 February 1901 – 21 August 1989) was a Finnish engineer, industrialist and vuorineuvos.

Herlin gained experience by studying and working abroad, before he inherited his father's position as manager of the lift producer Kone Oy in 1932. He developed the company substantially and started exports already in the 1930s. After Kone had participated at delivering large number of units to Soviet Union as part of the Finnish war reparations, Herlin established fruitful business relations with the Soviet Union. Herlin had broad language skills which he utilised when he developed Kone an international company. In 1964 he gave the leadership to his son Pekka Herlin, continuing still as a board member.

Herlin was member of many company boards as wells as non-profit associations. He founded the Kone Foundation which supports cultural and sociological research.

== Early years ==
Herlin's parents were engineer Harald Herlin and Minna née Westerlund. Harald Herlin was a water piping specialist and he managed plumbing company Oy Vesijohtoliike Ab until 1920. He also worked as consultant, and at the early 1920s he was assigned to reorganise electromechanical company Ab Gottfr. Strömberg Oy. Subsequently, he bought the company's lift business in 1924. The company, Kone Oy, run small-scale licensed production.

== Studies and early career ==
Herlin studied in Helsinki Finnish Coeducational School and passed his matriculation exam in 1919. He went to study mechanical engineering in Helsinki University of Technology and graduated in 1924. During 1925–1926 Herlin worked for AG Brown Boveri & Cie in Mannheim, Germany. In 1926 he returned to Finland for a short time to work as draftsman for Gottfr. Strömberg, but left already in 1927 to continue his studies in Columbia University, United States. At the same time he worked as draughtsman for some American engineering companies. When Herlin returned to Finland in 1928, he initially worked as a designer for Kone, his father's company. During 1929–1932 Herlin worked as technical manager in Kone- ja Siltarakennus to managing separator production.

== Manager of Kone ==
In 1932 Herlin followed his father as manager of Kone. The production in the Helsinki-located factory had grown steadily during Harald Herlin's leadership, but now the company started to develop rapid. The product quality was improved to meet an international standard and productivity was improved. Finland was in an economical upswing after the 1930s recession was overcome, and number of new buildings, equipped with Kone lifts, were constructed. Also exports started in the same time. Prior to the Winter War, the company employed 300–400 people and the annual production reached 250 lifts. Herlin became an influential representative of the Finnish engineering industry during the war years.

After the Continuation War between Finland and Soviet Union ended to Moscow Armistice, Finland had to pay large war reparations to Soviet Union. This included a number of Kone lifts and cranes. When the war reparations were finally paid off in the early 1950s, Herlin continued the export within normal trade agreements. At the turn of the 1960s, Kone was one of the ten biggest companies of Finland employing 2 000 people.

Heikki H. Herlin led Kone until 1964 after which he was followed by his son Pekka Herlin, but continued as board member until 1987.

== Character ==
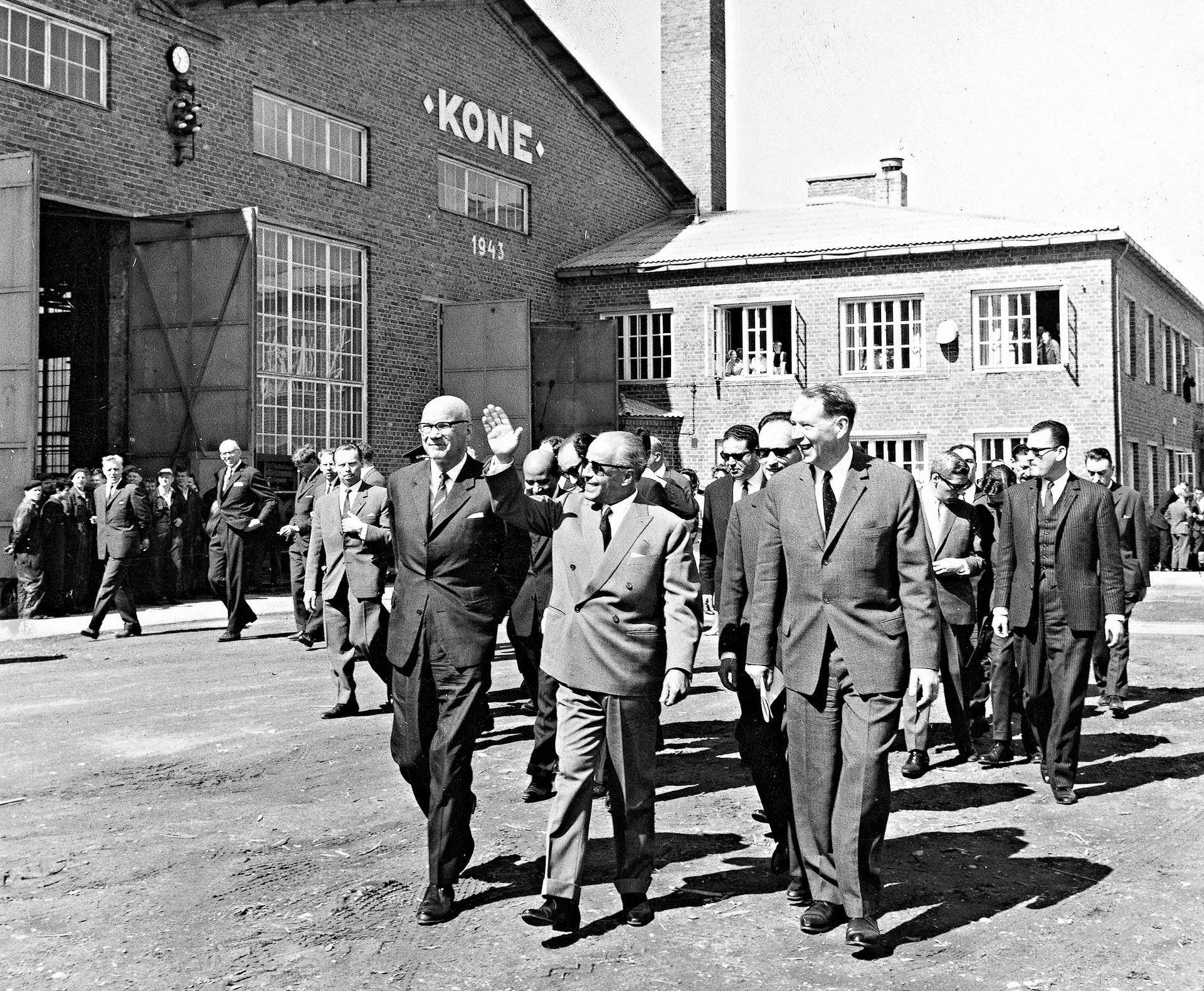
Herlin (right) presenting Kone premises to the Tunisian president Habib Bourguiba (middle) and the Finnish president Urho Kekkonen (left).

Herlin's early international experience effected on his career as Kone manager. He put focus on product development and was open-minded at extending the market area. His contribution on war reparation industry was significant; he also saw the potential of the Soviet market already in the 1940s.

While Herlin had strong background and expertise in engineering industry, he had broad knowledge in other areas as well. He took part in organisational activities, such as Rotary Club and voluntary national defence. Herlin was founding member of the Finnish branch of the European Cultural Foundation. He also founded the Kone Foundation that supports cultural and sociological research; one notable support project was publishing of genealogy book Genealogia Sursilliana.

Heikki H. Herlin had a broad language knowledge, which he developed continuously. While he could communicate in every language which were most important for his business, he also studied exotic languages; for him it was a matter of honour to be able to give at least a vote of thanks in the local language, wherever he visited representing either his company or Finnish trade and industry delegations.

== Personal life ==
Heikki H. Herlin lived in the Thorsvik Estate, which his father had bought. He met there his future wife Anna Oittinen at the turn of the 1930s; she had come there as a nurse to take care of his mother Hanna Herlin. During 1931–1936 the couple got three daughters and one son, Pekka Herlin, who inherited his father's position as Kone leader.

== Board memberships ==
- Peltiteos Oy (1933–)
- Co-operative Finnish Fair (1938–)
- Finnish Metal Industry Association (1938–1965)
- Walter Ahlström Foundation (1938–1944)
- Kulosaari Coeducational School (1940–1953)
- Kone Oy (1941–1987)
- Otanmäki committee (1942–1944)
- Yhteissisu Oy (1943–1946)
- Finnish Metal Industry Association (1944–)
- Kulosaari Neighbourhood Fund Foundation (1944–)
- Engineering office Levator Oy (1946–)
- Mutual life insurance company Sampo (1947–)
- Co-operative Metex (1948–1965)
- Christian Culture Foundation (1948–1952; 1953)
- Helsinki War Invalid Foundation (1949–)
- Rotary International (1950–1951)
- National Defence Support (1951–1959)
- Finnish Reserve Officer Federation Support Association (1951–)
- Finnish Cultural Fund (1951–)
- Finnish Foreign Trade Federation (1951–)
- Moral Re-Armament Support Foundation (1952–)
- Christian-Social Working Centre (1952–)
- Helsinki Telephone Co-operative (1959–1973)
- Fédération International de la Manutention (1966–1968)
- Finnish Technicians' Society (1934–1945)
- Oy Konela Ab

== Awards ==
- Commander of the Order of the Lion of Finland, 1st Class
- Cross of Liberty, 3rd Class, with swords
- Knight of the White Rose of Finland, 1st Class
- Cross of Liberty, 4th Class, peacetime merits
- Memorial Medal for Winter War
- Memorial Medal for Continuation War
- Civil Defence Medal of Merit, 2nd Class
- Yugoslav Great Star (Yugoslavia)
- Hungarian Flag Cross (Hungary)
- Grand-officer of the Order of Glory (Tunisia)
- vuorineuvos (1953)
- Honorary Doctor of Economics (University of Rostock, GDR, 1969)
- Honorary Doctor of Arts (University of Helsinki)
