= Robert MacGregor (engineer) =

- Born: 1873
- Died: 4 October 1956; Whitley Bay
- Occupation: Engineer
- Known for: MacGregor steel hatch cover

Robert MacGregor was a British engineer, who, during the 1920s, concerned over unnecessary losses of North Sea colliers, developed the first steel hatch cover.

The design was simple and consisted of five articulated leaves that stowed neatly at the end of each hatch. Patented in 1929, the steel hatch improved ship and cargo safety and had a lasting impact on cargo care.

In 1937, to promote and sell his steel hatch covers, Robert MacGregor and his brother Joseph formed MacGregor & Company in Whitley Bay on the north-east coast of England.
