= Lemminkäinen Group =

Former Finnish construction company

Lemminkäinen

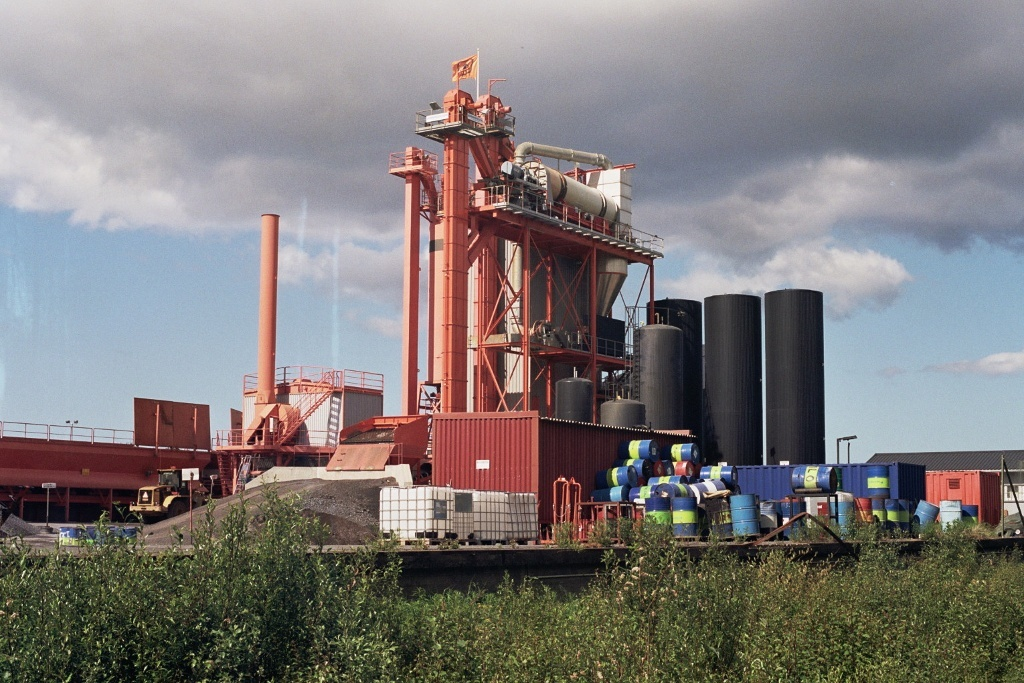
- Company type: Public company
- Traded as: Nasdaq Helsinki: LEM1S
- Industry: Construction
- Founded: 1910
- Defunct: 2018
- Headquarters: Helsinki, Finland
- Key people: Casimir Lindholm (Chief executive officer)
- Services: Paving; Infrastructure construction; Building construction
- Revenue: ▲2 044.5 million € (2014)
- Operating income: ▲36.3 million € (2014)
- Number of employees: 4 748 (2014)

Lemminkäinen Group was a Finnish company that operated in the construction industry. Its business areas were building construction and infrastructure construction. The company operated in Finland, Scandinavia, Baltic countries and Russia.

Lemminkäinen was merged with YIT in February 2018.

The company is named after the Finnish mythological figure Lemminkäinen.

== Controversies ==
Lemminkäinen and seven smaller companies were convicted of forming a price cartel to overcharge local authorities millions of euros for road paving work (asphalt). In 1999 the Supreme Administrative Court of Finland ruled that the companies colluded on prices and other matters at least between 1994 and 2002. Helsinki District Court was in November 2013 ordered the companies to pay the largest damages in Finnish legal history: 40m euros to forty Finnish municipalities. The Finnish Competition and Consumer Authority announced on 3 June 2014 that it would approve the deal.
