= Ottawa Trucks =

American automobile manufacturer

Kalmar Ottawa
- Formerly: Ottawa Trucks (1943-1993)
- Industry: Terminal tractors
- Founded: 1943
- Headquarters: Ottawa, Kansas, United States
- Products: Terminal Tractors, Tractor Service, formerly Custom Fire Apparatus Chassis
- Parent: Cargotec
- Website: www.kalmarottawa.com

Ottawa Trucks, later renamed Kalmar Ottawa, is a United States-based company which is the largest manufacturer of terminal tractors in North America, with over 55,000 produced. In 1990 the Ottawa Truck Corporation acquired Beck Fire Apparatus of Cloverdale, CA, which continued to operate as an independent division until going out of business in 1992. Ottawa Trucks was purchased by their main competitor, Finnish Sisu Terminal Systems, in 1993. In 1997 Sisu and Swedish terminal truck manufacturer Kalmar Industries were both incorporated into the Partek Corporation, and soon thereafter the "Sisu" badge was discontinued on terminal tractors.

In 2015, Ottawa partnered with Orange EV, a Missouri-based manufacturer of electric terminal tractors, to retrofit its yard trucks with electric engines. The companies decided to collaborate due to the demand for emission-free logistics.
