= Orange EV =

American electric terminal tractor manufacturer

- Type: Private
- Industry: Automotive industry, Electric vehicle manufacturing
- Founded: 2012; 14 years ago
- Founder: Kurt Neutgens, Wayne Mathisen
- Headquarters: Kansas City, Kansas, United States
- Products: Electric terminal tractors
- Website: orangeev.com

Orange EV is an American manufacturer of electric terminal tractors, also known as yard trucks, and is based in Kansas City, Kansas. Founded in 2012, the company was the first in the United States to commercially deploy electric terminal trucks, which are used for moving trailers in distribution centers, seaports, rail yards, and other container and trailer handling operations.

== History ==
Orange EV was established in 2012 by Kurt Neutgens and Wayne Mathisen in Kansas City, Kansas, to develop zero-emission terminal tractors. Mike Saxton joined them to lead business evolution and commercialization. The company introduced its prototype electric yard truck, the T-Series, in 2015, targeting logistics and distribution industries seeking to reduce emissions and fuel costs. By 2016, Orange EV had deployed trucks at major sites including those operated by DHL and Rail Management Services (RMS) of Carrix and for years led globally with the greatest # of commercially deployed and operating heavy-duty electric vehicles.

In 2022, Orange EV gained it first private equity investment and again relocated while expanding its manufacturing facility in Kansas City to meet growing demand, supported by federal and state incentives for electric vehicle adoption. The company received the 2023 Clean Energy Business Award from the Kansas City Area Development Council for its contributions to sustainable transportation. As of 2025, Orange EV’s trucks are used by logistics firms like NSSL Global and operate in over 40 U.S. states, with deployments at ports, warehouses, and intermodal facilities.

== Products ==
Orange EV manufactures electric terminal tractors, including the e-TRIEVER and HUSK-e models, designed for short-haul trailer movement in logistics, rail, and port operations. These trucks feature battery-electric powertrains, offering zero tailpipe emissions, reduced maintenance costs, and up to 24 hours of operation per charge. The company’s vehicles are equipped with regenerative braking and telematics for efficiency monitoring, competing with diesel-powered alternatives from manufacturers like Kalmar Industries.

== Impact and recognition ==
Orange EV’s electric yard trucks contribute to reduced greenhouse gas emissions and improved air quality in logistics hubs, aligning with U.S. clean energy goals. Studies highlight their role in electrifying port and warehouse operations, with deployments noted for reliability and cost savings. The company’s innovation has been recognized in industry reports and awards, including its leadership in zero-emission vehicle deployments.
