= V48 =

V48 may refer to:

- SMS V48, a torpedo boat of the Imperial German Navy
- Vanadium-48, an isotope of vanadium
- Vanaja V-48, a Finnish truck
- Vultee V-48, an American aircraft
