= Sisu Terminal Systems =

Sisu Terminal Systems Oy
- Trade name: Sisu; Magnum-Sisu; Magnum
- Company type: Osakeyhtiö
- Industry: automotive
- Founded: 1969 as LOB; 1989 as business unit 1994 as limited company
- Defunct: 1997
- Fate: Acquired by Partek
- Successor: Kalmar (Cargotec)
- Headquarters: Finland
- Number of locations: Hämeenlinna 1969–1996; Tampere 1996–1997
- Area served: worldwide
- Key people: Christer Schalin, Veikko Muronen, Bertel Lindberg
- Products: terminal tractors and compatible trailers
- Production output: ca. 2,600 units
- Parent: Oy Suomen Autoteollisuus Ab / Oy Sisu-Auto Ab / Sisu Corporation

Sisu Terminal Systems Oy (STS) was a Finnish terminal tractor producer. The production began in 1969 as a part of Suomen Autoteollisuus (SAT) and the first vehicles were based on lorry components. The portfolio grew by time. The production facilities were in Hämeenlinna until the mid 1990s, when they were moved to Tampere. The company produced terminal tractors also in Texas under the name Magnum in 1987–2005.

STS became a limited liability company in 1994 and was sold and restructured in 1997. Subsequently, the Sisu brand was replaced by Kalmar.

== History ==
=== Initial development ===
The first four prototypes were produced in 1969. The vehicles were type T-9SV and they were largely based on Kontio-Sisu lorry components. The customer was stevedoring company Oy Åkerman Ab.

In 1970 SAT started a development project jointly with consulting company Jaakko Pöyry for suitable vehicles for loading and unloading of ro-ro vessels. As a result, SAT launched a four-wheel-drive model TV-10 and its reversed steering version T-10 in 1971. 22 units were produced in the same year. A significant feature was its patented fifth wheel coupling system which enabled a quick a flexible engagement. The solution was developed by technician Nils Fagerstedt and it paved the success in export market.

After the promising start, the model selection was extended gradually; rear-wheel drive TV-12 came in 1974 and 4×4-model T-13 in 1977.

=== Creation of the business unit ===
DI Christer Schalin was appointed the Production Manager of the terminal tractor production line in 1979. He had previously worked as the Export Manager of SAT and started now to work hard to develop the terminal tractor business. Schalin expanded the export market and he also created the Sisu Terminal Systems name and logo.

=== Breakthrough ===
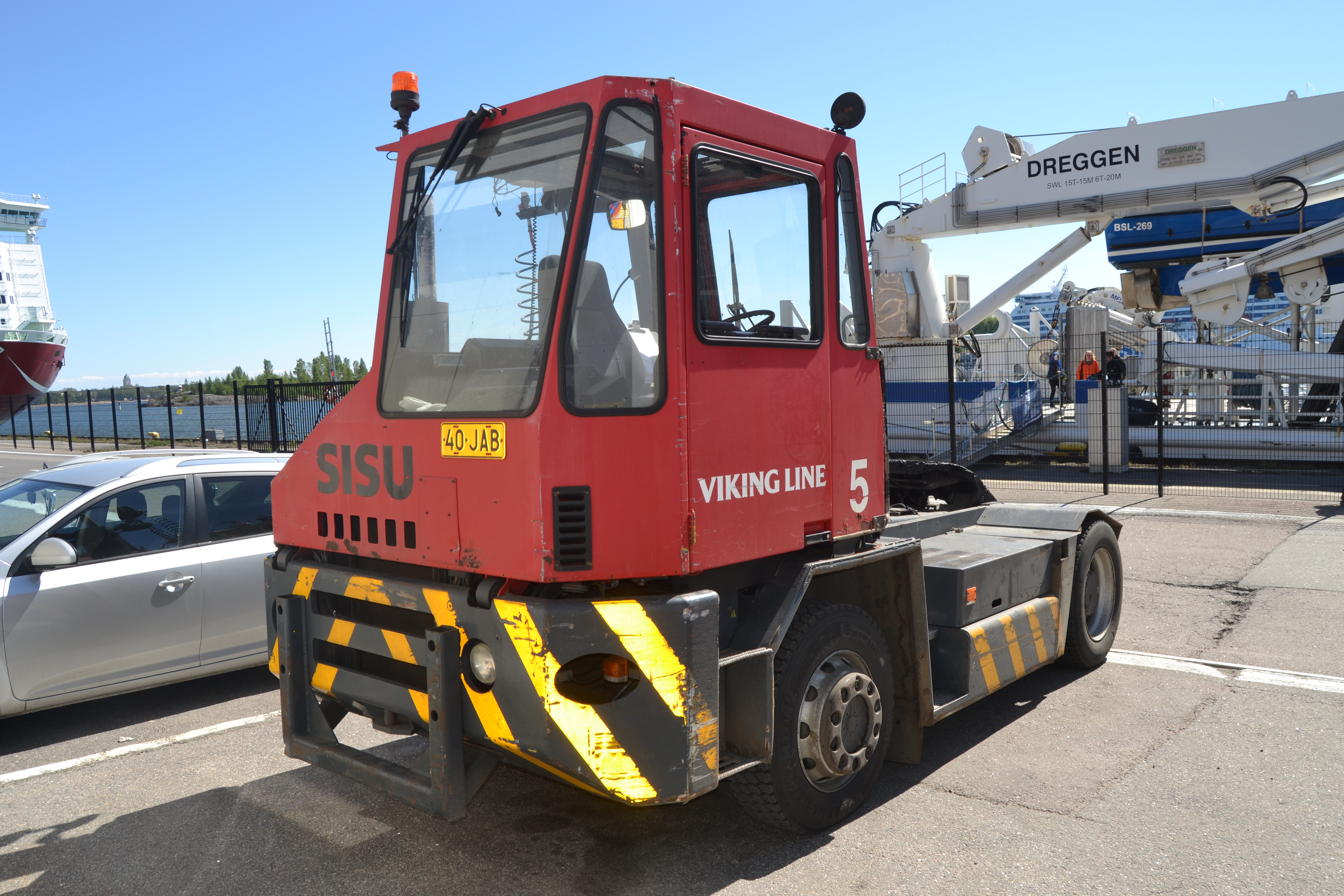
Sisu terminal tractor at Katajanokka quay in Helsinki.

In autumn 1980, Sisu TR-200, which was the world's strongest terminal tractor by then, was presented in Portex fair in Hamburg. The Sisu terminal tractors could be designed relatively easily according to the customer requirements due to highly modulised structure; this led to success in export markets in particular.

As the capacity of the Hämeenlinna factory could not meet the need time to time, some units were assembled in the Karis factory.

=== Magnum and Ottawa ===
Sisu-Auto founded a new terminal tractor factory in White Oak, Texas in 1987. The main responsibility of the project was on Heikki Luostarinen who later became the company General Manager. The vehicles were branded first Sisu, later Sisu-Magnum and at the end just Magnum. The factory was closed down in 2005 and production of Magnum terminal tractors was continued in other facilities.

In 1993 Sisu-Auto acquired Ottawa Truck Corporation which was its main competitor in North American market. Some trucks were sold with combined Sisu and Ottawa badging.

=== Organisational changes ===
The terminal tractors were separated from the other vehicle production under its own organisation in 1989. In 1991 Sisu Terminal Systems division was founded for the RoRo equipment manufacturing.

When Sisu Corporation was created as a consequence of merger between the owning Sisu-Auto and Valmet wheeled machines, STS became a limited liability company (Oy). As a part of the following restructuring the production was transferred gradually to former Valmet facilities in Tampere. The last terminal tractor produced in Hämeenlinna rolled out from the factory in January 1996.

The terminal tractor production totalled about 2,600 units by the production transfer. The vehicles produced in the Karis factory are included into the figures. In addition, hundreds of gooseneck trailers and other container carriages were produced.

A new acquisition followed in 1997 when Partek took over Sisu Corporation. At the same time Partek bought the Swedish container handling equipment producer Kalmar Industries, into which STS was joined. Use of Sisu brand on terminal tractors was discontinued thereafter, and the name kept on living as a lorry producer.

== Sources ==
- Blomberg, Olli. Yhteissisusta Vanajan ja Sisun kautta Patriaan [From Yhteissisu via Vanaja and Sisu to Patria] (in Finnish). Hämeenlinna: Patria Vehicles Oy. ISBN 952-91-5613-8.
- Blomberg, Olli. Suomalaista Sisua vuodesta 1931 – Monialaosaajasta kuorma-autotehtaaksi [Finnish Sisu since 1931 – From multi-industrial expert to lorry factory] (in Finnish). Karis: Oy Sisu Auto Ab. ISBN 952-91-4918-2.
