= Yard goat =

Yard goat can refer to:

- A slang term for a terminal tractor, used to tow trailers around a warehouse or yard
- A slang term for a switcher, which serves a similar function as a terminal tractor but is used on railcars
- The Hartford Yard Goats, a minor league baseball team.
