= Sisu S-21 =

Sisu S-21, S-22 and S-22K; Vanaja V-48
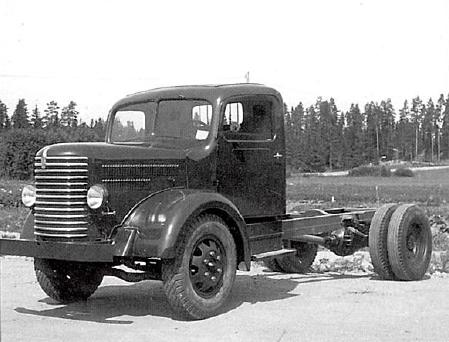
- Sisu S-22 made by Yhteissisu.

Overview
- Manufacturer: Oy Suomen Autoteollisuus Ab; Yhteissisu Oy (later Vanajan Autotehdas Oy)
- Production: 1943–1955
- Assembly: Helsinki and Vanaja (later Hämeenlinna), Finland

Body and chassis
- Body style: conventional cabin
- Layout: 4×2

Powertrain
- Engine: petrol engines: Sisu SA-5 / Tampella 6000; Cadillac 1G; Cadillac 6C-2; White 160AX; diesel engines: Kämper 4D10H; Leyland O.350; Saurer F-130

Dimensions
- Wheelbase: 3,980 mm (156.7 in)
- Length: 6,430 mm (253.1 in)
- Width: 2,240 mm (88.2 in)
- Kerb weight: 3,000 kg (6,614 lb)

Chronology
- Successor: SAT: Sisu K-23; VAT: Vanaja VK-series

Sisu S-21 is a lorry first produced by the Finnish heavy vehicle producer Suomen Autoteollisuus (SAT), then under names Sisu S-22 and S-22K by Yhteissisu, which, after changing its name Vanajan Autotehdas (VAT), produced it with name Vanaja V-48. The production period was 1943–1955.

The two-axle, 4×2-driven lorry has a kerb weight of 3,000 kg and gross weight of 7,000–8,000 kg, depending on version.

Sisu S-21 was developed during the Continuation War for the Finnish Defence Forces to be produced in relatively large quantities. Serial production was not run up before the war ended and the company founded for wartime production eventually produced vehicles for state organisations and private companies. Many of the post-war Vanaja-badged units were powered by American military surplus engines.

VAT replaced the model by 1951 presented Vanaja VK-series; in the meantime, SAT developed its follower named Sisu K-23.

== Background ==
Since its foundation, SAT had increased the level of domestic content in its products gradually. As the Winter War broke out, it became increasingly difficult to get foreign components. A big step forward was a licence agreement with the American Hercules Engine Company, after which SAT started to produce its own engines. In 1942 came the first entirely Finnish-made components built Sisu S-15.

During the Continuation War in 1942 Finnish Defence Forces estimated that it will need 7,000 lorries and buses within the following years. Purchasing of vehicles from abroad was not possible due to lack of currency reserves. SAT, the only domestic vehicle producer, did not have enough of technical and economical resources for a such large scale production, although the company was building a new facility in Karis. The manager of SAT, Tor Nessling, suggested as a solution extending the capacity plan in Karis, but certain cliques suspected that SAT tried to benefit from the war. Nessling, who was also the main owner of SAT, ruled out the offer of the state becoming a co-owner in the company. Therefore, a new lorry producer, Yhteissisu, was started in 1943 under leadership of the state. In addition to the state, the company owners were SAT and a number of other Finnish industrial companies.

== Production transfer agreement ==
As soon as the new company was set up, its management started negotiations about technical specifications. Planning of a completely new vehicle was out of question due to lack of time. SAT introduced in the same year new model, S-21. It was technically outdated, but the best available option.

The agreement about the Sisu S-21 production transfer between SAT and Yhteissisu was signed off on 8 June 1943. SAT committed to hand over to Yhteissisu the needed drawings, other production documents and list of subsuppliers. Yhteissisu also got the right to use the Sisu brand in its products for five years. In the meantime, SAT was not allowed to produce lorries, apart from the 120 units on its order log.

The supply contract between Yhteissisu and state was signed in the same day. Yhteissisu committed to build up capability to produce initially at least 1,000 lorries per year; the annual capacity was to be increased up to 2,000 units after three years. Simultaneously, the state placed a committing order for 2,000 Sisu S-21 lorries. The first batch of 300 units was scheduled to 1944, after which the annual quantity was to be increased to 700, and the remaining 1,000 were to be delivered by the end of 1946.

After the agreement SAT concentrated on bus chassis production. However, some of the S-15 chassis were equipped with lorry cabin and superstructures.

According to the contract the production had to be started directly, and as no other facilities were available, the first Yhteissisu vehicles were built under a separate bookkeeping at SAT works in Fleming street, Helsinki. SAT had the right to produce 120 units under its own bookkeeping; however, the number of SAT-produced Yhteissisu vehicles is not known but based on the production figures it was only few units.

== Moving to Vanaja ==
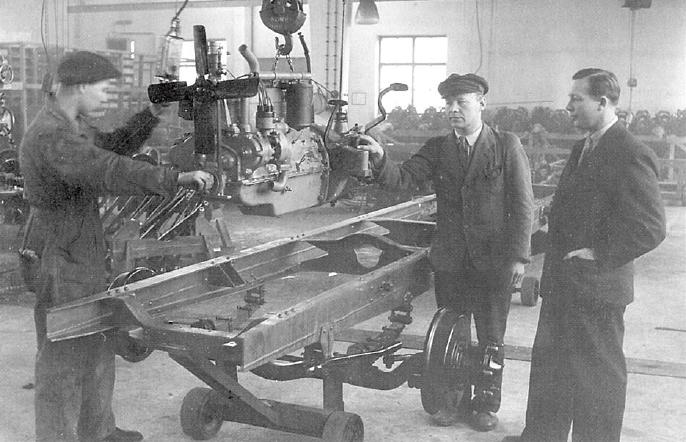
Mounting of an engine on chassis in Yhteissisu. The material shortage can be seen on the frame profile which is made by welding two L-profile beams together.

Yhteissisu finally found a suitable area for vehicle production in municipality of Vanaja, next to Hämeenlinna, where it built a facility of 25,000 m^{2}. The first prototype built in the new factory rolled out from the production line on 1 August 1945. Different from the SAT production, the model produced in the new factory was named S-22. After a short but intense testing period the serial production was started on 29 October. During the testing it came out that the lorry could not be tested at its full eight tonnes load because the maximum weight on the nearby road was limited to seven tonnes. Test run was finally permitted after the company was granted a licence to drive overweight for testing purposes. The main difference between the SAT and Yhteissisu produced lorries was in wheel bearings; the S-21 used imperial units, whereas the S-22 was with metric bearings.

The first serial produced vehicle was scheduled for 8 November and it was prepared to be a showy media event, but due to material shortage, lack of workforce and quality issues the serial production could not be started before early 1946.

== Initial problems ==
At the beginning Yhteissisu production was dependent on availability of German components; gearboxes and steering gears were from ZF, rims from Kronprinz, cardan shafts from Rheinmetall and Bosch supplied electrical equipment. These were later replaced by number of domestic options. The gearboxes were produced by Rosenlew, electrical equipment came from Strömberg, Hackman & Co. made rims, Fiskars produced leaf springs, the engines were made by SAT and Tampereen Pellava- ja Rautateollisuus, of which the latter one produced also front axles. Valtion lentokonetehdas made cabins and cardan shafts, Valtion Tykkitehdas steering gears, rear axle housings and wheel hubs came from Ahlström, drive shafts from Lokomo and rubber parts, including tyres, from Suomen Gummitehdas.

However, the quality of the domestic components was generally not very good. Most of the issues were tracked back to poor raw materials.

The serial production began very slowly. The total number of produced vehicles was just 147 units in 1946, which was way less than the 2,000 vehicles that the company had promised to produce for the state. The original calculated price, 765,000 marks, could not be reached; the lorry cost finally 800,000 marks which was too high minding the technical properties of S-22. What is more important, the war was over and the Defence Forces had to reduce the number of vehicles based on the peace treaty, so buying new ones was out of question. The state terminated the purchasing contract with Yhteissisu from end of 1946.

The termination of contract hardly came as a surprise to Yhteissisu, as already in May 1946 the company had agreed with the state about selling to civil market such vehicles which the state would not purchase. A distribution network with 12 representatives in the most important cities was set up for lorry sales; the organisation was generally based on SAT network.

The total sales reached 103 units in 1947; only 55 were produced in the whole year, as 48 vehicles, which were produced in 1946 were sold just in the following year.

== Sisu S-22K ==
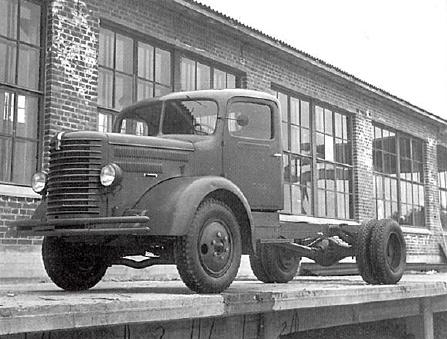
Sisu S-22K.

Yhteissisu presented in May 1946 a model which was more suitable to the civil market. Sisu S-22K had its premier in Domestic Industry Fair in Helsinki. The letter K came from kevyt, "light"; the total weight was just 7 tonnes instead of eight tonnes, the front bumper was substituted by a lighter one, the wheel size was smaller and the army standard towing bracket was left off.

== Vanaja V-48 ==
According to the original contract between SAT and Yhteissisu, the right to use Sisu brand was granted to Yhteissisu until 8 June 1948. The company was renamed Vanajan Autotehdas and the vehicle brand was selected Vanaja. The new model name was V-48. The new make was taken to use from the date when the licence ended. However, ten semi-finished vehicles were delivered as Sisu's, as the customers had ordered them such, after a special permit from SAT. Few very last S-22 lorries were branded Vanaja S-22. The number of produced Sisu S-22 and S-22K totalled 294 pieces, which was way less than the originally planned 7,000 units.

Vanajan Autotehdas signed a new contract with the state for vehicles which would be delivered in 1948–1952. The total quantity was then 650 units and the state gave a significant prepayment of 132 million marks. The first 150 lorries scheduled for 1948 were delivered timely. In addition, 11 lorries were sold to private users, which means that the total production in 1948 was 161 lorries. 92 of them were still sold as Sisu S-22 and the rest 69 were Vanaja V-48's.

The company General Manager Eero Kytölä, travelled twice to Germany and France for component purchasing in 1947 and 1948. He made an agreement of buying a large amount of surplus material of Western Allies. This included over 10,000 GMC lorry rims, 304 Cadillac V8 petrol engines of which 30 with gearboxes and 186 White petrol engines. Subsequently, these materials were used for Vanaja's.

Although the replacing VK-series entered market in 1951, V-48 was produced until 1955.

== Technical data ==
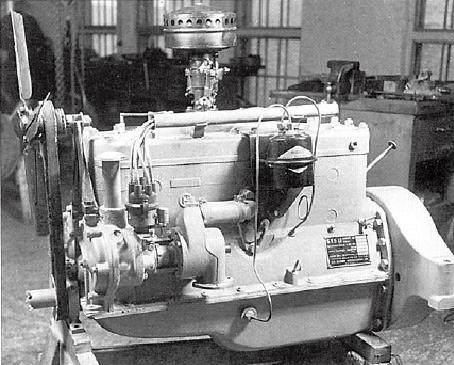
Sisu AMG / SA-5, a licence-built Hercules JXC.

=== Engine ===
The original engine was SAT-produced a six-cylinder inline engine Sisu AMG, which was a licence produced American Hercules JXC. The Yhteissisu code for the engine was SA-5. The displacement was approximately five litres and the output was 90 hp at 2600 rpm. The same engine was also produced by Tampereen Pellava- ja Rautateollisuus under name Tampella 6000.

The basic Vanaja V-48 had either Tampella 6000 or Cadillac 6C-2 as a power source. V-48 CdA was equipped with Cadillac 1G. Soon also diesel engines became available, and the first diesels were made by Kämper and Saurer; V-48 CdF was powered by Kämper 4D10H or Leyland O.350, V-48 CdFk had White 160 AX, Leyland O.350 or Saurer F-130.

=== Transmission ===
At the beginning the gearboxes were produced by ZF, after this by a domestic producer Rosenlew. Later gearboxes were produced in Valmet Rautpohja factory; this type was copied from the American Fuller gearboxes.

The rear axle was assembled in-house. The gears were produced by the Ata company.

=== Cabin ===
The cabins were produced by Valtion Lentokonetehdas; there were few cabin types which differed slightly from each other.

== Characteristics ==
On the purchasing agreement between the state and Yhteissisu the vehicle requirements were specified in detail. The vehicle kerb weight was 3,000 kg. Two platform lengths were specified: the shorter one, with 3,900 mm long platform, had a gross weight of 8,000 kg and the longer one with 4,140-mm platform was rated with 8,000 kg gross weight. The width was 2,200 mm and chassis length 6,440 mm. Wheelbase was determined 3,980 mm; the front track was 1,740 mm and rear track 1,730 mm.

The 1946 presented light version S-22K had total weight of 7,000 kg.

== Sources ==
- Blomberg, Olli (2003). Yhteissisusta Vanajan ja Sisun kautta Patriaan (in Finnish). Hämeenlinna: Patria Vehicles Oy. ISBN 952-91-5613-8.
- Mäkipirtti, Markku (2008). Vanaja. Ajoneuvot Suomessa (in Finnish). Vol. 1 (1. ed.). Tampere: Apali Oy. ISBN 978-952-5026-72-6.
- Mäkipirtti, Markku (2011). Sisu. Ajoneuvot Suomessa (in Finnish). Vol. 4 (2. ed.). Tampere: Apali Oy. ISBN 978-952-5877-05-2.
