= Vanaja VAKS =

Vanaja VAKS (AS-33)
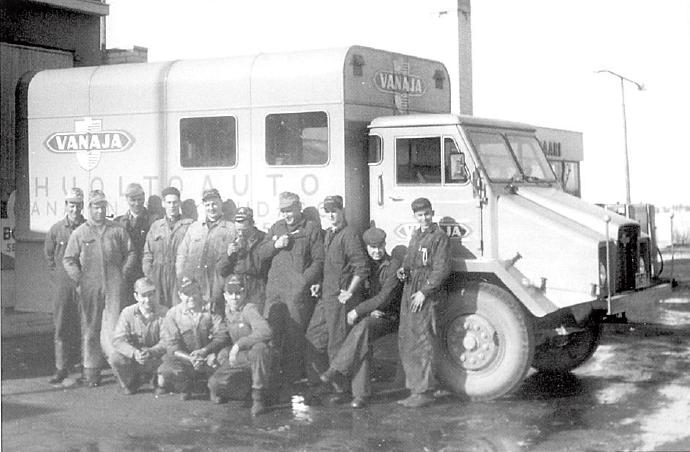
- VAT's own service vehicle, Vanaja AS-21B, exceptionally with a Leyland engine.

Overview
- Manufacturer: Vanajan Autotehdas Oy
- Production: 1960–1963

Body and chassis
- Class: light military lorry
- Layout: 4×2

Powertrain
- Engine: Ford Trader 510E 6-cyl. diesel; Bedford J4 petrol engine; Bedford D4
- Transmission: gearbox: Fuller 5B-330; rear axle: Timken TJ-140

Dimensions
- Wheelbase: 3 600 mm, 4 000 mm or 4 600 mm
- Length: 6,500 mm (255.9 in) (with standard wheelbase of 3 600 mm)
- Height: 2,500 mm (98.4 in)

Vanaja VAKS, later called Vanaja AS-33 is a two-axle, 4×2-driven military lorry produced by the Finnish heavy vehicle producer Vanajan Autotehdas (VAT) in 1960–1963. The biggest customer was Finnish Defence Forces.

== Use ==
The first seven units were handed over to the Finnish Defence Forces on 9 December 1960; however, the measurement drawings were dated just on 31 December, i.e. after the first lorries were already taken into use. The Defence Forces ordered 155 units in total. Most of the vehicles were stationed in transportation units.

In the model name VAK stands for Vanaja lorry and S means soldier or military. VAT changed its model nomenclature system in 1961 after which the VAK was replaced by A. S remained indicating that the model was designated mainly for military use. A number was added to show the engine type; the volume model was with 330 cubic inch Ford Trader engine and therefore named AS-33.

== Technical data ==
=== Engine ===
The first models were powered by Ford Trader 510E six-cylinder, 108-hp diesels. In addition, two Bedford petrol engines were used: 3.52-litre Bedford J4 and 4.9-litre Bedford D4 of which latter were only produced three units. Two units were powered by Leyland 0.375 and one by Leyland 0.400.

=== Transmission ===
The gearbox is produced by Fuller and the type is 5B-330. The rear axle is Timken TJ-140.

== Sources ==
- Mäkipirtti, Markku (2008). Vanaja. Ajoneuvot Suomessa (in Finnish). Vol. 1 (1st ed.). Tampere: Apali Oy. ISBN 978-952-5026-72-6.
