= Veikko Muronen =

Finnish engineer (1927–2006)

- Born: 21 October 1927; Viipuri, Finland
- Died: 13 January 2006 (aged 78); Helsinki, Finland
- Citizenship: Finnish
- Education: diplomi-insinööri
- Spouse: Ulla née Sipilä
- Parent(s): Ivan Mironov; Tanja née Fadjukov
- Engineering career
- Employer(s): Vanajan Autotehdas, Suomen Autoteollisuus, Wiima and others
- Projects: rolling air bellows suspension system, Vanaja lift axle system
- Significant design: Vanaja T6-69 cabin

Veikko Muronen (21 October 1927 – 13 January 2006) was a Finnish MSc (diplomi-insinööri) and heavy vehicle designer. He worked as a manager of the Engineering Department of Vanajan Autotehdas (VAT) and later Suomen Autoteollisuus (SAT). Muronen is best known as the inventor of Vanaja lifting tandem system and designer of the last Vanaja series, "Muros-Vanaja".

== Early life and studies ==
Muronen's parents were Ivan Mironov and Tanja née Fadjukov. After graduating from Hämeenlinna upper secondary school in 1946 Muronen went to study mechanical engineering in Tampere University of Technology. He graduated in 1953. He started his career in VTT as researcher after which he was employed by A. Ahlström Varkaus factory, where he worked as designer.

== Career in Vanaja ==
By the end of 1950's competition in heavy vehicle market had got harder; the post-war shortage was over and the supply of heavy vehicles had grown. In 1955 Vanajan Autotehdas in Hämeenlinna was seeking for a person who could design a good logging vehicle. Muronen got the post. He started as a chief engineer and later he became production manager in the factory.

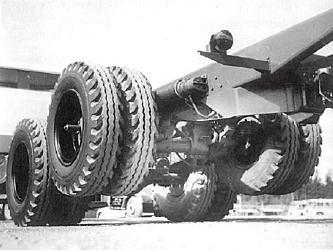
An initial version of the Vanaja lifting tandem system. The lifting mechanism is operated by two powerful hydraulic cylinders mounted on both sides of the frame.

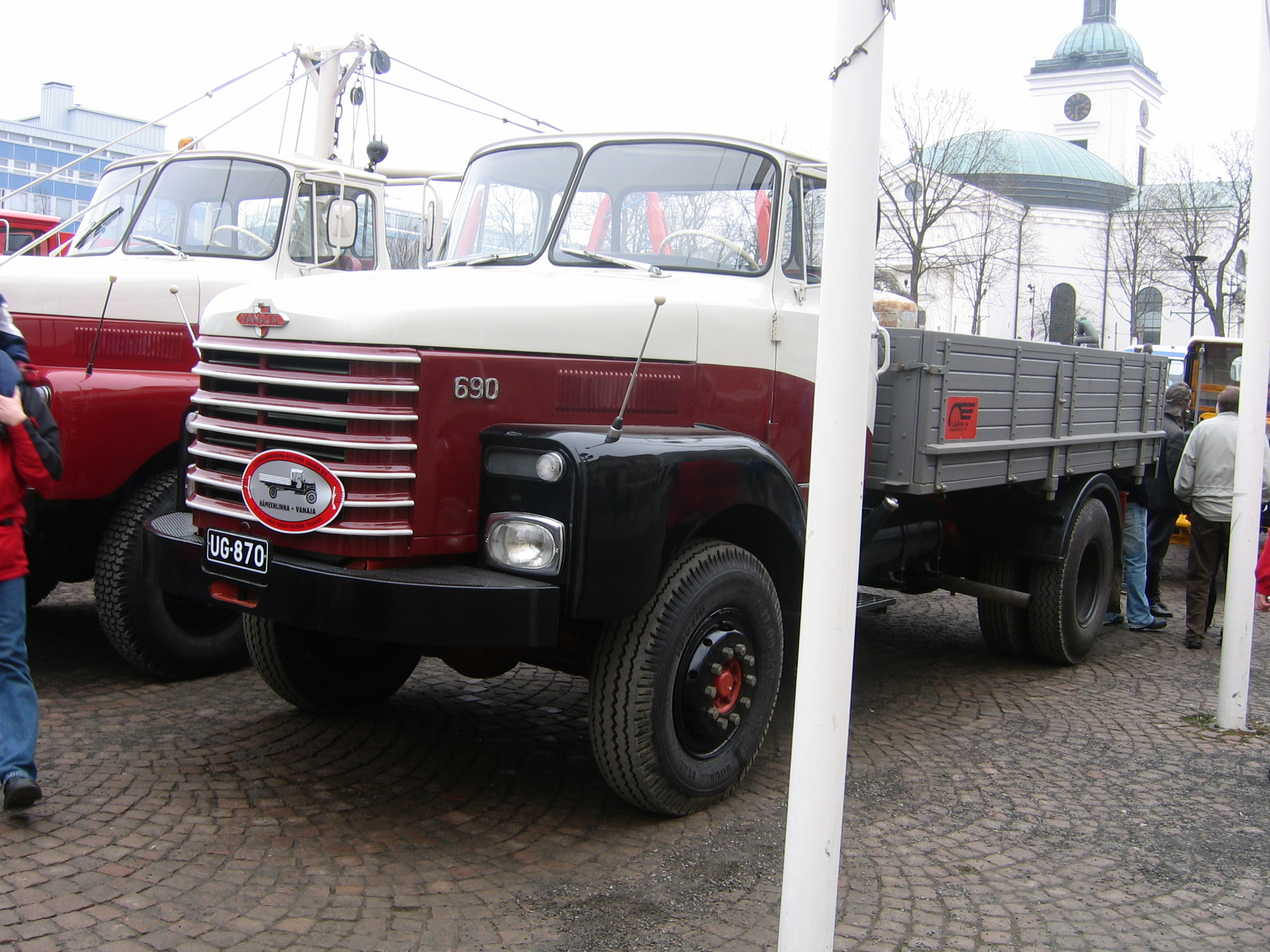
Vanaja N6-69, which was produced 1966–1970. Muronen designed the cabin together with his wife Ulla. The model got nickname "Muros-Vanaja" after Muronen.

The most important innovation of Muronen, Vanaja's full-load lifting tandem axle system, was represented in January 1957. The innovation was preponderant compared to the similar systems of the competitors.

Afterwards Muronen named Vanaja T6-69/5000+1200 his most important work. The vehicle was powered by turbocharged AEC AVT690 engine, 15-speed Fuller RTO915 gearbox and Muronen's hydraulically operated lifting tandem. The lorry was regarded as a successful combination.

Muronen participated also in bus chassis designing. in 1968 VAT introduced model LK6-69 with a horizontally mounted AEC AH 691 engine and a so-called rolling suspension bellows suspension. The rear axle was equipped with four air bellows when the competitors' corresponding systems only included two bellows. The solution improved passenger comfort significantly.

Shortly after VAT merged with Suomen Autoteollisuus Muronen was appointed to lead the Engineering department of the new SAT organisation.

The Vanaja lifting tandem axle system was adopted to Sisu's after the merger. SAT took some attempts of co-operation with other heavy vehicle producers to produce the lifting tandem also for other makes, but only few lifting tandems were mounted on Iveco's in the Hämeenlinna factory.

Muronen's lifting tandem is still in use in Sisu products.

== Later career ==
Muronen moved to bus coach factory Wiima in 1982. He worked as technical director. After that he worked as public transport system consultant before he retired: in 1982–1987 Muronen lead first Portuguese, then Saudi Arabian and finally Brazilian bus factories. He worked for a short time as project manager in Iisalmi and supervised reorganising of production in a Greek bus factory.

== Private life ==
Muronen had two children with his wife Ulla. He tended to spend his free time in his summer cottage together with his family. Muronen got a private pilot licence in 1960's.
