= Engineer's degree =

Advanced academic degree in engineering

An engineer's degree is an advanced academic degree in engineering which is conferred in Europe, some countries of Asia and Latin America, North Africa and a few institutions in the United States. The degree may require a thesis but always requires a non-abstract project. The duration of study typically ranges from 4 to 5 years, depending on the country and university. Additionally, there may be further requirements for certifications or licenses to practice engineering after graduation.

== North America ==
=== United States ===
In the United States, the engineer's degree requires a year of study beyond a master's degree or two years from a bachelor's degree and often includes a requirement for a research thesis.

At the U.S. Naval Postgraduate School the thesis is required to be "more extensive and complete in problem scope and solution than a master's thesis", although "not necessarily meeting the test of original research and contribution to fundamental knowledge that is applied to PhD dissertations." At UCLA, the engineer degree is explicitly set at the level of the preliminary PhD examination, i.e. not including the contribution to fundamental knowledge.

The engineer's degree was originally a first degree at the same level as a bachelor's degree. Rensselaer Polytechnic Institute was empowered by its 1824 charter to award Civil Engineer and Topographical Engineer degrees alongside the Bachelor in Science, and awarded the first Civil Engineer degrees in 1835. Civil Engineer degrees were also awarded by Dartmouth College (from 1845), the University of Michigan (from 1855) and by Yale University (from 1860), while Columbia University awarded Engineer of Mines degrees from 1867. By the early 20th-century engineer's degrees were commonly at graduate level – a survey by a committee of the Association of American Universities in 1916 found that this was the case in over two-thirds of the universities surveyed. The committee recommended that engineer's degrees be reserved for study beyond master's level.

=== Mexico ===
The engineer's degree in Mexico is typically a long-cycle program that extends beyond the level of a master's degree and serves as a professional qualification for licensure. It is generally considered a terminal professional degree within the Mexican higher education system.

In international contexts, the equivalence of this qualification varies and is not uniformly defined. Some sources note differences in translation and professional titles; for example, bilingual dictionaries such as Collins may render "ingeniero" as "engineer" or, in certain contexts, associate it with advanced professional status. The international Engineering alliance graduate attributes and professional competencies gives the qualifications and credentials of the professional engineer in all the signatory countries Mexico and Chile included. The Unirank system can be used to determine the level of a five-year engineering program from an accredited and reputable school. For example, the engineering program at the University of Quintana Roo goes from bachelor's to doctoral level according to the degree matrix level.

== Latin America ==
In Latin America, a degree or title of "Ingeniero" is awarded after completing five years of college. This may be translated as "Engineer", however, its international academic equivalence depends on each country's educational system and can be compared to a six-year post-master's degree. Its award may imply obtaining a state licence to legally practice in the field or a professional certification outside the academic environment.

=== Argentina, Chile, Uruguay ===
Argentina, Chile and Uruguay's higher education systems differ from the US model, with a six-year "Título Profesional en Ingeniería" granting the title of engineer. This professional title encompasses a bachelor's degree in science, allowing graduates to enter a master's or doctoral program. Alternatively, graduates can proceed directly to a doctorate after the six-year program. Therefore, this professional title in engineering is academically equivalent to a six-year post-master's degree.

== Europe ==
Prior to the Bologna Process, In most countries of continental Europe, universities specializing in technical fields traditionally awarded their students an engineer's degree after five years. This degree was typically the first university-awarded degree after finishing secondary education and completing it granted qualifications to further pursue a doctorate.

Following German custom in higher education, the engineer's degree was called the Diplom. In addition to Germany itself, this system was common in states like Albania, Austria, Belarus, Belgium, Bosnia and Herzegovina, Bulgaria, Croatia, Czech Republic, Finland, Greece, Hungary, Montenegro, the Netherlands, Poland, Portugal, Romania, Russia, Serbia, Slovakia, Slovenia, Spain, and Switzerland.

Following the introduction of the Bologna process, universities divide higher-education studies in three cycles, corresponding to a three to four-year bachelor's degree, a one to two-year master's degree and a doctoral degree. Accordingly, engineering studies are now divided in two parts: first, the bachelor's degree (baccalaureus, three to four years) and the second optional part (one to two years), after which either the traditional engineer's degree or a master's degree (e.g. MEng or MSc) is awarded. These can often, however, still be combined into a single 'integrated' degree programme in many countries, normally lasting five or six years (although only four years in England, Wales and Northern Ireland). But in the UK when one considers the whole formation of a fully qualified Chartered Engineer or Incorporated Engineer it is a minimum of eight years. Countries have varied in the implementation of the Bologna process, meaning the combination of first (bachelor's) and second (master's) cycles, even when taken as a single degree, can last from four to six years, although many countries have set five years as the minimum.

Most traditional universities continue to have a primary academic degree program, for example, a five-year Civilingenjör in Sweden, that is distinct from the 3+2 scheme that awards the bachelor's and master's degrees but a student who has done both at a Swedish technical university will in most cases also fulfill the requirements for the civilingenjör degree.

In France, an important part of engineering is taught in écoles d'ingénieurs, which are part of the French grandes écoles system. Since the Bologna Process, the Diplôme d'ingénieur is officially considered to be at the level of a master's degree, equivalent to an integrated bachelor's and master's degree.

In German, the traditional engineer's degree is called Diplom-Ingenieur (Dipl. -Ing.; in Austria DI is also used). This degree is generally equivalent to a combined bachelor's and Master's degree, which is not to be confused with the old Magister degree.

Europe has the international professional engineering qualification and title of European Engineer (EUR ING) which is obtained through peer review after seven years of education, training and professional experience.

=== Belarus and Ukraine ===
In Belarus and Ukraine, the degree is спеціаліст інженер (specialist engineer), a first degree after five years of education.

=== Belgium ===
In Flanders, Brussels and Wallonia, somebody holding an engineer's degree is an ingenieur/ingénieur. There are two types of engineers with different abbreviations:

- "Civil Engineer" (ir.), is obtained at university (faculty of engineering or faculty of bioscience engineering). Five years study (3 B.Sc. + 2 M.Sc.).
- "Industrial Engineer" (ing.) is a university degree but obtained in "haute-ecole" in Brussels and Wallonia, or at university for Flanders. Five years study (3 B.Sc. + 2 M.Sc.) for Brussels and Walllonia and four years study (3 B.Sc. + 1 M.Sc.) for Flanders.

Usually, civil engineering studies are considered more conceptual and theoretical, whereas industrial engineering programs are considered more practical, with less focus on theoretical explanations. However, in Wallonia and Brussels, following the standardisation to a 5-year curriculum, both paths now tend to share similar content and theoretical depth. The main distinction lies in how the subject matter is taught and learnt, although some specialised, advanced courses—such as aeronautical structures—are even taught jointly.

Furthermore, both paths allow students to pursue a Ph.D. or a complementary Master's degree (such as an MBA), particularly given this 5-year alignment in Brussels and Wallonia.

Names are traditionally prefixed with the ir. or ing. titles. Use of these titles is regulated and protected by law.

=== Croatia, Bosnia-Herzegovina, North Macedonia, Montenegro, Serbia (former Yugoslavia) ===
In Croatia, the old system included the engineer's degrees diplomirani inženjer (abbr. dipl.ing.) which was awarded by university faculties and a lower ranked engineer's degree inženjer (abbr. ing.) which was awarded by polytechnics, in a similar vein to the situation in the Netherlands. The old dipl.ing. degree could later be upgraded to a magistar (abbr. mr., Magister degree) and then a doktor (abbr. dr., Doctorate). The situation was the same in other countries previously part of Yugoslavia. In Serbian, the abbreviation is dipl.inž. Serbian titles of magistar (abbr. mr, Magister degree) and doktor (abbr. dr, Doctorate) in abbreviated versions are used without full stop as a punctuation mark at the end.

=== Czech Republic, Poland and Slovakia ===
In the western Slavic-speaking countries, the engineer's degree is called inżynier (Polish), inžinier (Slovak) or inženýr (Czech) and the abbreviation is inż. in Poland and Ing. in the Czech Republic and Slovakia, which may be written before the person's name.

In the Czech Republic and Slovakia, the degree of Ing. is given for complete university studies in technical (like engineering), economic or agricultural fields. In one of these cases it can be equivalent to a Master of Science in Engineering.

In Poland, the degree of inżynier is available after 3.5 or 4 years of studies (like the licencjat in non-engineering science) after a final thesis is completed. A magister inżynier (abbreviated mgr inż.) refers to a Master of Science in Engineering, after completing five years of study and a written thesis. Originally there were "inżynier" studies that lasted for four years and afterward one could obtain the "magister" title in two years of studies—the total of six years resulted in two degrees, "magister" and "inżynier". In the early 1960s a new track of studies was developed to speed up education and the "magister inżynier" five-year track was created. Whichever way one obtained the education the "magister inżynier" (mgr inż. before the name) was the equivalent degree with "inżynier" designating the professional level and "magister" designating the academic level. After the Bologna process the first level is "inżynier," obtainable after nominally three years of studies (although some are longer) with the same professional privileges as before and "masters" after one or two years gives the same academic and professional designation as before. But the ultimate shortening of the period of studies resulted in some professional groups (e.g. architects) demanding that "magister inżynier" be made a basis for professional rights.

=== Finland ===
In Finnish, the engineer's degree is called diplomi-insinööri and abbreviated dipl.ins., DI or M.Sc.(Tech.). It is possible to obtain after five years of studying or even faster, but the average is around six years. Under the Bologna process, this is split into two parts, the first being one where the students can get the intermediate tekniikan kandidaatti (B.Sc.(Tech.)) degree.

The degree of insinööri (AMK) is a bachelor's degree from a Finnish University of Applied Sciences (ammattikorkeakoulu), similar to a German Fachhochschule, but it is not interchangeable with the academic tekniikan kandidaatti.

Due to the Bologna process, a new master's degree called Insinööri (ylempi AMK) or Master of Engineering has been introduced. It carries a requirement of two years of work experience after the degree of insinööri (AMK) and further studies.

=== France ===
In France, the main way to become an engineer is :

- Have a Diplôme d'Ingénieur, delivered by the grandes écoles (or some technical universities), or have a Master's degree in Engineering from a University.

The Diplôme d'Ingénieur is a postgraduate degree in engineering usually awarded by the grandes écoles in engineering. It is generally obtained after five to seven years of studies after the baccalauréat. It is considered more prestigious by recruiters than a Master's degree due to the electricity of the program.

In France, the "Diplôme d'Ingénieur" grants the title of "ingénieur diplômé," a distinction from the less regulated term "ingénieur." This diploma is equivalent to a combined Bachelor and Master of Science in Engineering, recognized in the US and EU. Graduates can pursue double degrees, doctoral studies, and careers in academia or industrial research. In France, any institution issuing the Diplôme d'Ingénieur must be accredited by the state. In France particularly, the Diplôme d'Ingénieur must be accredited by the Commission des Titres d'Ingénieur. Note that the best institutions are usually part of the Conférence des Grandes écoles.

France is unusual in that it is mainly the grandes écoles in engineering that are accredited and are certified to issue the Diplôme d'Ingénieur, which is differentiated from bachelor's and master's degrees in engineering issued by public universities (universités). Universities in France are comprehensive institutions composed of several faculties covering various fields (natural sciences, engineering, law, economics, medicine, humanities, etc.) with a large student body. On the other hand, grandes écoles in engineering are much smaller and recruit their students through a more selective process (typically a few hundred students per year per institution, and a few thousand students per year country-wide).

=== Germany and Austria ===
In German, the traditional engineer's degree is called Diplom-Ingenieur (Dipl.-Ing.; in Austria DI is also used). This degree is generally equivalent to a Master's degree, which is not to be confused with the old Magister degree. The German "universities of applied sciences" (Fachhochschule) awarded the traditional engineering degree Diplom-Ingenieur (FH) (Dipl.-Ing. (FH)). This superseded "Ing. (Grad)", which was previously awarded by universities of applied sciences and engineering schools after three years of study. A requirement for the degree was to write a Diplom thesis. Most programs that used to lead to a Dipl.-Ing. degree lead to master's degrees today, as the Diplom-Ingenieur as an academic title is phased out because of the Bologna Process. However, some universities continue to hand out so-called equivalence certificates that certify the equivalence of a Dipl.-Ing. with the newly introduced MSc degrees. Since 2009, most universities in Germany offer bachelor's degree programmes (BSc, BEng and others) and master's programmes that lead to the academic degrees such as Master of Science, Master of Engineering, Master of Business Administration and others.

In Austria there also exists the Ingenieur (abbreviated as Ing.). This is not an academic degree as it is given to graduates of HTLs (Höhere Technische Lehranstalt), secondary schools with technical focus. The Austrian engineers' law (Ingenieurgesetz 2017) specifies the criteria for obtaining the title: graduation from a technical high school (HTL), verifiable practical experience of three years, and an oral examination with a certified committee to prove advanced skills and knowledge in their field. Since 2017, Ingenieur titles obtained under these criteria are included in the National Qualifications Framework on level 6, the same level as that of the bachelor's degree. However, the Ingenieur does not entitle holders to direct admission to university master's degree programmes.

=== Greece ===
In Greece, the title of "Engineer" is awarded by higher education institutions. There are two types of engineer. The title "Diplomate Engineer" (Diplomate in Greek: Διπλωματούχος; Kάτοχος ενός Διπλώματος/Δίπλωμα/Diploma; Diploma holder) is awarded after completion of a five-year undergraduate engineering degree (diploma) programme at a polytechnic university. These degrees are 300 ECTS credits, leading to a qualification at ISCED level 7, equivalent to an integrated master's degree.

The title of "Graduate Engineer"(Greek translation: "Πτυχιούχος Μηχανικός", English explanation: "Bachelor of Engineering Degree Holder"), is awarded after completion of a four-year (three and a half years from 1983 to 1995) undergraduate engineering degree programme at a technological educational institute (TEI). These are 240 (previously 210, 1983–1995) ECTS credits leading to an award at ISCED level 6, equivalent to a bachelor's degree. TEIs existed from 1983 to 2019; they were reformed between 2013 and 2019 and their departments incorporated into existing higher education institutions.

=== Italy ===
In Italy there was the engineering degree obtained after five years university and then one had to pass a state examination to be a professional engineer by law. Completion of an engineering degree has historically demanded much effort, so that, on average, the five-year course took eight years to finish and less than 5% of the students graduated within five years.

Later, until 2001, there were two degrees: a three-year diploma in ingegneria (BEng level, title abbrev. "dipl. ing.") and a five-year laurea in ingegneria (MEng level, title abbrev. "ing."). However, the two degree courses were not in sequence but one as an alternative to the other (most students attended the traditional five-year degree). Since 2001 reform, the bachelor's level is called laurea (abbrev. "L") and master's degree level was called laurea specialistica (abbrev. "LS") and is now called laurea magistrale (abbrev. "LM"). Accordingly, today after three years of engineering studies, the degree called laurea in ingegneria (BEng level) and the title of dottore in Ingegneria (abbrev. "dott.") can be obtained. After two additional years of engineering studies, the degree called laurea magistrale in ingegneria (MEng level) and the title of dottore magistrale in Ingegneria (abbrev. "dott.") can be obtained. After a "state exam" one becomes "Ingegnere" (abbrev. Ing). In Italy the state accreditation system, degrees and titles are regulated by state law.

=== Netherlands ===
In the Netherlands, somebody holding an engineer's degree is an ingenieur. There are two types of engineer with different abbreviations:

- ing. is obtained by graduates from polytechnics (hoger beroeps onderwijs or HBO) – four years' study (4 B.Eng. or B.ASc.)
- ir. is obtained by university graduates (Wetenschappelijk onderwijs or WO). It is at academic level and the highest engineer qualification – five years' study (3 B.Sc. + 2 M.Sc.), or six years for engineers that graduated prior to the Bologna agreement.

Names are traditionally prefixed with the ir. or ing. titles. Use of these titles is regulated and protected by Dutch law. Under the Bologna agreement, the titles are increasingly interchanged with the English-language degrees (B.Sc. for ing., M.Sc. for ir.).

Completion of Dutch engineering qualifications has historically demanded much effort and talent. On average the four-year course takes four and a half years to finish.

=== Romania and Moldova ===
Romania and Moldova followed the French system. One needs a baccalaureate diploma to be accepted at the university. The engineering degree was called Diploma de inginer and the graduate was called a Inginer diplomat. These five years of study are equivalent to a Bologna Master (M.Sc/M.Eng/MCA). The five-year course concludes with a comprehensive set of specialising exams (examen de diploma). Marks nine and 10 are considered exceptional. Some universities had called Diploma de Sub-inginer which was a three-year course equivalent with a college degree. Following the Bologna process, the graduates obtain the Inginer licentiat degree, after following a four-year program. In this case the Inginer Master degree is obtained after an additional one- or two-year graduate program.

=== Russia ===
As of 2012 in Russia, following degrees correspond to the "engineer's degree" in the sense of this article:

- Бакалавр по направлению - "bachelor at area" (where area's name is mentioned), currently awarded after four years of study and "area" is an engineering area, corresponding to one or more of former "specialties"
- Инженер - "engineer", which was formerly awarded after four, five, six years of study, may also contain clarification on the nature of engineering field, such as "mining engineer" or "systems engineer".
- Инженер по специальности - "engineer at specialty" (where specialty's name is mentioned), currently awarded after five or six years of study, may also contain clarification on the nature of engineering field, such as "engineer-ecologist at specialty Rational usage of natural resources and protection of the environment"
- Инженер-исследователь по специальности - "engineer-researcher at specialty" (where specialty's name is mentioned), was formerly awarded after seven years of study
- Магистр по направлению - "magister (master) at area" (where area's name is mentioned), currently awarded after two years of study to those already having any higher-education degree and "area" is an engineering area, corresponding to one or more of former "specialties"

Anything but "bachelor" is considered "second-level" higher education and gives access to postgraduate education for "candidate of sciences" degree, "bachelor" is considered "first-level" higher education degree and gives access to study for master's (magister) degree.

Post-graduate scientific degrees in engineering areas include кандидат технических наук - "candidate of technical sciences" and доктор технических наук - "doctor of technical sciences". Sometimes in English translations "...of technical sciences" is exchanged for "...of engineering".

=== Spain ===
The situation in Spain is very similar to France but without the grandes écoles and Germany-UK in relation to the Technical Engineering Degrees. Long cycle Engineer's degrees (Ingenieros) traditionally used to be (at least nominally) six-year programs but the tendency since the mid-1990s has been to reduce them to five years. The last step to get the degree is the Proyecto de Fin de Carrera (Degree Project), which involves a combination of application development and some research work. Students submit a dissertation that they have to defend. The Spanish official name for the degree is Ingeniero (Engineer) or other degree called Ingeniero Técnico (Technical Engineer), which is a three to four years degree (involving also a Final Degree Project) and is equivalent to a Bachelor of Engineering, the Technical Engineer in Spain has full competencies and legal authority in their field; however, certain engineering professions require by law a master's degree in their respective field, a degree called "master habilitante" or "habilitating master's degree". A distinctive characteristic of Spanish engineering degrees is that the average duration of studies up to graduation is about 40 percent above the nominal duration and that the drop-out rate is considerable due to stricter examination standards.

=== United Kingdom ===
Durham University established the first school of engineering in the UK in 1837, which awarded the academic rank of Civil Engineer between 1840 and 1852. After the school was re-established in Newcastle, the title of Civil Engineer was again awarded between 1887 and 1894. The supplemental charter of Queen's College, Birmingham in 1852 also specified that it could award the academic rank of Civil Engineer. The Birmingham school of engineering was wound down when the institution was reconstituted in 1867.

== Africa ==
Most countries follow the French system of higher education, the engineer's degree was called the Diplôme d'ingénieur.

Similar to France, an important part of engineering is taught in écoles d'ingénieurs, which are part of the grandes écoles system. Since the Bologna Process, the Diplôme d'ingénieur is officially considered to be at the level of a master's degree, equivalent to an integrated bachelor's and master's degree.

=== Morocco, Tunisia and Algeria ===
In Morocco, Tunisia, and Algeria, the main way to become an engineer is to have a Diplôme d'Ingénieur, delivered by the grandes écoles (or some technical universities), or have a master's degree in engineering from a University.

The Diplôme d'Ingénieur is a postgraduate degree in engineering usually awarded by the grandes écoles in engineering. It is generally obtained after five to seven years of studies after the baccalauréat. It is considered more prestigious by recruiters than a master's degree due to the difficulty of the program.

Each holder of the Diplôme d'Ingénieur is conferred the title of ingénieur diplômé (graduate engineer). This is distinguished from the term ingénieur (engineer) which is less regulated. The diplôme d'ingénieur is recognized as equivalent to a combined Bachelor of Science and Master of Science in engineering in the United States and in the countries of the European Union (also in France).

Most grandes écoles allow their students to join a double degree with a university (in France or abroad). Furthermore, Diplôme d'Ingénieur graduates can pursue a selective PhD after their engineering studies and later join academia or an industrial research and development department.

In Morocco, Tunisia, and Algeria, any institution issuing the Diplôme d'Ingénieur must be accredited by the state. The best institutions are usually part of the Conférence des Grandes écoles.

=== Egypt and South Africa ===
Egypt and South Africa do not follow the French education system and offer the traditional bachelor's and master's programs, which can be taken separately. The Diplôme d'Ingénieur is not offered.

== Asia ==
=== Indonesia ===
Prior to 2014, Indonesia used the Dutch degree classification inherited from colonial administration. The term "engineer" (Indonesian: insinyur from Dutch: ingenieur) was used as an academic title, for a bachelor degree in engineering who graduated from a university in the fields of agriculture, forestry, fisheries, and sometimes used in the field of applied science. However, after the academic title of Bachelor of Engineering (Sarjana Teknik) (S.T.) was conformed, the title of Engineer (Ir.) was no longer used by universities as an academic title but as a professional title stipulated in the Regulation of the Ministry of Education and Culture Number 154 of 2014 concerning Graduate Degree in Science and Technology.

The status of Engineer (Ir.) was thus raised to a professional title similar to the professional titles of Medical Doctor (dr.), Dentist (drg.), Midwife (Bd.), Nurse (Ns.), Pharmacist (Apt.), Accountant (Akt.), and Psychologist (Psi.). In other words, currently not all university graduates who hold an S.T. degree immediately have the right to be called engineers.

Names are traditionally prefixed with the ir. or ing. titles or suffixed with the S.T. degree. Use of these titles is regulated and protected by Indonesian law.

=== Vietnam ===
The Engineer's Degree in Vietnam is awarded to students who complete a specialized engineering program at the university level. The duration of these programs can vary depending on the specific program and institution. The Ministry of Education and Training (MOET) of Vietnam governs the naming and recognition of degrees. Although Vietnam is moving towards alignment with international standards, there might be some variations in nomenclature. The actual degree certificate may state "The Degree of Engineer" followed by the specific field of study. As of December 30, 2019, the Vietnamese National Qualifications Framework places the Engineer's degree, Doctoral degree, and Architecture degree at Level 7, making them equivalent to a Master's degree within this framework. However, this does not necessarily mean that the Engineer's degree is recognized as equivalent to a Master's degree in all other countries.

== See also ==
- Institute of technology
- Master of Engineering
