= Hiab Corporation =

Finnish industrial machinery company

- Native name: Hiab Oyj
- Formerly: Cargotec Corporation
- Type: Julkinen osakeyhtiö
- Traded as: Nasdaq Helsinki: HIAB
- Industry: Industrial machinery
- Predecessor: Cargotec
- Founded: June 2005; 21 years ago
- Headquarters: Helsinki, Finland
- Area served: Worldwide
- Key people: Jukka Moisio (Chairman); Scott Phillips (President and CEO); Mikko Puolakka (CFO)
- Products: Hiab: loader cranes, forestry and recycling cranes, demountables, truck-mounted forklifts and tail lifts Formerly: Kalmar: automation and integration solutions for terminals, straddle and shuttle carriers, reachstackers, empty container handlers, terminal tractors and forklift trucks, spreaders and bulk handling systems MacGregor: hatch covers, lashing systems, cargo handling cranes, RoRo equipment, winches and offshore load handling systems
- Revenue: ▼€1,556 million (2025)
- Operating income: ▼€213 million (2025)
- Net income: ▼€164 million (2025)
- Total assets: ▼€1,628.2 million (2025)
- Total equity: ▼€1,010.0 million (2025)
- Owner: Herlin family (ca. 69% of votes)
- Number of employees: 4,053 (December 2025)
- Website: www.hiabgroup.com

Hiab Corporation (natively Hiab Oyj; formerly Cargotec Corporation, natively Cargotec Oyj) is a Finnish industrial machinery company. It provides on-road load-handling solutions for various customer groups, which the company refers to as essential industries.

Hiab's offering consists of loader cranes (Hiab, Effer, Argos and Ing brands), truck-mounted forklifts (Moffett and Princeton), Loglift forestry cranes, Jonsered recycling cranes, Multilift demountables and hooklifts, Galfab roll-off cable hoists and tail lifts (Zepro, Del and Waltco brands). Hiab's service brand is Hi-Perform.

== From Cargotec to Hiab ==
Previously as Cargotec, the company consisted of three business areas Kalmar, Hiab and MacGregor. At that time the company produced cargo and load handling equipment and services to ships, ports, terminals and local distribution. From 2023 to 2025, the former Cargotec underwent a major transformation and a partial demerger:

- The Kalmar business was separated into a new listed company, Kalmar Corporation, with the demerger registered on 30 June 2024.
- The MacGregor business was sold, with the sale closed on 31 July 2025.
- With Hiab being the only remaining Cargotec's business area, Cargotec's Annual General Meeting approved the company name change from Cargotec Corporation to Hiab Corporation (Hiab Oyj in Finnish) on 26 March 2025.
- Hiab entered Nasdaq Helsinki on 1 April 2025.

== Recent activities ==
In November 2025, Hiab announced that it had signed an agreement to acquire the Brazilian crane manufacturer ING Cranes for an undisclosed amount. The acquisition was completed in January 2026. In January 2026, Hiab announced that it plans changes to its operating model, drives cost reductions and changes its leadership team.

== History ==
=== Cargotec Corporation (2005–2025) ===
Cargotec was formed in June 2005 when Kone Corporation was split into two companies to be listed: Cargotec and new Kone. After the split, Kone Corporation's marine cargo handling (MacGregor), container handling (Kalmar Industries AB) and load handling (HIAB and Moffett, the latter being based in Ireland and acquired in 2000) business units formed Cargotec. However, the businesses within Cargotec have much longer histories and they have been formed through a series of mergers and acquisitions during several decades.

Cargotec's Kalmar business area started to take shape in 1997 when Partek Corporation acquired the Finnish state-owned Sisu Ltd including its terminal tractor business. During the same year, Partek acquired a major shareholding in Kalmar Industries Ltd, a container handling equipment producer.

The foundations of Cargotec's Hiab business area were laid in 1977 when Partek Corporation bought Multilift Group. In 1985, Partek acquired Hydrauliska Industrier Ltd (HIAB) and Jonsered forestry cranes. A couple of years later Partek strengthened its forestry crane expertise by acquiring that particular business line from Fiskars. Several business acquisitions in 2000 enforced the load handling business. In 2004, the name HIAB was taken into use for the whole load handling business in Cargotec.

MacGregor originates from England where it started to serve shipping companies and shipyards in 1937. The marine cargo business of the company in a broader meaning started in 1983 when MacGregor merged with the Finnish Navire. In 1993, Incentive acquired MacGregor-Navire and merged it with Hägglunds Marine. In 1998, the majority of MacGregor was sold to Industri Kapital. In 2005, Cargotec bought MacGregor International AB, the global marine cargo flow solutions provider, to strengthen the company's cargo handling offering. Several mergers and acquisitions have taken place since to further strengthen MacGregor.

Around 2010, Cargotec prepared a separation and possible listing of MacGregor in Singapore. Due to market conditions and focusing on integration of major acquisitions, Cargotec's Board of Directors decided in October 2013 to delay the listing. On 1 October 2020, Cargotec and Konecranes announced that they have agreed to a merger. The deal will require two thirds of the shareholders and is expected to complete in the fourth quarter of 2021. The merger was cancelled in March 2022 after the UK Competition & Markets Authority blocked the merger between the companies.

==== Demerger of Cargotec ====
In April 2023, Cargotec announced that the company Board of Directors had decided to investigate and start a process to potentially separate the businesses areas Kalmar and Hiab into two standalone companies. In February 2024, Cargotec published a release stating that the company Board of Directors had approved a demerger plan concerning the separation of Kalmar into a new listed company. The demerger is subject to approval by the Annual General Meeting (AGM) of Cargotec, held on 30 May 2024. On 30 May 2024, Cargotec's Annual General Meeting resolved on the partial demerger of Cargotec Corporation in accordance with the demerger plan. On 30 June 2024, the completion of the partial demerger of Cargotec Corporation was registered in the Finnish Trade Register. On 14 November 2024, Cargotec announced that it will sell its MacGregor business to funds managed by Triton for an enterprise value of EUR 480 million.

On 26 March 2025, Cargotc's Annual General Meeting approved that the company Articles of Association is amended so that the company's new name is Hiab Oyj (in Finnish) and Hiab Corporation (in English). The change of the parent company name from Cargotec Corporation to Hiab Corporation was registered with the Finnish Trade Register on 31 March 2025. Hiab entered Nasdaq Helsinki on 1 April 2025. The completion of the divestment of former Cargotec's third business area MacGregor was announced on 31 July 2025.

== Ownership ==
At the end of 2025, Hiab's largest shareholders were Wipunen varainhallinta oy (23.67 percent of total votes), Mariatorp Oy (22.87% of votes) and Pivosto Oy (22.21% of votes). Wipunen varainhallinta Oy is controlled by Ilkka Herlin, Mariatorp Oy by Heikki Herlin and Pivosto Oy by Ilona Herlin.
