= Ata Gears =

Finnish transmission part producer

Ata Gears Oy
- Formerly: Oy Autotarvike Ab; Ata Osakeyhtiö - Aktiebolaget Ata (1946–1995)
- Type: osakeyhtiö
- Founded: Tampere, Finland (28 December 1937)
- Founder: Erik Duncker; Jaakko Mäkinen
- Headquarters: Tampere, Finland
- Key people: Hanna Miettinen (CEO)
- Products: gears, bearings and other transmission components
- Revenue: ▲€41,298,000 (2023); €33,684,000 (2022)
- Operating income: ▲€4,942,000 (2023); €1,290,000 (2022)
- Number of employees: ▲146 (2023); 137 (2022)
- Website: atagears.fi/en/

Ata Gears Oy is a Finnish producer of spiral bevel gears founded in 1937. The headquarter is in Tampere. The company produces transmission parts for marine and industrial applications.

== Products ==
Ata produces gears up to 3000 mm of outer diameter. The annual production is 8000 spiral bevel gear sets of which 65% are exported.

== History ==
Ata was founded in December 1937 under name Oy Autotarvike Ab ("Auto Accessory Ltd."). The founders were Erik Duncker and Jaakko Mäkinen. In the 1940s the company supplied Finnish vehicle producers and specialised on gears of driven axles; the first bevel gears were produced in 1940. Exports started in 1942. Ata was one of the founders of the 1943 started heavy vehicle producer Yhteissisu becoming shareholder together with other Finnish companies and the state.

In the 1950s Ata started producing gears for domestically produced tractors and trams; pulp and paper industry applications came to selection in the 1960s. Marine industry grew a significant market segment in the 1970s. In the late 1980s Ata went to motor sports delivering spiral bevel gears for rally and Formula One, as well as American CART teams.

In the 21st century Ata started producing gears for mining equipment producers. New factories in Tampere were opened in 2004 and 2009.
