= Diplomi-insinööri =

Diplomi-insinööri (DI) (Swedish: diplomingenjör) is a Finnish Master's level academic degree with a nominal length of 300 ECTS credits. The official English translation of the degree is Master of Science (Technology). The Finnish name derives from the old German degree called Diplom-Ingenieur.

== Status ==
The degree qualifies for the tekniikan lisensiaatti (Licenciate of Science (Technology)) and the tekniikan tohtori (Doctor of Science (Technology)) degrees. It is preceded directly by tekniikan kandidaatti (Bachelor of Science in technology), and with some additional study, by other Bachelor's level degrees. It is a taught master's degree, but includes a half-year project (diplomityö, Master's thesis).

The diplomi-insinööri degree is granted by nine Finnish universities in a variety of degree programs. The common feature of the programs is the engineering approach based on scientific and mathematical studies. Usually, graduates with the degree work as experts, managers, researchers, or entrepreneurs. Many, if not most, of the middle and upper management in Finnish engineering and technology-based corporations, are DIs.

Since 2005, the degree has been incorporated into the Bologna Process, and all students admitted before 2005 were required to complete their studies by 2010 if they wished to graduate under the old statutes. The modern, Bologna-compatible degree includes an intermediate bachelor's degree tekniikan kandidaatti, which is to be taken after three years of studies (180 ECTS). In the old system, an intermediate degree did not exist, which was a problem for exchange students going to study abroad in Masters-level studies.

In Finland, higher education follows a dual model with science-and-letters-based universities and work-oriented polytechnics. In polytechnics, students may study for the degree insinööri (AMK), officially translated Bachelor of Engineering, which is a four-year, 240 ECTS program. The holders of insinööri (AMK) qualify to study straight for the diplomi-insinööri degree without the tekniikan kandidaatti degree in the same branch of technology, but must usually complete up to 60 ECTS worth of mathematical and scientific studies in addition to the normal master's degree requirement. Thus the master's program for insinööris (AMK) has a length of 180 ECTS or three years. Similar requirements apply, if a Bachelor with a university degree from a non-engineering program is admitted.

In both the new and the old system, the degrees are classified into "pass" and "with distinction" (oivallisesti) categories. The rare "with distinction" classification (less than 10% of the graduates) requires a grade point average of at least 4.00/5 and a thesis with a grade of at least 4/5.

== Universities ==
Universities that grant the degree are:

- Aalto University (previously Helsinki University of Technology)
- University of Eastern Finland
- Tampere University (previously Tampere University of Technology)
- University of Jyväskylä
- Lappeenranta University of Technology
- University of Oulu
- University of Turku
- University of Vaasa
- Åbo Akademi

The universities have a common entrance examination and selection process, DIA-valinta (diplomi-insinööri- ja arkkitehtikoulutuksen yhteisvalinta), which accounts for most of matriculations.
