= Terminal tractor =

Truck that moves semi trailers within a cargo yard

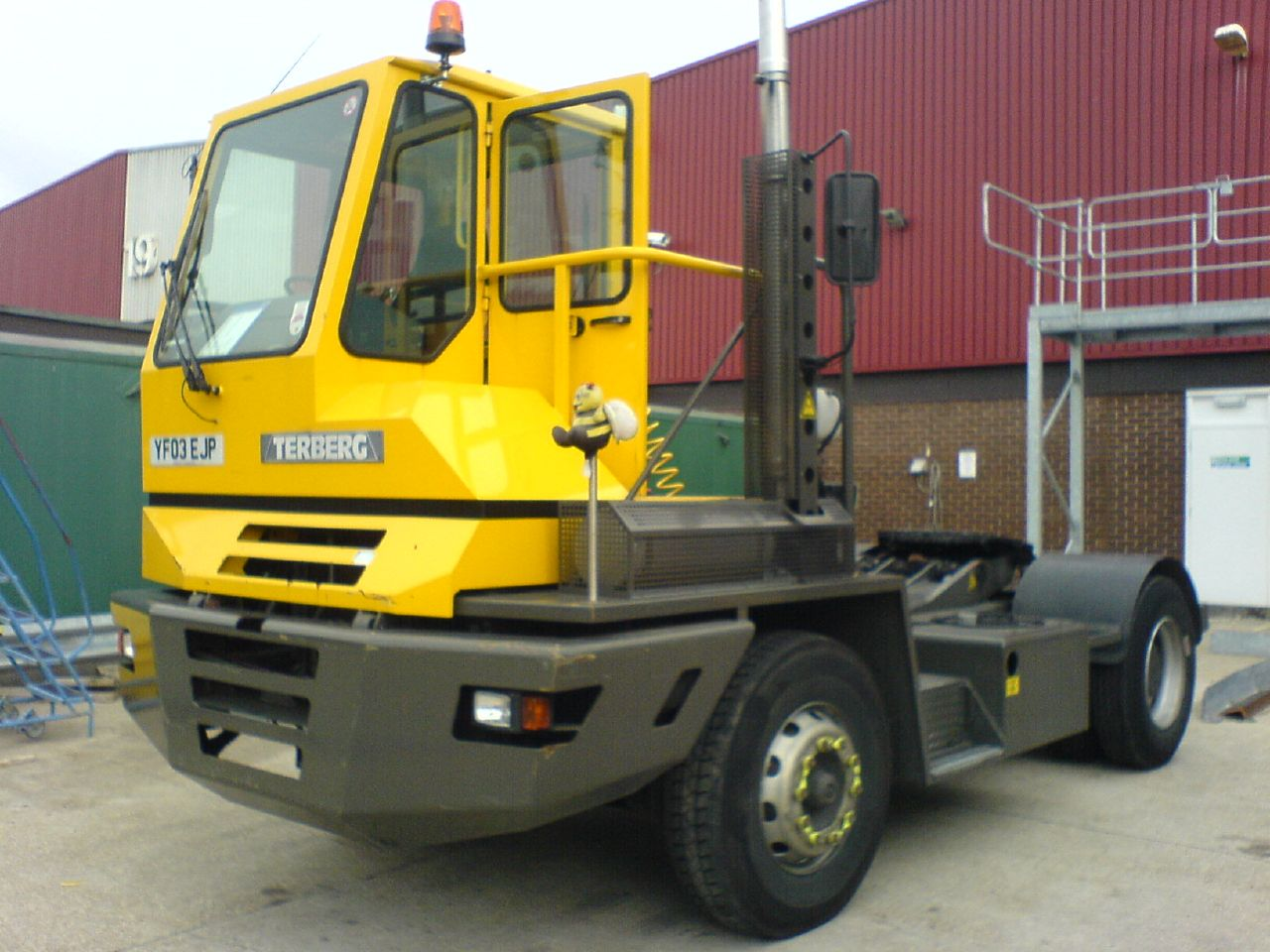
A terminal tractor

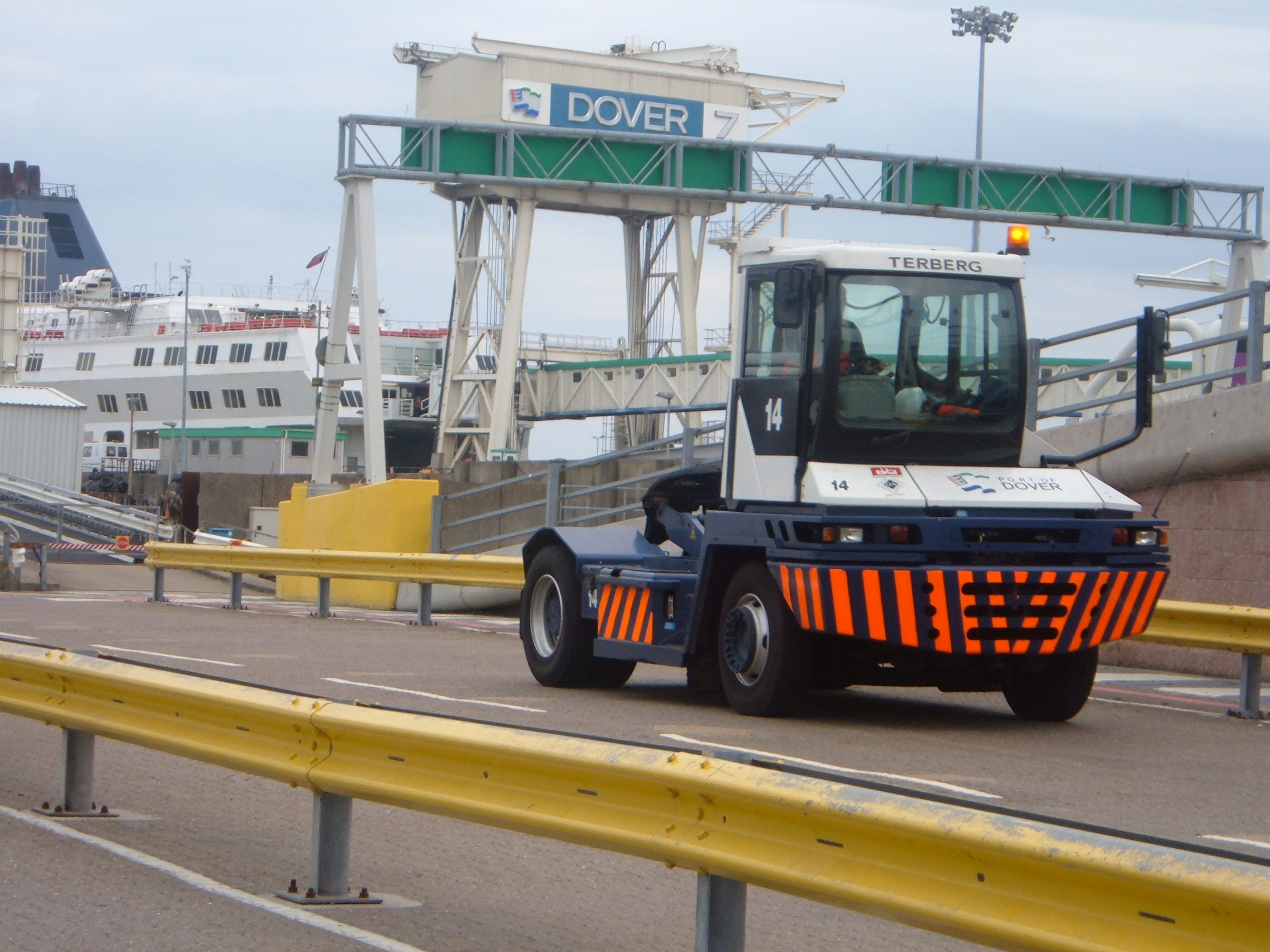
Terminal tractor at the Port of Dover.

A terminal tractor, known in the United States as a shag truck, shunt truck, spotter truck, spotting tractor, yard truck, yard shifter, yard dog, yard goat, yard horse, yard mule, yard hostler, yard spotter, hostler, or mule, is a kind of semi-tractor intended to move semi-trailers within a cargo yard, warehouse facility, or intermodal facility, much like a switcher locomotive is used to position railcars. In the United Kingdom they are known as terminal lorries or terminal trucks. In the United States the term is most often called a yard driver or switcher, often given the nickname yard dog, affectionately not derogatively. Yard dogs are generally thought well of by other drivers because they will often back trailers into docks that are narrow or difficult to pull off by large OTR tractors with sleeper beds.

Some manufacturers include Terberg from The Netherlands and Kalmar Ottawa from the U.S.

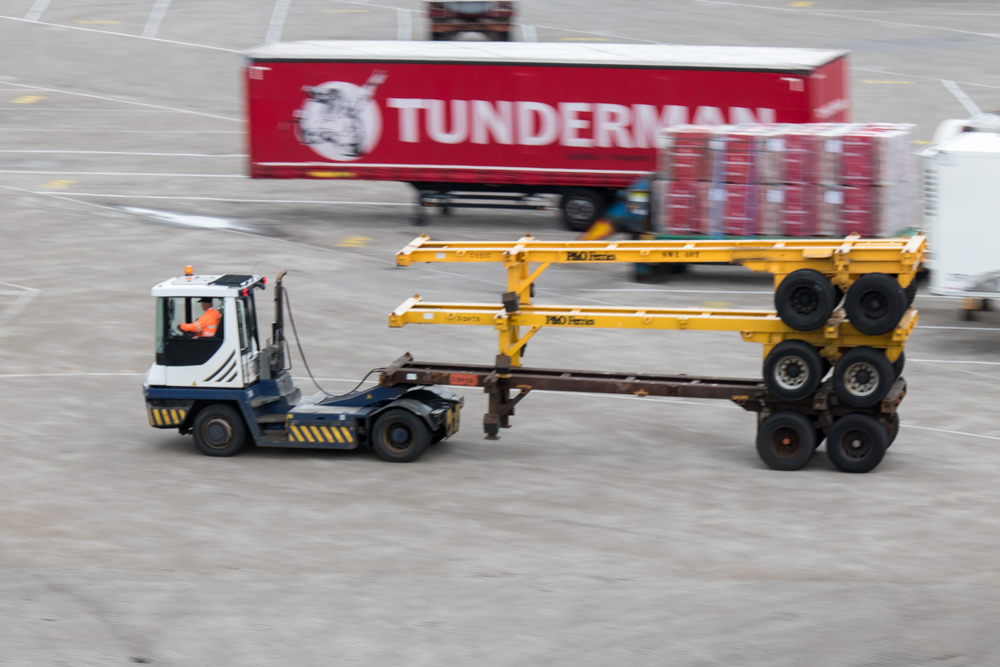
A terminal tractor moving trailers in the Port of Rotterdam, the Netherlands

== Characteristics ==
Distinctions between a terminal tractor and a regular tractor unit include:

- A single-person cab offset to the side of the engine.
- A full-height, sliding rear door for easy access to trailer connections.
- A very short wheelbase, usually with a solidly mounted rear axle.
- A low-power diesel, alternative fuel engine, or electric motor usually with an automatic transmission.
- A fifth-wheel coupling with an integrated lifting mechanism allows the semi-trailer's legs to remain in the lowered position during movement. 380 millimetres (15 in) and 32,000 kg (71,000 lb) of hydraulic lift is typical.
- A rear window to create a 360-degree view

Since off-road versions do not have to drive on roads at highway speeds, a typical top speed is 40 kilometres per hour (25 mph).

== Electric terminal trucks ==
The global EV push has given rise to a large number of all-electric terminal truck manufacturers around the world. These trucks – used in both on-road and off-road fleet – claim to be zero-emission trucks. Some of the notable manufacturers include Royal Terberg Group, Renault, Volvo, MAN, Orange EV, Motiv, Autocar, Kalmar, Mol Cy and Tevva. Orange EV is one of the largest suppliers of zero-emission terminal trucks in the United States.

== See also ==
- Aircraft tug
- Cab over
- Gladhand connector
- Sisu Terminal Systems
- Mafi Roll trailer
