= Crocs =

American shoe manufacturing company

Crocs, Inc.

- Type: Public
- Traded as: Nasdaq: CROX; S&P 400 component
- Industry: Wholesale trade; Retail & consumer services; Clothing & clothing accessories
- Founded: 2002; 24 years ago
- Founder: Scott Seamans, Lyndon Hanson and George Boedecker Jr
- Headquarters: Broomfield, Colorado, U.S.
- Key people: Andrew Rees (CEO, 2017–present); Anne Mehlman (president, 2024–present); Steven Smith (Head of Creative Innovation, 2025–present)
- Products: Shoes
- Revenue: ▲US$4.102 billion (2024)
- Net income: ▲US$950 million (2024)
- Total assets: ▲US$4.81 billion (2024)
- Total equity: ▲US$1.84 billion (2024)
- Number of employees: 7,910, including 4,560 in retail-related functions (2024)
- Website: crocs.com

Crocs, Inc. is an American footwear company based in Broomfield, Colorado, which manufactures and markets the Crocs brand of foam footwear. Crocs, Inc. terms these "clogs", but they do not contain wood like traditional clogs. In 2021, they acquired the Italian footwear brand HEYDUDE for $2.5 billion. In 2025, Crocs revenue stood at $3.3 billion, an increase of 1.5% from the previous year.

== History ==
=== 2002–2007 ===
Scott Seamans, Lyndon Hanson and George Boedecker Jr. created Crocs in 2002 to make and distribute the sandals, as they saw its potential and ease of use for consumers.

The trio acquired Andrew Reddyhoff's design from Foam Creations, Inc. of Quebec City, which became the foundation of the Crocs sandals known in the present day. Seamans, Hanson, and Boedecker were drawn to the shoe's comfort and practicality.

In 2002, Crocs unveiled their first model, the Beach, at the Fort Lauderdale Boat Show in Florida, and all 200 pairs produced sold out.

As the demand for Crocs grew, the company underwent further development and rebranding. In 2005, TDA Boulder redesigned the original Crocs logo and launched the "Ugly Can Be Beautiful" campaign, the first national advertising campaign for the Crocs brand. This successful campaign, created by Creative Director Thomas Dooley, Designer Matt Ebbing, and Creative Director Jonathan Schoenberg, helped pave the way for Crocs' successful IPO.

On February 8, 2006, Crocs completed its IPO and opened on the Nasdaq at a price of $21.00 per share, raising $208 million.

=== 2008–2015 ===
On April 14, 2008, during the 2008 financial crisis, the stock dropped 30% in after-hours trading after the company issued a press release in which they significantly decreased earnings estimates for the first quarter. In the same statement, the company announced layoffs of its 600 Quebec City factory employees as retailers had been reducing orders, though about 100 sales and marketing positions would remain. "The retail environment in the U.S. has become increasingly challenging as consumer spending and traffic levels have slowed," chief executive officer Ron Snyder said. During the 2008 financial crisis, CROX dropped to as low as $0.79 before rebounding ($15.50 by November 2010).

On July 21, 2010, Crocs, Inc. announced a restructuring plan to streamline its operations and workforce by eliminating 180 jobs, closing 75 to 100 stores (out of 624 worldwide), and scrapping underperforming product lines. Crocs has previously eliminated 183 positions, including 70 current and planned positions in its corporate headquarters in Niwot, Colorado. Crocs also announced they would open a "global commercial center" with 50 to 75 employees in Boston, Massachusetts, in 2014, for merchandising, marketing, and retail functions.

On October 18, 2011, Crocs stock suffered a single-day drop of about 39.4% on lowered earnings and revenues forecast.

In June 2013, Crocs reported a 42.5% decrease in net profits from the year before. As a result, the stock fell 20.2% in one day.

In December 2013, the hedge fund S.A.C. Capital Advisors disclosed that it held a 5% stake in Crocs, just over a day after The Blackstone Group said it would invest $200 million in a convertible preferred stock offering that would allow the company to replace its CEO and buy back $350 million in stock. In a filing with the U.S. Securities and Exchange Commission, SAC Capital management said it had accumulated a 5% passive stake in Crocs.

=== 2016–present ===
Crocs had sold 300 million pairs of shoes by year 2017. In August 2018, Crocs announced it was closing its last company-operated manufacturing plants in Mexico and Italy. In June 2020, Crocs moved the headquarters from Niwot, Colorado, to Broomfield.

In 2020, in response to the COVID-19 pandemic, the company launched "A Free Pair for Healthcare" offering healthcare workers a free pair of their shoes. Crocs also sent 100,000 pairs of shoes to hospitals to be distributed to staff.

In the years 2020 to 2022, Crocs experienced a surge in sales due to several factors. One reason for the brand's resurgence was a shift in consumer behavior during the COVID-19 pandemic, with many people looking for footwear that they could wear while working from home. Additionally, Crocs benefited from collaborations with high-profile fashion designers and a marketing campaign that helped to revitalize the brand's image. As a result of these factors, Crocs' sales had a two-digit rise annually during this period.

In December 2025, Crocs filed a lawsuit against US Customs and Border Protection, the Department of the Treasury, the Department of Homeland Security, and the Office of the US Trade Representative, seeking $54 million in refunds for tariffs imposed by the second Trump administration that the company was required to pay.

== Business and operations ==
=== Acquisitions ===
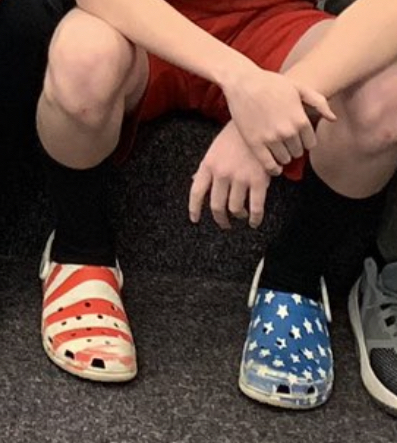
An American pair of stylized Crocs, symbolizing the flag of the United States

In October 2006, Crocs, Inc. purchased Jibbitz, a manufacturer of accessories that snap into the holes in Croc's shoes, for $10 million, or $20 million if Jibbitz met earnings goals.

In January 2007, Crocs acquired assets of Ocean Minded for $1.75 million in cash, plus potentially $3.75 million based on performance. Ocean Minded makes leather and ethylene-vinyl acetate-based footwear. In July 2007 Crocs agreed to buy shoe- and sandal-maker Bite Footwear, based in Redmond, Washington, for $1.75 million, or up to double that based on earnings results.

In April 2008, Crocs acquired Tidal Trade, Inc. ("Tidal Trade"), the company's third-party distributor in South Africa, for $4.6 million. The company recorded $1.4 million in customer relationships on the date of acquisition. Crocs repurchased inventory previously sold to Tidal Trade and accordingly recognized a reduction of revenue of approximately $2.1 million. Also in April the company acquired Tagger International B.V. ("Tagger"), a private limited liability company incorporated under Dutch law that manufactures messenger bags. Tagger was partially owned by the Managing Director of Crocs Europe B.V. The company acquired all Tagger assets for $2 million;– $90,000 for inventory and $1.9 million for the Tagger trademark. Later in June, Crocs liquidated Fury, Inc. two years after acquiring it, after efforts to sell it off were unsuccessful. As a result, Crocs wrote off $250,000 related to the remaining customer relationships, intangible assets, and trademarks over three months.

In February 2022, Crocs acquired the Italian shoe company HEYDUDE for $2.3 billion, as well as issuance of stock to one owner of HEYDUDE.

Since the beginning of Russia's full-scale invasion of Ukraine, the company's operations in Russia, including retail, e-commerce sales and imports into the country, have been suspended with a promise of support through donations to UNICEF.

=== Manufacture and patents ===
In June 2004, Crocs purchased Foam Creations and their manufacturing operations to secure exclusive rights to the proprietary foam resin called Croslite. Croslite is a closed-cell resin, described by third parties as an injection-moulded EVA foam. The foam forms itself to a wearer's feet and offers purported medical benefits, according to several podiatrists. Crocs holds a patent applied for under the title "breathable workshoes and methods for manufacturing such", and three design patents covering various ornamental aspects.

As of 2007, the company had applied to register "Crocs" and the Crocs logo as trademarks in over 40 jurisdictions around the world, including the U.S.; many such applications were pending approval. Crocs also extended the scope of their trademark registrations and applications for both the Crocs mark and logo to cover non-footwear products, such as sunglasses, goggles, knee pads, watches, luggage, and some of their Internet sales activities.

=== Products ===
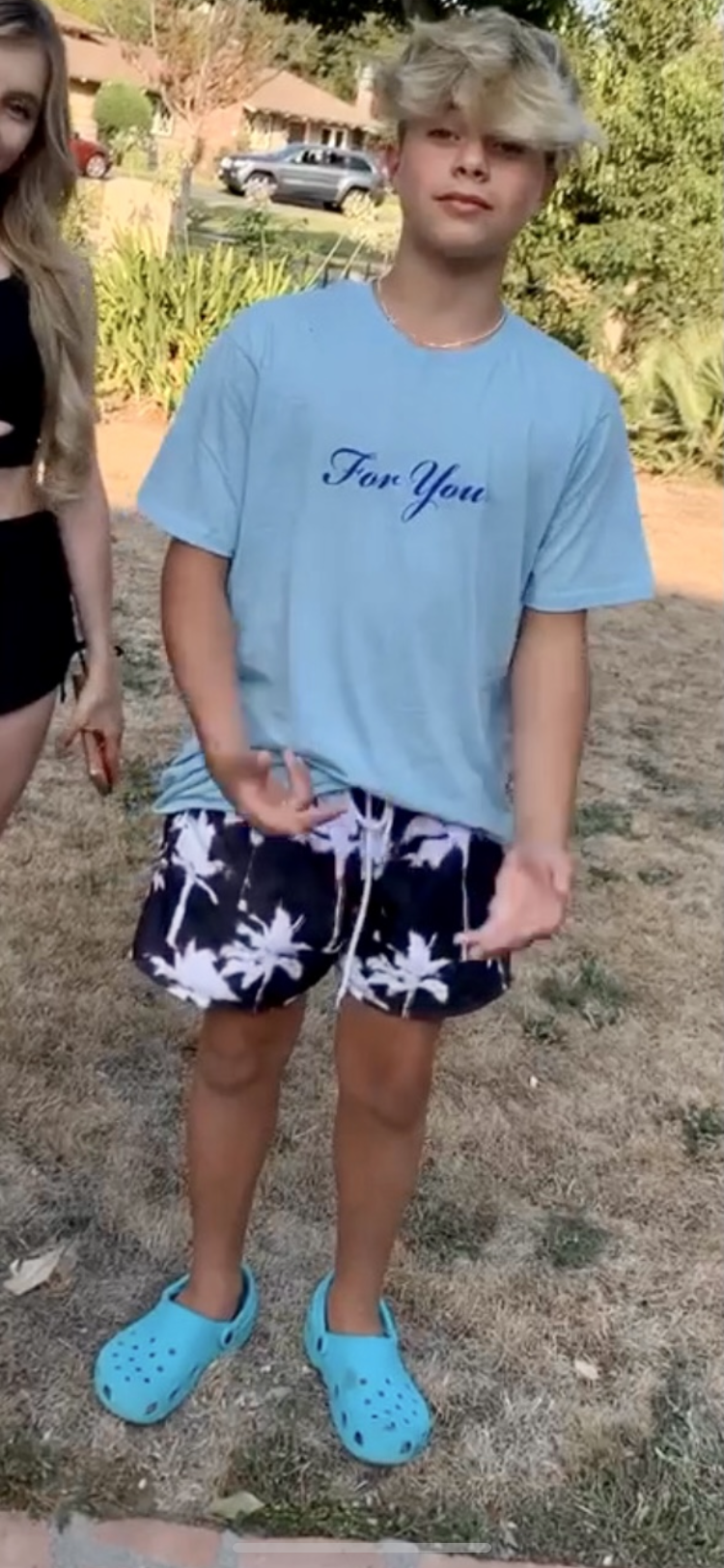
Gavin Magnus wearing a pair of blue Crocs

Crocs are made in a variety of styles and colors. The Classic styles are available in more than 30 colors. A "Fuzz Collection" with woolly liners extends the brand's range to winter wear.

Crocs also sells other fashion accessories. Jibbitz are decorations that can be clipped to the ventilation holes in the shoes.

In 2008, the company entered the golf shoe marketplace by acquiring the golf shoe manufacturer Bite Footwear and introducing a Croc-styled pair of golf shoes, the Ace.

After the acquisition of HeyDude for $2.5 billion in 2022, the shoemaker expanded into shoes other than their patent clogs, and they also started manufacturing apparel.

=== Partnerships and collaborations ===
Crocs was the title sponsor of the Association of Volleyball Professionals (AVP) Tour from 2006 through the 2009 season.

=== Imitations and counterfeits ===
Crocs announced in 2006 that it filed complaints with the United States International Trade Commission (ITC) and the United States district court against 11 companies that manufacture, import, or distribute products, called "croc-offs", that Crocs believes infringe its patents. Seizures of counterfeit Crocs occurred in 2007 in the Philippines and Denmark, and were under litigation in South Africa. In 2010, the United States Court of Appeals for the Federal Circuit held that Crocs' design patent had been infringed.

In 2007, the U.S. Consumer Product Safety Commission requested a voluntary recall of Crocs-like "clogs" due to a potential choking hazard involving detaching plastic rivets.

Versions of the Croc style shoes have appeared in children's fashion catalogs, usually under their name brands or as no names. Other knock-offs can be found in discount stores, amusement park stores, beach stores, department stores, and superstores.

== Health and safety ==
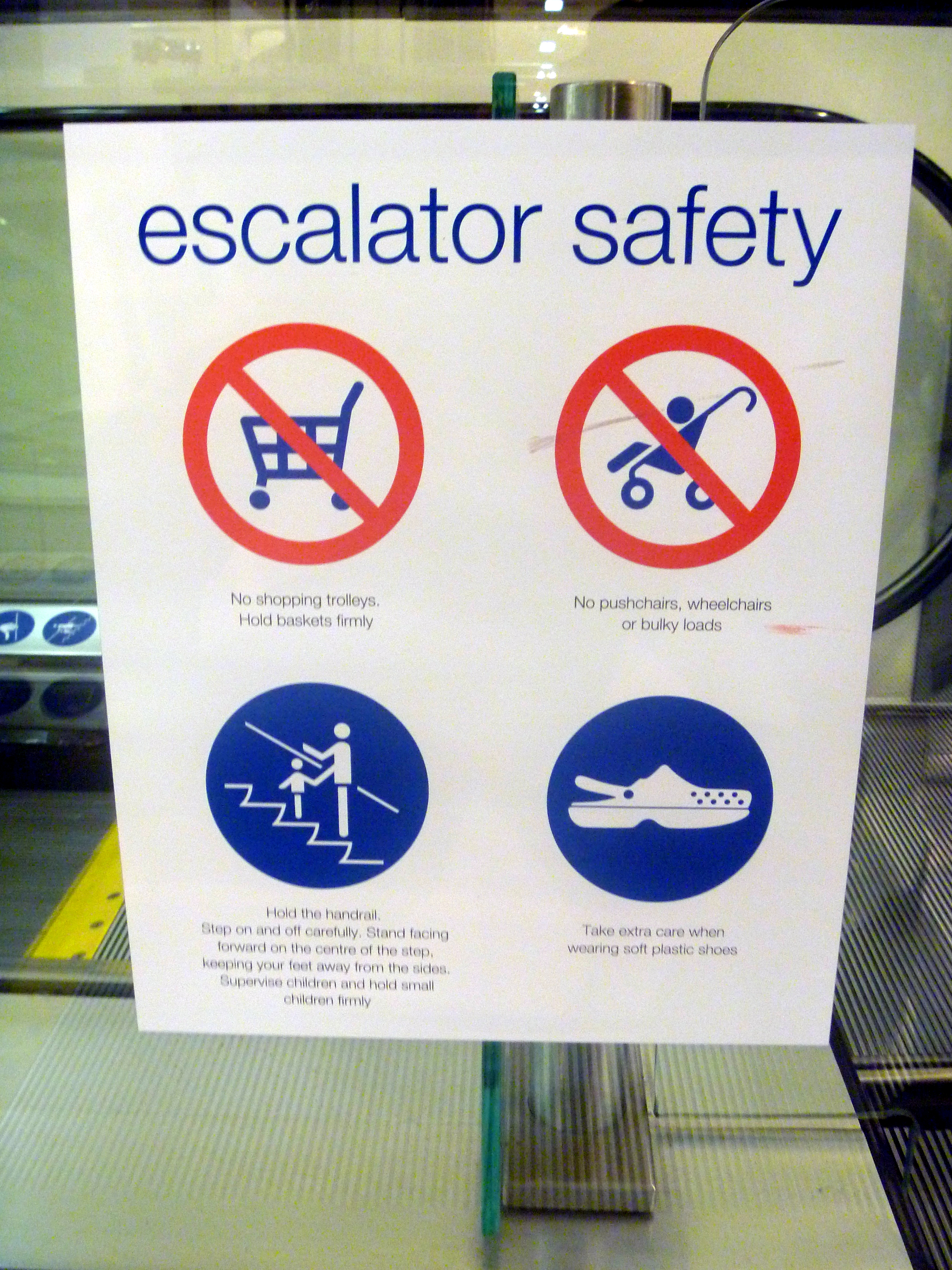
Moving stairs/escalator safety sign mentioning soft shoes (picture indicates Crocs)

Some Crocs shoes were tested and recommended by the U.S. Ergonomics company in 2005 and were accepted by the American Podiatric Medical Association in 2009. In 2008, the U.S. government Centers for Medicare & Medicaid Services approved a model of Crocs with molded insoles as diabetic footwear, to help reduce foot injuries.

Footwear such as Crocs and flip-flops came under scrutiny in 2006 in the U.S. and in 2008 in Japan when children suffered injuries after the shoes became caught in escalator mechanisms. This was due to the soft shoe material combined with the smaller size of children's feet. In 2008, Japan's Ministry of International Trade and Industry, after receiving 65 complaints of injuries, requested that Crocs change its design.

Internationally, some healthcare facilities introduced policies in 2007 regulating Crocs. Rapid City Regional Hospital in South Dakota changed its dress code to prohibit the sandal variants and those with holes, citing safety concerns, but allowed closed-top "Professional" and the healthcare-focused "Rx" Crocs to be worn. Over 100 hospitals in Canada were advised to implement similar policies. Blekinge and Karolinska University hospitals in Sweden banned the wearing of "Forsberg slippers" (Foppatofflor) by staff, due to high voltage static electricity buildup which was observed to interfere with electronic equipment. City hospitals in Vienna, Austria, announced banning Crocs, often worn by nursing staff, to comply with antistatic requirements.

Crocs announced the Fuse and two others in 2009, formulated to dissipate static electricity by European standard EN ISO 20347:2004 (E), for use in the medical sector.

== Cultural influence ==
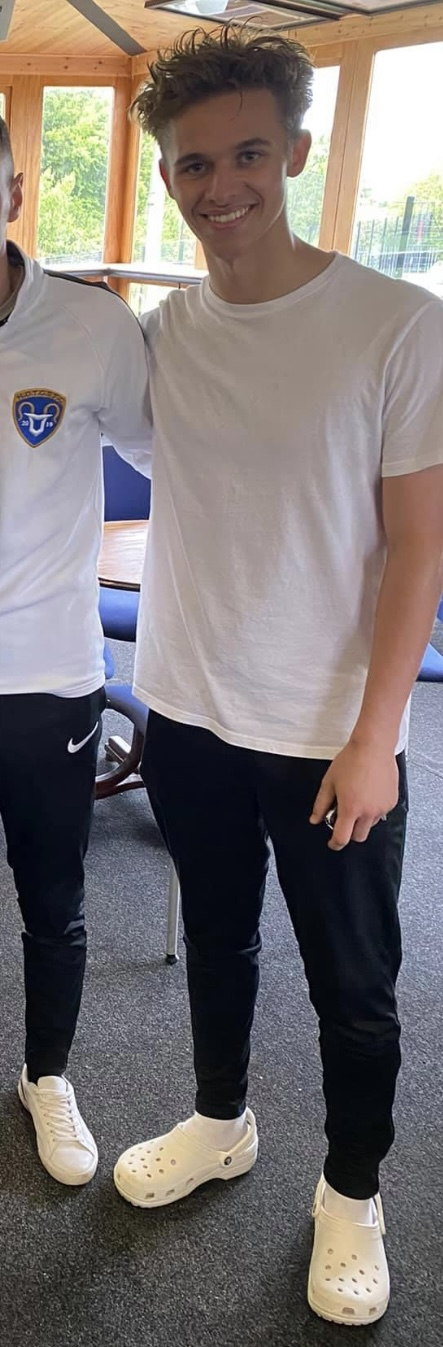
British actor Joe-Warren Plant wearing a pair of white Crocs

Sales of Crocs increased dramatically starting in 2009, with The New York Times stating that first-quarterly sales roughly tripled from 2006 to 2007. A 2006 article in The Washington Post described the phenomenon: "Nor is the fashion world enamored of Crocs. Though their maker touts their 'ultra-hip Italian styling,' lots of folks find them hideous." In 2007, then-U.S. president George W. Bush publicly wore black Crocs with socks. Comedian Bill Maher stated during a 2007 episode of his show Real Time that people should "stop wearing plastic shoes". A 2007 episode of The Daily Show featured comedian Rob Corddry as a reporter satirically following up on that year's lewd conduct arrest of Senator Larry Craig, with Corddry stating that a person wearing Crocs is signaling that "anything goes".

The 2006 film Idiocracy heavily features footwear as the costume department had a limited budget and Crocs were an inexpensive option. During the 2004 production of the film the team thought that the inexpensive plastic shoes both looked like they could be the shoe of the future but also too stupid to catch on, making them perfect for the film.

In 2008, fashion consultant Tim Gunn told Time, "[The Croc] looks like a plastic hoof. How can you take that seriously?" A 2008 anti-Crocs essay in Newsweek by ice hockey player Steve Tuttle generated much response from readers who both agreed and disagreed with it. In 2009, then-First Lady Michelle Obama was spotted wearing Crocs with her daughter. Crocs were ranked the sixth worst thing to happen to men in 2007 by Maxim. In 2010, Time magazine listed Crocs as one of the world's "50 Worst Inventions". The blog "IHateCrocs.com" was founded by two Canadian college students; one of its founders, Kate Leth, referred to the shoes as "hideous". The website "CrocFans.com" documented the uses of the shoes. The Facebook group "I Don't Care How Comfortable Crocs Are, You Look Like a Dumbass" has been mentioned in the media.

In the mid-2010s, public perception of Crocs began to shift. In 2015, Prince George was photographed at a charity event wearing navy blue Crocs. After one week, this created a 1,500% increase of sales according to a spokesperson for Amazon.com. Fashion designer Christopher Kane had his models wear Crocs during his show at the 2016 London Fashion Week, and Balenciaga released a 10 cm Croc platform shoe in 2017. Crocs saw a massive surge in popularity in 2020, caused by the rise of casual fashion during the early stages of the COVID-19 pandemic and its worldwide lockdowns. By 2022, they were the best-selling item of clothing on Amazon. Industry experts believed that much of the trend was also driven by Gen Z's desire for "comfort and unconventional style". Celebrities such as Justin Bieber, Bad Bunny, Ariana Grande, Post Malone, Nicki Minaj, Questlove, and Kanye West all sported Crocs during the early 2020s, inspiring fans to embrace the shoes' "newfound coolness". There have also been limited edition themed Crocs created in collaboration with Bieber, KFC, Hidden Valley Ranch, and Pixar.

In August 2026, the creative consultant Emily Keegin wrote in The New York Times that "Blinged-Up Crocs" are one of the 25 objects that "reveal something special about" America.. Her rendering of the place of Crocs in America highlighted both their low original reputation, their re-evaluation, and their function-over-form design, noting that "in the right light, even ugly can be cute."

== See also ==
- List of shoe styles
