= Pediatric podiatry =

Overview of podiatry in children

Children's feet are smaller than those of adults, not reaching full size until the ages of approximately 13 in girls and 15 in boys. There are correspondingly small sizes of shoes for them. In poor populations and developing countries, children commonly go barefoot.

== Development ==
The development of children's feet begins in-utero, being mainly derived from basic embryological tissue called mesenchyme. In simple terms, the mesenchyme differentiates to form a cartilage foot template, which is largely complete by the end of the embryonic period (8 weeks after conception). The lower limb buds appear around the 4th embryonic week, slightly later than the upper limb buds, and the developing nervous system is already evident. The blood supply of the foot then begins to infiltrate the tarsal bones, whilst the process of endochondral ossification sees cartilage become bone. Not all of the foot bones are formed at birth. The navicular is the last bone to ossify, occurring between 2 and 5 years of age. The ossification of the cuboid occurs reliably at 37 weeks gestation and its appearance is often used as a marker of foetal maturity. At birth of a 'full-term' baby the average foot length is 7.6 centimetres (range 7.1 – 8.7 cm). Foot growth continues to be very rapid in the first 5 years of life; slower development continues until skeletal maturity of the feet, which occurs on average at 13 years in girls and 15 years in boys. Final foot length is achieved before maximum height is reached in both genders.

In Imperial China, it was the custom for respectable women to have their feet bound as children. This was started between the ages of five and seven. The feet were bound tightly and forced into increasingly small shoes so that the front part of the foot was bent back and the toes touched the heel. This was done to make the girls marriageable as the tiny feet and the swaying lotus gait which resulted were considered attractive.

== Gait ==
Children's motor development generally follows the pattern of sitting (around 6 months), crawling (around 9 months) and walking (around 10–16 months), with high normal variability in the ages at which various milestones are reached. The early gait of young new-walking children is distinguished from that of an older child or adult by many features: shortened stride, feet held widely apart, arms held up ('high guard' assisting balance), apparent sway (coronal plane), and rapid steps (high cadence). More mature gait includes body rotations (transverse plane), longer stride, and lowered arm swing, all of which increase both speed and energy efficiency. Mature gait patterns generally develop around 3 years of age, but again there is a range of normal variation (2 to 6 years). Walking or bipedal gait is usually assessed clinically unless there is a neuromuscular condition, such as cerebral palsy. Laboratory based gait analysis can be very useful for planning treatment regimes, especially surgical management, but also the effects of ankle-foot-orthoses (AFO's) and footwear.

== Footwear ==
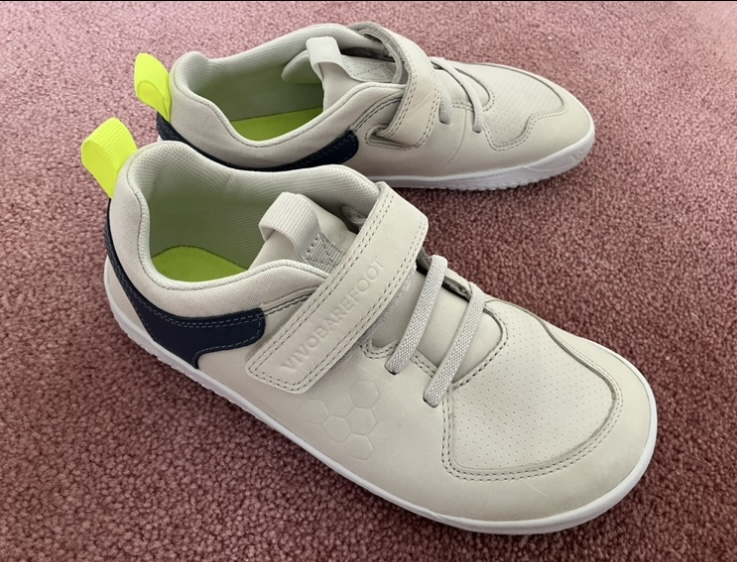
A pair of kids sneakers from Vivobarefoot.

A recent Cochrane Library systematic review includes 11 studies investigating the effects of children's footwear. Children wearing shoes were found to children walk faster by taking longer steps with greater ankle and knee motion and increased tibialis anterior activity. Shoes were also found to reduce foot motion and increase the support (weight-bearing) phases of the gait cycle. During running, shoes were found to reduce swing (non-weight-bearing) phase leg speed, attenuate some shock, and encourage a rearfoot strike pattern. The long-term effect of these gait changes due to footwear on growth and development are currently unknown. The impact of footwear on gait should be considered when assessing children's gait and evaluating the effect of shoe or in-shoe interventions.

Children who go barefoot have a lower incidence of flat feet and deformity while having greater foot flexibility than children who wear shoes.

== Medical problems ==
Children's feet are a frequent presentation to a range of health professionals and represent a common parental concern. Both particular paediatric conditions and foot development results in many changes and variations to foot appearance. It is important that foot problems are differentiated from growing trends, that foot pain is well diagnosed, and that any treatment is based upon best available evidence.

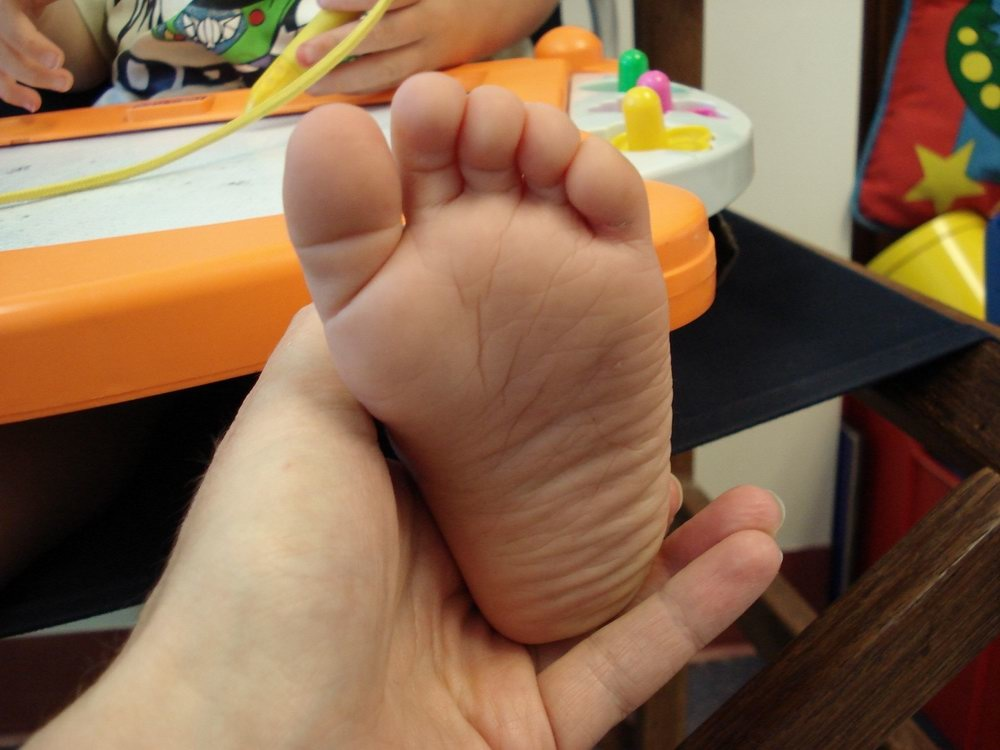
A child's foot, plantar view.

=== Congenital deformity ===
Congenital foot deformities may be readily identified, e.g. club foot (talipes equino varus). Currently the'gold-standard' treatment choice for club feet is the Ponseti method. Other treatment options include the French Functional method or a combination of the two methods and some treatment centers also use Botox treatments. Maintaining the correction is challenging as relapses occurs in up to 37% of the feet treated with the Ponseti method and 29% of feet treated with the French Functional method. Surgery are therefore used as a last resort option with recurring club feet presentation. The Ponseti method is used across the globe in both developed and developing countries (where many aid programs, such as "Walk for Life" train local health professionals). Congenital foot appearance may also be indicative of a genetic condition; a wider space between the first and second toes with associated skin creasing may be found with Down's syndrome (trisomy 21).

=== High arches ===
Pes cavus or high arched feet are an unusual finding in young children. Whilst some cavus foot types are familial and normally inherited, others are indicative of genetic neurological conditions, e.g. Charcot–Marie–Tooth disease or Friedrich's ataxia. The appearance of high arched feet in young children should be noted.

=== Flat feet ===
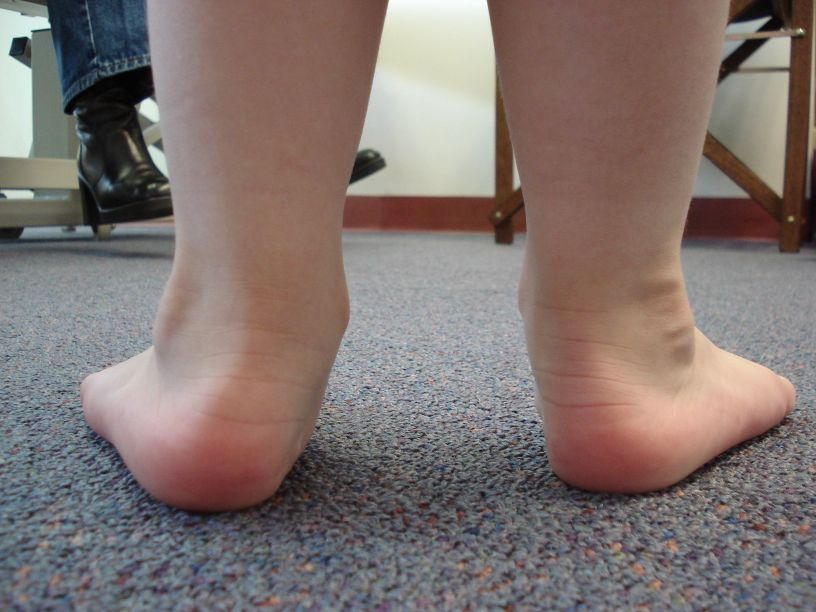
flat feet

Relative to the skeletally mature foot structure, it is expected that an infant and young child should display a flat foot posture with a lower medial longitudinal arch and everted heel position. Consistently across many studies, paediatric flat foot posture has been found to reduce with age. Normative data has been compiled from multiple studies using the Foot Posture Index (FPI-6) to show that children's feet become less flat with increasing age, that adult's feet are least flat, and that older people's feet become flatter. The normal findings of flat foot versus children's age estimate 45% of pre-school children, and 15% of older children (average age 10 years) have flat feet. Few flexible flat feet have been found to be symptomatic, hence only painful flat feet should be diagnosed and treated. Increased joint mobility or increased weight may increase flat foot prevalence, independently of age.

==== Treatment of children's flat feet ====
Contemporary management of the paediatric flat foot is directed according to pain, age, and flexibility, considering gender, weight, and joint hypermobility. When foot orthoses are indicated, inexpensive generic appliances will usually suffice. The paediatric flat foot proforma (p-FFP) directs this evidence-based approach. A Cochrane review of sixteen trials with 1058 children investigated the use of foot orthoses in children and could not make a recommendation, concluding that customized foot orthoses and further study on this subject should be reserved for children with foot pain and arthritis, for unusual morphology, or unresponsive cases. Surgery is rarely indicated for paediatric flat foot (unless rigid) and only at the failure of thorough conservative management.
