= Liner =

Liner or LINER may refer to:

== Line drawing ==
- Eye liner, a type of makeup
- Marker pen, a porous-tip pen with its own ink source
- Multiple lining tool used in engraving
- A sable brush used by coach painters

== Linings ==
- Acoustic liner, a noise-damping panel in an aircraft engine
- Album liner, a record sleeve or combination of sleeve and outer sheath (usually printed cardboard) in which a vinyl record is stored
  - Liner notes, text printed on or accompanying the sheaths, cases and other forms of packaging in which vinyl records, CDs, DVDs, etc., are stored
- Bin liner, a protective layer fitted inside a bin
- Landfill liner, a membrane placed at the bottom of landfills
- Liner, an installation of well-drilling casing that does not extend to the surface
- Liner (sewing)
- Release liner, a paper or film used on labels and adhesive tapes to cover the adhesive until ready for use

== Transportation ==
- Airliner, a large fixed-wing aircraft for transporting passengers and cargo
- Ocean liner, a type of passenger ship used primarily for long-distance transportation
- Cruise ship, also known as a cruise liner, a passenger ship used primarily for recreation
- Ship of the line, a type of warship used from the 17th century to the 19th century

== Other uses ==
- Liner (baseball) or "line drive", a type of baseball stroke
- Linerboard or "liner", a type of paperboard used in making corrugated fiberboard
- Low-ionization nuclear emission-line region (LINER), a class of galactic nuclei (also used to refer to galaxies with such nuclei)
- Liner (band), a reincarnation of the British rock band Blackfoot Sue
- R-29RMU2 Layner (Liner), Russian submarine-launched missile
- Liner (radio), a pre-recorded station identifier
