= Solneman der Unsichtbare =

1914 novel by Alexander Moritz Frey

- Author: Alexander Moritz Frey
- Illustrator: Otto Nückel
- Language: German
- Publisher: Neue Zürcher Zeitung; Delphin-Verlag
- Publication date: 1914
- Publication place: Switzerland; Germany
- Pages: 194

Solneman der Unsichtbare (lit. 'Solneman the Invisible') is a 1914 novel by the German writer Alexander Moritz Frey. It is about a mysterious masked man who buys a park in a large German city and hides it behind a high wall, which raises questions and creates worry among the public. The story mixes satire and speculative fiction.

The novel was serialised in the Neue Zürcher Zeitung in 1914 and published by Delphin-Verlag in Munich the same year. The original edition features 13 woodcut illustrations by Otto Nückel. A reprint in the Neue Zürcher Zeitung was cancelled due to the outbreak of World War I.

The book was a breakthrough for Frey and made him known to the general public in German-speaking countries.
