= Turbofan =

Airbreathing jet engine designed to provide thrust by driving a fan

Animation of a 2-spool, high-bypass turbofan: 1. Low-pressure spool; 2. High-pressure spool; 3. Stationary components; 1. Nacelle; 2. Fan; 3. Low-pressure compressor; 4. High-pressure compressor; 5. Combustion chamber; 6. High-pressure turbine; 7. Low-pressure turbine; 8. Core nozzle; 9. Fan nozzle

A turbofan or fanjet is a type of airbreathing jet engine that is widely used in aircraft propulsion. The word "turbofan" is a combination of references to the preceding generation engine technology of the turbojet and the additional fan stage. It consists of a gas turbine engine which adds kinetic energy to the air passing through it by burning fuel, and a ducted fan powered by energy from the gas turbine to force air rearwards. Whereas all the air taken in by a turbojet passes through the combustion chamber and turbines, in a turbofan some of the air entering the nacelle bypasses these components. A turbofan can be thought of as a turbojet being used to drive a ducted fan, with both of these contributing to the thrust.

The ratio of the mass-flow of air bypassing the engine core to the mass-flow of air passing through the core is referred to as the bypass ratio. The engine produces thrust through a combination of these two portions working together. Engines that use more jet thrust relative to fan thrust are known as low-bypass turbofans; conversely those that have considerably more fan thrust than jet thrust are known as high-bypass. Most commercial aviation jet engines in use are of the high-bypass type, and most modern fighter engines are low-bypass. Afterburners are used on low-bypass turbofan engines with bypass and core mixing before the afterburner.

Modern turbofans have either a large single-stage fan or a smaller fan with several stages. An early configuration combined a low-pressure turbine and fan in a single rear-mounted unit.

== Principles ==
Schematic diagram illustrating a modern 2-spool turbofan engine installation in a nacelle. The low-pressure spool is colored blue and the high-pressure one orange.

The turbofan was invented to improve the fuel consumption of the turbojet. It achieves this by pushing more air, thus increasing the mass and lowering the speed of the propelling jet compared to that of the turbojet. This is done by adding a ducted fan.

Frank Whittle envisioned flight speeds of 500 mph in his March 1936 UK patent 471,368 "Improvements relating to the propulsion of aircraft", in which he describes the principles behind the turbofan, although not called as such at that time. While the turbojet uses the gas from its thermodynamic cycle as its propelling jet, for aircraft speeds below 500 mph there are two penalties to this design which are addressed by the turbofan.

First, the energy required for a given thrust increases as the exhaust air is propelled at ever greater speeds, so the efficiency can be improved by diverting energy to propel larger quantities of air at lower speeds than the core. A turbofan achieves this by using an additional turbine to drive a ducted fan to blow air that bypasses the core. With a lower thrust from the hot nozzle, most of the thrust now comes from the large mass flow of low speed bypass air, providing the same thrust with a reduced specific fuel consumption.

The other penalty relates to trying to improve the thermal efficiency of the engine by increasing pressure ratio and turbine temperature. This causes a corresponding increase in pressure and temperature in the exhaust duct which in turn gives a higher gas speed from the propelling nozzle (and higher KE and wasted fuel). The increase in thermal efficiency is at the expense of a worse propulsive efficiency with the net effect being a lower overall efficiency. In other words, the independence of thermal and propulsive efficiencies, as exists with the piston engine/propeller combination which preceded the turbojet, is lost. In contrast, Roth considers regaining this independence the single most important feature of the turbofan which allows specific thrust to be chosen independently of the gas generator cycle.

The working substance of the thermodynamic cycle is the only mass accelerated to produce thrust in a turbojet which is a serious limitation (high fuel consumption) for aircraft speeds below supersonic. For subsonic flight speeds the speed of the propelling jet has to be reduced because there is a price to be paid in producing the thrust. The energy required to accelerate the gas inside the engine (increase in kinetic energy) is expended in two ways, by producing a change in momentum (i.e., a force), and a wake which is an unavoidable consequence of producing thrust by an airbreathing engine (or propeller). The wake velocity, and fuel burned to produce it, can be reduced and the required thrust still maintained by increasing the mass accelerated. A turbofan does this by transferring energy available inside the engine, from the gas generator, to a ducted fan which produces a second, additional mass of accelerated air.

The transfer of energy from the core to bypass air results in lower pressure and temperature gas entering the core nozzle (lower exhaust velocity), and fan-produced higher pressure and temperature bypass-air entering the fan nozzle. The amount of energy transferred depends on how much pressure rise the fan is designed to produce (fan pressure ratio). The best energy exchange (lowest fuel consumption) between the two flows, and how the jet velocities compare, depends on how efficiently the transfer takes place which depends on the losses in the fan-turbine and fan.

The fan flow has lower exhaust velocity, giving much more thrust per unit energy (lower specific thrust). Both airstreams contribute to the gross thrust of the engine. The additional air for the bypass stream increases the ram drag in the air intake stream-tube, but there is still a significant increase in net thrust. The overall effective exhaust velocity of the two exhaust jets can be made closer to a normal subsonic aircraft's flight speed and gets closer to the ideal Froude efficiency. A turbofan accelerates a larger mass of air more slowly, compared to a turbojet which accelerates a smaller amount more quickly, which is a less efficient way to generate the same thrust (see the efficiency section below).

The ratio of the mass-flow of air bypassing the engine core compared to the mass-flow of air passing through the core is referred to as the bypass ratio. Engines with more jet thrust relative to fan thrust are known as low-bypass turbofans, those that have considerably more fan thrust than jet thrust are known as high-bypass. Most commercial aviation jet engines in use are high-bypass, and most modern fighter engines are low-bypass. Afterburners are used on low-bypass turbofans on combat aircraft.

=== Bypass ratio ===
The bypass ratio (BPR) of a turbofan engine is the ratio between the mass flow rate of the bypass stream to the mass flow rate entering the core. A bypass ratio of 6, for example, means that 6 times more air passes through the bypass duct than the amount that passes through the combustion chamber.

Turbofan engines are usually described in terms of BPR, which together with overall pressure ratio, turbine inlet temperature and fan pressure ratio are important design parameters. In addition BPR is quoted for turboprop and unducted fan installations because their high propulsive efficiency gives them the overall efficiency characteristics of very high bypass turbofans. This allows them to be shown together with turbofans on plots which show trends of reducing specific fuel consumption (SFC) with increasing BPR. BPR can also be quoted for lift fan installations where the fan airflow is remote from the engine and doesn't flow past the engine core.

Considering a constant core (i.e. fixed pressure ratio and turbine inlet temperature), core and bypass jet velocities equal and a particular flight condition (i.e. Mach number and altitude) the fuel consumption per lb of thrust (sfc) decreases with increase in BPR. At the same time gross and net thrusts increase, but by different amounts. There is considerable potential for reducing fuel consumption for the same core cycle by increasing BPR.This is achieved because of the reduction in pounds of thrust per lb/sec of airflow (specific thrust) and the resultant reduction in lost kinetic energy in the jets (increase in propulsive efficiency).

If all the gas power from a gas turbine is converted to kinetic energy in a propelling nozzle, the aircraft is best suited to high supersonic speeds. If it is all transferred to a separate big mass of air with low kinetic energy, the aircraft is best suited to zero speed (hovering). For speeds in between, the gas power is shared between a separate airstream and the gas turbine's own nozzle flow in a proportion which gives the aircraft performance required. The trade off between mass flow and velocity is also seen with propellers and helicopter rotors by comparing disc loading and power loading. For example, the same helicopter weight can be supported by a high power engine and small diameter rotor or, for less fuel, a lower power engine and bigger rotor with lower velocity through the rotor.

Bypass usually refers to transferring gas power from a gas turbine to a bypass stream of air to reduce fuel consumption and jet noise. Alternatively, there may be a requirement for an afterburning engine where the sole requirement for bypass is to provide cooling air. This sets the lower limit for BPR and these engines have been called "leaky" or continuous bleed turbojets (General Electric YJ-101 BPR 0.25) and low BPR turbojets (Pratt & Whitney PW1120). Low BPR (0.2) has also been used to provide surge margin as well as afterburner cooling for the Pratt & Whitney J58.

=== Efficiency ===
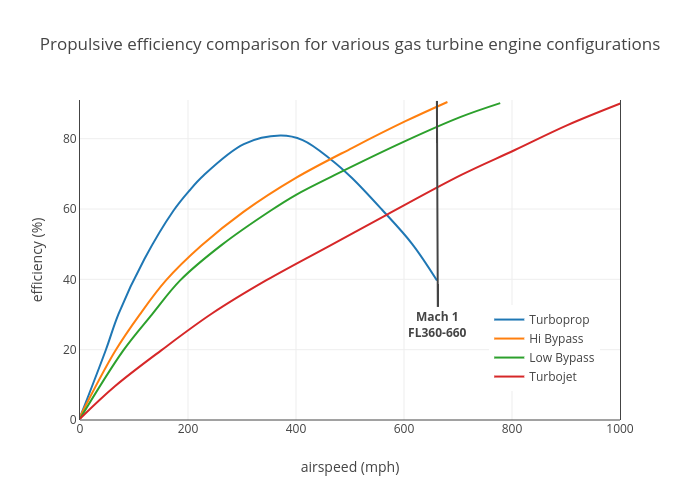
Propulsive efficiency comparison for various gas turbine engine configurations

Propeller engines are most efficient for low speeds, turbojet engines for high speeds, and turbofan engines between the two. Turbofans are the most efficient engines in the range of speeds from about 500 to 1,000 km/h (270 to 540 kn; 310 to 620 mph), the speed at which most commercial aircraft operate.

In a turbojet (zero-bypass) engine, the high temperature and high pressure exhaust gas is accelerated when it undergoes expansion through a propelling nozzle and produces all the thrust. The compressor absorbs the mechanical power produced by the turbine. In a bypass design, extra turbines drive a ducted fan that accelerates air rearward from the front of the engine. In a high-bypass design, the ducted fan and nozzle produce most of the thrust. Turbofans are closely related to turboprops in principle because both transfer some of the gas turbine's gas power, using extra machinery, to a bypass stream leaving less for the hot nozzle to convert to kinetic energy. Turbofans represent an intermediate stage between turbojets, which derive all their thrust from exhaust gases, and turbo-props which derive minimal thrust from exhaust gases (typically 10% or less). Extracting shaft power and transferring it to a bypass stream introduces extra losses which are more than made up by the improved propulsive efficiency. The turboprop at its best flight speed gives significant fuel savings over a turbojet even though it has extra machinery (an extra turbine, a gearbox and a propeller), with its own losses, rather than the turbojet's simple low-loss nozzle.

Froude, or propulsive, efficiency can be defined as
$$\eta_f = \frac{2}{1 + \frac{V_j}{V_a}},$$
where

V_{j} = thrust equivalent jet velocity,
V_{a} = aircraft velocity.

=== Thrust ===
While a turbojet engine uses all of the engine's output to produce thrust in the form of a hot high-velocity exhaust gas jet, a turbofan's cool low-velocity bypass air yields between 30% and 70% of the total thrust produced by a turbofan system.

The thrust (F_{N}) generated by a turbofan depends on the effective exhaust velocity of the total exhaust, as with any jet engine, but because two exhaust jets are present the thrust equation can be expanded as
$$F_\text{N} = \dot{m}_\text{e} v_\text{he} - \dot{m}_\text{o} v_\text{o} + \text{BPR}\, (\dot{m}_\text{c}) v_\text{f},$$
where

$\dot m_\text{e}$ = the mass rate of hot combustion exhaust flow from the core engine,
$\dot m_\text{o}$ = the mass rate of total air flow entering the turbofan = $\dot m_\text{c} + \dot{m}_\text{f}$,
$\dot m_\text{c}$ = the mass rate of intake air that flows to the core engine,
$\dot m_\text{f}$ = the mass rate of intake air that bypasses the core engine,
$v_\text{f}$ = the velocity of the air flow bypassed around the core engine,
$v_\text{he}$ = the velocity of the hot exhaust gas from the core engine,
$v_\text{o}$ = the velocity of the total air intake = the true airspeed of the aircraft,
BPR = bypass ratio.

=== Nozzles ===
The cold duct and core duct's nozzle systems are relatively complex due to the use of two separate exhaust flows. In high bypass engines, the fan is situated in a short duct near the front of the engine and typically has a convergent cold nozzle, with the tail of the duct forming a low pressure ratio nozzle that under normal conditions will choke creating supersonic flow patterns around the core. The core nozzle is more conventional, but generates less of the thrust, and depending on design choices, such as noise considerations, may conceivably not choke. In low bypass engines the two flows may combine within the ducts, and share a common nozzle, which can be fitted with afterburner.

=== Noise ===
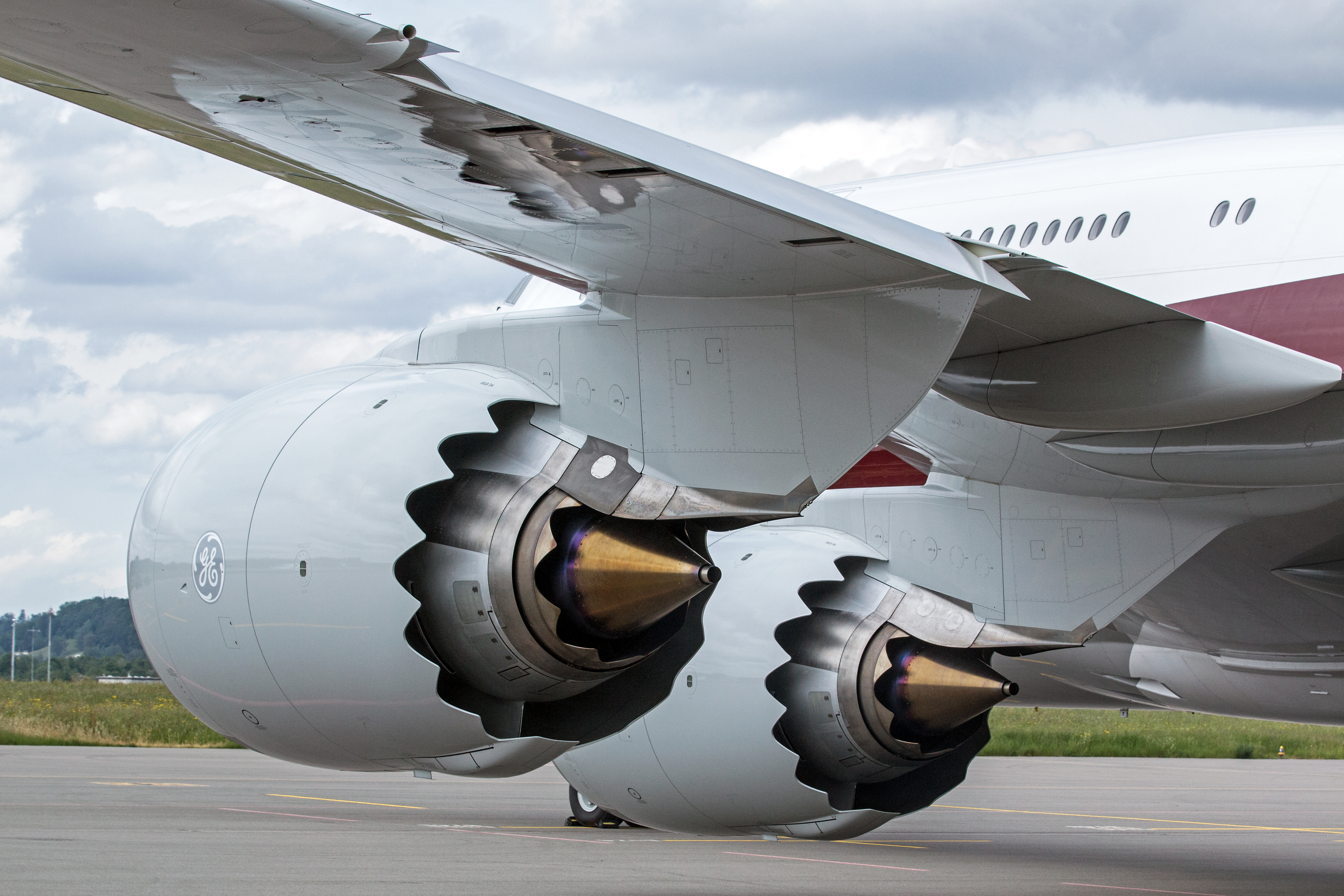
Chevrons on a 747-8's GEnx-2B

Most of the air flow through a high-bypass turbofan is lower-velocity bypass flow: even when combined with the much-higher-velocity engine exhaust, the average exhaust velocity is considerably lower than in a pure turbojet. Turbojet engine noise is predominately jet noise from the high exhaust velocity. Therefore, turbofan engines are significantly quieter than a pure-jet of the same thrust, and jet noise is no longer the predominant source. Turbofan engine noise propagates both upstream via the inlet and downstream via the primary nozzle and the by-pass duct. Other noise sources are the fan, compressor and turbine.

Modern commercial aircraft employ high-bypass-ratio (HBPR) engines with separate flow, non-mixing, short-duct exhaust systems. Their noise at takeoff is primarily from the fan and jet. The primary source of jet noise is the turbulent mixing of shear layers in the engine's exhaust. These shear layers contain instabilities that lead to highly turbulent vortices that generate the pressure fluctuations responsible for sound. To reduce the noise associated with jet flow, the aerospace industry has sought to disrupt shear layer turbulence and reduce the overall noise produced.

Fan noise may come from the interaction of the fan-blade wakes with the pressure field of the downstream fan-exit stator vanes. It may be minimized by adequate axial spacing between blade trailing edge and stator entrance. At high engine speeds, as at takeoff, shock waves from the supersonic fan tips, because of their unequal nature, produce noise of a discordant nature known as "buzz saw" noise.

All modern turbofan engines have acoustic liners in the nacelle to damp their noise. They extend as much as possible to cover the largest surface area. The acoustic performance of the engine can be experimentally evaluated by means of ground tests or in dedicated experimental test rigs.

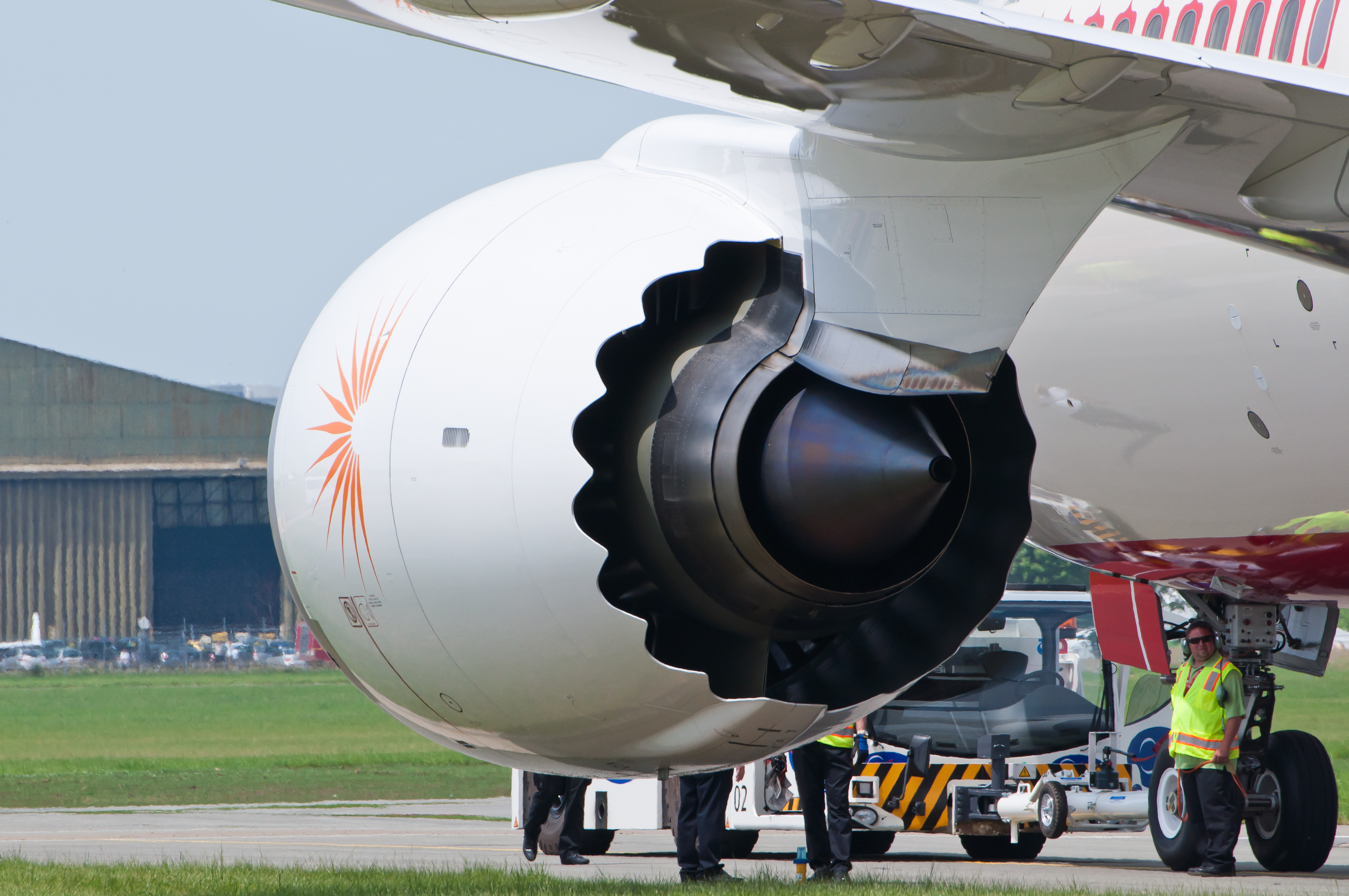
Chevrons on the GEnx-1B engines on an Air India Boeing 787

In the aerospace industry, chevrons are the serrated or "saw-tooth" patterns on the trailing edges of some jet engine nacelles and exhaust nozzles that are used for noise reduction. The sawtooth geometry of the edges smooths the mixing of high velocity hot air from the engine core and slower moving cooler bypass (or ambient) air by creating streamwise vortices at the interface, which in turn reduces noise-creating turbulence. NASA contracted with General Electric and Pratt & Whitney to research and develop mixing methods in the mid 1990s and early 2000s. Chevrons do however induce drag resulting in a slight thrust loss. Some notable examples of such designs are Boeing 787, Boeing 737 Max and Boeing 747-8 – on the Rolls-Royce Trent 1000 (787), General Electric GEnx (787, 747-8) and CFM LEAP (1B variant only; 737 Max) engines.

== History ==
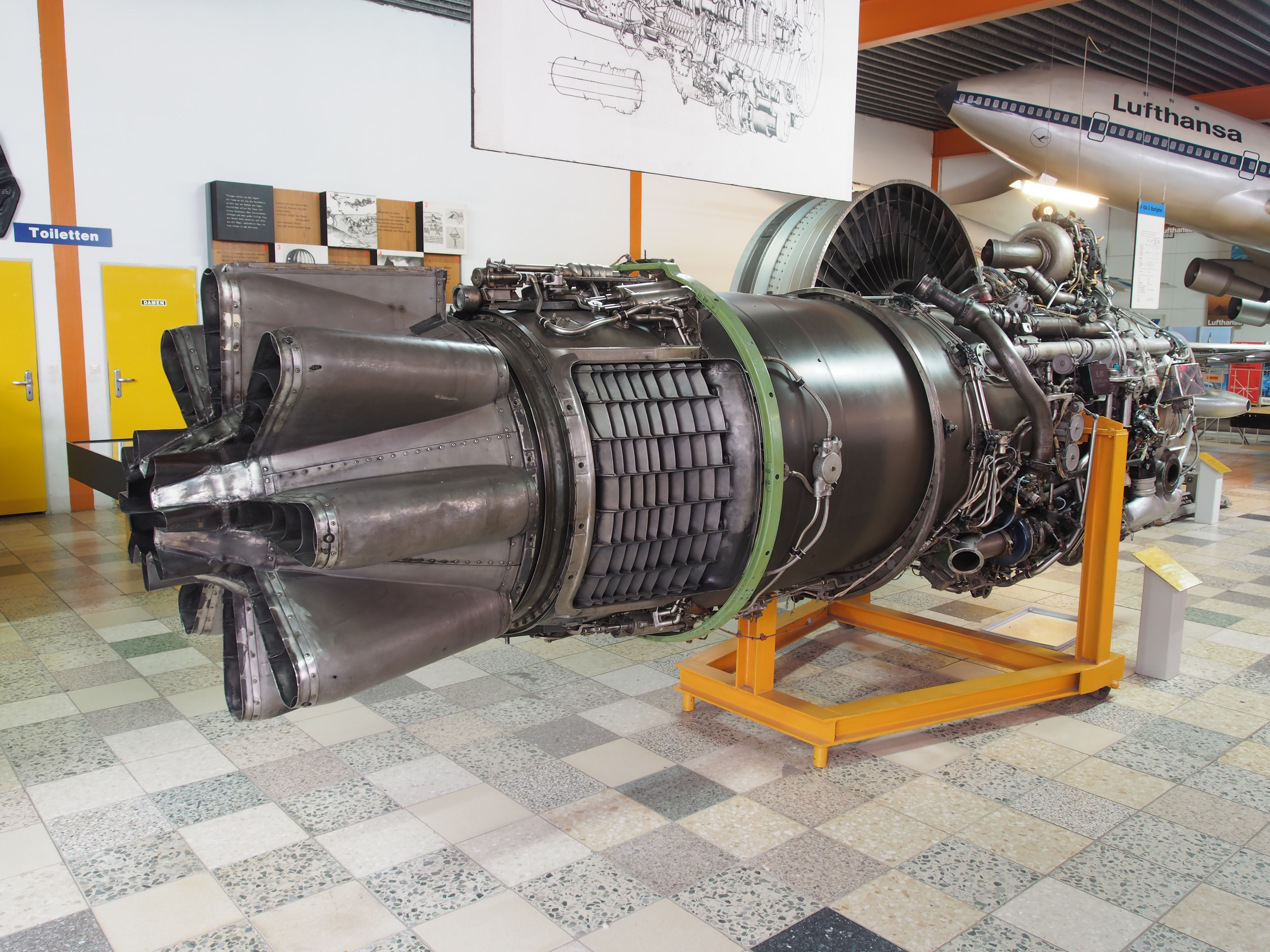
Rolls-Royce Conway low-bypass turbofan from a Boeing 707. The bypass air exits from the fins, while the exhaust from the core exits from the central nozzle. This fluted jetpipe design is a noise-reducing method devised by Frederick Greatorex at Rolls-Royce

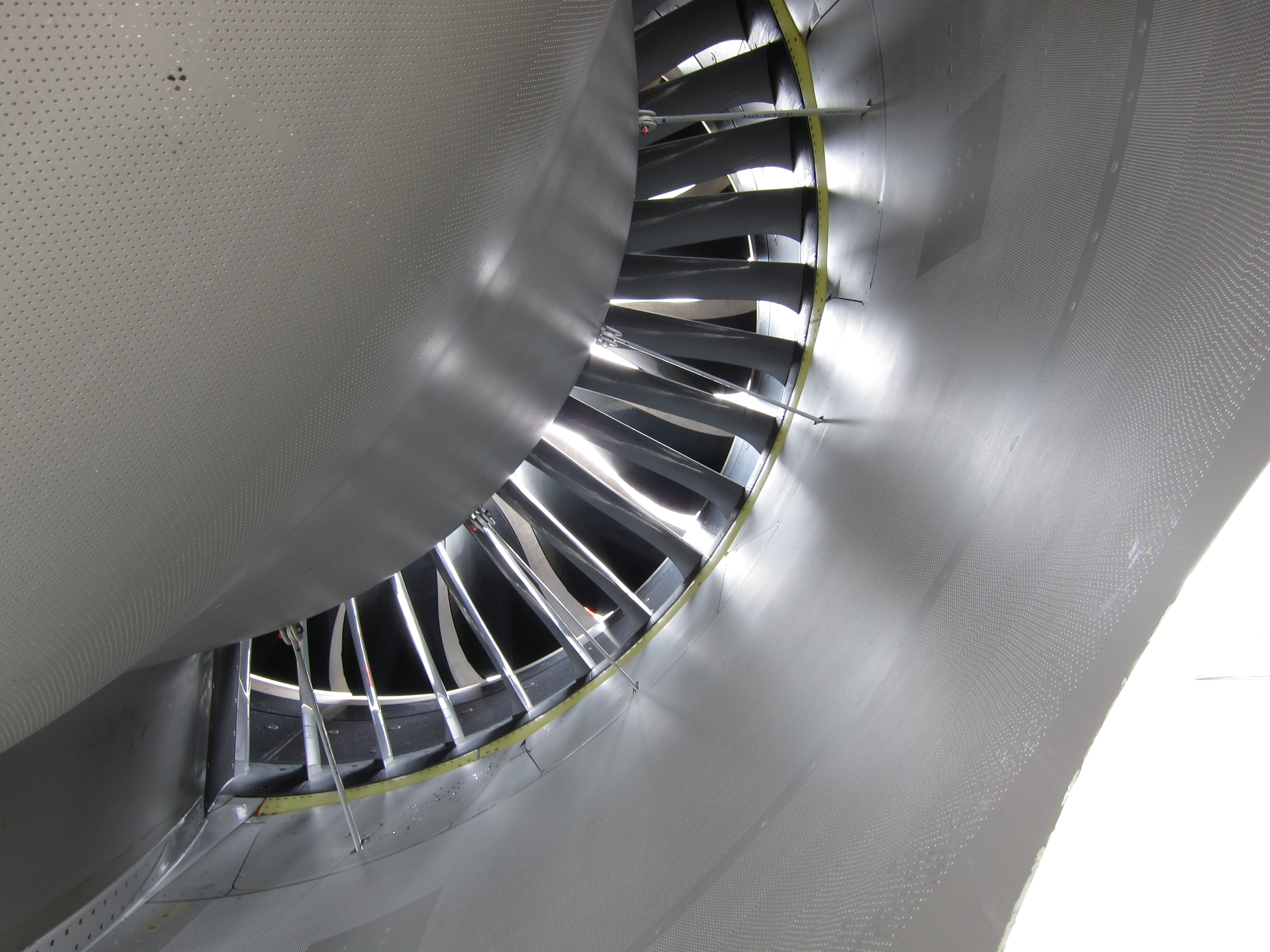
General Electric GEnx-2B turbofan engine as used on a Boeing 747–8. View into the bypass duct looking forward from the bypass nozzle and showing fan exit stators/fan blades

Early turbojet engines were not very fuel-efficient because their overall pressure ratio and turbine inlet temperature were severely limited by the technology and materials available at the time.

The first turbofan engine, which was only run on a test bed, was the German Daimler-Benz DB 670, designated the 109-007 by the German RLM (Ministry of Aviation), with a first run date of 27 May 1943, after the testing of the turbomachinery using an electric motor, which had been undertaken on 1 April 1943. Development of the engine was abandoned with its problems unsolved, as the war situation worsened for Germany.

Later in 1943, the British ground tested the Metrovick F.3 turbofan, which used the Metrovick F.2 turbojet as a gas generator with the exhaust discharging into a close-coupled aft-fan module comprising a contra-rotating LP turbine system driving two co-axial contra-rotating fans.

Improved materials, and the introduction of twin compressors, such as in the Bristol Olympus, and Pratt & Whitney JT3C engines, increased the overall pressure ratio and thus the thermodynamic efficiency of engines. They also had poor propulsive efficiency, because pure turbojets have a high specific thrust/high velocity exhaust, which is better suited to supersonic flight.

The original low-bypass turbofan engines were designed to improve propulsive efficiency by reducing the exhaust velocity to a value closer to that of the aircraft. The Rolls-Royce Conway, the world's first production turbofan, had a bypass ratio of 0.3, similar to the modern General Electric F404 fighter engine. Civilian turbofan engines of the 1960s, such as the Pratt & Whitney JT8D and the Rolls-Royce Spey, had bypass ratios closer to 1 and were similar to their military equivalents.

The first Soviet airliner powered by turbofan engines was the Tupolev Tu-124 introduced in 1962. It used the Soloviev D-20. 164 aircraft were produced between 1960 and 1965 for Aeroflot and other Eastern Bloc airlines, with some operating until the early 1990s.

The first General Electric turbofan was the aft-fan CJ805-23, based on the CJ805-3 turbojet. It was followed by the aft-fan General Electric CF700 engine, with a 2.0 bypass ratio. This was derived from the General Electric J85/CJ610 turbojet 2,850 lbf (12,700 N) to power the larger Rockwell Sabreliner 75/80 model aircraft, as well as the Dassault Falcon 20, with about a 50% increase in thrust to 4,200 lbf (19,000 N). The CF700 was the first small turbofan to be certified by the Federal Aviation Administration (FAA). There were at one time over 400 CF700 aircraft in operation around the world, with an experience base of over 10 million service hours. The CF700 turbofan engine was also used to train Moon-bound astronauts in Project Apollo as the powerplant for the Lunar Landing Research Vehicle.

== Common types ==
=== Low-bypass turbofan ===
Schematic diagram illustrating a 2-spool, low-bypass turbofan engine with a mixed exhaust, showing the low-pressure (green) and high-pressure (purple) spools. The fan (and booster stages) are driven by the low-pressure turbine, whereas the high-pressure compressor is powered by the high-pressure turbine.

A high-specific-thrust/low-bypass-ratio turbofan normally has a multi-stage fan behind inlet guide vanes, developing a relatively high pressure ratio and, thus, yielding a high (mixed or cold) exhaust velocity. The core airflow needs to be large enough to ensure there is sufficient core power to drive the fan. A smaller core flow/higher bypass ratio cycle can be achieved by raising the inlet temperature of the high-pressure (HP) turbine rotor.

To illustrate one aspect of how a turbofan differs from a turbojet, comparisons can be made at the same airflow (to keep a common intake for example) and the same net thrust (i.e. same specific thrust). A bypass flow can be added only if the turbine inlet temperature is not too high to compensate for the smaller core flow. Future improvements in turbine cooling/material technology can allow higher turbine inlet temperature, which is necessary because of increased cooling air temperature, resulting from an overall pressure ratio increase.

The resulting turbofan, with reasonable efficiencies and duct loss for the added components, would probably operate at a higher nozzle pressure ratio than the turbojet, but with a lower exhaust temperature to retain net thrust. Since the temperature rise across the whole engine (intake to nozzle) would be lower, the (dry power) fuel flow would also be reduced, resulting in a better specific fuel consumption (SFC).

Some low-bypass ratio military turbofans (e.g. F404, JT8D) have variable inlet guide vanes to direct air onto the first fan rotor stage. This improves the fan surge margin (see compressor map).

Common low-bypass turbofans
Model	Used in
Pratt & Whitney JT8D	many early narrowbody jetliners
Soloviev D-30	Ilyushin Il-76 and Il-62M; Mikoyan MiG-31; Xian H-6K and Y-20
Saturn AL-31	Chengdu J-10 and J-20; Shenyang J-11, J-15 and J-16; Sukhoi Su-30 and Su-27
Shenyang WS-10	Chengdu J-10 and J-20; Shenyang J-11, J-15 and J-16
Williams F107	Raytheon BGM-109 Tomahawk cruise missile
NPO Saturn AL-55	HAL HJT-36 Sitara
Pratt & Whitney TF-30	Grumman F-14 Tomcat
Eurojet EJ200	Eurofighter Typhoon
Ishikawajima-Harima F3	Kawasaki T-4
GTRE GTX-35VS Kaveri	

=== Afterburning turbofan ===
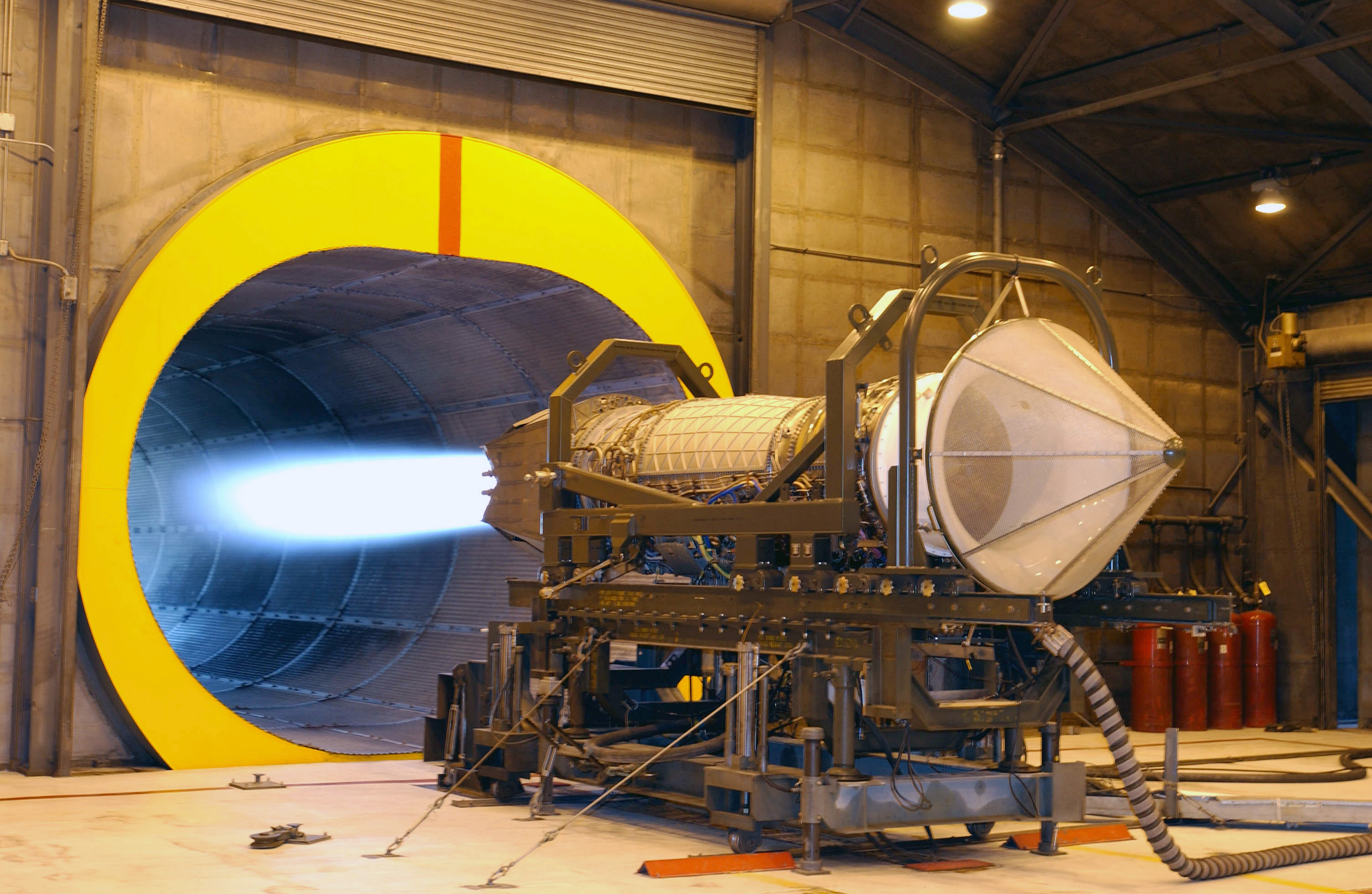
Pratt & Whitney F119 afterburning turbofan on test

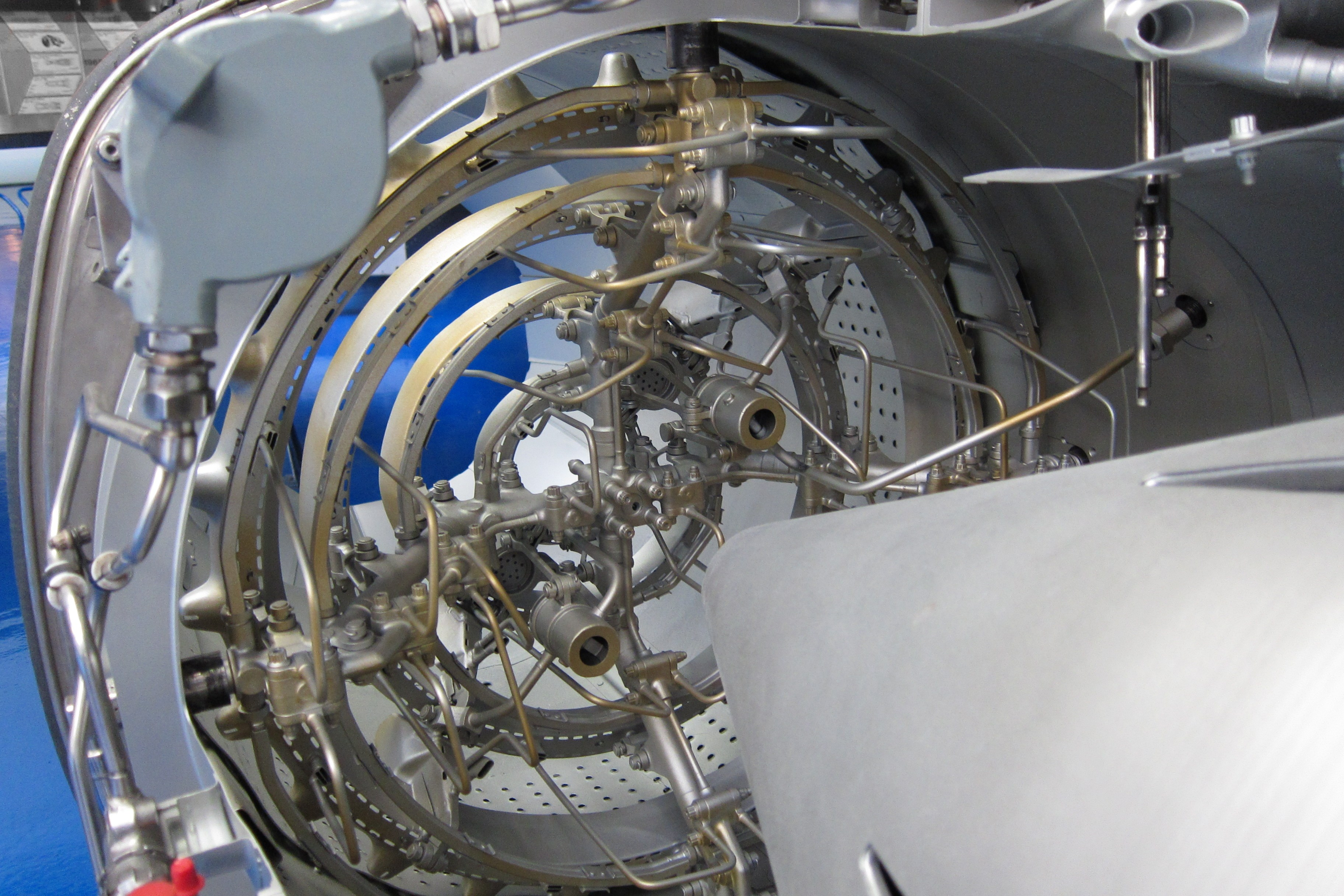
A cutaway view of a turbofan afterburner looking in the direction of the exhaust flow which has just left the turbine and the cold air flow which has just left the bypass duct (visible at top right). Four fuel spray rings and flame holders are shown covering the complete jetpipe area. The flame would be behind them where the perforated liner is visible.

Since the 1970s, most jet fighter engines have been low/medium bypass turbofans with a mixed exhaust, afterburner and variable area exit nozzle. An afterburner is a combustor located after the turbine blades and bypass duct in the jetpipe. It has its own fuel system with fuel nozzle rings, flame holders, igniters and a fuel control which ensures the correct nozzle area for the amount of fuel being burned. When in operation it raises the temperature of the turbine exhaust gas which increases the exhaust velocity and thrust. The exhaust nozzle has to open up to pass the bigger volume of exhaust and prevent the engine from being back-pressured more than when operating with no afterburning. Afterburning gives a significant thrust boost for take off, transonic acceleration and combat maneuvers, but uses fuel very rapidly which limits its use to very short periods.

Unlike in the main engine, where stoichiometric temperatures in the combustor have to be reduced before they reach the turbine, afterburning can approach stoichiometric temperatures as limited by combustion instabilities.

The first production afterburning turbofan engine was the Pratt & Whitney TF30, which initially powered the F-111 Aardvark and F-14 Tomcat. Low-bypass military turbofans include the Pratt & Whitney F119, the Eurojet EJ200, the General Electric F110, the Klimov RD-33, and the Saturn AL-31, all of which feature a mixed exhaust, afterburner and variable area propelling nozzle.

=== High-bypass turbofan ===
Schematic diagram illustrating a 2-spool, high-bypass turbofan engine with an unmixed exhaust. The low-pressure spool is coloured green and the high-pressure one purple. Again, the fan (and booster stages) are driven by the low-pressure turbine, but more stages are required. A mixed exhaust is often employed.

To further improve fuel economy and reduce noise, almost all jet airliners and most military transport aircraft (e.g., the C-17) are powered by low-specific-thrust/high-bypass-ratio turbofans. These engines evolved from the high-specific-thrust/low-bypass-ratio turbofans used in such aircraft in the 1960s. Some such aircraft use turboprops instead.

Low specific thrust is achieved by replacing the multi-stage fan with a single-stage unit. Unlike some military engines, modern civil turbofans lack stationary inlet guide vanes in front of the fan rotor. The fan is scaled to achieve the desired net thrust.

The core (or gas generator) of the engine must generate enough power to drive the fan at its rated mass flow and pressure ratio. Improvements in turbine cooling/material technology allow for a higher (HP) turbine rotor inlet temperature, which allows a smaller (and lighter) core, potentially improving the core thermal efficiency. Reducing the core mass flow tends to increase the load on the LP turbine, so this unit may require additional stages to reduce the average stage loading and to maintain LP turbine efficiency. Reducing core flow also increases bypass ratio. Bypass ratios greater than 5:1 are increasingly common; the Pratt & Whitney PW1000G, which entered commercial service in 2016, attains 12.5:1.

Further improvements in core thermal efficiency can be achieved by raising the overall pressure ratio of the core. Improvements in blade aerodynamics can reduce the number of extra compressor stages required, and variable geometry stators enable high-pressure-ratio compressors to work surge-free at all throttle settings.

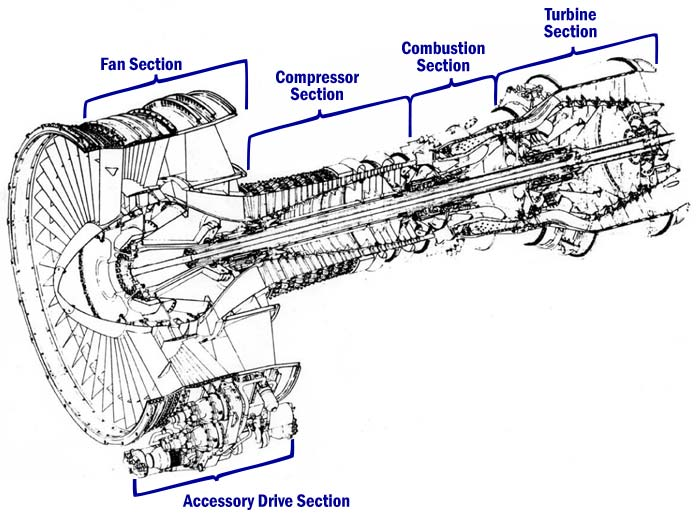
Cutaway diagram of the General Electric CF6-6 engine

The first (experimental) high-bypass turbofan engine was the AVCO-Lycoming PLF1A-2, a Honeywell T55 turboshaft-derived engine that was first run in February 1962. The PLF1A-2 had a 40 in diameter (100 cm) geared fan stage, produced a static thrust of 4,320 lb (1,960 kg), and had a bypass ratio of 6:1. The General Electric TF39 became the first production model, designed to power the Lockheed C-5 Galaxy military transport aircraft. The civil General Electric CF6 engine used a derived design. Other high-bypass turbofans are the Pratt & Whitney JT9D, the three-shaft Rolls-Royce RB211 and the CFM International CFM56; also the smaller TF34. More recent large high-bypass turbofans include the Pratt & Whitney PW4000, the three-shaft Rolls-Royce Trent, the General Electric GE90/GEnx, and the GP7000, produced jointly by GE and P&W. The Pratt & Whitney JT9D engine was the first high bypass ratio jet engine to power a wide-body airliner.

The lower the specific thrust of a turbofan, the lower the mean jet outlet velocity, which in turn translates into a high thrust lapse rate (i.e. decreasing thrust with increasing flight speed). See technical discussion below, item 2. Consequently, an engine sized to propel an aircraft at high subsonic flight speed (e.g., Mach 0.83) generates a relatively high thrust at low flight speed, thus enhancing runway performance. Low specific thrust engines tend to have a high bypass ratio, but this is also a function of the temperature of the turbine system.

The turbofans on twin-engined transport aircraft produce enough take-off thrust to continue a take-off on one engine if the other engine shuts down after a critical point in the take-off run. From that point on the aircraft has less than half the thrust compared to two operating engines because the non-functioning engine is a source of drag. Modern twin engined airliners normally climb very steeply immediately after take-off. If one engine shuts down, the climb-out is much shallower, but sufficient to clear obstacles in the flightpath.

Engine technology was less advanced in the Soviet Union than in the West, and its first wide-body aircraft, the Ilyushin Il-86, was powered by low-bypass engines. The Yakovlev Yak-42, a medium-range, rear-engined aircraft seating up to 120 passengers, introduced in 1980, was the first Soviet aircraft to use high-bypass engines.

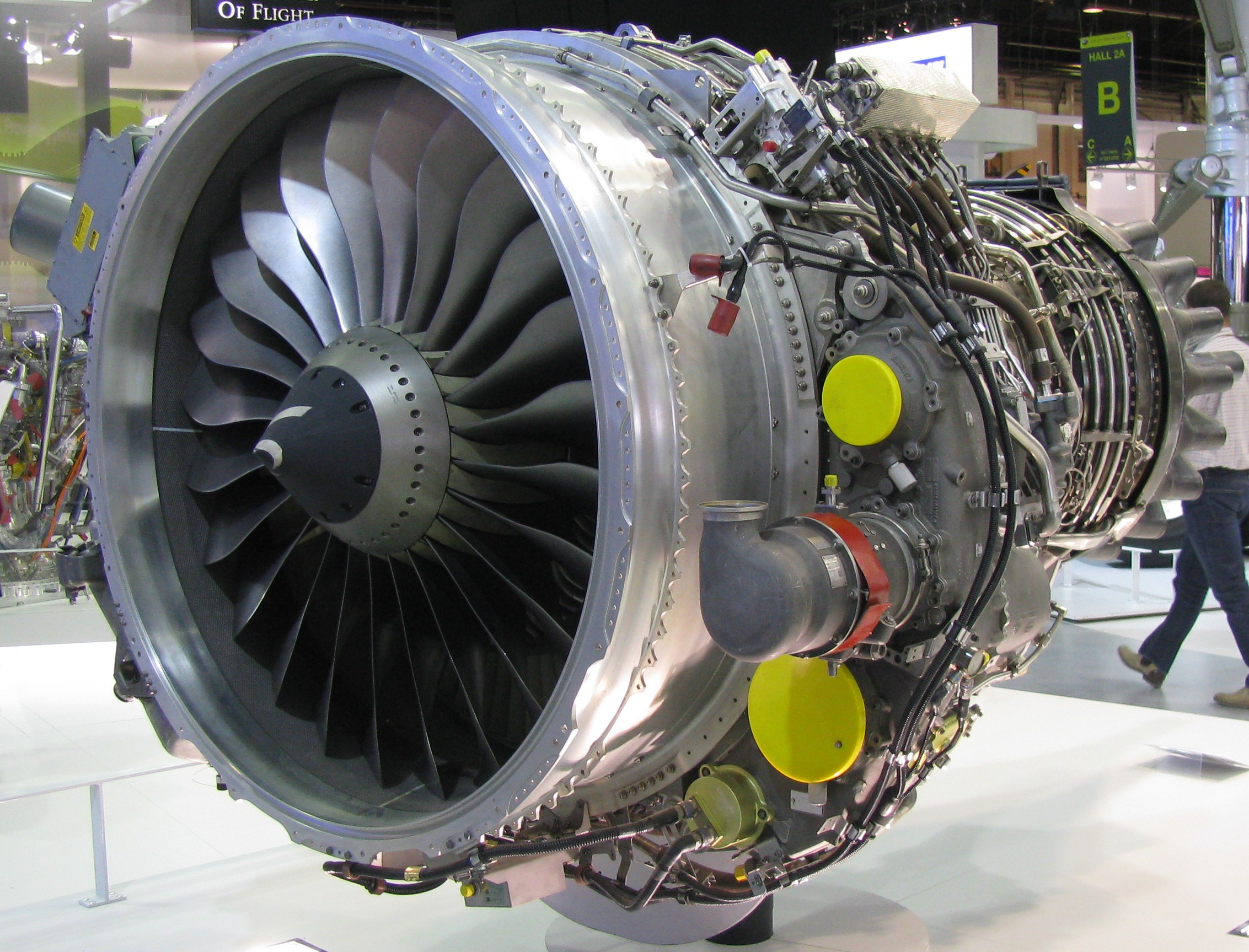
PowerJet SaM146, which powers the Sukhoi Superjet 100

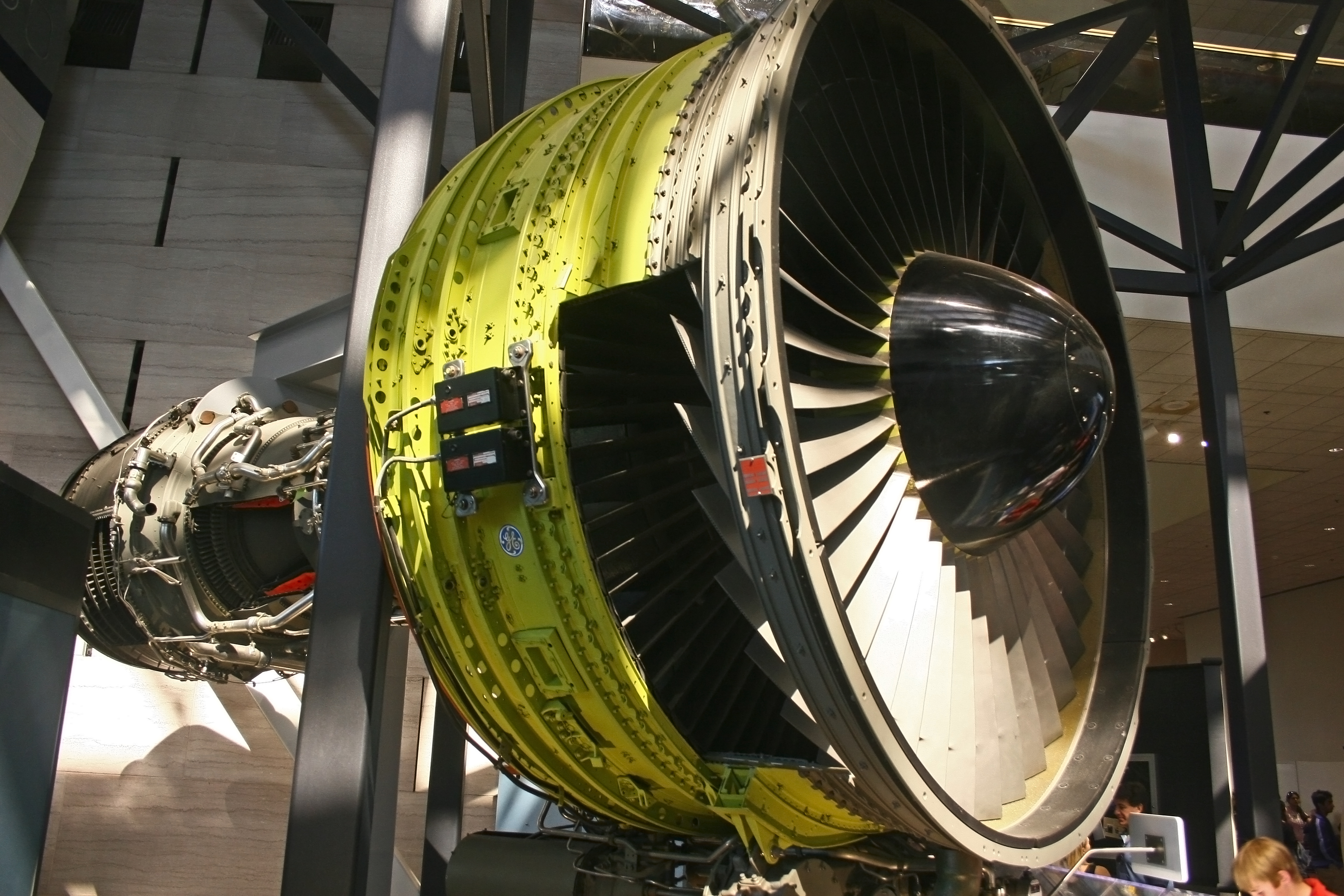
General Electric CF6, which powers the Airbus A300, Boeing 747, Douglas DC-10 and other aircraft

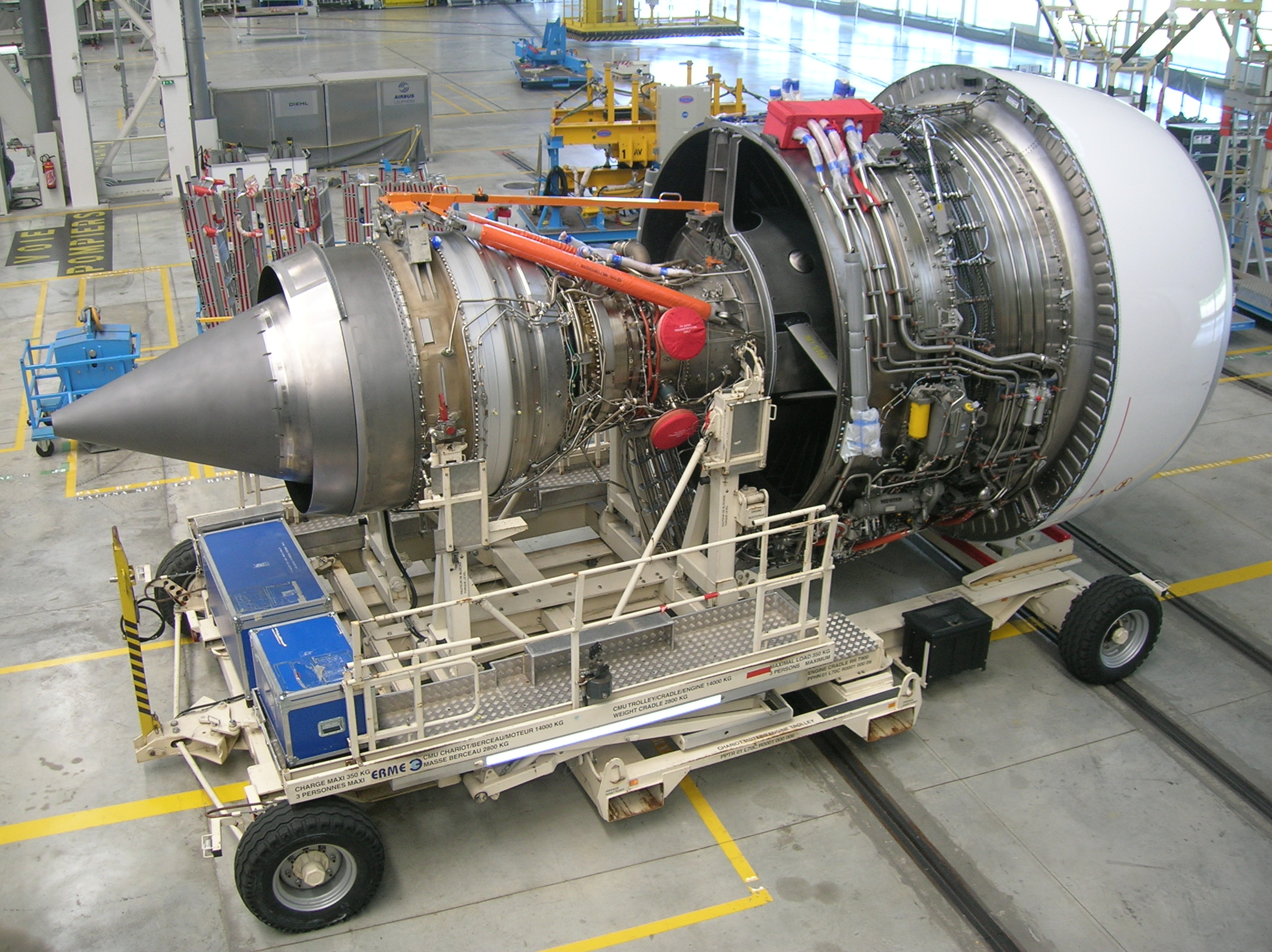
Rolls-Royce Trent 900, powering the Airbus A380

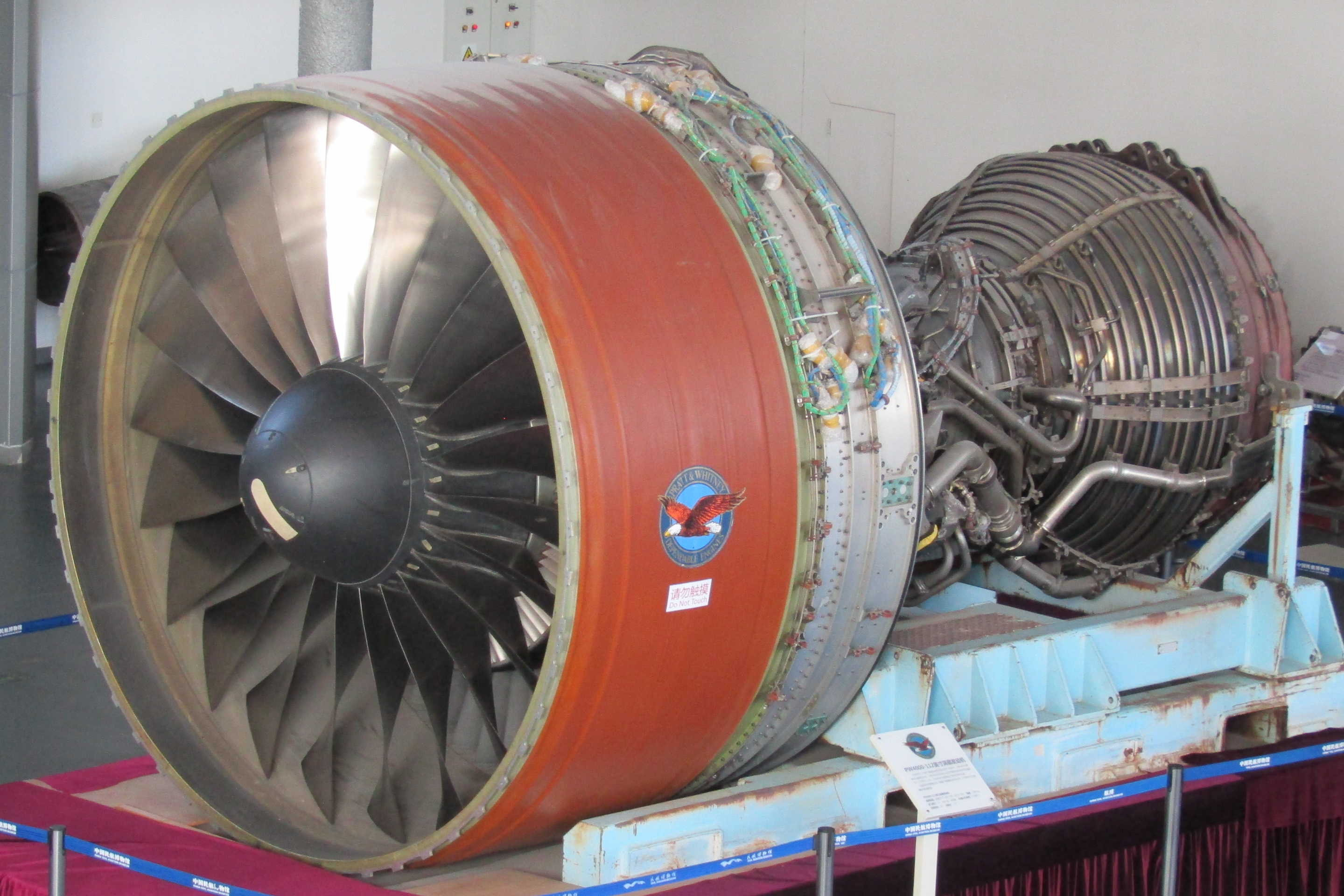
Pratt & Whitney PW4000, powering the Boeing 777, MD-11 and Airbus A330

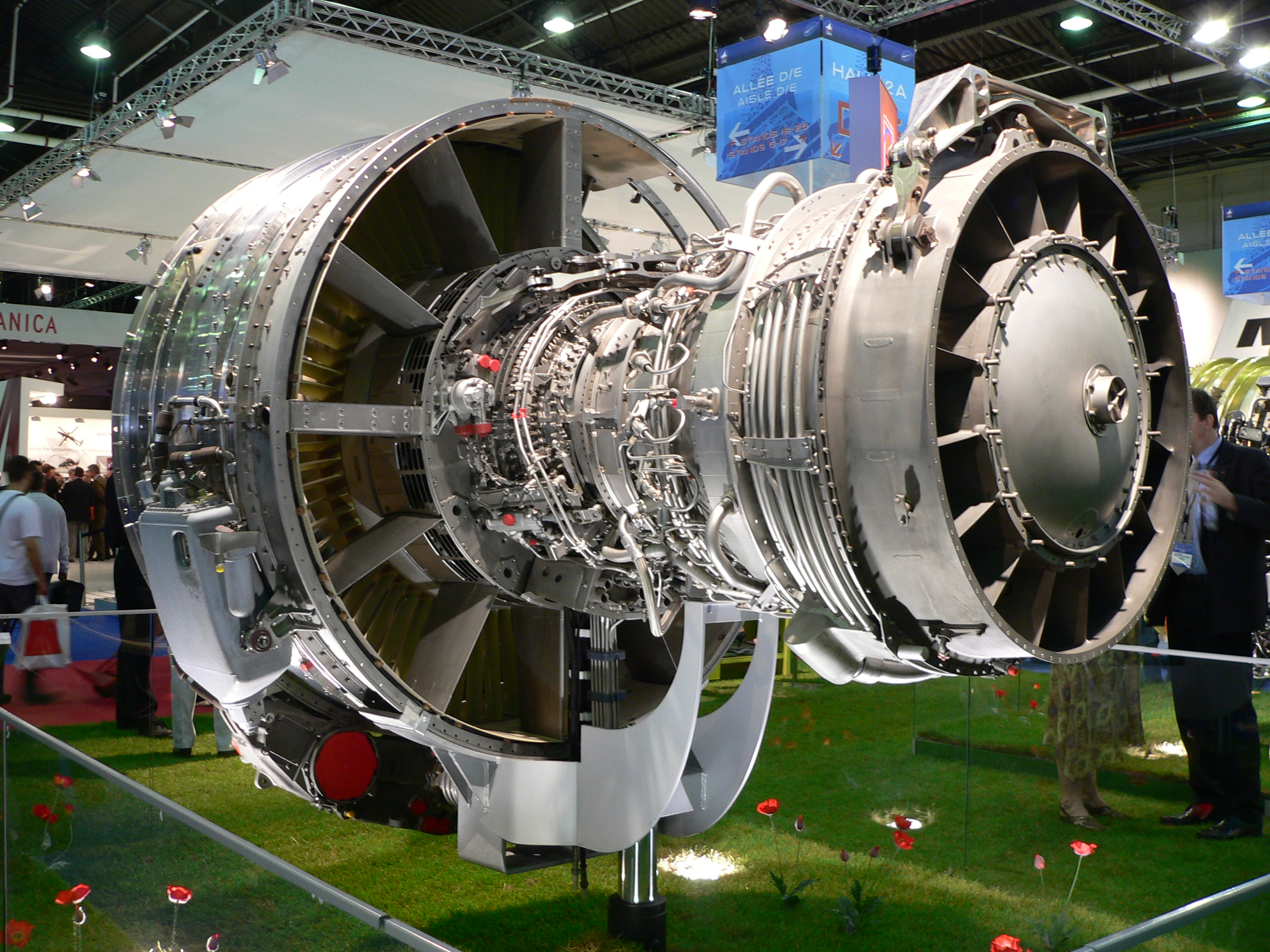
The CFM56, which powers the Boeing 737, the Airbus A320 and other aircraft

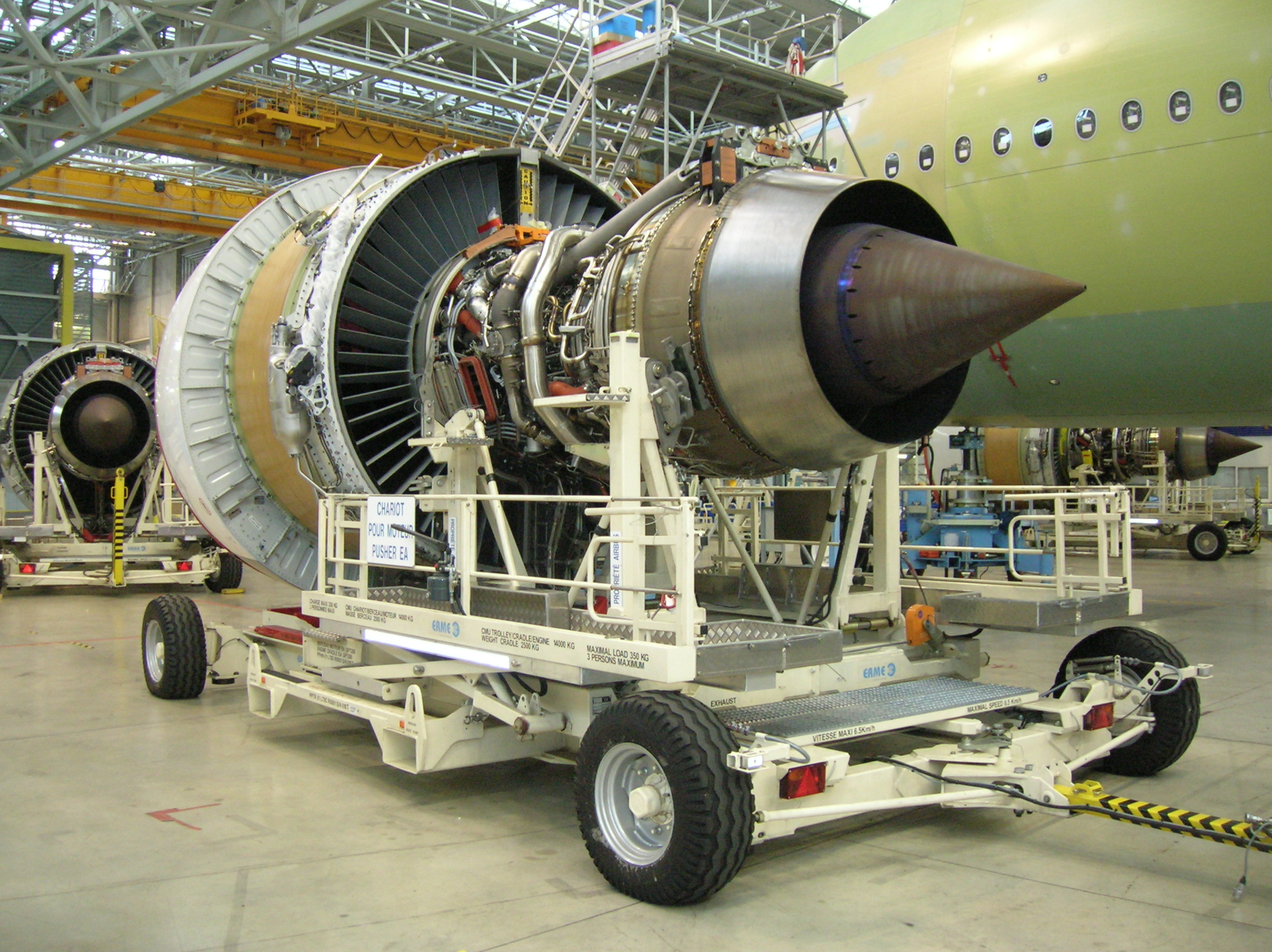
Engine Alliance GP7000 turbofan for the Airbus A380

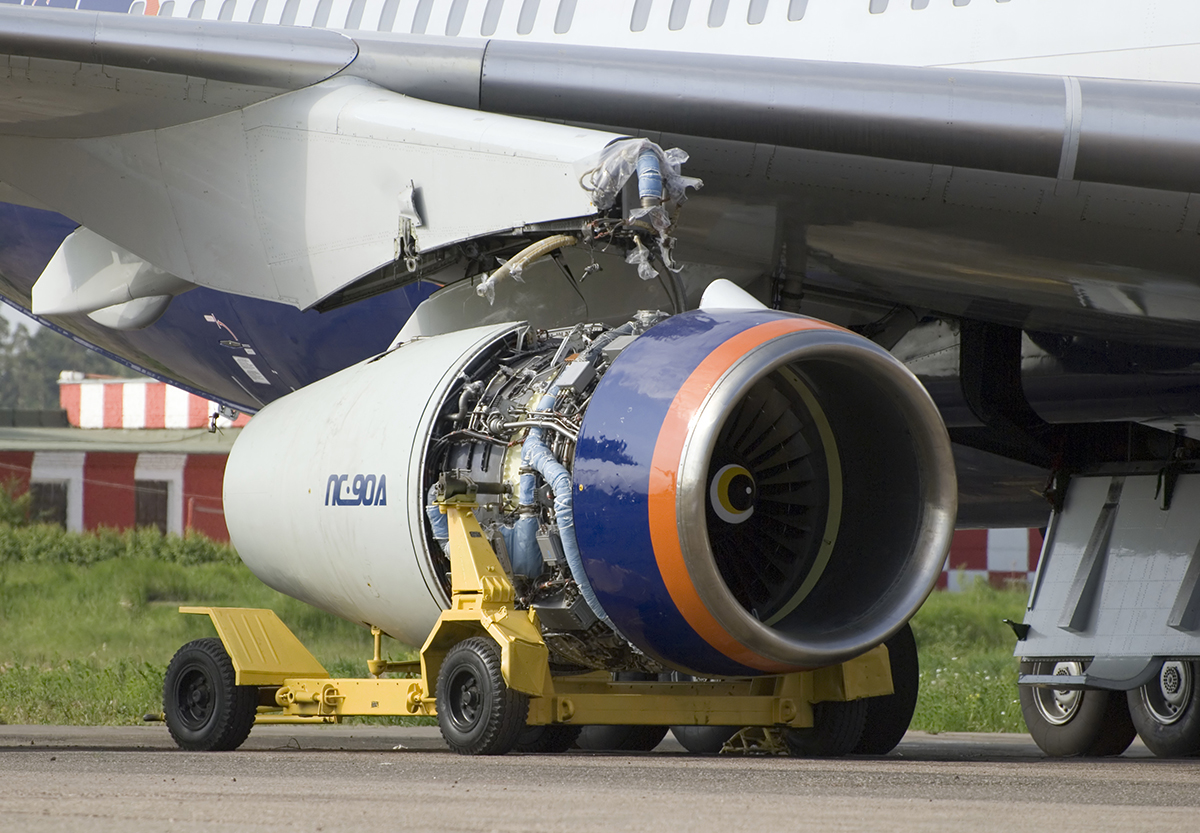
Aviadvigatel PS-90, which powers the Ilyushin Il-96, Tupolev Tu-204, and Ilyushin Il-76

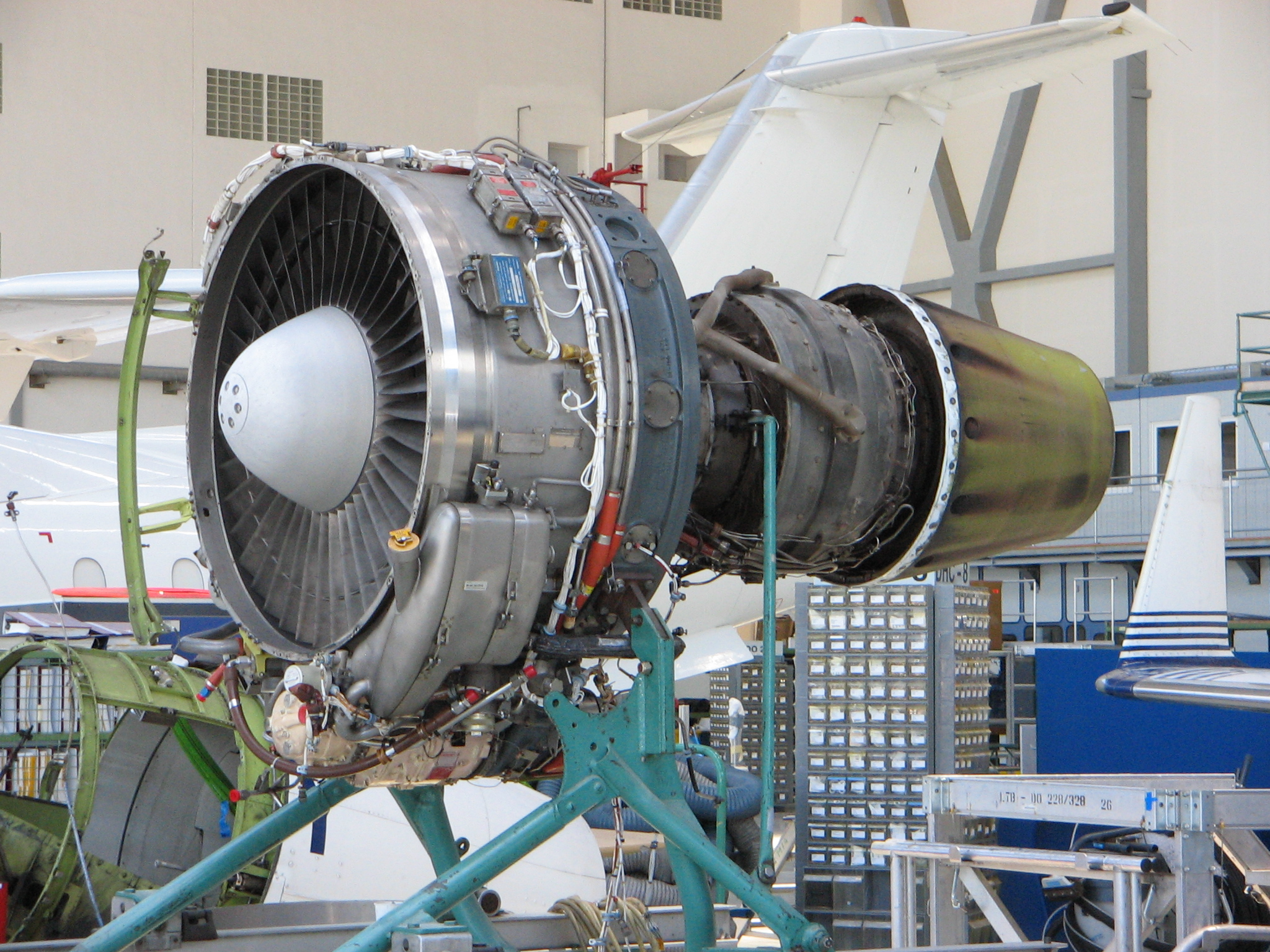
Lycoming ALF 502, which powers the British Aerospace 146

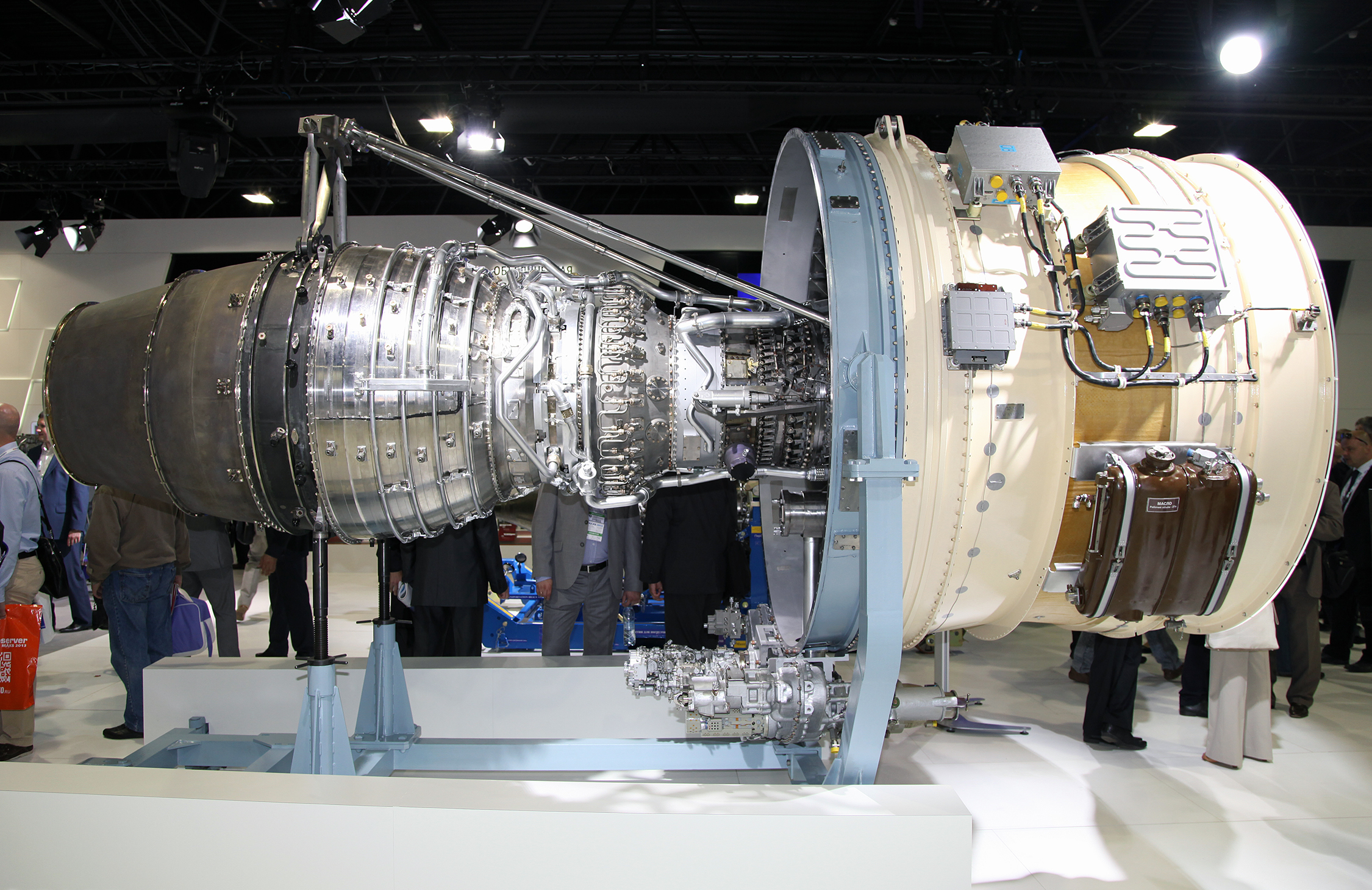
Aviadvigatel PD-14, which is used on the Irkut MC-21

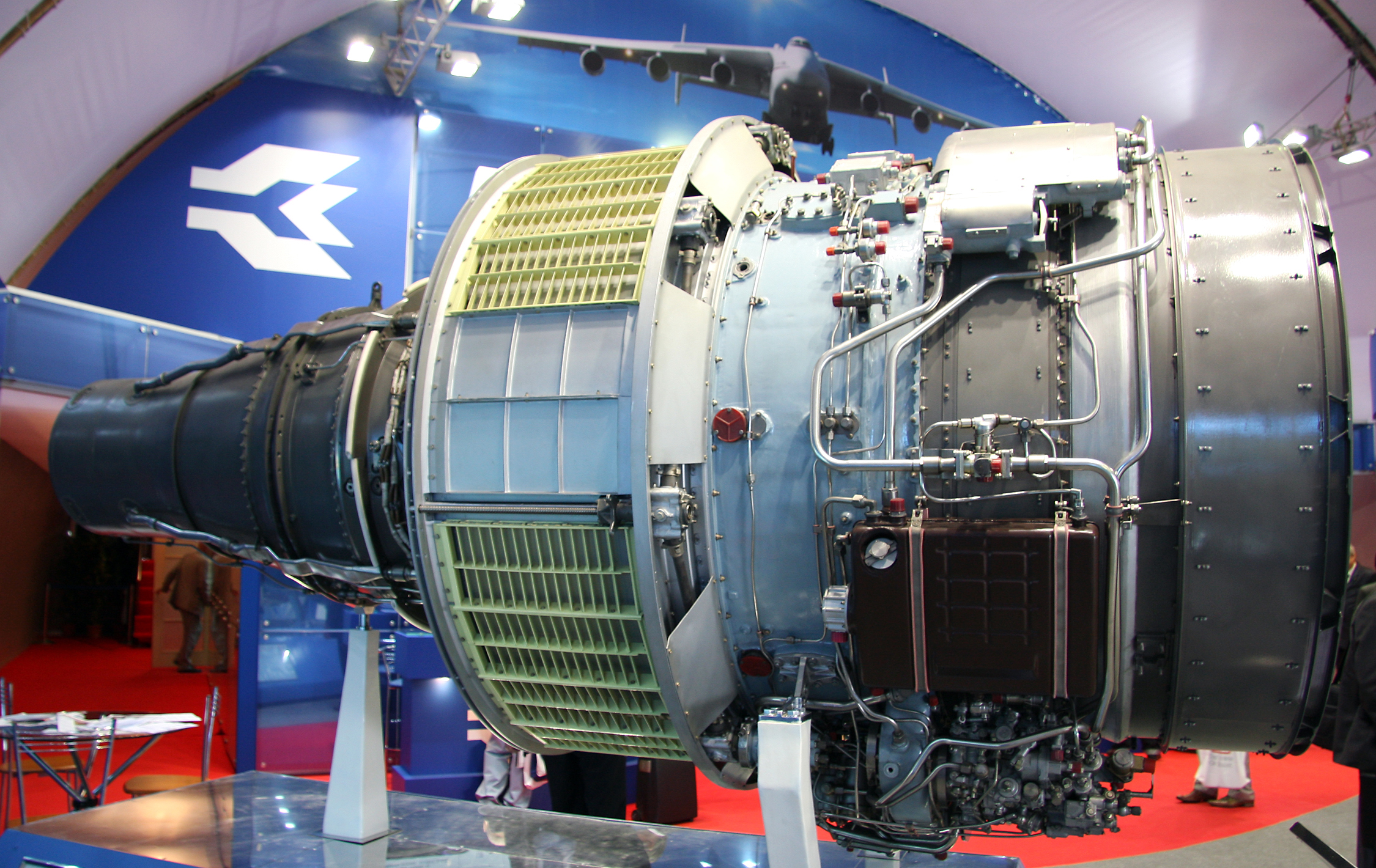
Three shaft Progress D-436

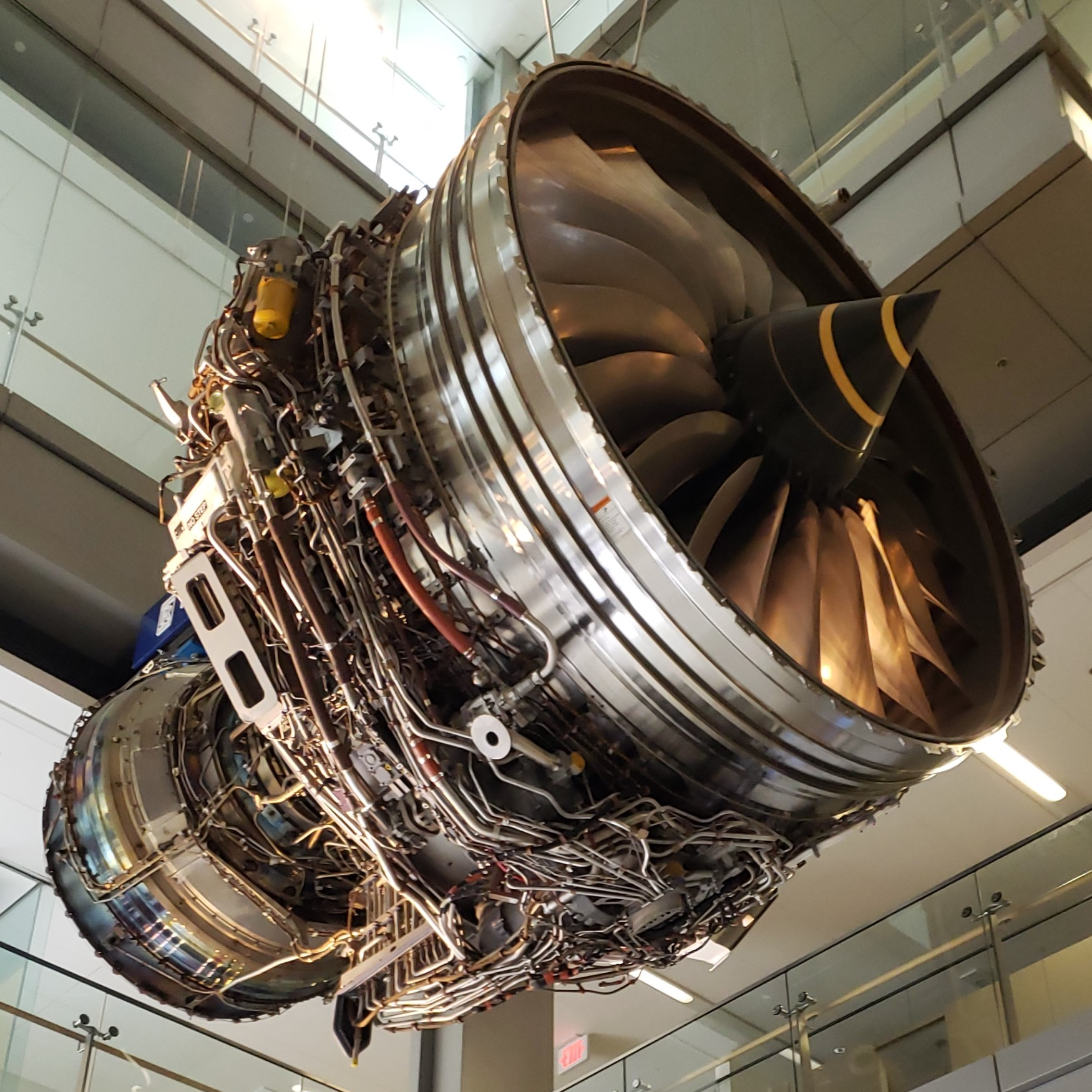
Trent 1000 powering the Boeing 787

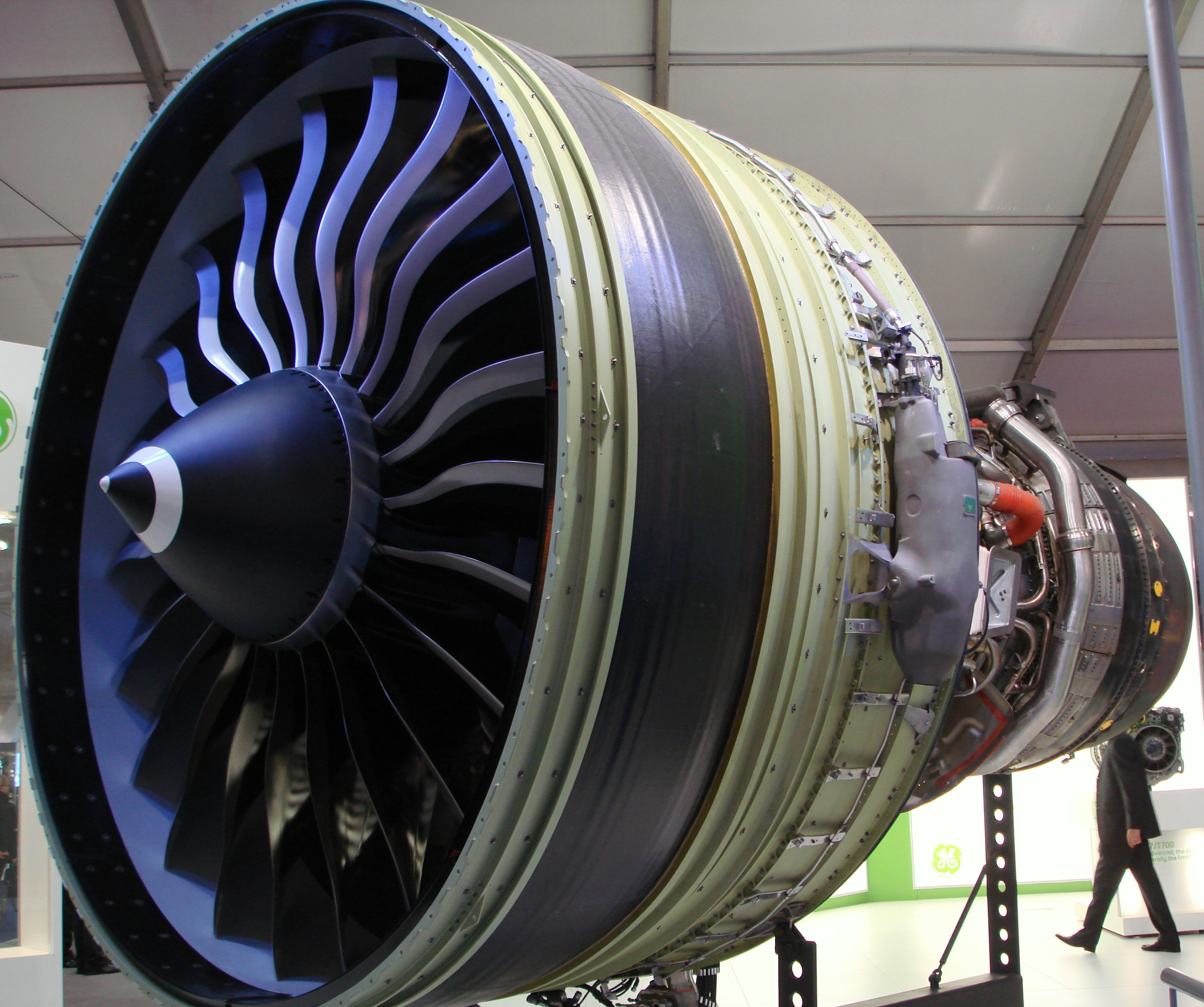
GE90 powering the Boeing 777, the most powerful aircraft engine

== Turbofan configurations ==
Turbofan engines come in a variety of engine configurations. For a given engine cycle (i.e., same airflow, bypass ratio, fan pressure ratio, overall pressure ratio and HP turbine rotor inlet temperature), the choice of turbofan configuration has little impact upon the design point performance (e.g., net thrust, SFC), as long as overall component performance is maintained. Off-design performance and stability is, however, affected by engine configuration.

The basic element of a turbofan is a spool, a fan or compressor and its driving turbine rotating on the same shaft. To reduce the time taken to reach take-off thrust from a lower engine speed, an important requirement in some emergency situations, two solutions were introduced on early turbojets:

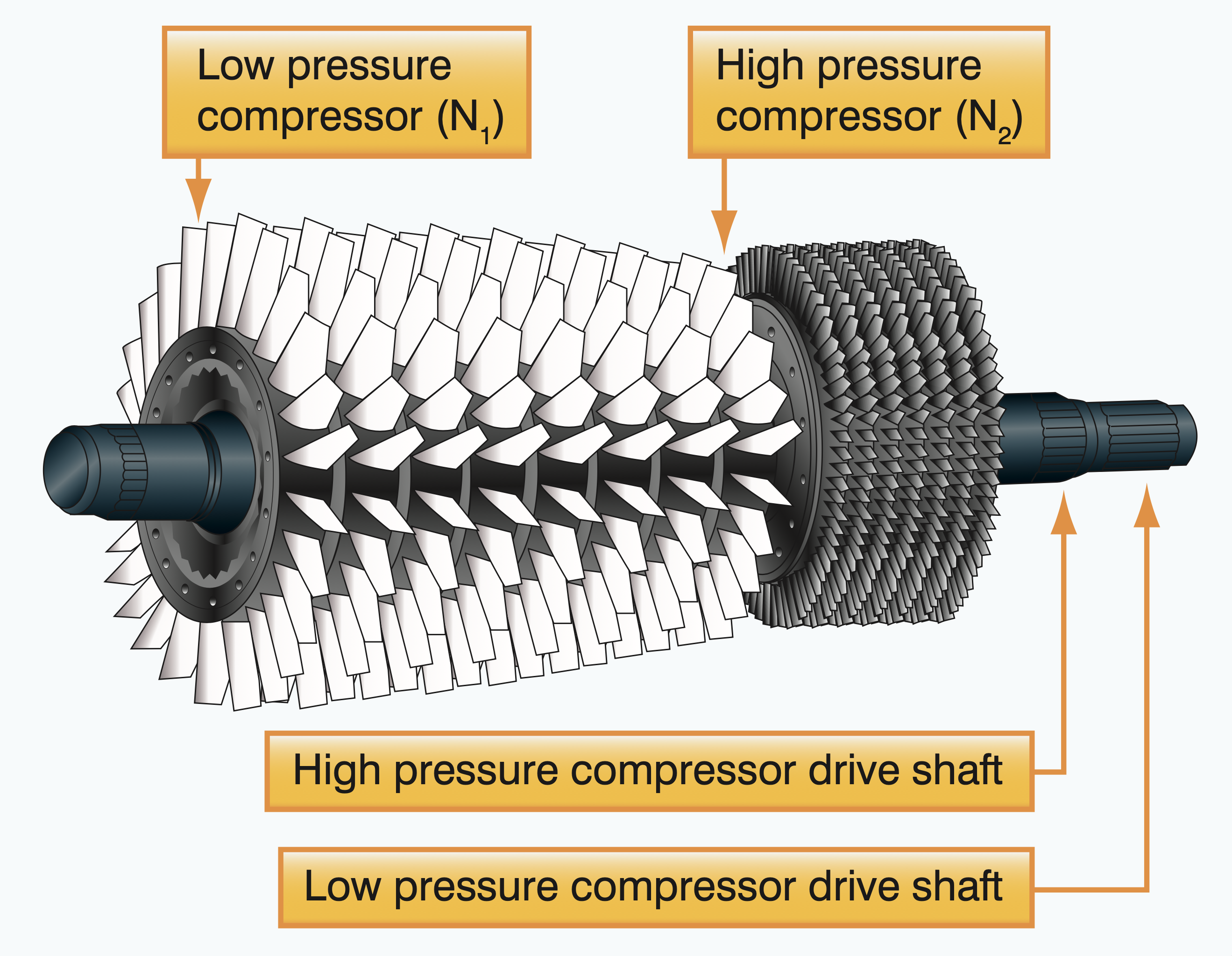
A dual-spool compressor showing the front slower-spinning compressor on the left, as used on the J57

1. Splitting the compressor into two parts, each with its own driving turbine, so they rotate at different speeds, as used on the Pratt & Whitney J57; or
2. Making some of the first rows of stator vanes with an adjustable stagger angle, as used on the J79.

Most modern western civil turbofans employ a relatively high-pressure-ratio high-pressure (HP) compressor, with many rows of variable stators to control surge margin at low rpm. In the three-spool RB211/Trent the core compression system is split into two, with the IP compressor, which supercharges the HP compressor, being on a different coaxial shaft and driven by a separate (IP) turbine. As the HP compressor has a modest pressure ratio its speed can be reduced surge-free, without employing variable geometry. However, because a shallow IP compressor working line is inevitable, the IPC has one stage of variable geometry on all variants except the −535, which has none.

=== Single-shaft turbofan ===
This classification, as originally applied to the Snecma M53, was subsequently changed for the M53 to single-shaft bypass turbojet, or continuous bleed turbojet. A similar classification for a 2-shaft engine with bypass, the General Electric YJ101, is augmented turbojet with continuous bypass bleed, also called a "leaky" turbojet.

=== Aft-fan turbofan ===
One of the earliest turbofans was a derivative of the General Electric J79 turbojet, known as the CJ805-23, which featured an integrated aft fan/low-pressure (LP) turbine unit located in the turbojet exhaust jetpipe. Hot gas from the turbojet turbine exhaust expanded through the LP turbine, the fan blades being a radial extension of the turbine blades. This arrangement introduces an additional gas leakage path compared to a front-fan configuration and was a problem with this engine with higher-pressure turbine gas leaking into the fan airflow. An aft-fan configuration was later used for the General Electric GE36 UDF (propfan) demonstrator of the early 1980s.

In 1971 a concept was put forward by the NASA Lewis Research Center for a supersonic transport engine which operated as an aft-fan turbofan at take-off and subsonic speeds and a turbojet at higher speeds. This would give the low-noise and high-thrust characteristics of a turbofan at take-off, together with turbofan high propulsive efficiency at subsonic flight speeds. It would have the high propulsive efficiency of a turbojet at supersonic cruise speeds.

=== Two-spool ===
Two-spool configurations are common, with the fan on the low pressure (LP) spool and the compressor on the high pressure (HP) spool; the LP spool runs more slowly to keep the tip speed of the larger-diameter fan within limits. The HP compressor receives compressed air from the inner part of the fan blades. The BR710 is typical of this configuration. At the lower thrust ratings, instead of all-axial blading, the HP compressor configuration may be axial-centrifugal (e.g., CFE CFE738), double-centrifugal or even diagonal/centrifugal (e.g. Pratt & Whitney Canada PW600).

=== Boosted two-spool ===
Higher overall pressure ratios can be achieved by either raising the HP compressor pressure ratio or adding compressor (non-bypass) stages to the LP spool, between the fan and the HP compressor, to boost the latter. All of the large American turbofans (e.g. General Electric CF6, GE90, GE9X and GEnx plus Pratt & Whitney JT9D and PW4000) use booster stages. The Rolls-Royce BR715 is another example. The high bypass ratios used in modern civil turbofans tend to reduce the relative diameter of the booster stages, reducing their mean tip speed. Consequently, more booster stages are required to develop the necessary pressure rise.

=== Three-spool ===
Rolls-Royce chose a three-spool configuration for their large civil turbofans (i.e. the RB211 and Trent families), where the booster stages of a boosted two-spool configuration are separated into an intermediate pressure (IP) spool, driven by its own turbine. The first three-spool engine was the earlier Rolls-Royce RB.203 Trent, of 1967.

The Garrett ATF3, powering the Dassault Falcon 20 business jet, has an unusual three-spool layout with an aft spool not concentric with the two others.

Ivchenko Design Bureau chose the same configuration as Rolls-Royce for their Lotarev D-36 engine, followed by Lotarev/Progress D-18T and Progress D-436.

The Turbo-Union RB199 military turbofan also has a three-spool configuration, as do the military Kuznetsov NK-25 and NK-321.

=== Geared fan ===
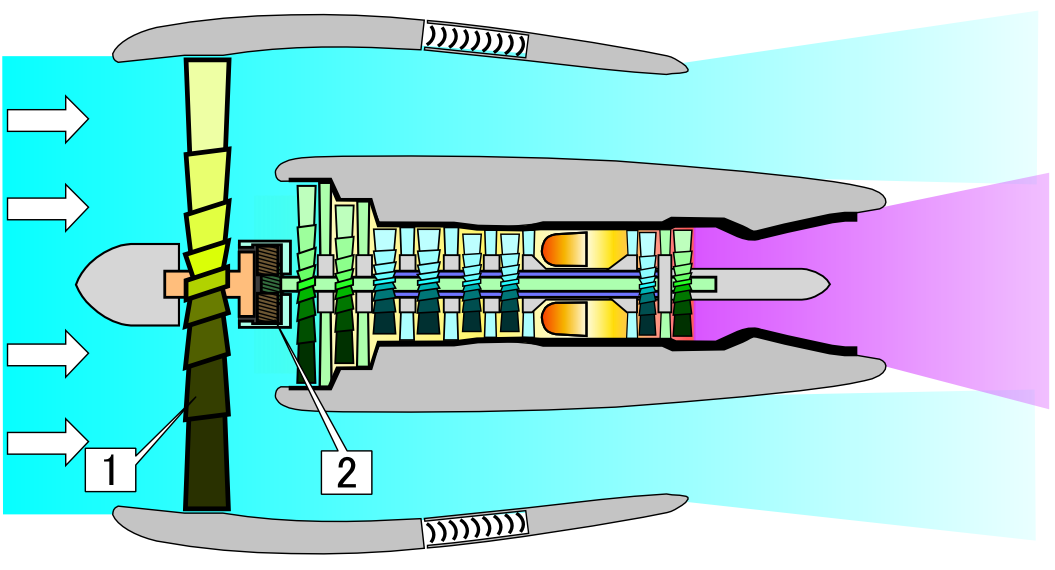
Geared turbofan. The gearbox is labeled 2.

As bypass ratio increases, the fan blade tip speed increases relative to the LPT blade speed. This will reduce the LPT blade speed, requiring more turbine stages to extract enough energy to drive the fan. Introducing a (planetary) reduction gearbox, with a suitable gear ratio, between the LP shaft and the fan enables both the fan and LP turbine to operate at their optimum speeds. Examples of this configuration are the long-established Garrett TFE731, the Honeywell ALF 502/507, and the recent Pratt & Whitney PW1000G.

=== Military turbofans ===
Most of the configurations discussed above are used in civilian turbofans, while modern military turbofans (e.g., Snecma M88) are usually basic two-spool.

=== High-pressure turbine ===
Most civil turbofans use a high-efficiency, two-stage HP turbine to drive the HP compressor. The CFM International CFM56 uses an alternative approach: a single-stage, high-work unit. While this approach is probably less efficient, there are savings on cooling air, weight and cost.

In the RB211 and Trent 3-spool engine series, the HP compressor pressure ratio is modest so only a single HP turbine stage is required. Modern military turbofans also tend to use a single HP turbine stage and a modest HP compressor.

=== Low-pressure turbine ===
Modern civil turbofans have multi-stage LP turbines (anywhere from three to seven). The number of stages required depends on the engine cycle bypass ratio and the boost (on boosted two-spools). A geared fan may reduce the number of required LPT stages in some applications. Because of the much lower bypass ratios employed, military turbofans require only one or two LP turbine stages.

== Improvements ==
=== Aerodynamic modelling ===
Aerodynamics is a mix of subsonic, transonic and supersonic airflow on a single fan/gas compressor blade in a modern turbofan. The airflow past the blades must be maintained within close angular limits to keep the air flowing against an increasing pressure. Otherwise air will be rejected back out of the intake.

The Full Authority Digital Engine Control (FADEC) needs accurate data for controlling the engine. The critical turbine inlet temperature (TIT) is too harsh an environment, at up to 1,090 °C (2,000 °F) and 17 bar (250 psi), for reliable sensors. Therefore, during development of a new engine type a relation is established between a more easily measured temperature like exhaust gas temperature and the TIT. Monitoring the exhaust gas temperature is then used to make sure the engine does not run too hot.

=== Blade technology ===
A turbine blade is subjected to 1,040–1,090 °C (1,900–2,000 °F), not far from the melting point of the alloys used. Exotic alloys, sophisticated air cooling schemes and special mechanical design are needed to keep the physical stresses within the strength of the material.

=== Fan blades ===
Fan blades have been growing as jet engines have been getting bigger: each fan blade carries the equivalent of nine double-decker buses and swallows air the equivalent volume of a squash court every second. Advances in computational fluid dynamics (CFD) modelling have permitted complex, 3D curved shapes with very wide chord, keeping the fan capabilities while minimizing the blade count to lower costs. Coincidentally, the bypass ratio grew to achieve higher propulsive efficiency and the fan diameter increased.

Rolls-Royce pioneered the hollow, titanium wide-chord fan blade in the 1980s for aerodynamic efficiency and foreign object damage resistance in the RB211 then for the Trent. GE Aviation introduced carbon fiber composite fan blades on the GE90 in 1995, manufactured since 2017 with a carbon-fiber tape-layer process. GE partner Safran developed a 3D woven technology with Albany Composites for the CFM56 and CFM LEAP engines.

=== Future progress ===
Engine cores are shrinking as they operate at higher pressure ratios and become more efficient and smaller compared to the fan as bypass ratios increase. Blade tip clearances are more difficult to maintain at the exit of the high-pressure compressor where blades are 0.5 in (13 mm) high or less; backbone bending further affects clearance control as the core is proportionately longer and thinner and the fan to low-pressure turbine driveshaft space is constrained within the core.

Pratt & Whitney VP technology and environment Alan Epstein argued "Over the history of commercial aviation, we have gone from 20% to 40% [cruise efficiency], and there is a consensus among the engine community that we can probably get to 60%".

Geared turbofans and further fan pressure ratio reductions may continue to improve propulsive efficiency. The second phase of the FAA's Continuous Lower Energy, Emissions and Noise (CLEEN) program is targeting for the late 2020s reductions of 33% fuel burn, 60% emissions and 32 dB EPNdb noise compared with the 2000s state-of-the-art. In summer 2017 at NASA Glenn Research Center in Cleveland, Ohio, Pratt has finished testing a very-low-pressure-ratio fan on a PW1000G, resembling an open rotor with fewer blades than the PW1000G's 20.

The weight and size of the nacelle would be reduced by a short duct inlet, imposing higher aerodynamic turning loads on the blades and leaving less space for soundproofing, but a lower-pressure-ratio fan is slower. UTC Aerospace Systems Aerostructures will have a full-scale ground test in 2019 of its low-drag Integrated Propulsion System with a thrust reverser, improving fuel burn by 1% and with 2.5-3 EPNdB lower noise.

Safran expects to deliver another 10–15% in fuel efficiency through the mid-2020s before reaching an asymptote, and next will have to increase the bypass ratio to 35:1 instead of 11:1 for the CFM LEAP. It is demonstrating a counterrotating open rotor unducted fan (propfan) in Istres, France, under the European Clean Sky technology program. Modeling advances and high specific strength materials may help it succeed where previous attempts failed. When noise levels are within existing standards and similar to the LEAP engine, 15% lower fuel burn will be available and for that Safran is testing its controls, vibration and operation, while airframe integration is still challenging.

For GE Aviation, the energy density of jet fuel still maximises the Breguet range equation and higher pressure ratio cores; lower pressure ratio fans, low-loss inlets and lighter structures can further improve thermal, transfer and propulsive efficiency. Under the U.S. Air Force's Adaptive Engine Transition Program, adaptive thermodynamic cycles will be used for the sixth-generation jet fighter, based on a modified Brayton cycle and Constant volume combustion. Additive manufacturing in the advanced turboprop will reduce weight by 5% and fuel burn by 20%.

Rotating and static ceramic matrix composite (CMC) parts operates 500 °F (260 °C) hotter than metal and are one-third its weight. With $21.9 million from the Air Force Research Laboratory, GE is investing $200 million in a CMC facility in Huntsville, Alabama, in addition to its Asheville, North Carolina site, mass-producing silicon carbide matrix with silicon-carbide fibers in 2018. CMCs will be used ten times more by the mid-2020s: the CFM LEAP requires 18 CMC turbine shrouds per engine and the GE9X will use it in the combustor and for 42 HP turbine nozzles.

Rolls-Royce Plc aim for a 60:1 pressure ratio core for the 2020s Ultrafan and began ground tests of its 100,000 hp (75,000 kW) gear for 100,000 lbf (440 kN) and 15:1 bypass ratios. Nearly stoichiometric turbine entry temperature approaches the theoretical limit and its impact on emissions has to be balanced with environmental performance goals. Open rotors, lower pressure ratio fans and potentially distributed propulsion offer more room for better propulsive efficiency. Exotic cycles, heat exchangers and pressure gain/constant volume combustion may improve thermodynamic efficiency. Additive manufacturing could be an enabler for intercooler and recuperators. Closer airframe integration and hybrid or electric aircraft can be combined with gas turbines.

Rolls-Royce engines have a 72–82% propulsive efficiency and 42–49% thermal efficiency for a 0.63–0.49 lb/lbf/h (64,000–50,000 g/kN/h) TSFC at Mach 0.8, and aim for theoretical limits of 95% for open rotor propulsive efficiency and 60% for thermal efficiency with stoichiometric turbine entry temperature and 80:1 overall pressure ratio for a 0.35 lb/lbf/h (36,000 g/kN/h) TSFC

As teething troubles may not show up until several thousand hours, the latest turbofans' technical problems disrupt airlines operations and manufacturers deliveries while production rates rise sharply. Trent 1000 cracked blades grounded almost 50 Boeing 787s and reduced ETOPS to 2.3 hours down from 5.5, costing Rolls-Royce plc almost $950 million. PW1000G knife-edge seal fractures have caused Pratt & Whitney to fall behind in deliveries, leaving about 100 engineless A320neos waiting for their powerplants. The CFM LEAP introduction had been smoother but a ceramic composite HP Turbine coating was prematurely lost, necessitating a new design, causing 60 A320neo engine removals for modification and delaying deliveries by up to six weeks late.

On a widebody, Safran estimates 5–10% of fuel could be saved by reducing power intake for hydraulic systems, while swapping to electrical power could save 30% of weight, as initiated on the Boeing 787, while Rolls-Royce plc hopes for up to 5%.

== Manufacturers ==
The turbofan engine market is dominated by General Electric, Rolls-Royce plc and Pratt & Whitney, in order of market share. General Electric and Safran of France have a joint venture, CFM International. Pratt & Whitney also have a joint venture, International Aero Engines with Japanese Aero Engine Corporation and MTU Aero Engines of Germany, specializing in engines for the Airbus A320 family. Pratt & Whitney and General Electric have a joint venture, Engine Alliance selling a range of engines for aircraft such as the Airbus A380.

For airliners and cargo aircraft, the in-service fleet in 2016 is 60,000 engines and should grow to 103,000 in 2035 with 86,500 deliveries according to Flight Global. A majority will be medium-thrust engines for narrow-body aircraft with 54,000 deliveries, for a fleet growing from 28,500 to 61,000. High-thrust engines for wide-body aircraft, worth 40–45% of the market by value, will grow from 12,700 engines to over 21,000 with 18,500 deliveries. The regional jet engines below 20,000 lb (89 kN) fleet will grow from 7,500 to 9,000 and the fleet of turboprops for airliners will increase from 9,400 to 10,200. The manufacturers market share should be led by CFM with 44% followed by Pratt & Whitney with 29% and then Rolls-Royce and General Electric with 10% each.

=== Commercial turbofans in production ===
Commercial turbofans in production
Model	Start	Bypass	Length	Fan	Weight	Thrust	Thrust/Weight ratio	Major applications
GE CF6	1971	4.3–5.3	4.00–4.41 m	2.20–2.79 m	3.82–5.08 t	222–298 kN	4.45–7.94	A300/A310, A330, B747, B767, MD-11, DC-10
GE CF34	1982	5.3–6.3	2.62–3.26 m	1.25–1.32 m	0.74–1.12 t	41–82.3 kN	3.74–11.34	Challenger 600, CRJ, E-jets
GE GE90	1992	8.7–9.9	5.18–5.40 m	3.12–3.25 m	7.56–8.62 t	330–510 kN	3.95–6.84	B777
GE GEnx	2006	8.0–9.3	4.31–4.69 m	2.66–2.82 m	5.62–5.82 t	296–339 kN	5.19–6.16	B747-8, B787
GE Passport	2013	5.6	3.37 m	1.30 m	2.07 t	78.9–84.2 kN	3.86–4.13	Global 7000/8000
GE Honda HF120	2009	2.9	1.51 m	0.66 m	0.211 t	9.1 kN	4.41	HA-420
GE-H HF120	2009	4.43	1.12 m	0.54 m	0.18 t	7.4 kN	4.20	HondaJet
P&W PW4000	1984	4.8–6.4	3.37–4.95 m	2.84 m	4.18–7.48 t	222–436 kN	3.04–10.60	A300/A310, A330, B747, B767, B777, MD-11
P&W PW6000	2000	4.90	2.73 m	1.44 m	2.36 t	100.2 kN	4.32	Airbus A318
P&W PW1000G	2008	9.0–12.5	3.40 m	1.42–2.06 m	2.86 t	67–160 kN	2.38–5.70	A320neo, CSeries, E-Jets E2
P&WC PW300	1988	3.8–4.5	1.92–2.07 m	0.97 m	0.45–0.47 t	23.4–35.6 kN	5.05–8.09	Cit. Sovereign, G200, F. 7X, F. 2000
P&WC PW500	1993	3.90	1.52 m	0.70 m	0.28 t	13.3 kN	4.85	Citation Excel, Phenom 300
P&WC PW600	2001	1.8–2.8	0.67 m	0.36 m	0.15 t	6.0 kN	4.08	Cit. Mustang, Eclipse 500, Phenom 100
P&WC PW800	2012	5.5	1.30 m	1.30 m	1.4 t	67.4–69.7 kN	4.91-5.07	Gulfstream G500/G600, Falcon 6X
R-R BR700	1994	4.2–4.5	3.41–3.60 m	1.32–1.58 m	1.63–2.11 t	68.9–102.3 kN	3.31–6.40	B717, Global Express, Gulfstream V
R-R Trent 500	1999	8.5	3.91 m	2.47 m	4.72 t	252 kN	5.44	A340-500/600
R-R Trent 700	1990	4.9	3.91 m	2.47 m	4.79 t	320 kN	6.83	A330
R-R Trent 800	1993	5.7–5.79	4.37 m	2.79 m	5.96–5.98 t	411–425 kN	7.02–7.27	B777
R-R Trent 900	2004	8.7	4.55 m	2.95 m	6.18–6.25 t	340–357 kN	5.56–5.87	A380
R-R Trent 1000	2006	10.8–11	4.74 m	2.85 m	5.77 t	265.3–360.4 kN	4.69–6.36	B787
R-R Trent XWB	2010	9.3	5.22 m	3.00 m	7.28 t	330–430 kN	4.63–6.02	A350XWB
R-R Tay	1984	3.1–3.2	2.41 m	1.12–1.14 m	1.42–1.53 t	61.6–68.5 kN	4.13–4.92	Gulfstream IV, Fokker 70/100
R-R AE 3007	1991	5.0	2.71 m	1.11 m	0.72 t	33.7 kN	4.77	ERJ, Citation X
CFM56	1974	5.0–6.6	2.36–2.52 m	1.52–1.84 m	1.95–2.64 t	97.9–151 kN	3.82–7.91	A320, A340-200/300, B737, KC-135, DC-8
CFM LEAP	2013	9.0–11.0	3.15–3.33 m	1.76–1.98 m	2.78–3.15 t	100–146 kN	3.26–5.33	A320neo, B737 Max, Comac C919
IAE V2500	1987	4.4–4.9	3.20 m	1.60 m	2.36–2.54 t	97.9–147 kN	4.32	A320, MD-90
EA GP7000	2004	8.7	4.75 m	2.95 m	6.09–6.71 t	311–363 kN	4.70–6.07	A380
HW TFE731	1970	2.66–3.9	1.52–2.08 m	0.72–0.78 m	0.34–0.45 t	15.6–22.2 kN	3.61–6.65	Learjet 70/75, G150, Falcon 900
HW HTF7000	1999	4.4	2.29 m	0.87 m	0.62 t	28.9 kN	4.74	Challenger 300, G280, Legacy 500
Williams FJ44	1985	3.3–4.1	1.36–2.09 m	0.53–0.57 m	0.21–0.24 t	6.7–15.6 kN	3.21–7.60	CitationJet, Cit. M2, HA-480 Echelon
Williams FJ33	1998	—	0.98 m	0.53 m	0.14 t	6.7 kN	4.88	Cirrus SF50
Silvercrest	2012	5.9	1.90 m	1.08 m	1.09 t	50.9 kN	4.76	Cit. Hemisphere, Falcon 5X
PS-90	1992	4.4	4.96 m	1.9 m	2.95 t	157–171 kN	5.42–5.89	Ilyushin Il-76, Ilyushin Il-96, Tupolev Tu-204
PowerJet SaM146	2008	4–4.1	3.59 m	1.22 m	2.26 t	71.6–79.2 kN	3.23–3.57	Sukhoi Superjet 100

== Extreme bypass jet engines ==
In the 1970s, Rolls-Royce/SNECMA tested a M45SD-02 turbofan fitted with variable-pitch fan blades to improve handling at ultralow fan pressure ratios and to provide thrust reverse down to zero aircraft speed. The engine was aimed at ultraquiet STOL aircraft operating from city-centre airports.

In a bid for increased efficiency with speed, a development of the turbofan and turboprop known as a propfan engine was created that had an unducted fan. The fan blades are situated outside of the duct, so that it appears like a turboprop with wide scimitar-like blades. Both General Electric and Pratt & Whitney/Allison demonstrated propfan engines in the 1980s. Excessive cabin noise and relatively cheap jet fuel prevented the engines being put into service. The Progress D-27 propfan, developed in the Soviet Union, was the only propfan engine equipped on a production aircraft.

== Terminology ==
Afterburner
jetpipe equipped for afterburning
Augmentor
afterburner for turbofan with burning in hot and cold flows
Bypass
that part of the engine as distinct from the core in terms of components and airflow, e.g. that part of fan blading (fan outer) and stators which pass bypass air, bypass duct, bypass nozzle
Bypass ratio
bypass air mass flow /core air mass flow
Core
that part of the engine as distinct from the bypass in terms of components and airflow, e.g. core cowl, core nozzle, core airflow and associated machinery, combustor and fuel system
Core power
also known as "available energy" or "gas horsepower". It is used to measure the theoretical (isentropic expansion) shaft work available from a gas generator or core by expanding hot, high pressure gas to ambient pressure. Since the power depends on the pressure and temperature of the gas (and the ambient pressure) a related figure of merit for thrust-producing engines is one which measures the thrust-producing potential from hot, high pressure gas and known as "stream thrust". It is obtained by calculating the velocity obtained with isentropic expansion to atmospheric pressure. The significance of the thrust obtained appears when multiplied by the aircraft velocity to give the thrust work. The thrust work which is potentially available is far less than the gas horsepower due to the increasing waste in the exhaust kinetic energy with increasing pressure and temperature before expansion to atmospheric pressure. The two are related by the propulsive efficiency, a measure of the energy wasted as a result of producing a force (i.e. thrust) in a fluid by increasing the speed (i.e. momentum) of the fluid.
Dry
engine ratings/ throttle lever positions below afterburning selection
EGT
exhaust gas temperature
EPR
engine pressure ratio
Fan
turbofan LP compressor
Fanjet
turbofan or aircraft powered by turbofan (colloquial)
Fan pressure ratio
fan outlet total pressure divided by fan inlet total pressure.
Flex temp
At reduced take-off weights commercial aircraft can use reduced thrust which increases engine life and reduces maintenance costs. Flex temperature is a higher than actual outside air temperature (OAT) which is input to the engine monitoring computer to achieve the required reduced thrust (also known as "assumed temperature thrust reduction").
Gas generator
that part of the engine core which provides the hot, high pressure gas for fan-driving turbines (turbofan), for propelling nozzles (turbojet), for propeller- and rotor-driving turbines (turboprop and turboshaft), for industrial and marine power turbines
HP
high-pressure
Intake ram drag
Loss in momentum of engine stream tube from freestream to intake entrance, i.e. amount of energy imparted to air required to accelerate air from a stationary atmosphere to aircraft speed.
IEPR
integrated engine pressure ratio
IP
intermediate pressure
LP
low-pressure
Net thrust
nozzle thrust in stationary air (gross thrust) – engine stream tube ram drag (loss in momentum from freestream to intake entrance, i.e. amount of energy imparted to air required to accelerate air from a stationary atmosphere to aircraft speed). This is the thrust acting on the airframe.
Overall pressure ratio
amount of times the pressure increases due to ram compression and work done by the compressor stages
Overall efficiency
thermal efficiency × propulsive efficiency
Propulsive efficiency
propulsive power/rate of production of propulsive kinetic energy (maximum propulsive efficiency occurs when jet velocity equals flight velocity, which implies zero net thrust!)
Specific fuel consumption (SFC)
total fuel flow divided by net thrust (proportional to flight velocity divided by overall thermal efficiency)
Spooling up
increase in RPM (colloquial)
Spooling down
decrease in RPM (colloquial)
Stage loading
For a turbine, the purpose of which is to produce power, the loading is an indicator of power developed per lb/sec of gas (specific power). A turbine stage turns the gas from an axial direction and speeds it up (in the nozzle guide vanes) to turn the rotor most effectively (rotor blades must produce high lift), the proviso being that this is done efficiently, i.e. with acceptable losses. For a compressor stage, the purpose of which is to produce a pressure rise, a diffusion process is used. How much diffusion may be allowed (and pressure rise obtained) before unacceptable flow separation occurs (i.e. losses) may be regarded as a loading limit.
Stagnation pressure
also known as total pressure; pressure of the fluid if all the kinetic energy were to be converted into pressure isentropically; sum of static pressure and dynamic pressure
Static pressure
pressure of the fluid which is associated not with its motion but with its state or, alternatively, pressure due to the random motion of the fluid molecules that would be felt or measured if moving with the flow
Specific thrust
net thrust/intake airflow
Thermal efficiency
rate of production of propulsive kinetic energy/fuel power
Total fuel flow
combustor (plus any afterburner) fuel flow rate (e.g., lb/s or g/s)
Total pressure
also known as stagnation pressure; sum of static pressure and dynamic pressure; pressure of the fluid if all the kinetic energy were to be converted into pressure isentropically
Turbine rotor inlet temperature
maximum cycle temperature, i.e. temperature at which work transfer takes place

== See also ==
- Axial fan design
- Gas turbine
- Turbine engine failure
- Variable cycle engine
- Motorjet
