= Alexander Moritz Frey =

German writer

Alexander Moritz Frey (1881–1957) was a German author known for his speculative fiction books and for his satirical columns in the press. His breakthrough was the novel Solneman der Unsichtbare, published in 1914.

Frey, a pacifist, served as a medic in the same regiment as Adolf Hitler during World War I. According to Frey in an essay called "The Unknown Private—Personal Memories of Hitler", which was not discovered until decades after his death, Hitler adopted his famous style of moustache after being ordered to have his original full one trimmed since it caused problems in getting his gas mask on.

Frey was featured in an exhibition in Berlin in 2011 that was dedicated to writers whose books had been burned at an event organised by the German Student Union on 10 May 1933 during which Joseph Goebbels gave a speech to praise the burning as "a breakthrough in the German revolution".
