= Delphin-Verlag =

German publishing house

- Status: defunct
- Founded: 1911
- Founder: Richard Landauer
- Country of origin: Germany
- Headquarters location: Munich; Landshut
- Publication types: Books
- Nonfiction topics: Modern art and literature
- Imprints: Kleine Delphin-Kunstbücher

Delphin-Verlag was a German publishing house founded in Munich in 1911 by Richard Landauer (1882–1960). It focused on modern art and literature, and in the 1920s also on German folklore and folk arts. By the 1930s the Delphin-Verlag's output had slowed, and it published nothing in 1932–33. In late 1933 Landauer moved operations to Landshut. In 1937, the Reich Chamber of Literature removed Delphin-Verlag from the German Trade Register as a Jewish publisher, and in 1938 Landauer fled to London. Delphin-Verlag was forced to close in 1945.

An unrelated publisher of children's books and nonfiction named Delphin Verlag was founded in Cologne in 1963.
