= Multiple lining tool =

Chisel with multiple blades

The multiple lining tool is a burin chisel used in engraving with multiple cutting blades for making parallel lines to create a hatching effect.

The multiple lining tool is also called the multiple tool, lining tool, multiliner, liner, shooter, multiple graver, comb, and half-tone comb.

== Description ==
The multiple lining tool allows the engraver to create hatched shading effects by engraving multiple parallel lines at the same time. It achieves this by having two or more cutting blades, which are available in different grades or sizes, such as the density of lines. The resulting hatching has a mechanical look.
