= SWS =

SWS, SWs, or sWS may refer to:

== Education ==
- Sacramento Waldorf School, Pre-K-12 coeducational private school in Sacramento, California
- School within a School, a democratic education program at Brookline High School

== Machines ==
- M21 Sniper Weapon System, a US Army sniper rifle
- M24 Sniper Weapon System, a US Army sniper rifle
- Schwere Wehrmachtschlepper German half-track vehicle deployed late into World War II
- SWS (trolleybus), a hybrid trolleybus prototype

== Technology ==
- Scientific Workflow System, scientific application software that composes, executes, and manages workflows
- Seawater scale, a measure of concentration of H^{+}, HSO_{4}^{+}, and HF
- Semantic Web service, a Web service that can be published, discovered, composed, and executed by Web applications
- Sentient World Simulation, a project to be based on Synthetic Environment for Analysis and Simulations
- Silly window syndrome, a TCP flow control problem in computer networks
- Sine wave speech, a speech synthesis technique that replaces formants with pure tone whistles
- Smart wearable system, an extension of the wearable computer

== Places ==
- South West State, federal member state of Somalia established 1 April 2002

== Other uses ==
- Sleeping with Sirens, an American rock band
- Safe Water System, initiative by the US Centers for Disease Control and Prevention to improve water quality
- Schweizerische Wagons- und Aufzügefabrik AG Schlieren-Zürich, a now defunct Swiss railway rolling stock manufacturer
- Seann William Scott (b. 1976), US actor
- Shaun White Snowboarding, a 2008 video game
- Slow-wave sleep, deep sleep
- Social Weather Stations, a social research institution in the Philippines
- Society of Wetland Scientists, a US non-profit organization
- Solid Wood Soldiers, a neo-Nazi prison gang
- Southern Water Services, a private utility company responsible for public wastewater collection and treatment in South England
- SouthWest Service, a Metra route to Manhattan, Illinois
- Sozialwerke Pfarrer Sieber, a Swiss charity and relief organization founded by Pastor Ernst Sieber
- Super World of Sports, a Japanese professional wrestling promotion
- SWS, IATA airport code for Swansea Airport
- SWs, listener missives that express appreciation for Sarah Kennedy's breakfast show on BBC Radio 2
- An abbreviation for sallallahu 'alayhi wa sallam, the benediction for the Islamic prophet Muhammad (meaning Peace be upon him)
