= Sisu RA-140 DS =

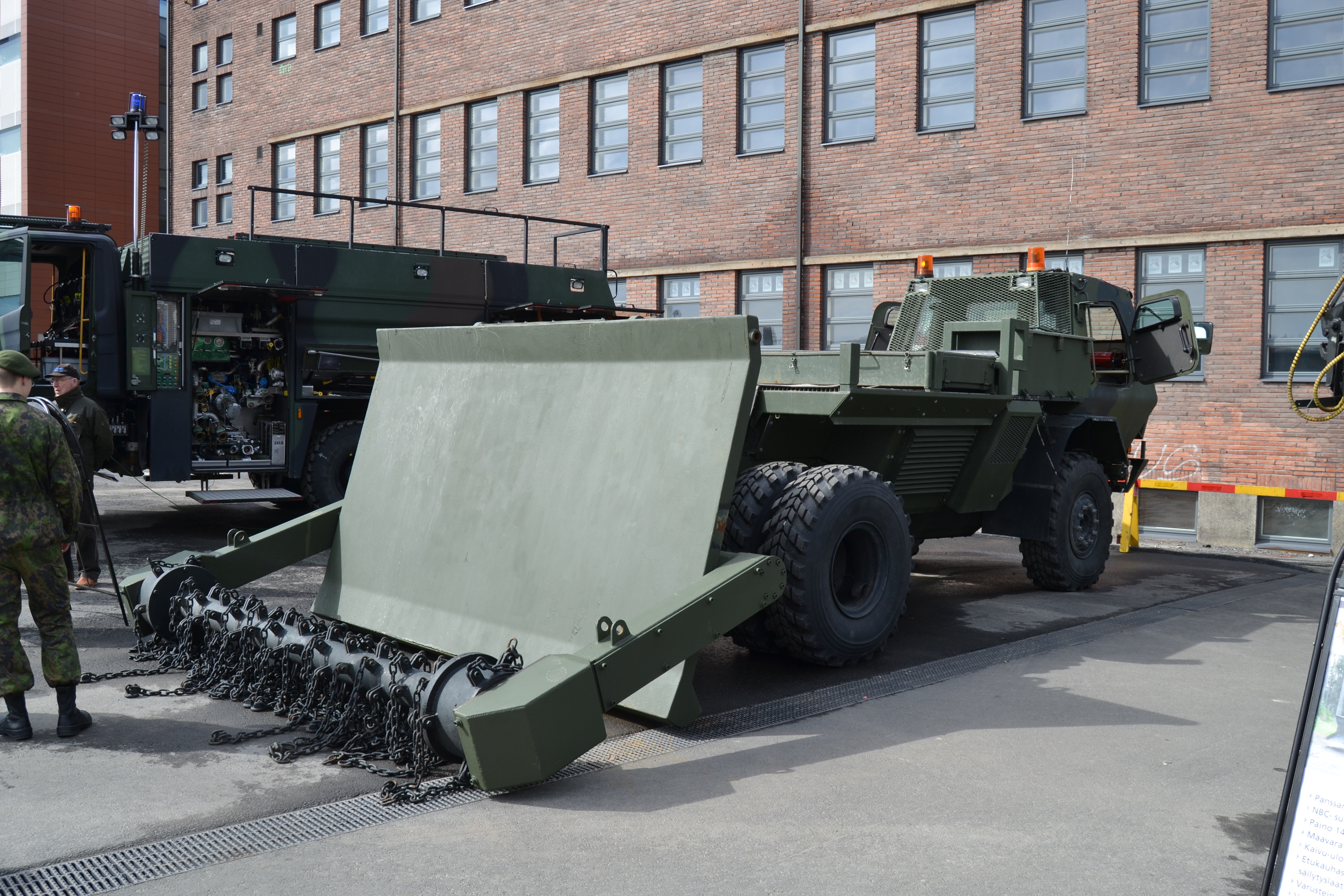
- Type: Demining vehicle
- Place of origin: Hämeenlinna, Finland

Service history
- In service: 1994
- Used by: Danish Defence; Finnish Defence Forces

Production history
- Designed: 1990
- Manufacturer: Oy Sisu-Auto Ab; Patria Vehicles Oy
- Produced: 1994–2001
- No. built: 41 pieces

Specifications
- Mass: 15,000 kilograms (33,000 lb)
- Length: 7,330 millimetres (289 in)
- Width: 2,920 millimetres (115 in)
- Height: 2,860 millimetres (113 in)
- Crew: 1+1
- Armour: Cabin protected against 7.62 mm bullets and shell splinters
- Engine: Deutz BF 6L 913 C turbodiesel 189 hp at 2,500 rpm
- Transmission: 4-speed automatic Renk Doromat 874 AM/PTO
- Fuel capacity: 150 litres
- Operational range: 250 km
- Maximum speed: On road: 70 km/h; in action: 6 km/h

The Sisu RA-140 DS "Raisu" is a flail-type demining vehicle developed and produced by the Finnish company Sisu-Auto and later produced by Patria Vehicles in the years 1994–2001. The production totalled 41 units.

== Development ==
Design work on a new demining vehicle began in 1986 and the first prototype was ready in 1990. The basic structure was borrowed from the SA-110 prototype but with extensive modification to suit the new vehicle's purpose. Technology and design assets of Pasi were utilised in the development of the armoured cabin.

Sisu military vehicles typically have a nickname in addition to the official model name. The vehicle was nearly given the nickname Misu which means "kitty" or "pussycat". It was derived from Miina-Sisu ("Mine Sisu"), and it was already printed on some brochures. However, the engineering department quickly changed the name to Raisu, from Raivaus-Sisu ("Clearance Sisu"), as 'Misu' was considered infantile. Raisu also means "boisterous".

== Production ==
Production of the RA-140 DS took place in Hämeenlinna and it was the last Sisu design to be developed there. Four vehicles were produced for Danish Defence in the years 1996–1997; the rest were assigned to different brigades of Finnish Defence Forces.

== Operation and characteristics ==
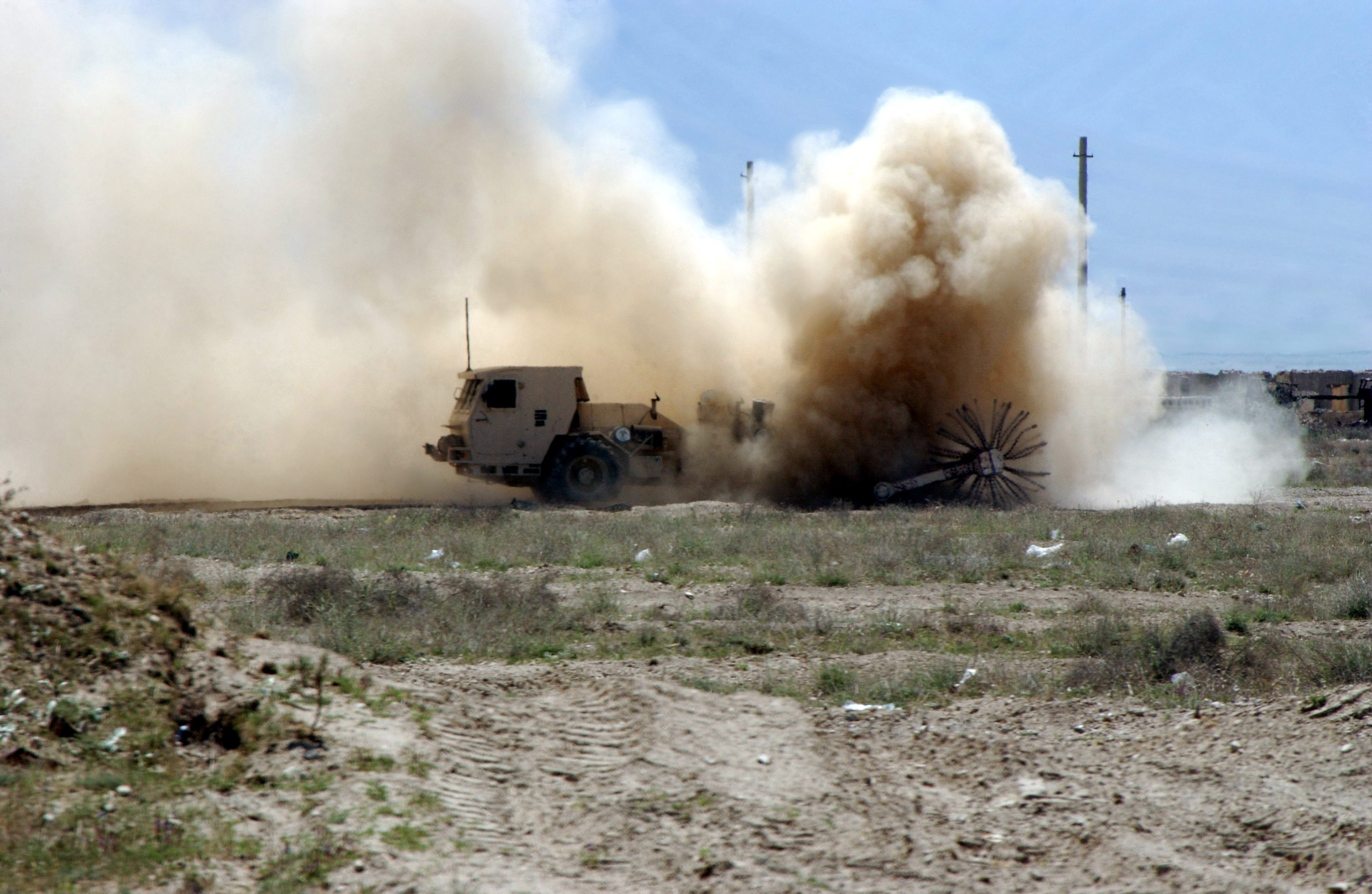
An RA-140 DS in use at Bagram Airfield. 2004

The RA-140 DS is intended for clearing of minefields composed of surface-placed or conventionally buried non-directional mines set against infantry, and sparsely placed anti-tank mines up to 10 kg. It can clear a suitable passage for a vehicle convoy. Raisu is not meant for combat missions.

The mine clearing tool includes 82 hammers which are fastened to a rotating flail by chains. In operation the vehicle is driven in reverse to ensure the best protection for the crew. The driver and passenger are protected against the pressure and mine fragments by a protection shield next to the flail. The vehicle makes a 3.4-metre wide path and the clearing depth can be controlled manually or automatically. The maximum speed in operation is 6 km/h and the Raisu can eliminate mines up to 10 kg of explosive. The clearing flail is turned longitudinally and mounted on the top of the vehicle for during transportation.

The maximum gradient that the vehicle can navigate is 60% and the steepest side slope 30%. The highest vertical step the vehicle can climb is 0.5 metres and the trenching capability is 0.6 metres. The maximum fording depth is 0.8 metres. The Raisu's cross-country mobility is good and it can be quickly moved to a new site. This is a key benefit compared to conventional, heavier tank-based applications.

== Technical data ==
The vehicle is powered by air-cooled six-cylinder Deutz BF 6L 913 C turbodiesel engine. The gearbox is a four-speed automatic Renk Doromat 874 AM/PTO. The front axle is portal type and sprung with coil springs. Both axles are driven and equipped with lockable differentials. The front axle has got disc brakes and the rear axle is with drum brakes.

When in service, the vehicle is driven by hydraulic transmission which is also using the flail and lifting or lowering an armoured-steel-made deflector shield between the flail and vehicle. The flail rotating speed can be infinitely adjusted between 0–500 rpm. The armoured cabin contains seats for the driver and commander and is designed with NBC protection and to withstand a 10 kg explosion under the vehicle. The armour protects against 7.62 calibre bullets. A 2061 VHF radio is for communication. The wheels are mine and bullet resistant. There is an option to mount a 12.7-calibre machine gun. A self-recovery winch is fitted as standard.

== Operational history ==
The four vehicles of Danish Defence were used in the former Yugoslavia. The vehicles faced severe problems in Bosnia and therefore the Danish army placed their further mine clearing vehicle orders for domestic made Hydrema 910 MCV.

Finland has used Raisu's in UN missions.
