= Sisu Auto =

Finnish truck manufacturer

Oy Sisu Auto Ab
- Type: Osakeyhtiö
- Industry: Automotive
- Predecessor: Autoteollisuus-Bilindustri and Autokoritehdas
- Founded: 1 April 1931; 95 years ago in Helsinki, Finland
- Founder: Karl Arthur Nordgrén; Emil Anton Winckelmann; Lars Wilhelm Åberg
- Headquarters: Raseborg, Finland
- Key people: Timo Korhonen (owner and CEO)
- Products: On- and off-road trucks; military trucks
- Services: Heavy vehicle application engineering
- Revenue: ▼€9,210,000 (2023); €14,494,000 (2022)
- Operating income: ▼ -€3,051,000 (2023); -€2,312,000 (2022)
- Owner: Timo Korhonen
- Number of employees: ▼60 (2023); 65 (2022)
- Subsidiaries: Sisu Auto Trucks Oy; Sisu Defence Oy; Sisu Engineering Oy
- Website: sisuauto.com

Oy Sisu Auto Ab is a truck manufacturer based in Raseborg, Finland. Its name comes from the Finnish word sisu meaning guts, grit and determination.

Sisu Auto has a subsidiary company, Sisu Defence, producing high mobility tactical vehicles for military use.

== Production ==
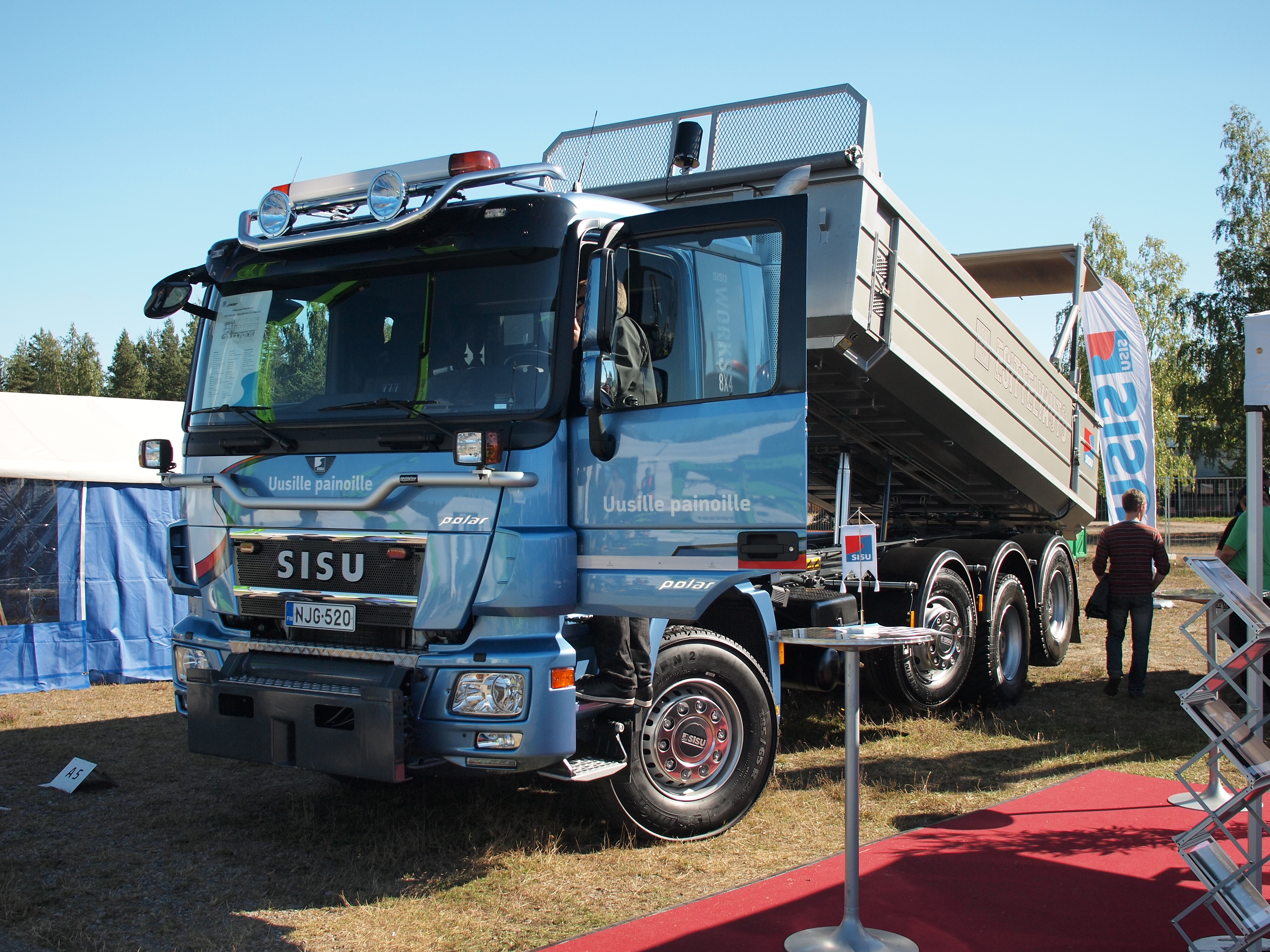
2013 Sisu Polar Works road maintenance truck

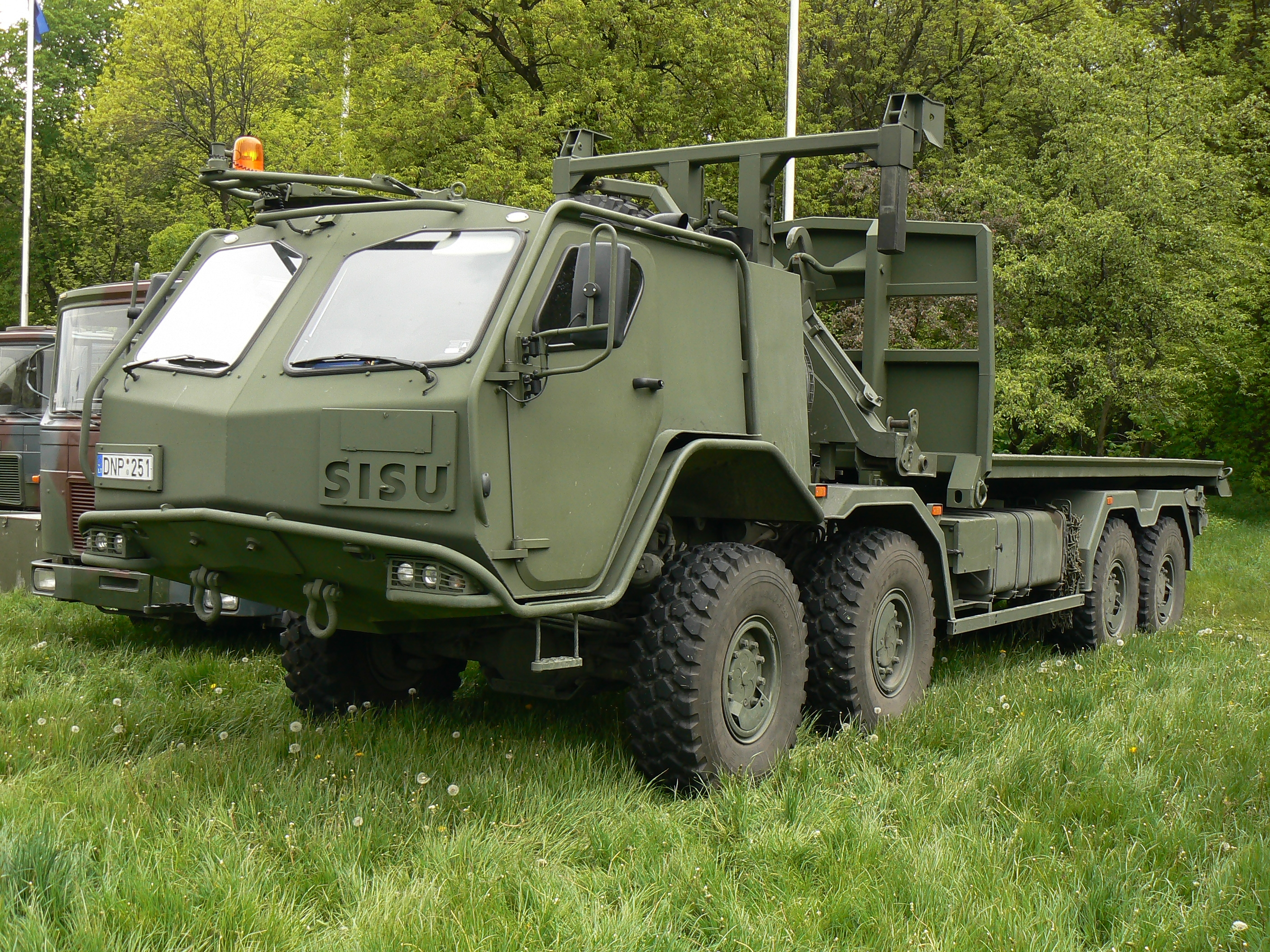
Sisu E13TP 8×8 military truck of the Lithuanian Armed Forces

=== Civil trucks ===
The currently available Sisu Polar variants are with three, four or five axles in various layouts. The applications are:

- Sisu Crane – crane trucks
- Sisu Rock – dump trucks
- Sisu Roll – hook loader
- Sisu Timber – timber trucks
- Sisu Works – road maintenance trucks
- Sisu Carrier – heavy machinery carrier

=== Military trucks ===
- Sisu 4×4
- Sisu 6×6
- Sisu 8×8
- Sisu 10×10

== History ==
=== 1931 to 1939 ===
The company was established on 1 April 1931 as Oy Suomen Autoteollisuus Ab (SAT). It originated from two neighbouring Helsinki-based automobile coach builders, Autokoritehdas and Autoteollisuus-Bilindustri, both of which had fallen into financial troubles by the beginning of the 1930s. The banks, which were funding both companies, pressed them to put together their operations under one company. The founders were Emil Anton Winckelmann, Lars Wilhelm Åberg and Karl Arthur Nordgren. In the first company meeting the company general manager was selected John Hellsten and the technical manager was appointed Tor Nessling.

At first SAT continued the coachbuilding business which it had inherited from its predecessors, but also put into practice the plan of building own vehicles, which was evolved already earlier, when Autoteollisuus-Bilindustri had ordered few Volvo chassis for outfitting. These chassis formed the basis for the first pre-series of vehicles.

As soon as the business started, SAT started to seek a good brand for its products. In the early summer of 1932 the company set up a name competition which was advertised in the main newspapers of Helsinki. The competition got a lot of attention and some 3000–4000 suggestions were received. The jury met in Hotel Kämp in Helsinki to select the winner in the middle of June 1932. Three candidates were selected: Sisu ("guts; stamina; stubbornness, determination"), Karhu ("bear") and Haukka ("hawk"). Eventually, Sisu became selected. As many people had suggested the successful name, the winner of the 1,000-mark prize was selected by lottery – he was young Veikko Arohonka, actually signed up by his older brother Eino, who later became a writer.

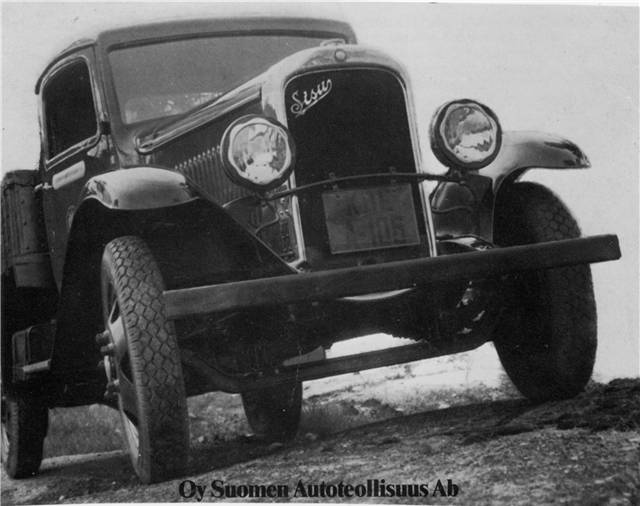
S-321 from 1932

The first nine Sisus, models S-321 and S-323, were handed over to the customers in 1932. Six of them were lorries and one was a bus. The first production series, based heavily on Volvo components, were made in 1933.

Beginning of domestic vehicle production led to an odd episode – the Finnish government became concerned about losing toll incomes because of the locally built vehicles. In 1933 Dr. Juho Jännes was assigned to investigate the financial impact of domestically produced automobiles. The outcome was that if 500 of the vehicles annually sold in Finland were produced domestically, the state would lose 700,000 marks because of reduced toll income but the benefit due to employment effect would be between 17–27 million marks.

John Hellsten was replaced by Tor Nessling as general manager in 1932. Nessling started to develop the business determinedly; the technical challenges caused by weak locally produced parts were resolved by time and the degree of domestic work could be increased. Another, persistent problem was the continuous lack of cash reserves. Nessling tried to lobby the government underlining the positive effect of domestic vehicle production, but he was not listened, and the state reduced the tolls of imported vehicles making competition more intense. The company owners did not believe in the potential of domestic vehicle industry and Nessling could obtain a large part of the shares from the funding banks for relatively cheap, eventually owning 80% of SAT. The continuous pressure and repeating setbacks did not discourage the personnel and management, who did what ever it took to solve out the challenges. Over time the technical quality was reached to a such level that SAT could convince the customers that the relatively high price of Sisus, compared to imported vehicles, pays off due to their robustness.

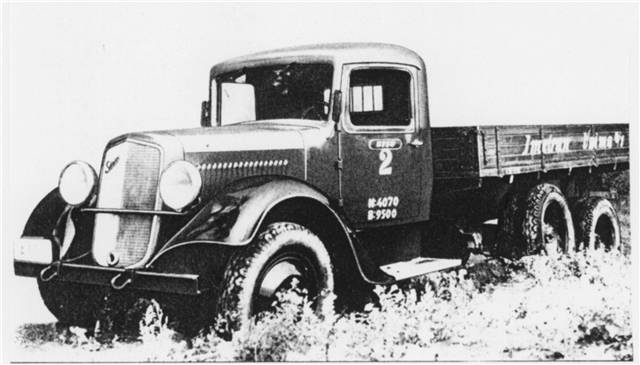
Three-axle Sisu SH-3R-LF from 1935

In 1934 The Volvo-based S-321 and S-341 series were followed by short-lived SO-series, which was already in 1935 replaced by the SH-series, with which SB-series was produced in parallel 1938–1941. The first three-axle lorry was produced in 1935.

The first country where Sisus were exported was Estonia, where SAT sold the first SH-2 chassis in 1936. Due to the contemporary Estonian taxation system, complete vehicles could not be exported there, and therefore the cabins and superstructures were built locally. More units were sold in 1938. Latvia was the first country where complete Sisus were exported. The city of Riga bought a series of forward control buses powered by Hercules diesel engines which were delivered in 1937 and 1938. The complete number of vehicles exported to the Baltic states before the Second World War is not known but the business was regarded successful.

=== 1939 to 1945: Second World War ===
==== Changes in line of production ====
When the Winter War broke out, as a strategically important company SAT went under military administration. A part of the production was moved to Järvenpää and Lahti. The company produced for example aerial bombs and transportation devices for them.

Right after the Winter War in spring 1940 SAT started producing an own carburettor type under name Häkä for carbon monoxide fuel. Technically the carburettor was not one of the most successful of its kind. The development work was continued with subsidies of the state until it was finally filed in 1946 as unnecessary due to improved availability of petrol.

SAT started own engine production in 1940 under Hercules licence. This together with tram building and 1942 started axle production led to lack of space in the factory area. The first plans of moving some of the production out from Helsinki were made already before the war. The plan was put into practice due to the war which made the factory located in the capital vulnerable to Soviet air raids. In 1942 the construction of new premises began in Karis, which was out but sufficiently reachable from Helsinki. Coach- and cabin building was transferred first, after which the tram production followed; building of lorries stayed exclusively in Helsinki until 1950.

The 1942 introduced Sisu S-15 bus chassis was the first Sisu entirely built by using domestically produced components.

The scope of production remained diverse until the 1950s partly due to war reparation industry. SAT produced parts for Finnish paper machine builders and other engineering companies.

==== Yhteissisu ====
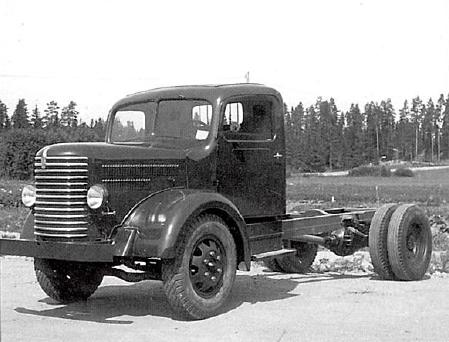
Sisu S-22 made by Yhteissisu

At the same time when SAT built the new factory in Karis, the Finnish Defence Forces reported needing thousands of vehicles in the near future. SAT suggested building the factory larger in order to meet the demand. However, the importers of other makes as well as some politicians suspected that SAT tried to use the war to gain a dominant position in the Finnish market. Eventually, an agreement was reached in 1943 when SAT, the state and a number of Finnish companies set up a separate company Yhteissisu to produce lorries. SAT and Yhteissisu signed a contract about transferring Sisu S-21 lorry production to Yhteissisu. Vanaja municipality next to Hämeenlinna was selected for the factory location.

The war was over before Yhteissisu could start serial production at the full scale. Yhteissisu had the right to use the Sisu-brand until June 1948. When this expired, the company was renamed Vanajan Autotehdas (VAT) and its products were named Vanaja. VAT became a strong competitor to SAT in the Finnish market which was small but still protected by import restrictions.

According to the contract with Yhteissisu, SAT was not allowed to produce lorries during the five years' period. SAT made Sisu S-15 buses but some of the chassis were fitted with lorry cabins and superstructures.

=== 1945 to 1969: Growth and diversification ===
In 1949 SAT made a return to lorry production with the Sisu K-23. The first heavy forward control lorries were the 1956 produced B-56 and 1958 introduced B-72, both of them being built on bus chassis. The small forward control lorry Nalle-Sisu KB-24 came to market in 1955. Other notable models introduced in the 1950s are the heavy dumper trucks K-36, the first 6×4 driven Sisu, K-32, and K-44 with a North European specialty, 4×4+2 layout.

SAT started partnership with Leyland Motors Ltd. in 1950. The background originates to friendship between the general managers of both companies, Tor Nessling and Donald Stokes. For a while the SAT test department investigated for possibilities of producing Leyland engines under licence; trials for better output and torque were made on test bench with turbocharged applications, before Leyland even had taken such into production. As a part of the partnership SAT became representative of Leyland products in Finland.

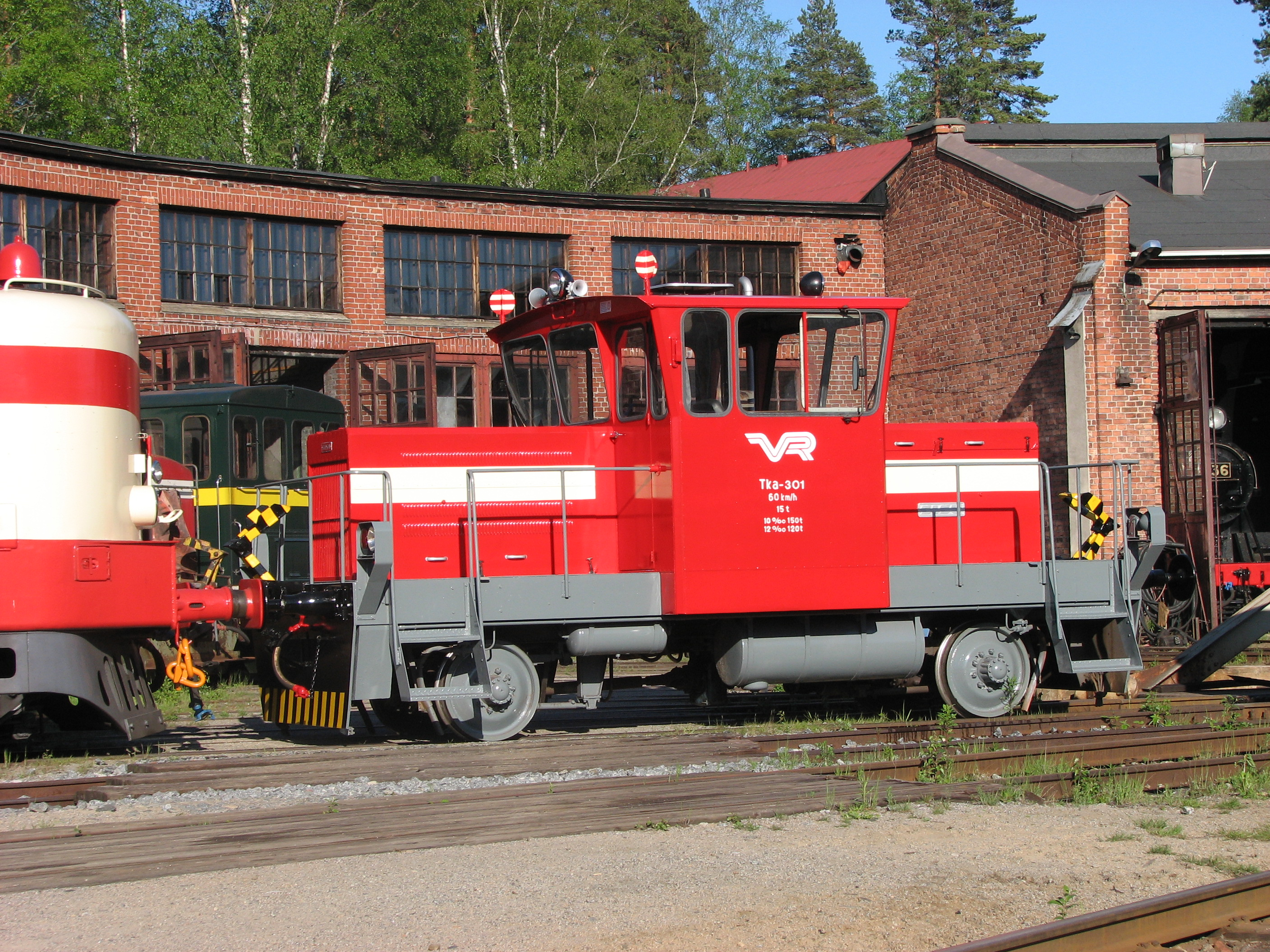
Sisu JA-7 rail truck (VR Tka 3)

The 1954–1959 produced trams equipped with two-axle bogies featured progressive steel structure technology that Valmet and Tampella later copied for their jointly developed tram type. SAT produced 4×4-driven "rail trucks" for railway maintenance work under assignment of the Finnish State Railways in the 1950s. The first ones, JXB 7, JXB 12 and JXB 13 were equipped with a one-man cabin; later came JA-4 and JA-5 with cabins for three. The mechanical crane was replaced by a hydraulic one in the 1966–1972 produced JA-9SV, JA-12, JA-14 and JA-16. From 1958 SAT produced rail control vehicles which were equipped with coachwork similar to forward control buses. Some of them were produced jointly with Kiitokori and VAT. Also some KB-48 4×4 road-rail lorries were delivered. Altogether SAT delivered 150 rail trucks of various types to the State Railways. In 1963–1970 SAT produced three types of two-axle light diesel locomotives. The Sisu JA-7 were powered by Leyland diesels and the railway company used designations Tka 2 and Tka 3.

SAT sold a number of Hercules-based Sisu AMG engines to Dutch DAF and got as payment total 96 pieces of forward control DAF models K-50, P-50 and A-50 in 1951. The vehicles were delivered without engines, some of them were lacking of gearboxes and electric components. They were equipped with the same Sisu AMG engines and other Sisu parts at the Fleminginkatu factory in Helsinki. The last units were sold in 1954.

In 1951 and 1955–1957 SAT imported total 105 Trojan vans. The first imported vehicles undertook many changes before they met the requirements. Some of them got a Finnish made body. In 1956 SAT built a series of ten DKW Schnellasters from CKD kits imported from West Germany; they were sold with name Donau-Sisu. Additionally, some modifications were made for SAT-imported Aveling-Barford and Avelin Austin graders and dumper trucks and also Leyland Terrier and BMC Mastiff lorries.

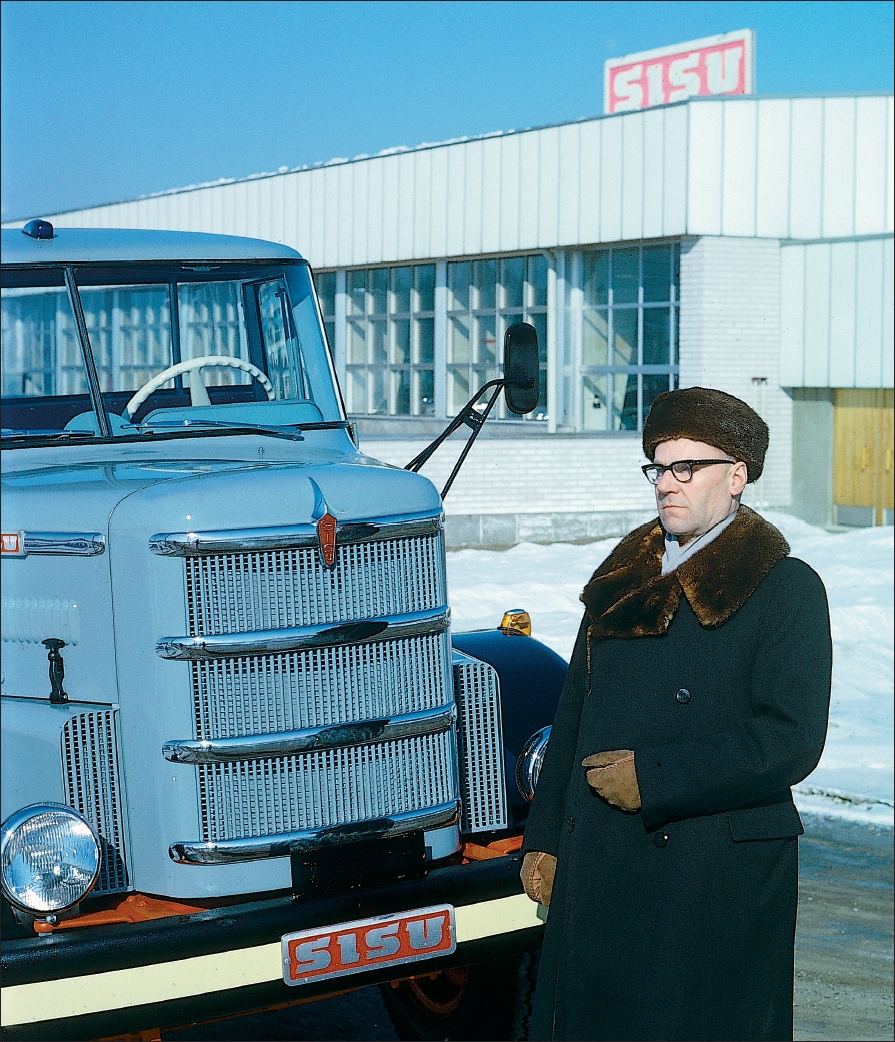
General Manager Tor Nessling during launch of Sisu K-138SV in 1962

In the 1950s Finland was the most important market for Colombian coffee. Finland and Colombia signed a bilateral trade agreement in 1959 and Colombian coffee was paid with Sisus thereafter. The trading was handled via Banco Cafetero until it changed multilateral in 1968. Colombia grew the most important export destination of Sisus. SAT had plans of starting local production in Medellín jointly with Leyland Motors but the project was eventually cancelled due to financial risks. In the early 1970s the Andean Community of Nations decided about starting its own lorry production and the successful trading came to end after about 1200 sold units.

The Karis factory grew the main production facility, when the new 157-metre-long assembly hall with nearly 100-metre production line was opened in 1961.

In 1961 SAT produced the ballast tractor K-50SS which is still the largest automobile ever built in Nordic countries. The first European serial built lorry with a hydraulically tiltable forward control cabin, Sisu KB-112, was introduced in 1962. The 1965 introduced Sisu K-148 featured bonnet and wings produced from reinforced plastic. Due to lower costs and better durability the solution was soon applied on the whole conventional cabin model range.

During the 1960s SAT made a number of innovations, experiments and extended to new areas. In 1961 the radial type hydraulic motor Sisu Nemo was patented. The main use was powering of trailer axles but Nemos were installed also in number of other applications. The 1963 introduced K-138 features another innovation of the same period: vertical ejector exhaust pipe that dilutes exhaust gases. At the early 1960s also wide tyres to substitute double wheels were tested; the experiment done together with Nokia did not, however lead to production.

In 1964 Leyland Motors became minority owner of SAT. The other owners were Tor and his wife Maj Nessling, and Arne Söderberg.

SAT got another significant facility in Hämeenlinna in 1968 when the company was merged with Vanajan Autotehdas. Production of Vanaja lorries was run down and all civil lorry production was concentrated in Karis. Instead, production of bus and mobile crane chassis, terminal tractors and military lorries were transferred to Hämeenlinna.

=== 1970 to 1993: Modernisation and restructuring ===
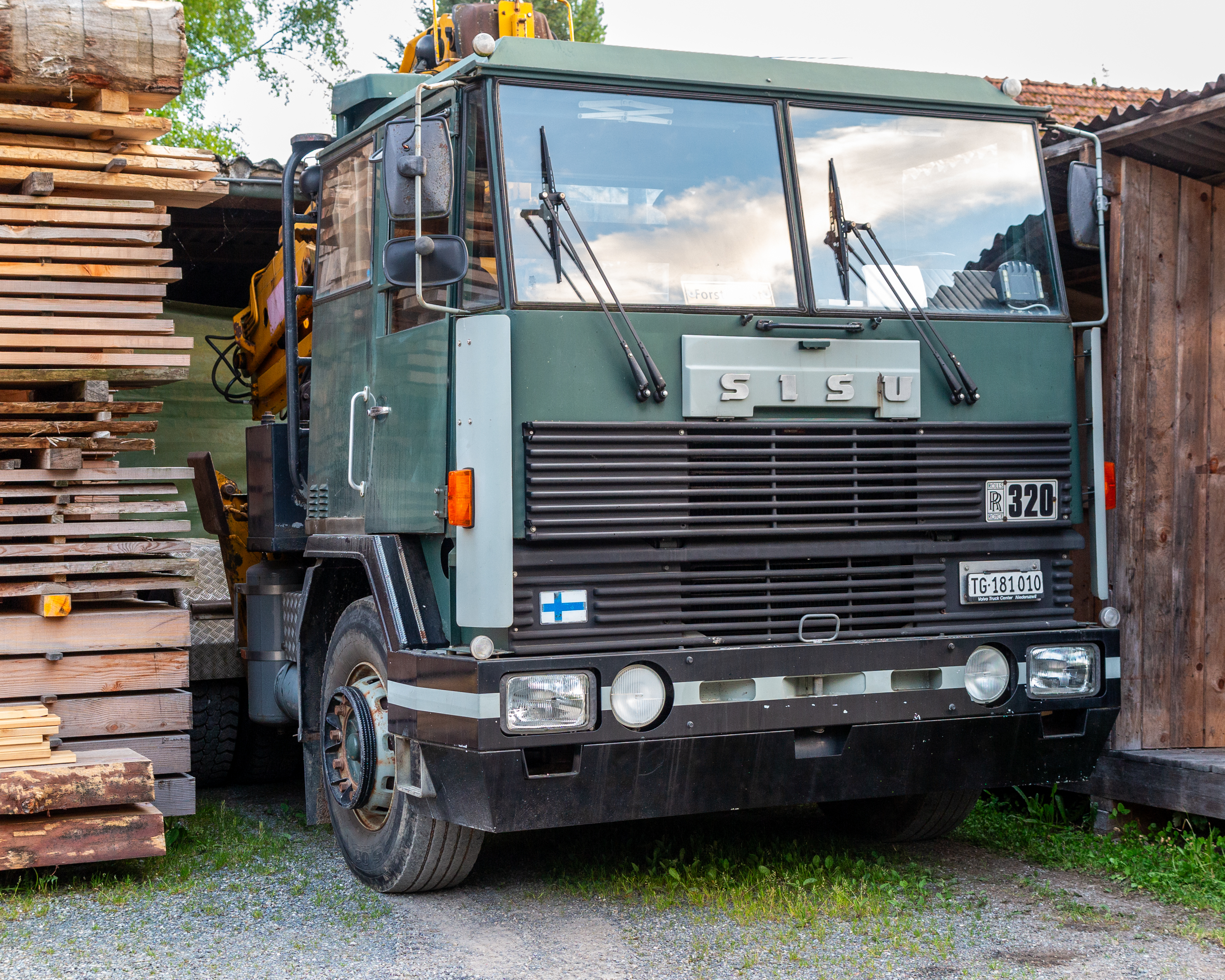
SISU M-162 with Rolls-Royce engine

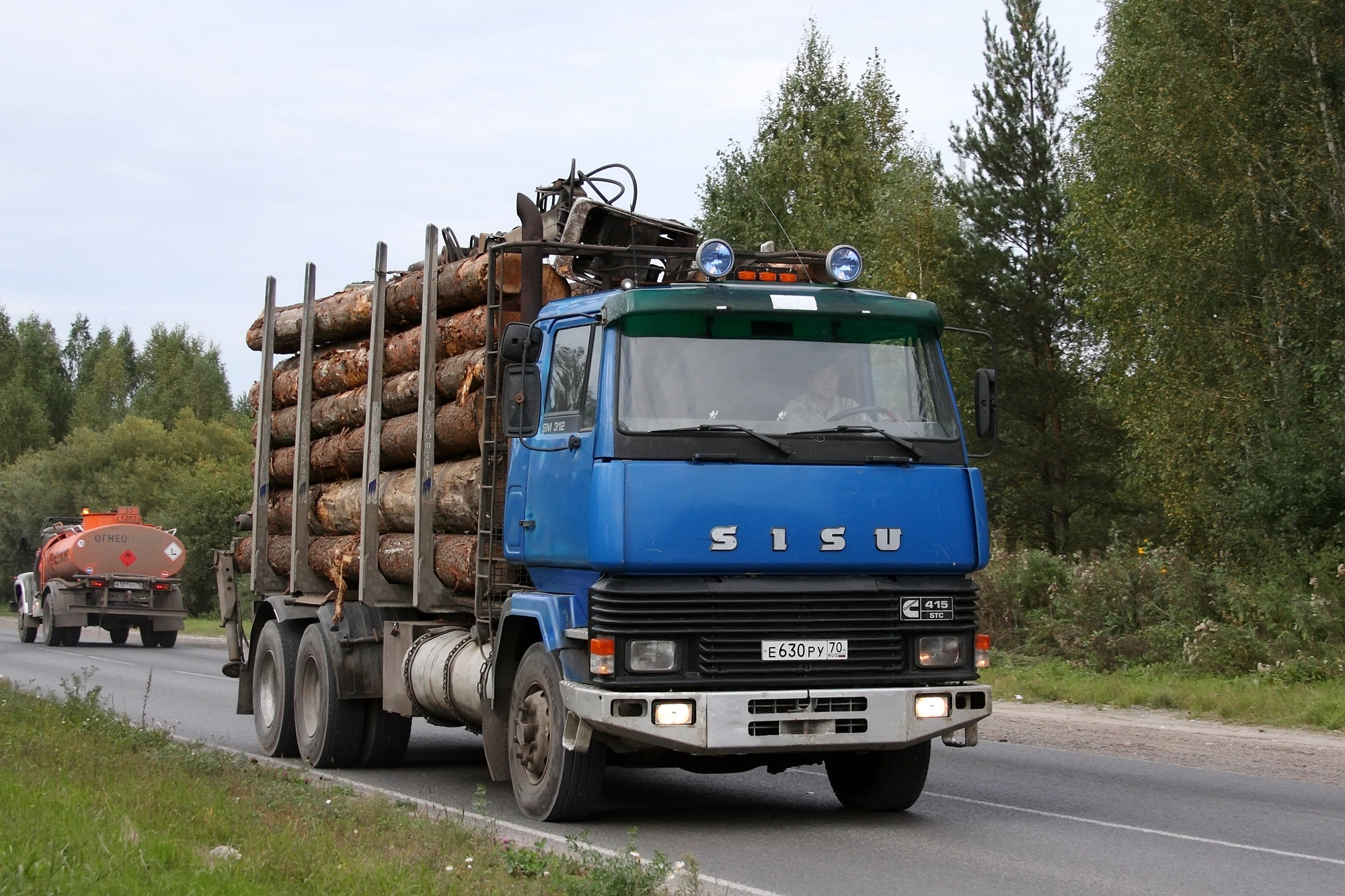
Sisu SM 312 logging vehicle

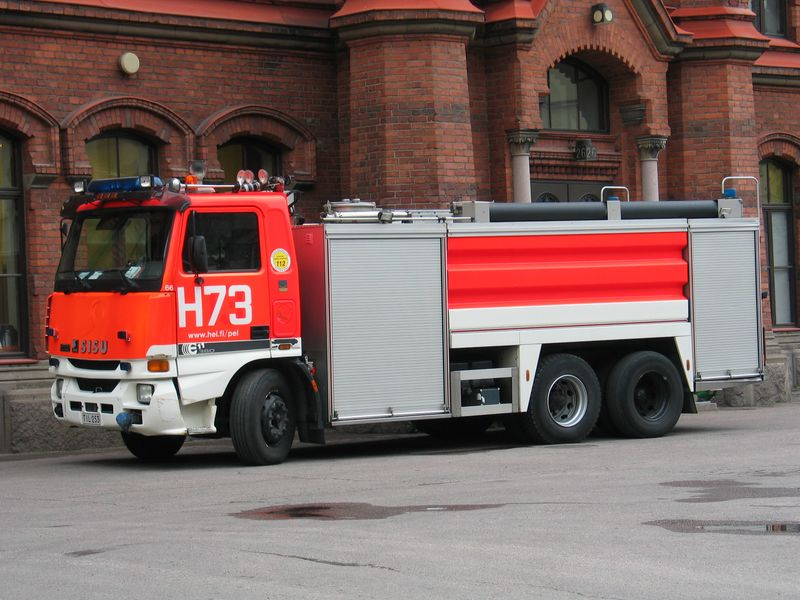
A fire engine with the short-lived first generation E-model cabin

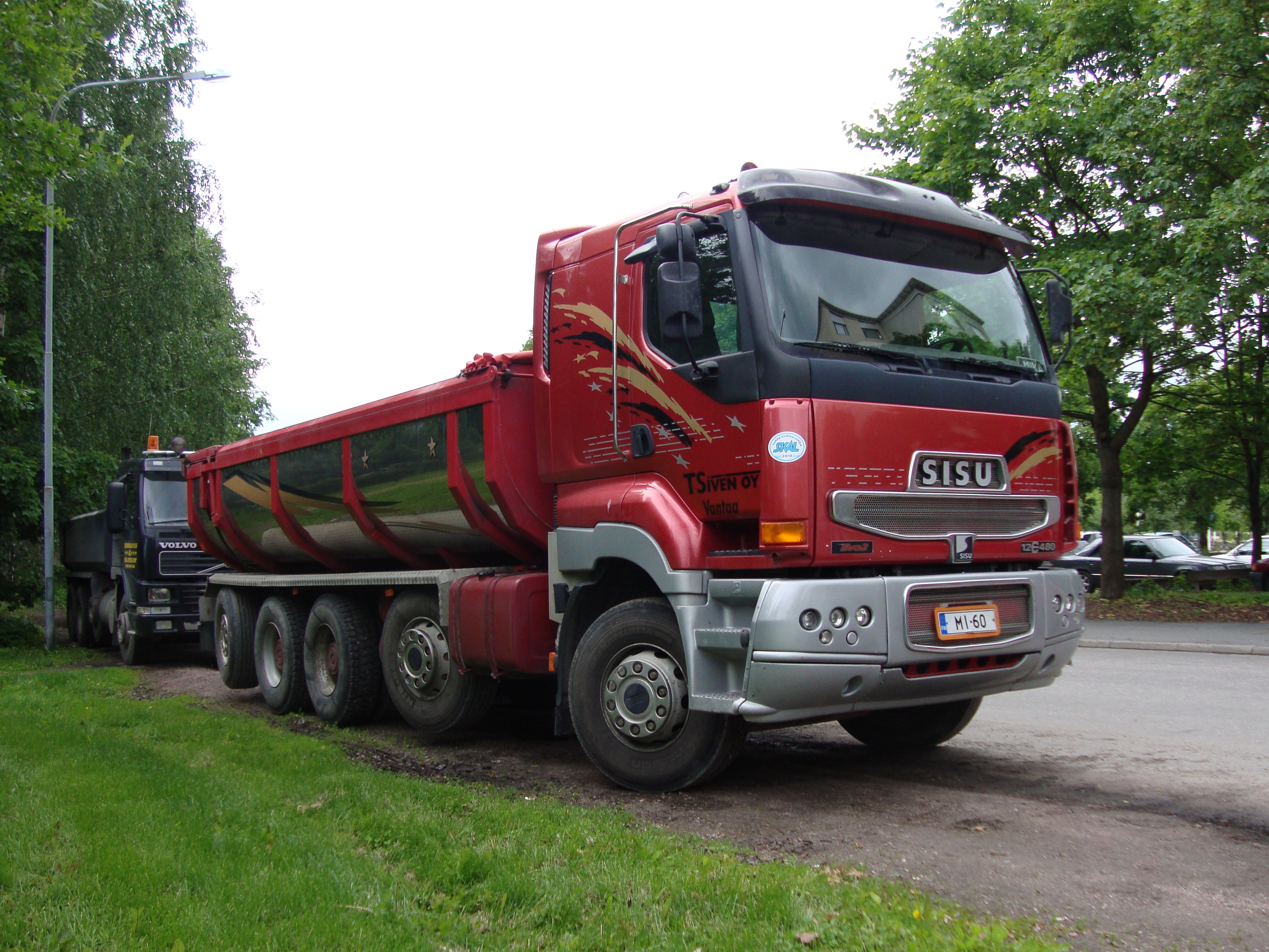
An earthmover with the first Renault type cabin

The well-proven Vanaja lifting tandem system found its way to new conventional cabin R-series and forward control M-series.

General Manager Tor Nessling resigned in 1970, after leading the company for nearly four decades. He was replaced by Erik Gillberg. Before that, the state had become an owner of the company in the VAT merger first with 17.2 percent share. The state grew its share in the company gradually. In 1976 the state signed the so-called tripartite agreement with British Leyland International and Saab-Scania, which both held 10% share of SAT thereafter.

General Manager Gillberg led SAT through an extensive renewal of the whole product range. The Sisu S-series lorries were a result of this; the first example, light forward control SK 150 was introduced in 1980. The new model series was designed in a such manner, that the same cabin modules could be used for conventional cabins as well as forward control models at different heights. Due to this, the company could offer a comprehensive selection of cabins for different purposes. The development programme had, however, demanded excessive amount of money and the company main owner, the state, removed Gillberg from office at end of 1983. He was replaced by Jorma S. Jerkku who immediately started a heavy reorganisation programme. The company management was cut smaller and moved from Fleminginkatu to Konala in 1985. After some other functions were moved to Karis and Hämeenlinna, the Fleminginkatu premises were sold. Car sales, as well as Iveco representation were discontinued at the end of 1988. In the same year the plastics factory in Mäntyharju was separated under name Simex Oy and sold. Although Jerkku's actions were shocking to many, he by all odds stabilised the company. On the other hand, the new organisation setup led to fragmentation of engineering operations between lorry, terminal tractor and military vehicle segments, and significant loss of synergy.

=== 1994 to 2003: Merger and break-up ===
In 1993 Jorma S. Jerkku was replaced by the company Vice President Heikki Luostarinen. Already year after that he was followed by Christer Granskog. A period of turmoil started: in April 1994 Sisu-Auto bought from Valmet its Transmec unit and tractor production; as a consequence, Valmet became minority owner in Sisu-Auto with 24.13% share. As also Valmet was state-owned, the state of Finland owned directly and indirectly total 99.01% part of Sisu-Auto. The new company name was Oy Sisu Ab and its business units were Sisu Tractors with 48% share, Sisu Terminal Systems (19%), Sisu Logging (12%), Sisu Trucks (10%), Sisu Defence (4%), Sisu Factory Automation (4%) and Sisu Components (3%). Subsequently, the corporation was subdivided; first Oy Sisu Trucks Ab in November 1994 and at the beginning of the following year Sisu Defence Oy, Sisu Terminal Systems Oy and Fastems Oy; additionally, Sisu Diesel Oy was separated from Sisu Traktorit Oy. In 1995 Fastems was sold to Mercantile. The Hämeenlinna axle factory became Sisu Axles Oy at the end of the year. Sinex was sold in 1996.

In January 1997 the company main owner, the state, agreed about selling main part of Sisu corporation to Partek. This was carried out by gradual shift of the ownership during the year. In the meantime, the state continued the restructuring: Germany based Stama Maschinenbau GmbH was sold to Chiron-Werke GmbH & Co. KG. Sisu Defence went to the state, which later joined it to new defence industry company Patria. Oy Sisu Ab was fully taken over by Partek by end of 1997 and it was not mentioned any more as a company in the Partek annual report.

The November 1994 newly started Oy Sisu Trucks Ab was renamed Oy Sisu Auto Ab already in the same month. At the beginning the company manager was Per-Håkan Lindberg who resigned already in February 1995. He was replaced by Pekka E. Ojanen who held the post until 2001.

The S-series, which had remained technically competitive over the whole 1980s, was finally replaced by the new E-series launched in 1996. In 1997 Sisu Auto signed an agreement of extensive co-operation with Renault V.I.; Sisu started using Renault components and represent Renault in Finland. Consequently, the new cabin model was replaced by such of Renault just one year after its introduction.

After the Partek takeover, which took place in the same year, the relative weight of lorry production became marginal in the corporate figures; it was further reduced when Kone became the owner of Partek after dramatic takeover in 2002. By now the speculations of selling the lorry production increased.

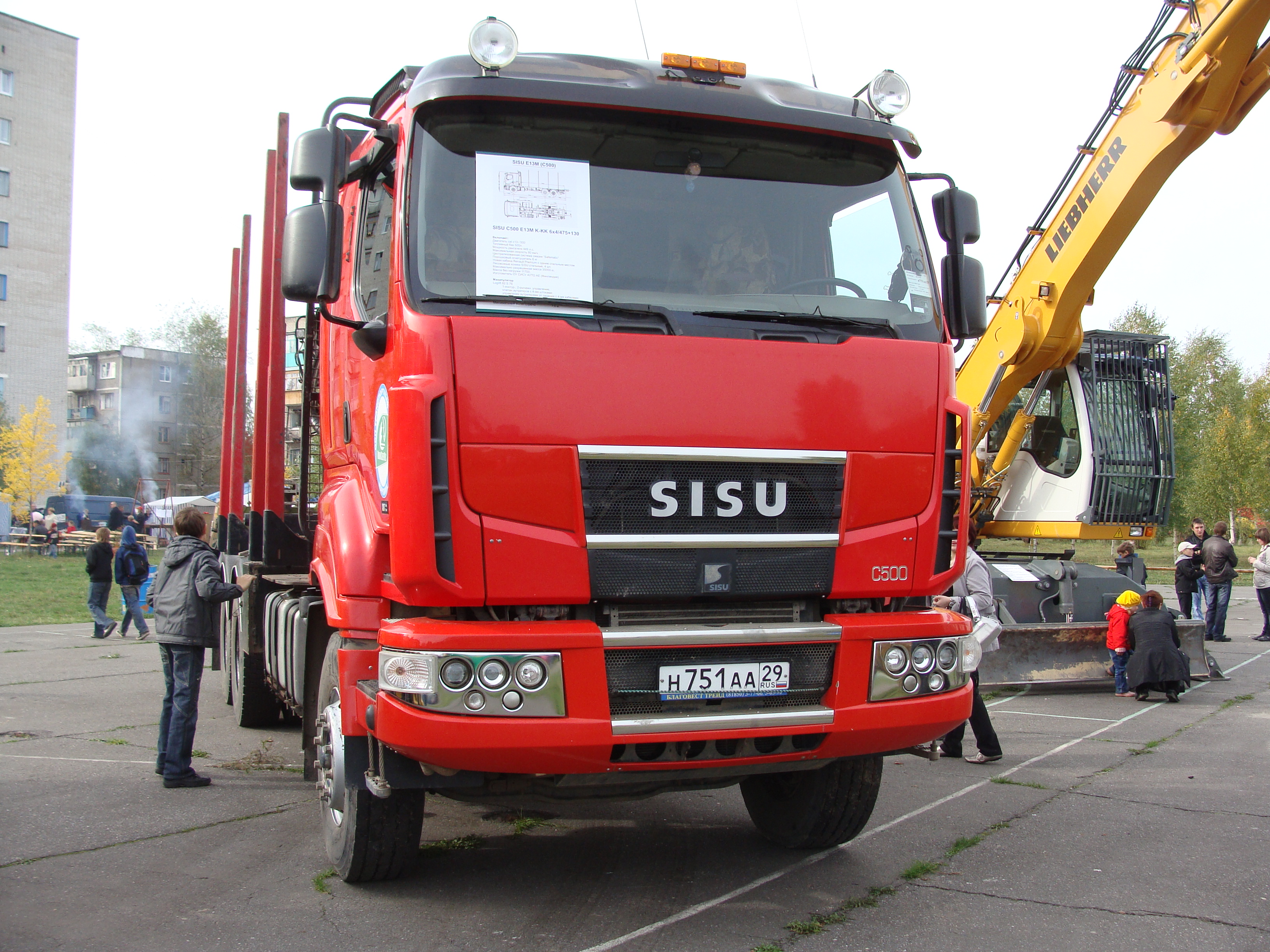
A logging vehicle with the second Renault type cabin

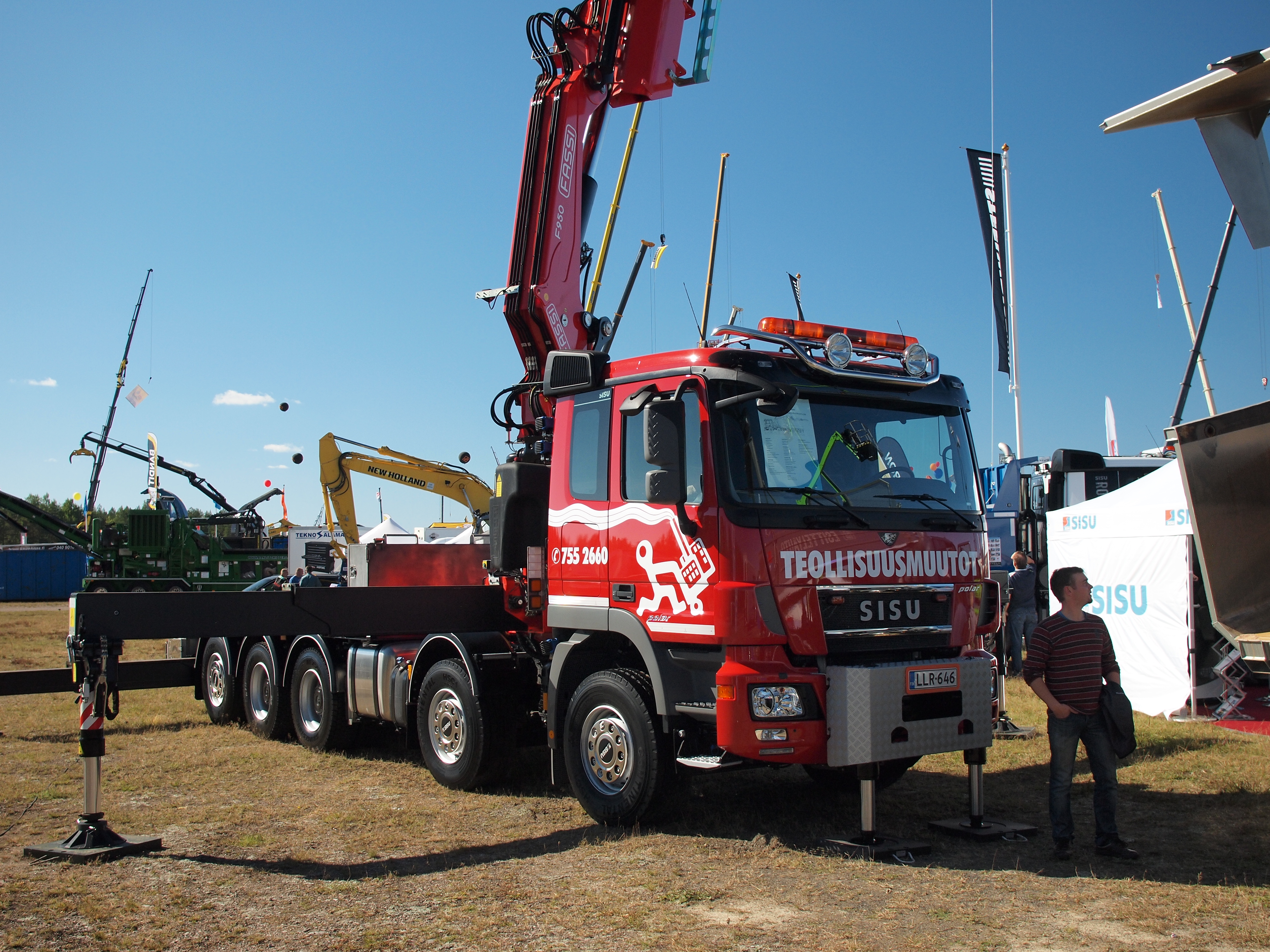
Sisu Polar mobile crane with Mercedes-Benz cabin

=== 2004 until present: New ownership ===
In 2004 a group of Finnish investors became owners of Sisu Auto, while Kone remained a minor owner with under 20% share. General Manager Nils Hagman, who had replaced Ojanen in 2001, left his position for Teppo Raitis in 2004. Raitis focussed the product scope on customised heavy duty multi axle vehicles for niche markets. Raitis was replaced by Olof Elenius in 2007 In the same year Sisu Auto had sold its aftermarket services to Veho, which also represents Mercedes-Benz. Also the sales of civil lorries were moved to Veho in 2010. The component partnership with Renault was ended in the same year; Sisu introduced the Polar series which uses components of Mercedes Benz.

The first armoured 8×8-driven Sisu E13TP military vehicles were produced in 2008. Between 2009 and 2012 the Sisu production was operated by contract manufacturer Komas.

Elenius bought the Sisu Auto shares jointly with the Deputy General Manager Timo Korhonen in 2010. In 2013 Olof Elenius left his position and sold his share to Timo Korhonen, who now became the general manager and the sole owner of the company.

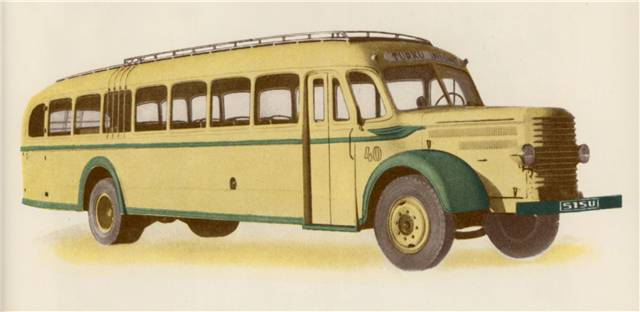
Sisu L-61 bus from 1950

=== Bus coach and chassis production ===
The first Sisu bus was produced in 1932 as a part of a pre-series of the first model. Also the coaches were produced by SAT. The bus coach production was moved to a new facility in Karis and under a subsidiary called Oy Karia Ab in 1942. Bus coach production continued until the late 1950s and Karia was merged back to SAT in 1960.

The first significant post-war bus chassis model was the 1948 introduced B-52 forward control model; the Sisu AMG engine could be rolled out for service on two rails, without dismounting of body panels.

SAT tested layout in which the engine was mounted transversely in the back in a 1965 introduced bus chassis prototype B-65 which also featured independent front suspension. SAT started partnership with the British coach producer Metro Cammell Weymann. The companies aimed to international market and a prototype was displayed in Geneva and London Motor Shows. Only few units were finally built on Sisu B-76 chassis. In 1967 SAT introduced Sisu-Panther bus chassis types B-53 and B-58, made jointly with Leyland. The chassis was progressive type, partly frameless structure, which was rushed unfinished into market leading to several warranty issues. The construction principle, however, was applicable and later used as further improved in other Sisu chassis. After merger with VAT in 1968 Sisu bus chassis production was moved gradually from Karis to Hämeenlinna. In the 1970s Sisu chassis with Lahti bodies and locally built Hess bodies were sold in Switzerland. In the late 1970s SAT produced jointly a hybrid bus prototype SWS for Helsinki City Transport together with Wiima and Strömberg.

In 1983 the company got a new general manager, Jorma S. Jerkku, who had previously worked for bus coach builder Ajokki Oy and who was aware of Sisu's position in the intense market. Consequently, Jerkku decided to end the bus chassis production in 1986. The very last Sisu buses were produced in Hämeenlinna in 1989, equipped with Ajokki coaches and delivered to a Soviet customer.

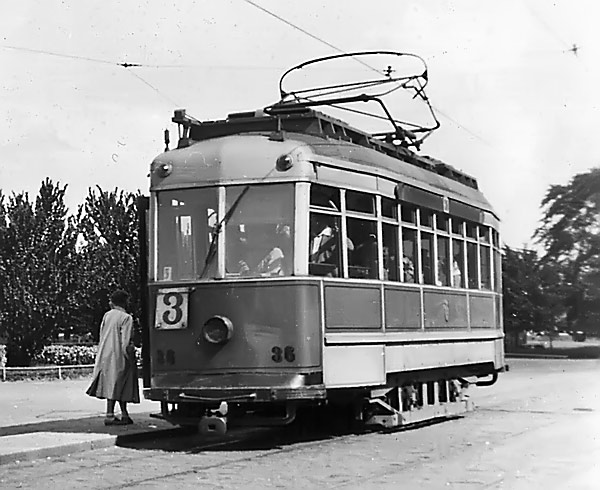
An SAT-produced tram in Turku in 1952

=== Tram production ===
In 1934 SAT started a new line of business despite the just recently ended great depression: the company started producing trams and the first three units were handed over to the city of Turku in the same year. This was followed by seven trams delivered in 1938. According to some sources, one two-axle tram was delivered to Viipuri in 1939, but this cannot be confirmed from any reliable sources. Between 1941 and 1944 total 18 units were built for the city of Helsinki and four motor trams and six wagons were sold to Turku. The influence of International Electric Company, AEG and ASEA produced models sold to Helsinki in the 1920s and early 1930s was evident.

Later the tram production was separated to a new SAT owned company OY Karia AB.

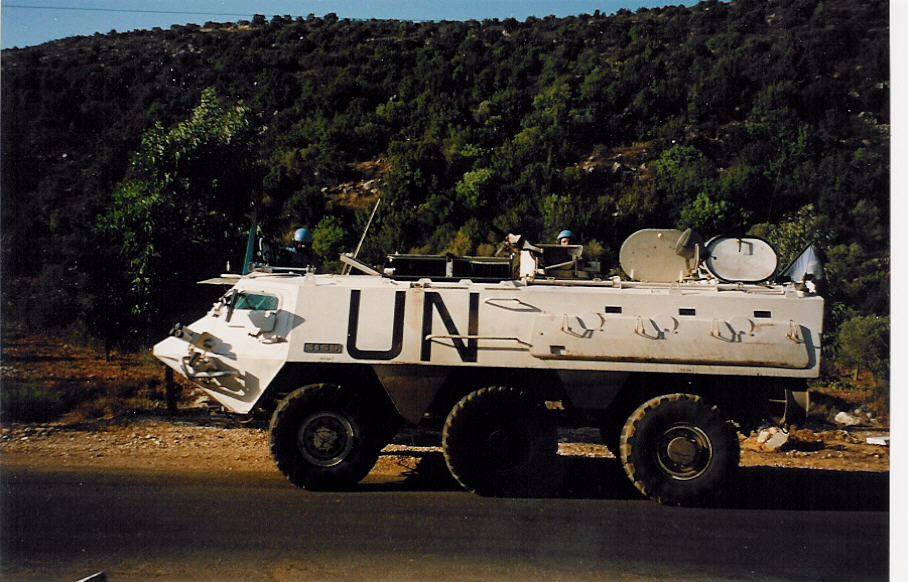
Sisu XA-180 in UN service

=== Military vehicles ===
Already the very first production lot of Sisu S-323s included customised lorries for the Finnish Defence Forces. During the Second World War lorry production was transferred to another company, Yhteissisu, which was set up to produce lorries and buses for the military. In 1958 the Defence Forces arranged a thorough test trial comparing lorries of different producers; these tests gave the Sisu K-26, modified from a civil model, a good rating. In 1959 SAT introduced Kärppä-Sisu K-35 for military use but 4×2-driven. Production of military off-road vehicles started in 1964 when SAT presented KB-45, a new light 4×4 lorry. The military vehicle production was moved from Karis to Hämeenlinna when the upgraded A-45 was presented. Medium heavy SA-150 and heavy 6×6-driven SA-240 production followed after. SA-110 was a light lorry prototype which was only produced six units. In 1990 the demining vehicle RA-140 was introduced and they were produced a small series starting from 1994.

The best known Sisu military vehicle is the armoured personnel carrier Pasi in different variants. The production of the first model, XA-180 was started in 1984 after thoroughgoing testing. Pasis have been commonly used in UN peacekeeping missions. The last Sisu-produced variant is XA-186, the later models have been produced by Patria when Sisu Defence was sold to the state. The last Pasis were produced in 2005.

Sisu Auto introduced a new series of military designated lorries based on Sisu E-series in 1997, using components supplied by Renault. This series consisted of 6×6- and 8×8-driven vehicles. This led to the re-establishment of Sisu Defence in 2005 as a part of Sisu Auto. A notable milestone was a contract of armoured Sisu E13TP 8×8 vehicles to the Lithuanian Armed Forces. A series of new light lorries Sisu A2045 was produced in 2009–2010 to replace the aged KB-45 and A-45 models.

=== Mobile crane chassis ===
VAT had started producing mobile crane chassis for Lokomo in 1968 and SAT continued the business after taking over VAT. The types were 6×4 driven T-103, which was sold as Lokomo A330/331 NS, and 8×4-driven T-108 and T-109, of which Lokomo models were A 350/351 NS and A 390/391 NS. Making of mobile crane chassis was discontinued in 1981. The production in Hämeenlinna factory totalled 542 units.

=== Vehicle imports ===
SAT planned starting vehicle imports in the late 1930s; a number of British car makes were considered, including Morris Motors products, as well as American tractors. One Austrian Steyr Typ 220 Innenlenker visited in Finland for display in early 1939. The import business started, however, shortly after the Second World War. In 1946 SAT became representative of Rolls-Royce cars and engines, Rover and Bentley followed in 1948. At the same time also West German products came to selection, for example Auto-Union cars and motor cycles and König outboard engines.

Sisus started using Leyland diesels in 1949 and the partnership was extended to automobile imports in the 1950s. As Leyland owned a part of SAT, the company was obligated to represent its products. Marketing and representing of the fragmented selection of Leyland products was unattractive business for SAT.

The first SAT-imported Renault lorries came in the early 1980s. The business was discontinued when Sisu-Auto took Iveco representation in 1982; this continued until 1988. Sisu Auto started extensive partnership with Renault V.I. in 1997. This included representation of Renault lorries in Finland. Some Renault types were sold as Sisus for a while.

=== Key components ===
==== Engines ====
The first Sisus were powered by Volvo supplied Penta engines. The 1934 presented Sisu SO-models were equipped with Finnish produced Olympia engines which turned out to be too weak and unreliable. Therefore, the power source was changed again already in 1935 launched SH-series which was powered by American Hercules engines. In 1937 Sisu became available with Hercules diesel engine but they were not sold many yet. In the following year another American engine, Buda was added in the selection – this Sisu-series was called SB respectively.

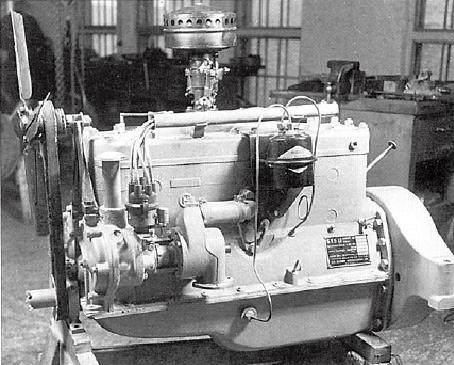
Sisu AMG, a licence-built Hercules JXC

During and after the Second World War SAT produced Hercules side valve petrol engines under licence. The initial model was called AMG of which military designation was SA-5; it was also produced by Tampereen Pellava- ja Rauta-teollisuus as Tampella 6000. It was followed by upgraded versions AMH, AMA and AMI. Other variants were marine models VMG and VMI Speedmarine and stationary engine PMG. PMGs were used on winches and compressors delivered to Soviet Union as war reparation. The last SAT-produced Hercules based engine unit was mounted on the first Sisu KB-45 military lorry prototype in 1964.

In the 1950s the lorry and bus model selection diversified heavily and diesel engines became more common pushing aside the self-produced petrol engines. For a short time in late 1940s Hercules diesels were used, but as soon as their production ended, SAT was forced to find new power options. West German Henschels proved sturdy engines, but their power-to-weight ratio was not good, and moreover, the vehicle structures suffered from the heavy engine. Henschel was finally dropped off from the selection because the weakening Finnish mark in relation to German mark made them too expensive.

The first Sisu with British made Leyland engine came already in 1948. From the early 1950s Leyland was virtually the standard power source in Sisus for during the following three decades; about 30 different types were in use. Some of the types were very robust but also technically failed units appeared with repeating problems; the Leyland O.801 V8 diesel is particularly mentioned as one of the worst. By the early 1970s Leylands had remained too weak for the increased permissible vehicle total weights in Finland.

Rolls-Royce diesels came into selection in 1955 in Sisu K-36, the strongest flatbed hauler in Finland at its time. The 250-hp engine type was C6SFL. Later the same engines were used in some dumper trucks and in 1961 in K-50SS, the up-to-date largest automobile built in the Nordic countries. In 1966 SAT produced vehicles with 300-hp Rolls-Royce diesels; the Sisu K-142SS was one of the most powerful trucks in Finland and advertised as "the king of the highways". The Rolls-Royce Eagle engines became to the selection in 1967. The 1970 introduced R- and M-series had initially the 282-hp Eagles; a number of variants with different outputs were presented after.

Cummins was used for the first time in 1966–1968. The model was Cummins Vale V8 which caused a lot of warranty costs. Next time Cummins came into use in 1978; the 6-cylinder engines gained soon a good reputation pushing aside the other engine makes and Cummins became almost an exclusive engine supplier for Sisu trucks. It maintained its position until the 1990s.

In 1997 Renault started a component supply partnership with Sisu. In parallel with Renault Engines, American Mack came to the selection. The 2002 introduced Sisu with 630-hp Caterpillar C-18 engine raised Sisu to new level of power. For a while Sisu had in its selection most powerful serial produced lorry of Europe.

Valmet engines were used occasionally in various Sisu models since 1969. The first version was a four-cylinder type 411 available for Kontio-Sisu LP-138. Later a horizontally mounted 611 was used to power the modular chassis SB-127 "Moni-Sisu" designated for buses and special vehicles. Also some 1980s produced S-type Sisus used Valmet. Valmet was the dominant engine in military vehicles during the 1980s. They were dropped off from selection in the 1990s because the engines were not powerful enough and did not fulfill the emission regulations for on-road use.

Various other engine models were used in small numbers. Due to delivery problems of Leyland in the 1950s, Perkins diesels were offered as an option for K-28 for a short time. During 1960s Kärppä-Sisu K-35 was available with BMC diesel. SAT had Ford Dagenham diesels in engine selection in 1958–1972 and they were available for Nalle-Sisu KB-24, KB-124 and KB-121 models. AEC engines were used in 1970 to power some rail vehicles and buses. The Sisu terminal tractors as well as mobile crane chassis used typically customer-designated engines; common options were Cummins, Deutz, Fiat/Iveco, Leyland, Perkins, Scania and Volvo. DAF delivered horizontally mounted six-cylinder engines for Sisu bus chassis in the middle of the 1980s, shortly before the production of bus chassis ceased.

Petrol engines came back into use in NA-110GT which uses GM V8 engine, and NA-140BT with Rover V8.

==== Gearboxes ====
Sisu was among the first to use 5-speed gearbox with overdrive. During the Second World War produced Sisu S-21 featured ZF gearboxes, which were later, in the Yhteissisu produced units, substituted by domestically produced Rosenlew products. The non-synchronised Fuller was the leading transmission type until the 1990s when the synchronised ZF and Renault gearboxes became more popular. When Sisu Auto started component partnership with Mercedes-Benz, the MB Telligent and PowerShift gearboxes came to selection, the non-synchronised Fuller still remaining as an option.

==== Axles ====
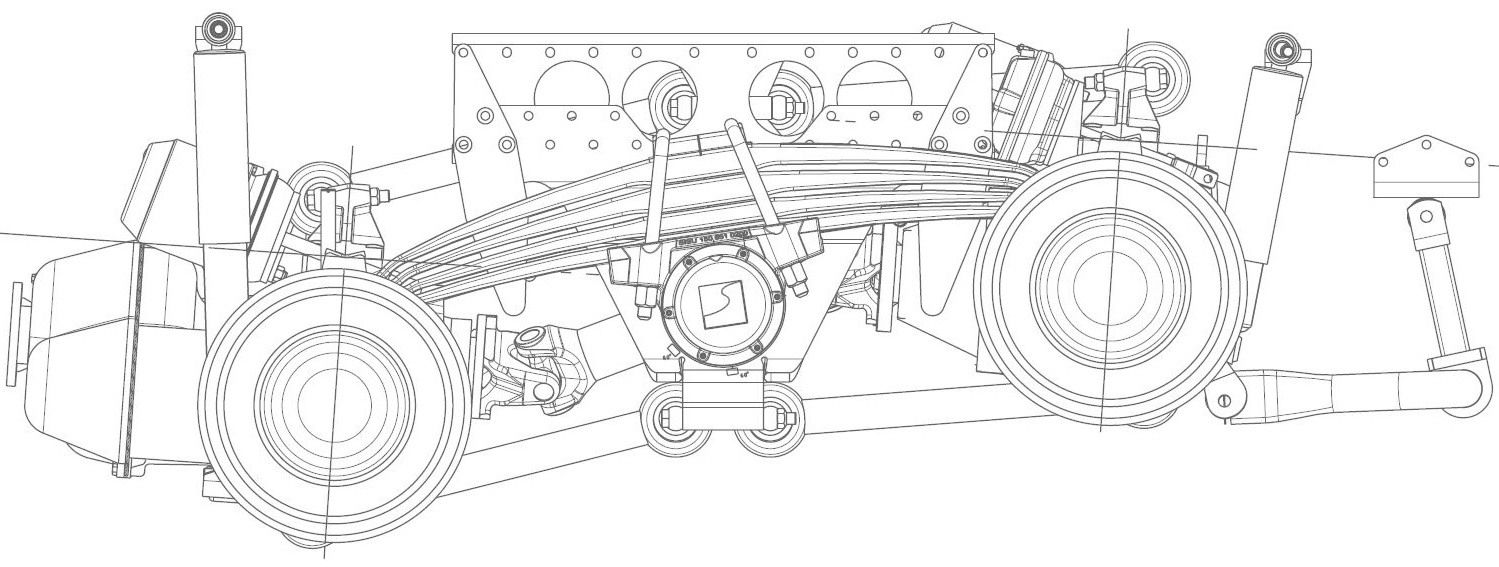
The famous Sisu lifting tandem mechanism. The concept was originally developed by Vanajan Autotehdas.

The axles used in early Sisu models were produced by Timken. Later the axle housings were locally produced. In 1942 SAT started its own axle production; the first models were based on Timken products and produced in Helsinki. Kirkstall axles were later used in some applications. Soon after Vanajan Autotehdas was merged into SAT in 1968, the outstanding lifting tandem system, used previously in Vanaja lorries, was adopted to Sisu; the robust structure was most welcome because the SATs own corresponding solution was suffering of fractures. Axle production was moved to Hämeenlinna in 1985 and axle production was split off as a separate company, Sisu Axles, and finally sold to investors in 1999. During the Renault partnership also Renault axles were in selection.

==== Cabins ====
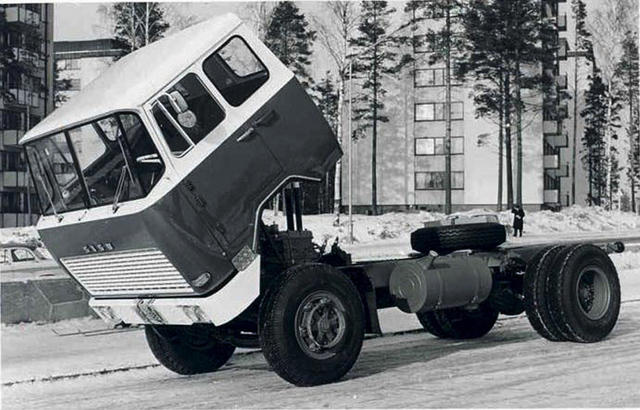
The Sisu KB-112/117, introduced in 1962, was the first serial produced European lorry with a hydraulically tiltable cabin.

The very first Sisu cabins were self-produced with vertical windscreen but later they were reshaped to a more sleek appearance. External producers were used already since end of the 1930s. The common practice was that the customer selected the cabin supplier. Some of the cabin suppliers were Auto-Heinonen, Messukylän Autokoritehdas, Valmet, Tampella, Ajokki, Lahden Autokori, Kar-Pe, Linjakori and Kiitokori – the last one was the most significant supplier during the 1950s and 1960s. Also the SAT-owned Karia was a significant supplier. Some Jyry-Sisus sold in Sweden were equipped with locally produced Be-Ge Karosserifabrik cabins. Until the 1950s the cabins had typically a wooden frame. The first completely steel structured cabin came in 1955 introduced Sisu KB-24. The structure was soon adopted also in other Sisu models. The diversity of cabins was narrowed down at the early 1960 when structurally integrated cabins became more common. A typical example is KB-112/117 with a tiltable cabin.

In 1965 K-148, the first Sisu with a plastic bonnet, was introduced. Soon plastic became used also in front wings as well as forward control cabin internal engine covers and dashboards. KB-45 got a plastic roof and back wall. SAT opened a new facility in Mäntyharju for plastic part production; parts were made also for Scania and bus coach builders.

One of the most distinguishing cabin type is the riveted forward-control M-series cabin which was introduced in 1969. They were also sold to Northern Irish Dennison Truck Mfg. Ltd. which used them in their largest lorries. The modularised S-series and the following E-series cabins were sold to Russian KamAZ and Hungarian Csepel in the 1990s. Soon after the introduction of the E-series the company ended the own cabin production in 1997 and sourced them from Renault. A new cabin type was introduced in 2005 for the last E-type generation. For the 2010 introduced Polar series Sisu has sourced cabins, as well as many other key components, from Daimler.

=== Model nomenclature ===
==== Model codes 1932–1934 ====
In 1932–1934 the two first numbers in the first model names, for example S-321 and S-342, included the year of introduction. The last number indicated the wheelbase. Between 1934 and 1942 the model name included one or two letter after the S showing the engine type and a number indicating the wheelbase: SH-1 was with Hercules engine and short wheelbase. The engine manufacturer code was dropped off in 1943 when SAT started its own engine production, and the number in model meant the sequence of the model series, S-21 as an example; the model series numbering was in use until 1983. The engine code made a return for period of 1946–1948 and now the first letter indicated if the model was bus chassis or a lorry: LG-51 meant bus ("linja-auto") and G stood for Sisu AMG engine.

==== Model codes 1948–1983 ====
The practice started in 1948 included letter indicating the vehicle type and model series; letters L, and gradually replaced by B, were used with bus chassis, although sometimes these applications were fitted with lorry cabins and superstructures. L-model buses can be distinguished by two-digit model series codes; later L made a return to Sisu model names in lorries, but with three-digit model numbers. Since 1970 the engine configuration of bus chassis was indicated with a second letter: BE meant front engined, BK middle engined and BT rear engined chassis. Conventional cabin lorries were K, U, UM, UP, L, LP, LM, LV and R. Lorries with forward control cabin were KB, M, MS, A, AH, AS, MA, MI and MK. Terminal tractor and mobile crane chassis models started with letter T. The model numbers were not consecutively running; many numbers were jumped over, as some of the numbers were used for configurations which only existed on paper. The lorry model selection of 1958 describes for example forward-control, 6×4-driven Sisu KB-104 which never materialised. The model code was followed by an engine type code, consisting two or three letters.

Between the 1950s and 1980s SAT used additional trade names for different lorry types and size ranges. The heaviest lorries were badged as Jyry-Sisu, "Rumble-Sisu". The medium-heavy model was at first Kontio-Sisu, but later renamed Karhu-Sisu, both of them meaning "Bear-Sisu". The smallest models were Nalle-Sisu, "Teddy-Bear-Sisu" and Kärppä-Sisu, "Stoat-Sisu". A short-lived trade name was 1966 introduced Ukko-Kontio, "Mighty Bear", that fell in its size between Kontio and Jyry.

==== Model codes 1977–1996 ====
A new model code system was taken to use gradually starting from 1977, when SAT introduced the SB-model, a multi-application platform "Moni-Sisu". In the new system the army applications had the second letter A; lorry models were SA, armoured personnel carriers XA and tracked vehicles NA. When the first modulised S-models was introduced in 1980, SK meant a low forward control cabin of which high variant was SM. SC was an especially low model. The conventional cabin models were low SL and SN and the high SR. There was also the option of an aerodynamic version of the S-series, called the Futura, which debuted at the Moscow Auto Show (MIMS) in August 1993. The number was not a running model number any more, but indicated the engine output in kilowatts. In the later models the value was rounded in accuracy of ten. The engine code letters was added at the end. This was followed by letter H if the vehicle was equipped with more than two axles.

==== Model codes from 1996 until present ====
In 1996 E-series was introduced and Sisu got new model codes again. The number following the letter E was now for the engine displacement in litres. After this was letter M followed by the engine output in horsepower. The M was substituted by gap when the Renault cabin was introduced in 1997. Confusingly, the model was written differently on the badge; for example on E18 630 the model is written as 18 E 630. The 2005 introduced last model with Renault cabins got extra trade names although the official model code was still with E. C500 was used with models powered by Caterpillar and R500 with Renault engine. Also application specific trade names were taken to use: logging vehicle became Sisu Timber, earthmover Sisu Rock, hook loader Sisu Roll, road maintenance vehicle was named Sisu Works, mobile crane Sisu Crane respectively and wheeled vehicle transporter Sisu Carrier.

The 2010 introduced model with Mercedes-Benz components got the trade name Polar. The early model names are DK12M and DK16M; the K stands for high cabin, the number for engine displacement in litres and M means that the cabin is forward control type. The application specific model names are still used in parallel. In 2014 the company introduced new models, model names CK and CM while the commercial name for these products continues as Polar.

== Models ==
The currently produced models are bolded.

=== Trucks ===
- S-321 1932
- S-322 1932
- S-341 1934
- SO-2 1934
- SO-3 1934
- SO-1K 1934
- SH-1 1935
- SH-2 1935
- SH-3 1935
- SH-4 1935
- SH-6 1936
- SH-9 1938
- SH-12 1938
- SH-15 1939
- SB-18 1939
- SB-20 1939
- SB-19 1940
- S-21 1943
- S-22 1944
- K-23 1949
- S-25
- K-25 1951
- K-28 1951
- B-56 1951
- KB-27 1952
- K-29 1952
- K-30 1953
- K-31 1953
- K-33 1953
- SH-1/53 1953
- KB-24 1955
- K-26 1955
- K-32 1955
- K-34 1955
- K-36 1955
- K-38 1955
- K-41 1957
- K-43 1957
- K-37 1958
- K-39 1958
- K-40 1959
- K-44 1959
- KB-47 1959
- KB-48 1959
- K-35 1960
- K-108 1960
- K-50SS 1961
- KB-107 1961
- KB-124 1961
- KB-102 1962
- KB-112 1962
- K-138 1963
- K-134 1963
- K-143 1963
- K-42 1964
- KB-45 1964
- KB-117 1964
- K-137 1964
- K-145 1965
- K-148 1965
- K-142 1966
- K-149 1966
- K-124 1967
- K-131 1967
- U-131 1967
- K-132 1967
- K-136
- U-132 1967
- U-138 1967
- U-139 1967
- K-141 1967
- K-144 1967
- KB-46 1968
- KB-121 1968
- U-135 1968
- U-137 1968
- UM-138 1968
- UP-138 1968
- L-139 1968
- L-132 1969
- LP-138 1969
- LM-138 1969
- MS-162 1969
- A-45 1970
- AH-45 1970
- L-131 1970
- LV-132 1970
- L-137 1970
- R-141 1970
- R-142 1970
- R-148 1970
- R-149 1970
- M-162 1970
- R-145 1971
- M-161 1971
- R-143 1972
- LV-131 1973
- LV-139
- M-163 1973
- SB-171
- SN 171
- R-144 1976
- AS-45 1977
- SB-127 1977
- R-146 1978
- MA-162 1978
- M-168 1978
- L-135 1979
- SB 140 1979
- MI-161 1979
- MI-162 1979
- MK-162 1979
- RR-143 1980
- SB 150 1980
- SK 150 1980
- SK 170
- SA-150 1982
- SC 150 1982
- SD 150
- SR 220 1982
- SR 280 1982
- SM 220 1983
- SM 280 1983
- SA-180 1983
- SR 312
- SRH 300
- SRH 450
- SL 170 1983
- SL 171
- SM 242
- SL 190 1983
- SL 210 1983
- SA-240 1984
- SK 190 1984
- SK 210 1984
- SM 260 1984
- SM 300 1984
- SM 320 1984
- SR 260 1984
- SR 300 1984
- SR 320 1984
- SM 332
- SN 220
- SN 260
- SA-110 1986
- SK 171
- SA-170 1987
- SK 250 1988
- SL 250 1988
- SM 340 1988
- SR 340 1988
- SA-130 1989
- SA-241 1990
- SK 181 1990
- SL 181 1990
- SM 270 1990
- SR 270 1990
- SA-151 1991
- SA-210 1992
- SK 242
- SK 192 1993
- SK 262 1993
- SM 282 1993
- SM 372 1993
- SR 282 1993
- SR 372 1993
- SK 283 1995
- SM 283 1995
- SM 313 1995
- SM 353 1995
- SM 393 1995
- SR 313 1995
- SR 353 1995
- SR 393 1995
- E11 1996
- E11T 6×6 1998
- E14 1996
- E12 1997
- Sisu Premium 385 1997
- E11T 8×8 2001
- E18 2004
- E12M 2005
- E13 2005
- **E13TP** 2007
- **E15TP** 2007
- **A2045** 2008
- **DK12M** 2011
- **DK16M** 2011

=== Buses and bus chassis ===
- S-323 1932
- S-342 1934
- SO-4 1934
- SH-4L 1935
- SH-2L 1936
- SH-3L 1936
- SH-5 1936
- SH-7 1936
- SJ-10 1936
- SH-1B 1937
- SHD-5 1937
- SH-8 1938
- SH-10 1938
- SH-80 1938
- SHDRXB-101 1938
- SB SBD-10 1939
- S-15 1942
- LG-50 1946
- LG-51 1947
- LH-51 1948
- B-52 1948
- L-54 1949
- L-60 1951
- L-61 1951
- B-62 1951
- B-55 1952
- B-64 1952
- B-66 1954
- B-67 1954
- B-68 1954
- B-72 1956
- B-73 1956
- B-63 1957
- B-74 1957
- B-70 1959
- B-75 1961
- B-76 1962
- B-77 1962
- B-57 1963
- B-79 1963
- B-63 1964
- B-80 1964
- B-65 1965
- B-83 1966
- B-53 1967
- B-58 1967
- B-78 1967
- B-84 1968
- BT-59 1970
- BK-84 1970
- BE-91 1970
- BT-53 1971
- BT-58 1971
- BT-69 1972
- BH-90 1976
- BK-87 1977
- BT-71 1979
- SWS 1979
- BT-190 1980
- BK-150
- BK-160
- BK-200
- BK-155

=== Mobile cranes ===
- T-2SA 1961
- MSV-1 1964
- T-2SD 1965
- T-4SE 1966
- T-6BG 1968
- T103
- T109 1974
- T-108

=== Terminal tractors ===
- T-9SV 1969
- T-10 1971
- TV-10 1971
- TV-12 1974
- T-13 1977
- TR 150 1979
- TR 200 1980
- TT 125
- TR 160
- TR 180

=== Military vehicles, others than lorries ===
- XA-180 1983
- NA-140 1986
- NA-110
- NA-123
- RA-140 DS 1994
- **Sisu GTP** 2018

=== Others ===
- SH-500 1941 station bridge tractor

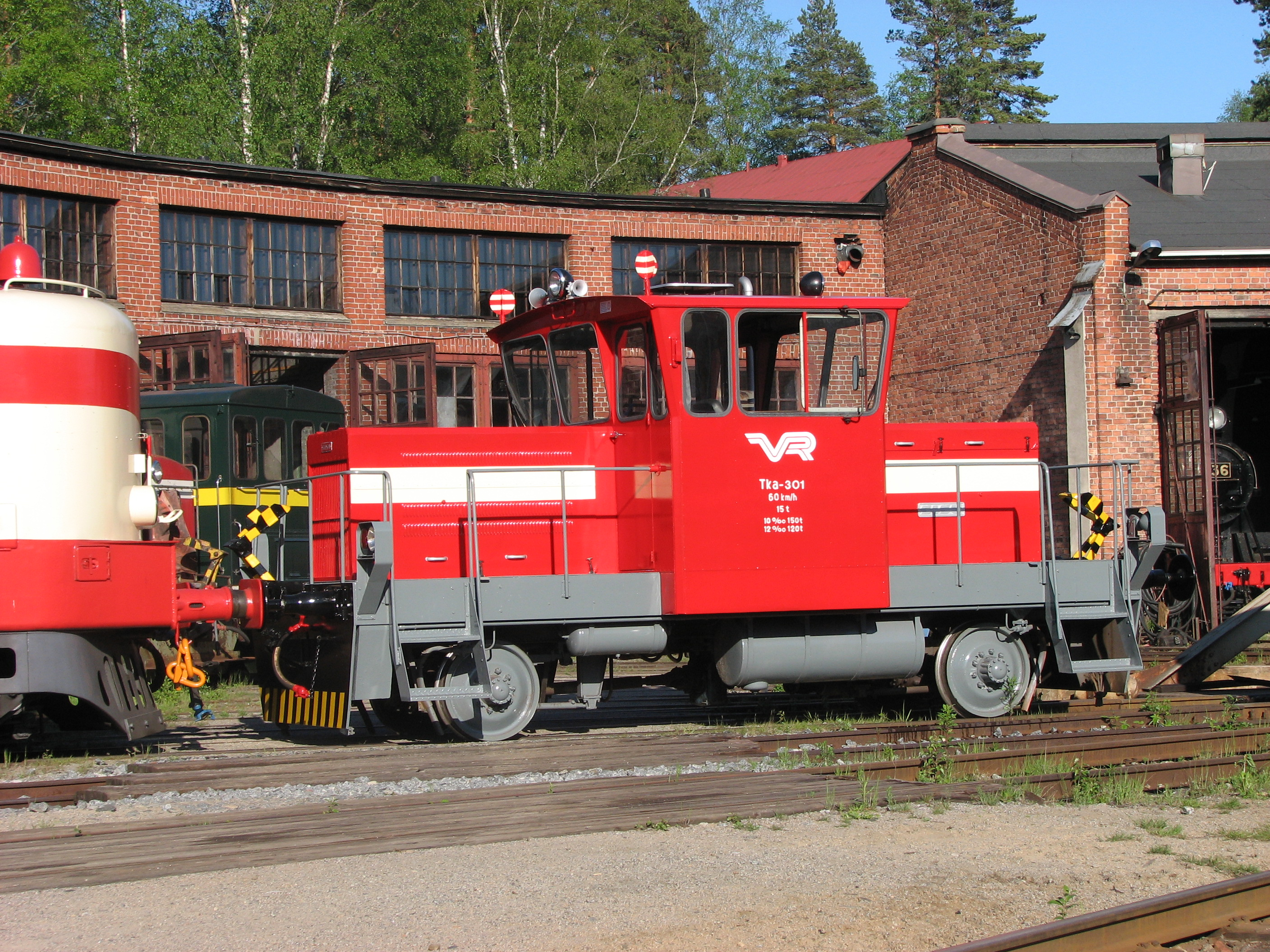
Sisu JA-7

- JA-6 1963 rail truck
- JA-7 1965 rail truck
- T-8BG 1968 drilling platform

== Gallery ==
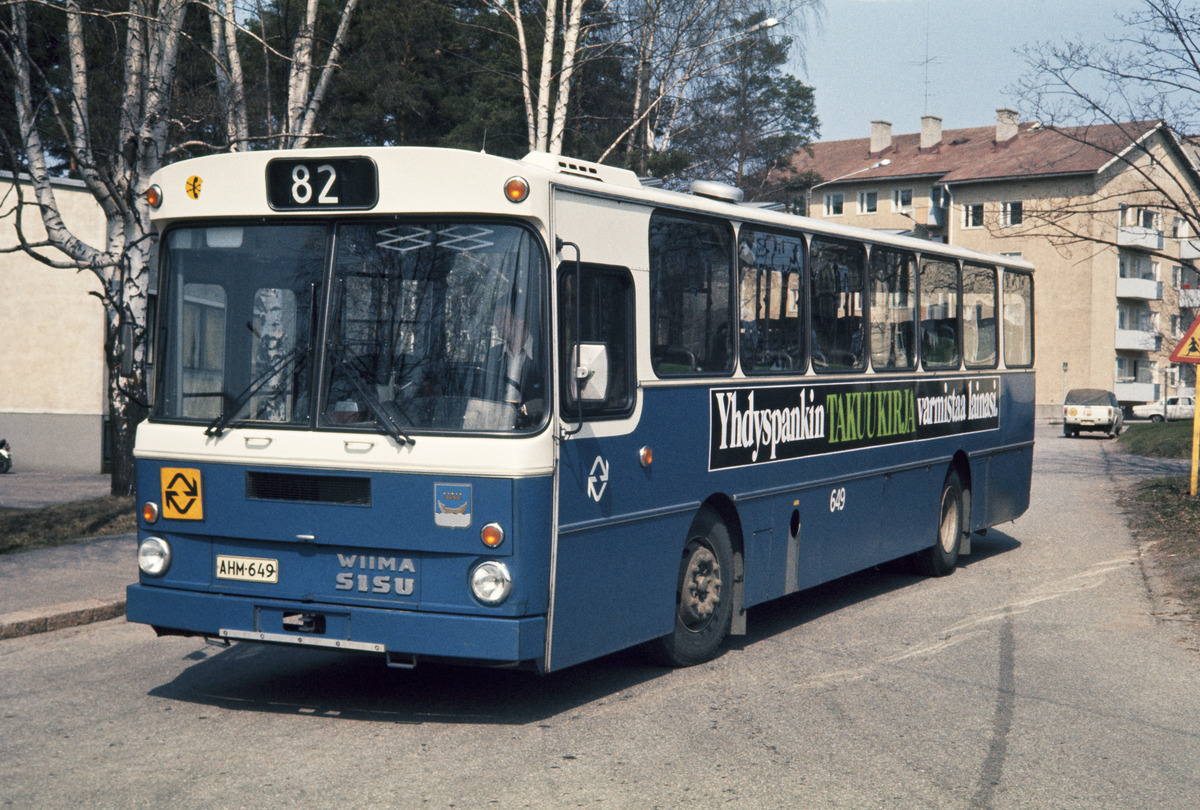
Sisu Wiima

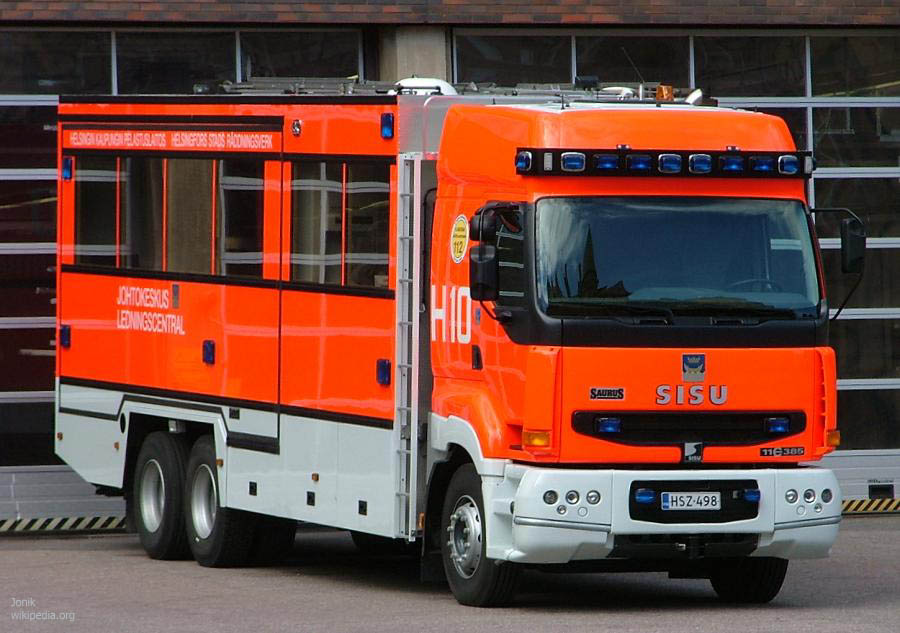
Sisu Mobile Command Post in Helsinki

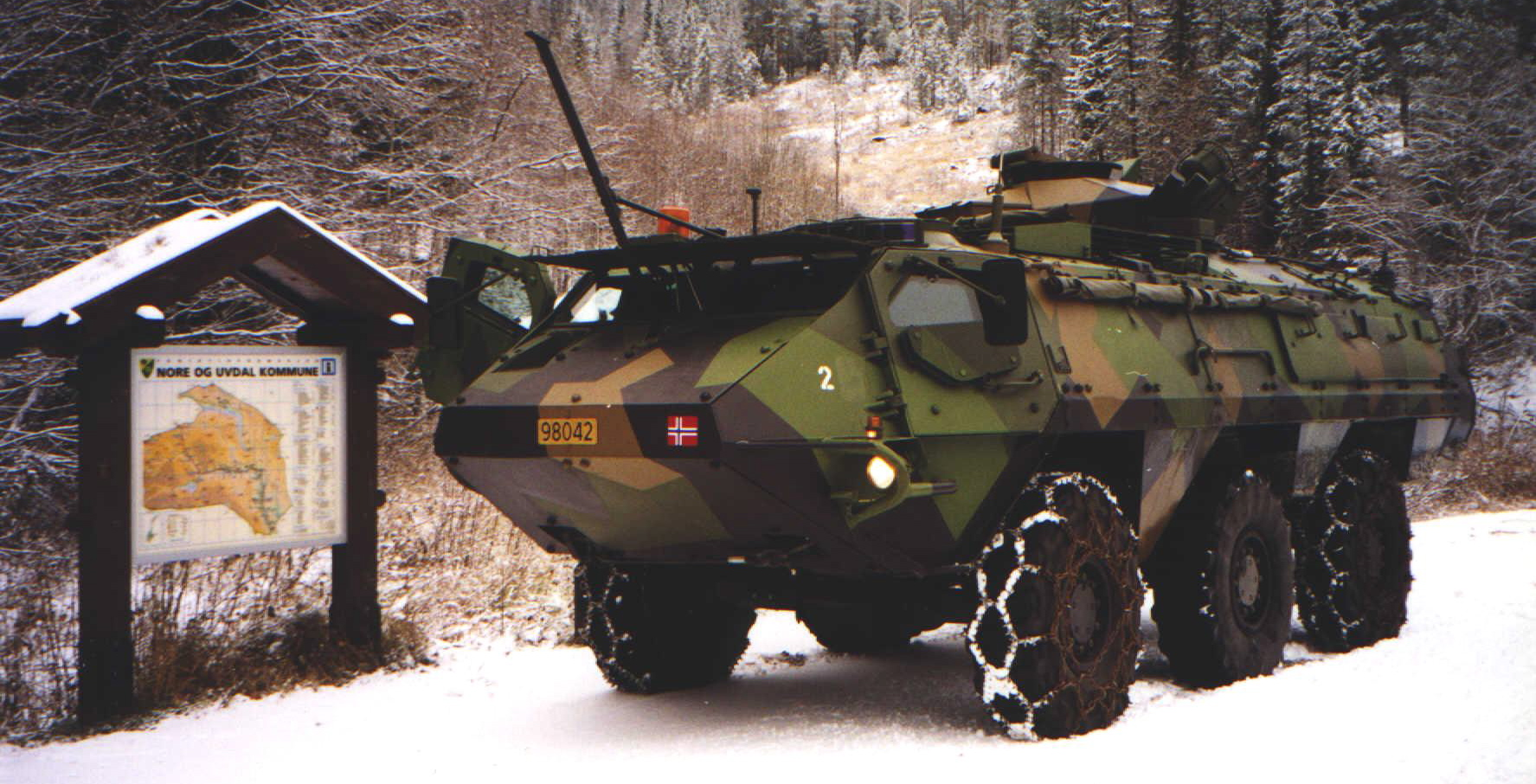
Sisu XA-186

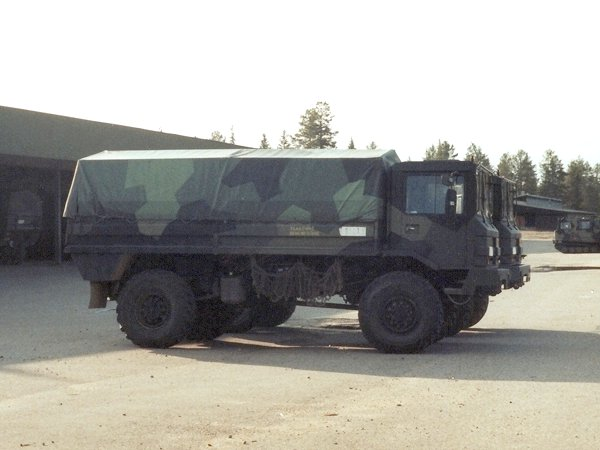
Sisu SA-150 "Masi" military vehicle

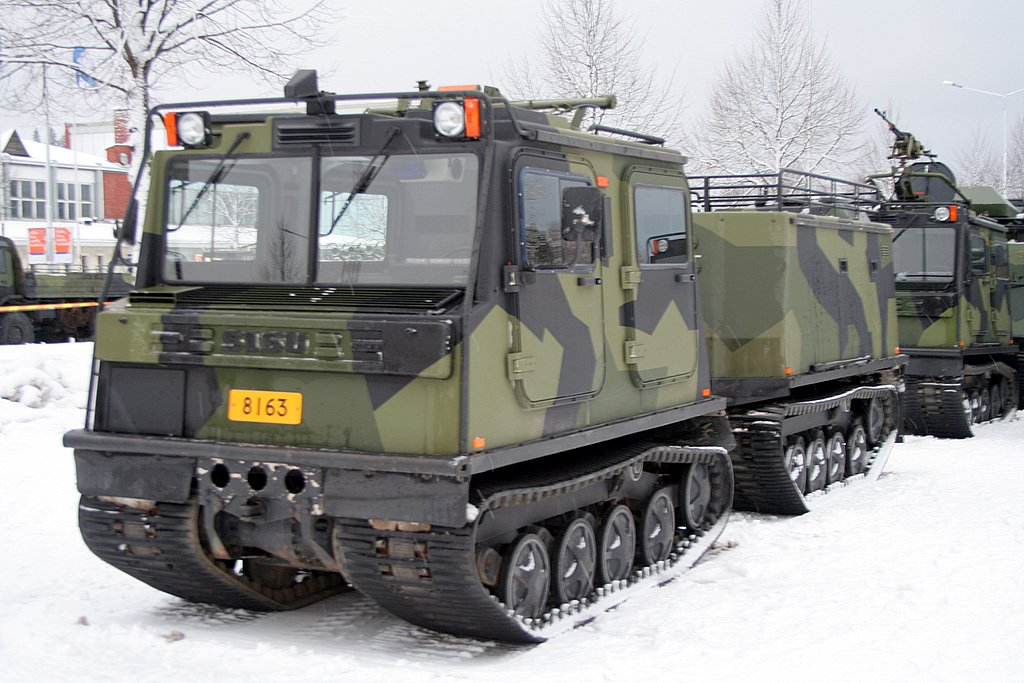
Sisu Nasu tracked military vehicle

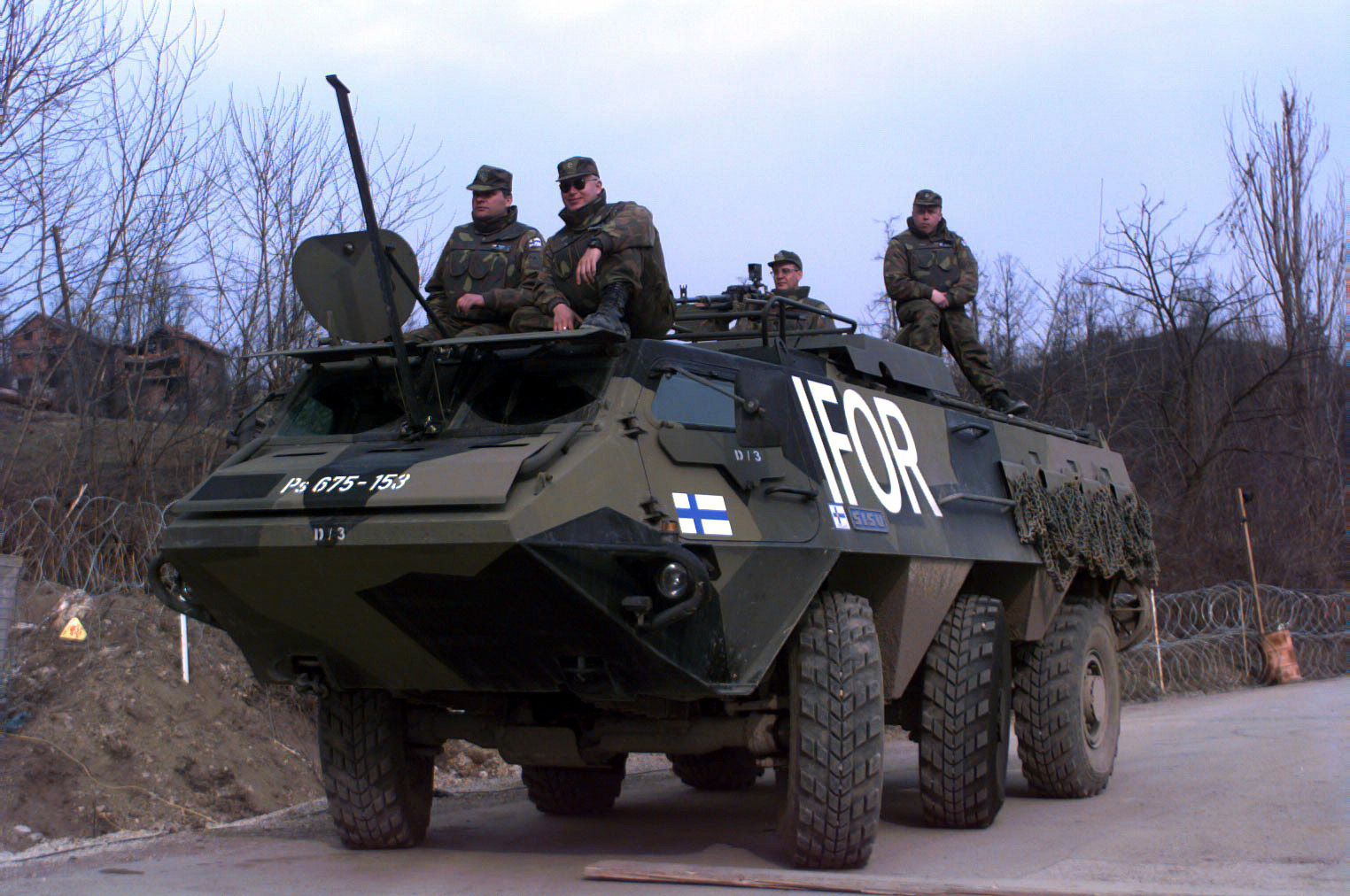
Sisu XA-180 series military vehicle

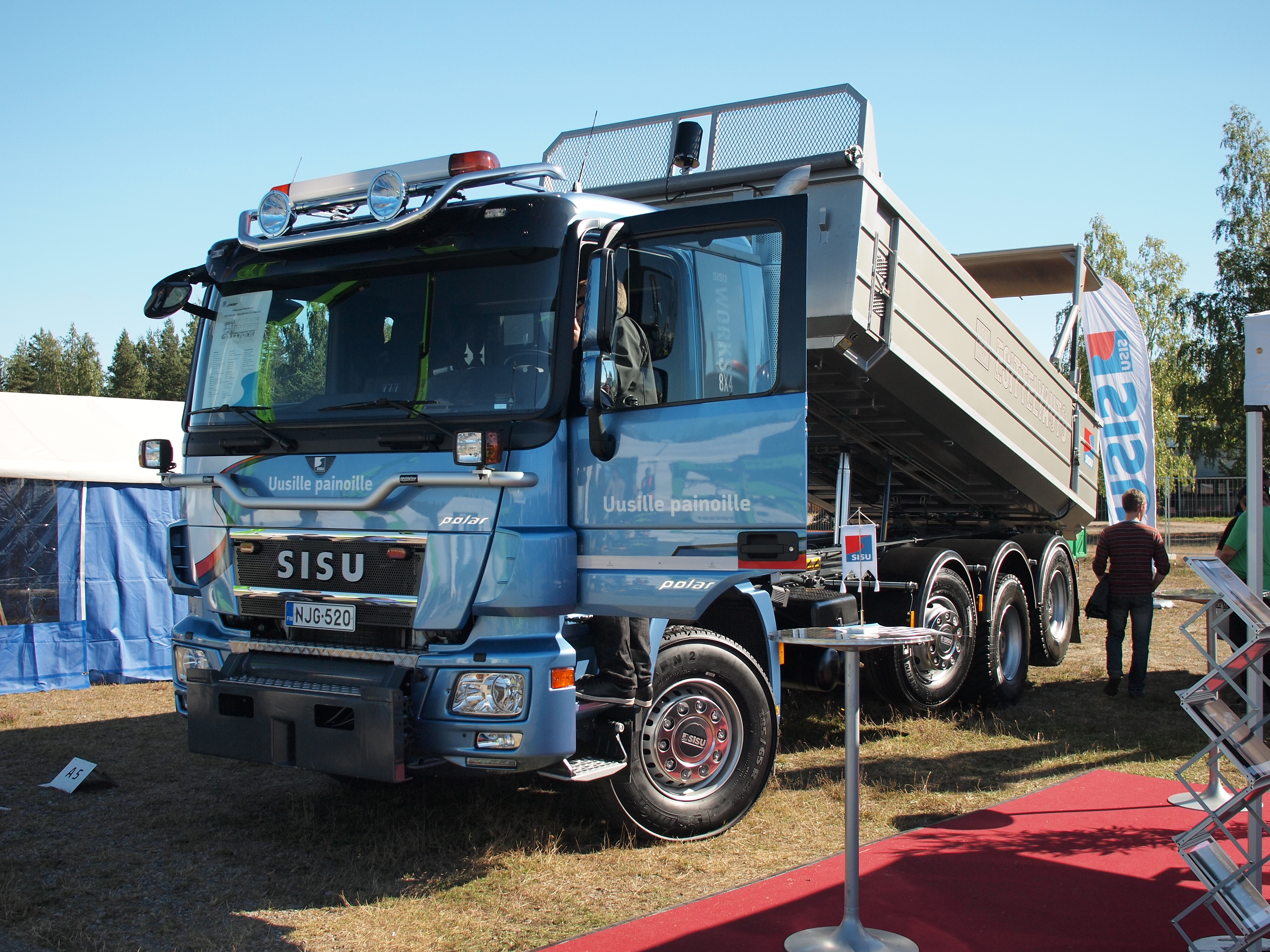
Sisu Polar Works DK16M

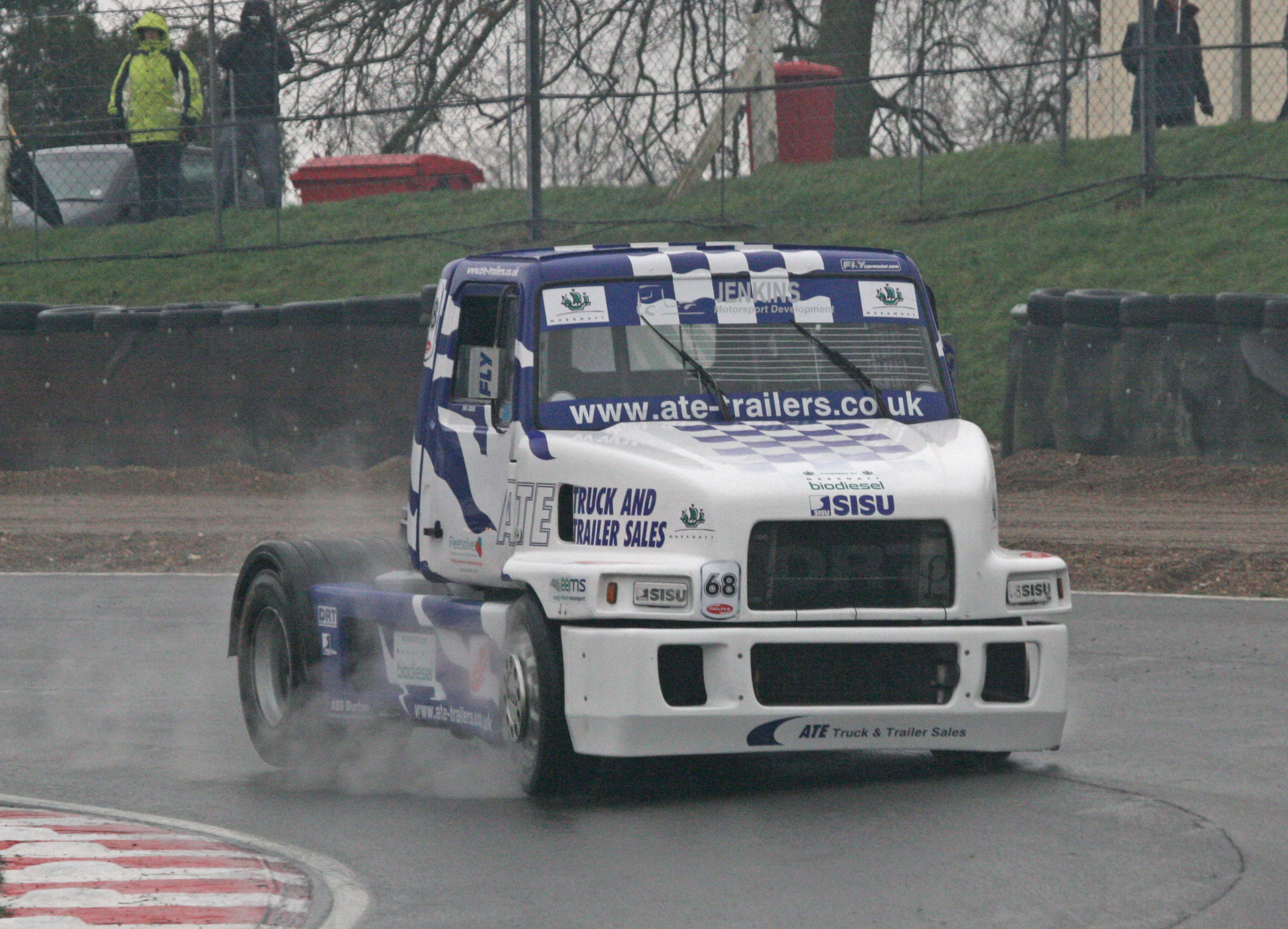
Sisu racing truck

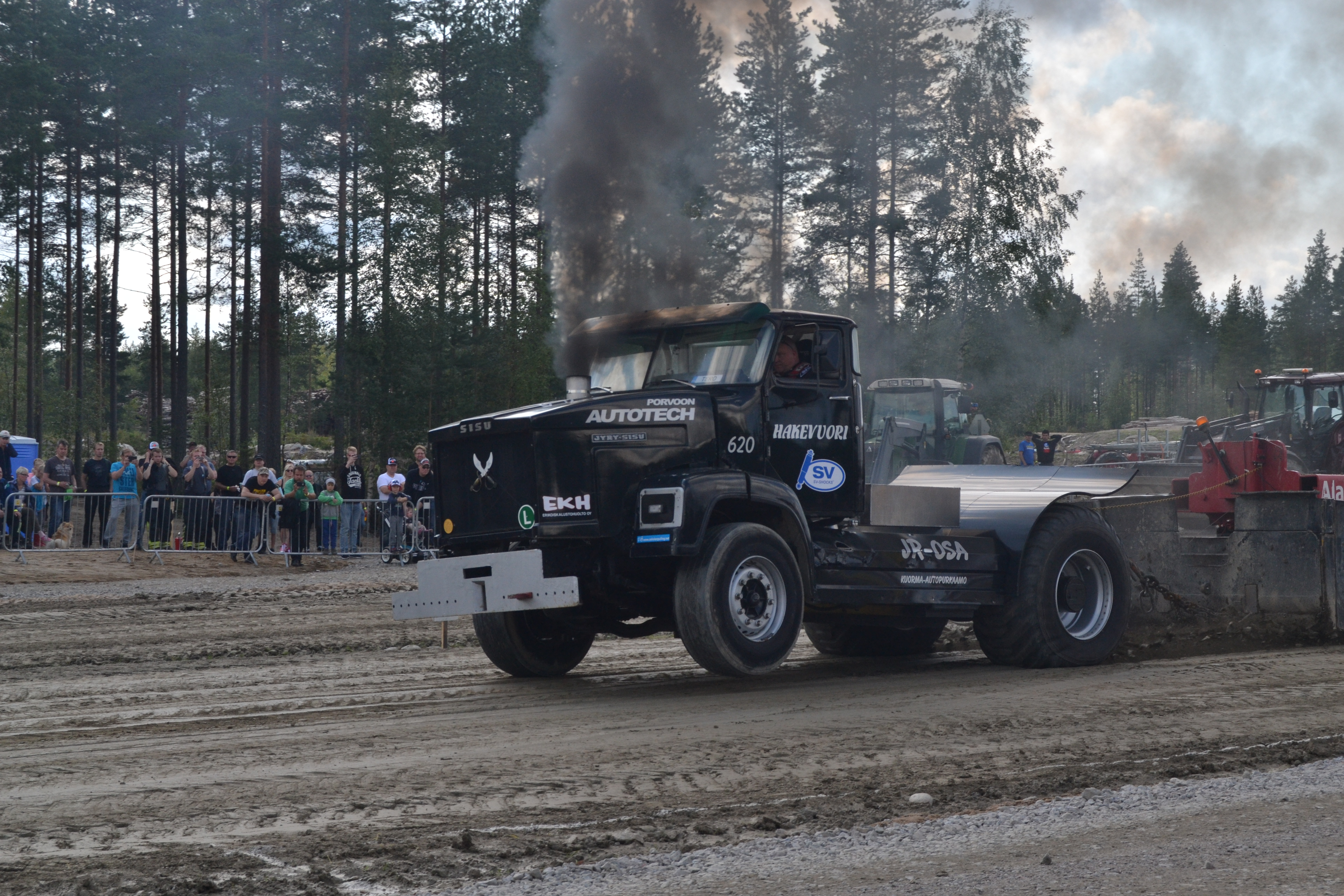
Sisu truck power pulling

== See also ==
- Patria Pasi
- Patria
- Advanced XA-series successor

== Sources ==
- Blomberg, Olli (2006). Suomalaista Sisua vuodesta 1931 – Monialaosaajasta kuorma-autotehtaaksi [Finnish Sisu since 1931 – From multi-industrial expert to lorry factory] (in Finnish). Karis: Oy Sisu Auto Ab. ISBN 952-91-4918-2.
- Mäkipirtti, Markku (2011). Sisu. Ajoneuvot Suomessa (in Finnish). Vol. 4 (2. ed.). Tampere: Apali Oy. ISBN 978-952-5877-05-2.
