= Sisu K-50SS =

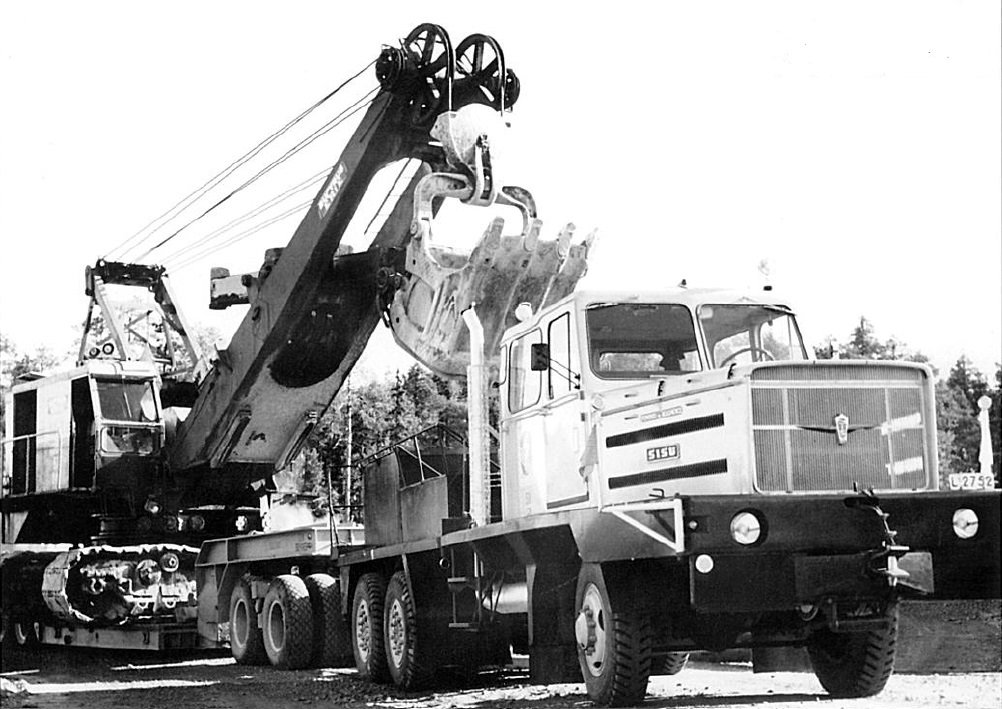
- Sisu K-50SS hauling Bucyrus-Erie 88-B excavator.

Overview
- Manufacturer: Oy Suomen Autoteollisuus Ab
- Production: 1961
- Assembly: Karis, Finland
- Designer: Pentti E. Lehtinen, Kalevi Kakko and Olavi Karhu

Body and chassis
- Layout: 6×6

Powertrain
- Engine: Rolls-Royce C6TFL; 223 kW /2100 1/min; 1070 Nm /1300 1/min
- Transmission: 3-speed main gearbox; 2-speed transfer case; torque multiplier

Dimensions
- Wheelbase: 4 700 + 1 575 mm
- Length: 9 700 mm
- Width: 3 200 mm
- Height: 3 570 mm
- Kerb weight: 19 300 kg

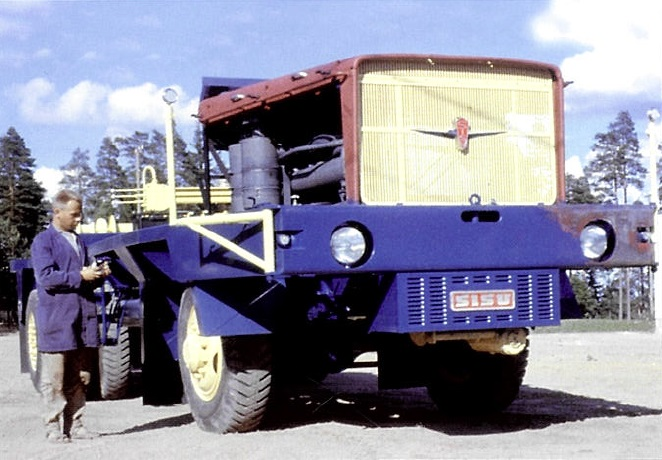
The K-50SS at construction phase, still without cabin.

Sisu K-50SS is a six-wheel-driven ballast tractor made by the Finnish heavy vehicle producer Suomen Autoteollisuus (SAT). The vehicle can generate a 388 kN drawing force and it was used for pulling flatbed trailers.

Only one unit was produced in 1961 and it is the largest roadworthy motor vehicle ever built in the Nordic countries.

== Development ==
K-50SS was developed under assignment of Kemijoki Oy, which ordered at the end of 1959 two 6×6-driven heavy haulers for moving over 1 000 tonnes weighing transformers and other heavy components on flatbed trailers. The initial idea was having two units, of which one would have been used for trailer pulling meanwhile the other one would have pushed the trailer from behind. The vehicles were also planned to be used separately serving on power plant construction sites all over Finland.

SAT had previously produced six heavy Sisu K-36 earthmovers and the know-how was utilised in the engineering work. The first unit was ready in spring 1961, just 1.5 year after the assignment. However, Kemijoki cancelled the order of the other K-50SS and the produced vehicle remained unique.

== Technical data ==
=== Engine ===
The vehicle is powered by Rolls-Royce C6TFL turbocharged 6-cylinder in-line, four-stroke diesel engine. Its 223-kW (300 hp) output is 43% and 1 070 Nm torque 56% higher compared to the standard naturally aspirated type. The cylinder bore is 130.2 mm and stroke 152.2 mm. The compression ratio is 14:1. The engine is fitted with an air-start system.

=== Transmission and chassis ===
The hydraulic Rolls-Royce BF 11500Ms230 torque multiplier has three steps. The three-step main gearbox is made by Foden. The power is divided between the front axle and two rear axles by a differential inside the ZF VG-800-4V1 transfer case. The mechanism includes disengaging possibility of the front-wheel-drive for transition drive; then also the hydraulic clutch can be passed by a mechanical connection.

The maximum ratio passes nearly 65 000 Newton circumferential force on each wheel.

The Kirkstall-made driven axles are equipped with interlockable differentials. The torque between the rear axles is divided by a longitudinal differential.

The chassis is constructed in a similar manner as in locomotives; the solution was re-used in 1990s when the company produced Sisu Mammut and Bambino earthmovers for the Swedish mining company LKAB.

=== Cabin ===
The large cabin is fitted with two beds and a small kitchen.

== Usage and characteristics ==
The K-50SS was used for heavy hauling in North Finnish hydroelectric power plant construction sites.

The 19 300 kg weighing vehicle could be further loaded by extra concrete weights up to 52 000 kg total weight in order to improve the tyre grip.

The hydraulic torque multiplier enables passing torque to the wheels when the vehicle is standing still, enabling a smooth start. The maximum speed with the highest ratio is 10 km/h; the maximum speed during transition drive is 55 km/h. The hydraulic clutch can be used for decelerating.

According to the contemporary drivers and other people who were involved, the vehicle is easy to drive and it has always fulfilled the expectations given to it.

The vehicle cost 21 million marks in the early 1960s and it has only run 43 000 km till 2010. The K-50SS is the all-time largest individual roadworthy automobile unit produced in the Nordic countries, without a tipper or other superstructures. Larger vehicles have been built but not homologated to be used on public roads.

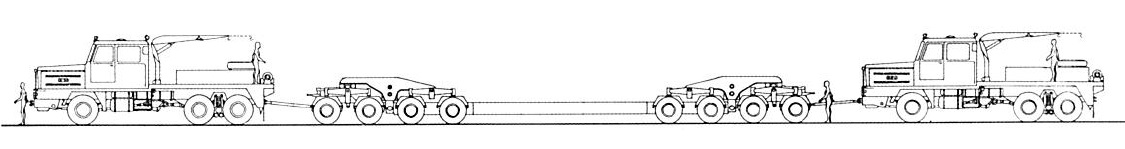
The initial transportation solution plan: one K-50SS pulling while another one is pushing.

== Current status ==
When coming to 21st century, the K-50SS was not in active use any more but stored in a garage at Pirttikoski power plant. It was restored to its original outfit little by little and presented in various vintage vehicle meetings, until Kemijoki Oy gave the Sisu to Oulu Automobile Museum in 2006.

== Sources ==
- Blomberg, Olli. Suomalaista Sisua vuodesta 1931 – Monialaosaajasta kuorma-autotehtaaksi [Finnish Sisu since 1931 – From multi-industrial expert to lorry factory] (in Finnish). Karis: Oy Sisu Auto Ab. ISBN 952-91-4918-2.
