= SWS (trolleybus) =

Overview
- Manufacturer: Oy Suomen Autoteollisuus Ab; Oy Wiima Ab; Oy Strömberg Ab

Body and chassis
- Chassis: body-on-frame

Powertrain
- Engine: Deutz diesel 50 kW
- Capacity: 36 passenger seats; 34 standing places
- Power output: max.: 200 kW; nominal: 110 kW
- Transmission: electric / diesel-electric

Dimensions
- Length: 11 730 mm
- Width: 2 500 mm
- Height: 3 150 mm
- Curb weight: 12 000 kg

SWS is a hybrid trolleybus prototype that was developed and produced by three Finnish companies Suomen Autoteollisuus (SAT), Wiima and Strömberg in 1979.

The Helsinki City Transport (HKL) ordered the prototype to gain experience for the future public transportation strategy for city of Helsinki. The trolleybus got its power from the overhead wires, but for wireless parts it had a diesel generator as a power source. The prototype contained advanced technology.

The SWS prototype participated in COST 303 project in 1985 among other corresponding prototypes. As a part of the project, SWS was shipped to Belgium, where it served for half year in city of Ghent.

Eventually, trolleybus transport was seen too expensive compared to the conventional diesel option, and therefore the City of Helsinki decided to discontinue the trolleybus service and replace it by diesel buses. The SWS trolleybus was kept for possible further investigation.

== Background ==
In 1970 the Helsinki City Transport (HKL) suggested the city council to give up with trolleybus transportation. Instead, the council suggested the city board to extend the trolleybus network. The city transport committee calculated that the planned extensions would demand 70 vehicles. Based on the quotations HKL got, they decided to lease for trials Soviet made ZiU trolleybuses, for which they had got the cheapest offer. The vehicles arrived in February 1973 and they were taken to Wiima factory for converting them to meet the Finnish requirements. The test transportation began in May and continued until November, when the trolleybuses were returned to Soviet Union by rail.

The city had received offers for new equipment from different producers, but as the city board did not budget any funds for the project, it remained frozen. The transport committee decided to end the operation by the old vehicles; the trolleybus service, that had begun in the 1940s, was ended in June 1974. In the same month the committee authorised HKL to order 17 trolleybuses and three domestically produced prototypes, if the city board grants the needed funds, which, however, did not happen. HKL sent again inquiries to 14 trolleybus producers in December 1976. In 1977 February the committee made the decision to restart the trolleybus traffic at latest beginning of 1979 and extend it during the following year. A contract of one domestically produced SWS-trolleybus prototype was signed off in December 1977.

== Construction ==
The project was carried out in co-operation between three companies: heavy vehicle and bus chassis producer Suomen Autoteollisuus, bus coach builder Wiima and Strömberg, which was specialised on electromechanical products. The prototype name SWS comes from the initials of the three companies. The project target was to develop a trolleybus which would suit to the circumstances of Helsinki and to gain knowledge for the future public transport strategy.

SAT supplied the Sisu BT-69-based chassis. It was equipped with axles and steering system but without engine and gearbox. The driven axle is double reduction type because of the high revolution speed of the electrical motor.

The propulsion system was supplied by Strömberg. A main inverter transforms the direct current supplied from the wires to alternating current for the drive motor. The motor speed is adjusted by changing the alternating current frequency and voltage. The main inverter is also equipped with a possibility for transferring the braking energy back to the grid. The drive motor is asynchronous type and the maximum revolution speed is 4300 1/min. The alternative power source is located in the rear end of the vehicle and it consists of a 50-kW Deutz diesel engine and a 40-kW three-phase generator. The trolley poles are lowered and lifted automatically. The vehicle is also equipped with a 380-volt auxiliary inverter that supplies power for the air compressor, steering servo, ventilating fans and other systems.

The coachwork and final assembly was done by Wiima. The bodywork is mainly a standard citybus coach, apart from the structural requirements of the electrical devices, interior heating system and drive motor cooling system.

The prototype required a special permit for service as the rear axle weight exceeded the allowed 10 tonnes. The reason for the heavy weight was the diesel generator unit.

== Tests ==
The prototype was handed over to HKL in April 1979 after which the tests started. In the following June it was demonstrated in an UITP congress at Finlandia Hall, where it got a lot of attention. The trolleybus was taken to service to line 14. Although HKL asked again inquiries for new trolleybuses in 1980, no decisions of new vehicles were made, and in 1983 it was decided to extend the prototype testing period until the spring of 1985, when the future of trolleybus traffic shall be decided. The prototype was used last time in February 1985 when it was decommissioned from service.

In March 1985 the SWS prototype participated in COST 303 project together with nine other trolleybuses: Van Hool/ACEC AG 280T, Daimler-Benz/Bosch/Dornier/Varta 0 305 8, Daimler-Benz/AEG 0 305 GTD, MAN/Siemens 240 H, Renault/Traction CEM Oerlikon/Alstom Atlantique ER 100H/ER 100R, Renault/TREGIE/Traction CEM Oerlikon/SAFT ER180H, Renault/Traction CEM Oerlikon/Alstom Atlantique PER 1 80H, Mauri/Marelli Mauri and FIAT/IVEVO/Marel FIAT CNR-Iveco 471 BM. Every vehicle was tested by the same equipment and personnel from ATM, Italy, in order to ensure comparable results. The vehicle performance, energy consumption, noise level and other characteristics were measured. The AC motor technology used in SWS was unique at its time and Strömberg got substantially publicity for its solution. The prototype was shipped in the following autumn to Antwerp, Belgium. It was driven from the harbour by its own power unit to Ghent where it served the local city transport company MIVG. The end summit of the COST project was held in Brussels and SWS was shown on display in Gent together with the other participating vehicles. SWS returned to Finland after the event.

== Characteristics ==
The SWS characteristics were deeply analysed during and at the end of the testing period, when it had done 80 000 km. In the point of view of the driver, the performance is good and partly better than with a diesel bus. The only additional effort compared to a diesel bus comes from minding of the poles. The electrical braking system is efficient, and therefore the lifetime of the service brakes is longer. The drive motor at the rear axle is excessively noisy due to vibrations; the same issue concerns on the diesel engine. The heating system and main inverter cooling would need a further development. While the diesel generator ensured the power supply, the extra weight was seen as a drawback. The old and worn cables above the streets caused problems during service.

Characteristics	SWS trolleybus	Diesel bus
Kerb weight	12 000 kg	10 500 kg
Front axle weight	6 300 kg	5 600 kg
Rear axle weight	11 400 kg	10 400 kg
Total weight	17 700 kg	16 000 kg
Output: Max. output; Hourly power; Continuous power	200 kW; 132 kW; 110 kW	150 kW
Top speed	60 km/h	80 km/h
Max. acceleration: empty; full loaded	2.2 m/s² 1.5 m/s²	1.9 m/s² 1.2 m/s²
Noise level, external	75 dB (w/o diesel use)	85 dB
Noise level, internal: Front; Rear	(w/o diesel use); 68 dB; 74 dB	72 dB; 82 dB
Energy consumption: with regeneration; w/o regeneration	1.7 kWh/km; 2.3 kWh/km	0.5 L/km

== Cost summary ==
An analysis made in 1979 estimated that trolleybuses will become more common worldwide and cheaper by the end of the 1980s due to larger production series. Another assumption was that diesel oil price will increase faster compared to electricity price.

The situation was reviewed again in 1985. The first forecast had not come true; the price ratio was the same as few years before. The second one proved correct, but the price development had not been sufficient to make trolleybus option competitive. The annual costs of trolleybus were still about 10% higher compared to a corresponding diesel bus, although the difference was narrower than before. It was calculated that if the same trend continues, the diesel and trolley buses will be at the same operating cost level by year 2000.

Moreover, the trolleybus cable network in Helsinki was badly worn and its renewal would have demanded over 70 million marks more than replacing the old diesel buses by newer ones. It was also pointed out that the contemporary technology, originated from the 1940s and 1950s without significant differences, had not solved the problems related to cable crossings and curves. Other counter arguments for trolley bus traffic were bad condition of streets, as a trolleybus requires a smoother surface, and the existing tram cable network, which made it difficult to build new trolley cables.

The outcome was that there was no economic basis to continue the trolleybus traffic in Helsinki. At the same time it was decided to keep the SWS prototype for possible future investigation.
