= Solid Wood Soldiers =

- Founded: 1990; 36 years ago
- Founding location: Snake River Correctional Institution, Oregon, United States
- Years active: 1990's–present
- Territory: Texas
- Ethnicity: White American
- Activities: Drug trafficking, Murder, extortion,assaults

The Solid Wood Soldiers (SWS, Stupid Woods or The Wolfpack) is a neo-Nazi prison gang and organized crime syndicate based in the state of Texas. It is primarily known for its involvement in crimes such as drug trafficking, assault, murder, and racketeering, as well as its strong ties to other white supremacist groups.

== Symbology and identification ==
The Solid Wood Soldiers commonly display tattoos featuring the initials SWS, with the two Ss often stylized as lightning bolts to signify membership and allegiance to the gang. These initials are frequently accompanied by an image of a bear claw containing the number 4, and sometimes the letters HCRL. Other symbols employed by the group include the number four—occasionally represented using Latin or Roman numerals—which corresponds to the four principles of "Honor," "Courage," "Respect," and "Loyalty." Additionally, the gang utilizes the 14/10 numeric symbol, referencing the fourteen words slogan. This symbolism reflects the gang’s creed: "Unity is the only solution to the white man's revolution."

== Arrests ==
Between July and August 2013, twelve gang members were detained during an anti-racketeering operation in Vidor, Texas. The suspects were also involved in other crimes, including methamphetamine trafficking and murder in the Eastern District of Texas.

In January 2014, Tanner Lynn Bourque, a.k.a. “Two Shoes” or “Hitman,” pleaded guilty to a 2011 murder in Liberty County, Texas and to aiding drug trafficking. He was sentenced to life in federal prison.

On January 19, 2023, the Orange County Narcotics Division, along with other agencies, executed a search warrant against Christopher Paul Kirbow, a gang member. During the operation in the city of Vidor, Orange County, Texas, law enforcement seized an undetermined amount of methamphetamine, ecstasy, hydrocodone, and drug distribution paraphernalia.
