= Sisu SA-110 =

Overview
- Manufacturer: Oy Sisu-Auto Ab
- Also called: "Kevyt-Masi" (Light Masi)
- Production: 1986
- Assembly: Hämeenlinna, Finland

Body and chassis
- Class: small off-road lorry
- Body style: platform lorry

Powertrain
- Engine: Deutz BF 6 L 913 or Valmet 411 DSJ

Dimensions
- Wheelbase: 3,400 mm
- Length: 6,500 mm
- Width: 2,340 mm
- Height: 2,840 mm

Sisu SA-110 is a prototype of a light two-axle off-road lorry made by the Finnish heavy vehicle manufacturer Oy Sisu-Auto Ab in 1986. Total six pieces were made. The vehicle was partly armoured.

The initiative for the vehicle development came from the Finnish Defence Forces which sent an inquiry for a light off-road lorry to Sisu-Auto in April 1983. At the time the Defence Forces was planning to purchase of 1,000 such vehicles. Sisu-Auto handed over a prototype for testing at the end of year 1986.

== Technical data ==
Sisu-Auto opted two engine types: Deutz BF 6 L 913 and Valmet 411 DSJ. The latter one is in use in four vehicles. The gearbox is ZF-S5-35/2 which was connected to a reduction gear unit of Sisu's own design. The axles are portal type and they are equipped with disc brakes and CTI system.

Unlike in Masi, the frame is stiff and the high travel of wheels is only carried out by suspension. The front axle is sprung with coil springs, the rear axle with parabolic leaf springs.

== Characteristics ==
The tests showed that from its mobility the vehicle was the best in the market. The engine started in -25 °C. SA-110 went in 60 cm deep snow and 75–85 cm deep water without any problems. It could climb 30° hills and it drove over a pile of gravel with an angle of 25° with ease. Due to these characteristics, the vehicle was called ″Unimog killer″.

The deficiencies were a too small engine power and a too low torque and also a too high noise level; the highest measured value in the cabin was 88 dB. The 9.4-metre turning circle was regarded too large and the ratios of the 3rd and 4th gear were criticised.

The too high price of the vehicle was one reason why the serial production was not started. It cost 85% of the Masi and 50% of the price of Pasi.

== Sources ==
- Blomberg, Olli (2006). Suomalaista Sisua vuodesta 1931 – Monialaosaajasta kuorma-autotehtaaksi (in Finnish). Karis: Oy Sisu Auto Ab. ISBN 952-91-4918-2.
- Mäkipirtti, Markku (2006). Puolustusvoimien moottoriajoneuvot 1960–2000 (in Finnish). Tampere: Apali Oy. ISBN 978-952-5026-50-4.
