= List of dump truck manufacturers =

List of dump truck manufacturers.

Manufacturer	Active/Defunct	Country	Example model
Ashok Leyland	Active	India	8x4 Tipper
BelAZ	Active	Belarus	MOAZ-75035, BELAZ-7547
BEML India Ltd	Active	India	BH35-2
Isuzu	Active	Japan	NKR 62/45-150 TIPPER
Perlini	Active	Italy	DC 13 313A, DP 705 WD
Mitsubishi	Active	Japan	7C15, 7C18
Neustar	Active	Canada	
Kress Corporation	Active	US	Kress 200CIII
Scania AB	Active	Sweden	P420B10X4*6NA
International Motors	Active	US	HV 509, HV 609
Ural Automotive Plant	Active	Russia	Ural 55571-3521-16
Renault	Active	France	C440 P8x4

== Tractor units ==
- Ashok Leyland
- BelAZ
- BEML India Ltd
- CAMC
- Chevy
- DAF CF, 95 XF
- Davis Trailer & Equipment
- Dongfeng Liuqi
- Ford
- GAZ
- GMC
- HEPCO
- Hino Motors (Toyota)
- Leader Trucks
- International
- Isuzu
- Iveco Eurotrakker, Eurostar
- KamAZ
- Kenworth
- Kress Corporation:200CII.
- Mack
- MAN
- MAZ
- Mahindra
- Mercedes-Benz Actros, Axor
- Micro-Vett
- Mitsubishi Fuso Truck and Bus Corporation
- MoAZ
- Peterbilt
- Perlini
- Renault Trucks
- ROMAN
- Scania AB 220, 340, 360, 460
- SISU
- ST Kinetics
- Sterling Trucks
- Tata Motors
- Tata Daewoo
- TBEI
- Tonar
- UD
- Ural Automotive Plant
- Volvo FH12 and Volvo FM12

== Semi-trailer ==
- Schmitz Cargobull
- Seri Zenith
- Voltrailer
- Wielton

== See also ==
- Dump truck
- Tractor unit
- Semi-trailer and semi-trailer truck
- List of American truck manufacturers
