= Bell Group =

- Type: Public
- Traded as: ASX: BLL
- Predecessor: Western Australian Worsted & Woollen Mills; Bell Brothers
- Founded: 1973
- Defunct: 1991
- Successor: Bond Corporation
- Headquarters: Perth, Australia

Bell Group was an Australian company. After being sold to Bond Corporation and asset stripped it was placed in administration. It was the subject of Australia's longest running and most expensive legal case with its liquidator taking action against Bell's lenders.

== History ==
In 1973, Robert Holmes à Court's Western Australian Worsted & Woollen Mills acquired Bell Brothers through a reverse takeover.

In 1979, Bell Group made a bid for Ansett Transport Industries but was defeated by News Limited and TNT.

In January 1982 Associated Communications Corporation was acquired. During 1982, Bell Group took stakes in Rolls-Royce (4%) and Portland Cement and made an unsuccessful bid for the Herald & Weekly Times. Later that year it acquired TVW Enterprises owners of television stations TVW-7 in Perth and SAS 10 in Adelaide.

In 1987, Bell Group purchased a stake in Pioneer Concrete and made a second unsuccessful bid for the Herald & Weekly Times with News Limited prevailing. Bell Group took ownership of The West Australian, Perth's main daily newspaper.

Australian Consolidated Investments, was previously known as Bell Resources between 1984 and 1990 and prior to that the company was known as Wigmores between 1938 and 1984.

In 1983, Bell Group bought Perth Caterpillar distributor Wigmores, and renamed it Bell Resources Limited. Through the ACC group, BRL gained control of Bass Strait oil and gas explorer, Weeks Petroleum which owned a 2.5% royalty share in the Esso-BHP consortium.

In 1985, BRL acquired 13% of U.S. mining company Asarco for $140 million and made an unsuccessful bid for Perth utility Fremantle Gas & Coke Company. Also in 1985, BRL made its biggest and most daring bid to date for control of resources and steelmaking giant BHP, which was Australia's largest company. Before the deal was finalised the following year, Elders IXL took a 20% stake in BHP, for $2 billion. In turn, BHP purchased $1 billion of Elders preference shares. The deal later resulted in action against Elders executives, including chairman John Elliott by the corporate regulator. BRL also spent US$800 million, to acquire 9.6% of Texaco stock.

By the time of the October 1987 international stockmarket crash, Bell Group had accumulated assets that were valuable but not generating revenue sufficient to cover debts. Holmes à Court's family company, Heytesbury Holdings, at the time owned 43% of Bell Group, which in turn owned 40% of the cash rich Bell Resources. However, Bell Resources was not able to buy its parent, due to share raids being made on Bell Resources by Kerry Packer, Adelaide Steamship Company (under John Spalvins) and IEL (Ron Brierley). Merrill Lynch withdrew its $1 billion line of credit facility, meaning that the parent could not acquire its subsidiary and thereby access the money.

Holmes à Court initially disposed of some Perth properties before accepting a joint takeover by Bond Corporation and the State Government Insurance Commission, in which each acquired a 19.9% stake in Bell Group. Holmes à Court retained 6% of Bell Group and received $340 million from the sale. Bond Corporation was subsequently forced to bid for other shares in Bell with the result that it ended up with a majority shareholding of 68% of Bell Group. Bond Corporation then proceeded to strip $500 million from Bell Resources in an effort to prop up its own debts. The asset stripping included siphoning $1.2 billion from Bell Resources through back-to-back loans, breaching the corporations act and with chairman Alan Bond later sent to prison, transfer of ownership of newspaper holdings into Bond Media and disposal of certain assets including TVW-7.

In 1990, Bell Resources was renamed Australian Consolidated Investments Limited. Bond Corporation entered a scheme of arrangement in 1991, with receivers taking charge of the Bell Group.

In July 2003, liquidator Ferrier Hodgson began legal proceedings against 20 of the Bell Group's lenders including the Commonwealth Bank, National Australia Bank and Westpac, claiming they should have known the dire financial situation the company was in prior to its collapse. Hearings took place over 404 days between July 2003 and September 2006. The judgement which found the banks liable was delivered in April 2009 with the banks ordered to pay $1.58 billion.

After a series of appeals and counter appeals, in 2013 the banks agreed to settle with a pool of $1.75 billion to be distributed to creditors. The case was the longest running and most expensive in Australian history. After a further legal case between the creditors as to how the settlement should be distributed, in August 2020, the settlement was approved by the Supreme Court of Western Australia.
