= Bell Brothers (Western Australia) =

Company in Western Australia

- Industry: Aggregates; Automotive; Civil engineering Mining engineering Transport
- Founded: 1917
- Founder: WJ Bell
- Headquarters: Guildford
- Area served: Western Australia
- Subsidiaries: Bell Basic Industries; Bell Freightlines; Western Transport

Bell Brothers was a diversified company with interests in the aggregates, automotive, civil engineering, heavy heads, mining engineering and transport industries. Primarily based in Western Australia, it also had smaller interests in other states of Australia.

== History ==
WJ Bell arrived with his family from Scotland in 1910. in 1917, he began carting clay with a motor truck purchased in 1924 . He was joined by sons David, Robert & Alex as they finished school. A mechanical shovel was purcahed in the late 1930s and they moved into earthmoving business, 38,000 tons of slag carted for Melville Park and huge quantities of sand for Perth City Council.

In 1937, the first diesel truck was purchased, a Diamond T followed by in 1938 by three Leylands. During World War II, it worked on many airports including Broome, Carnarvon, Derby, Onslow, Pearce, Port Hedland and Wyndham.

It went on to become one of the largest transport companies in the state. In 1946 it commenced mining coal in Collie. As well as operating trucks that moved goods to and from ships docking at Fremantle, by 1950 it had commenced hauling manganese to Meekatharra and iron ore from Koolyanobbing to Southern Express for onward movement by rail services.

A 64-acre headquarters was established in Guildford in 1952. In 1954 it became a distributor for ERF and Mack Trucks. In the late 1950s it was responsible for the construction of RAAF Base Learmonth briefly operating an Avro Anson aeroplane.

On 9 September 1965 Bell Brothers was listed on the Sydney, Melbourne and Perth stock exchanges. In July 1969, it diversified into aggregates purchasing Swan Quarries which became Bell Basic Industries. In 1969, it purchased the first corporate jet in Australia, a Hawker Siddeley 125.

In 1972 Western Transport of Queensland was purchased with 300 trucks followed by the Queensland Tyre Re-treading Company. In 1973 Bell Brothers was acquired by Robert Holmes à Court's Albany Woollen Mills, becoming part the Bell Group in July 1976.

After the Bell Group was taken over by Bond Corporation and the State Government Insurance Office, Bell Brothers was sold to Boral in 1988. In May 1991 the transport business was sold by Boral to Heytesbury, the family company of Holmes à Court's widow Janet.
