= Sisu Polar =

Truck model by Finnish manufacturer Sisu Auto

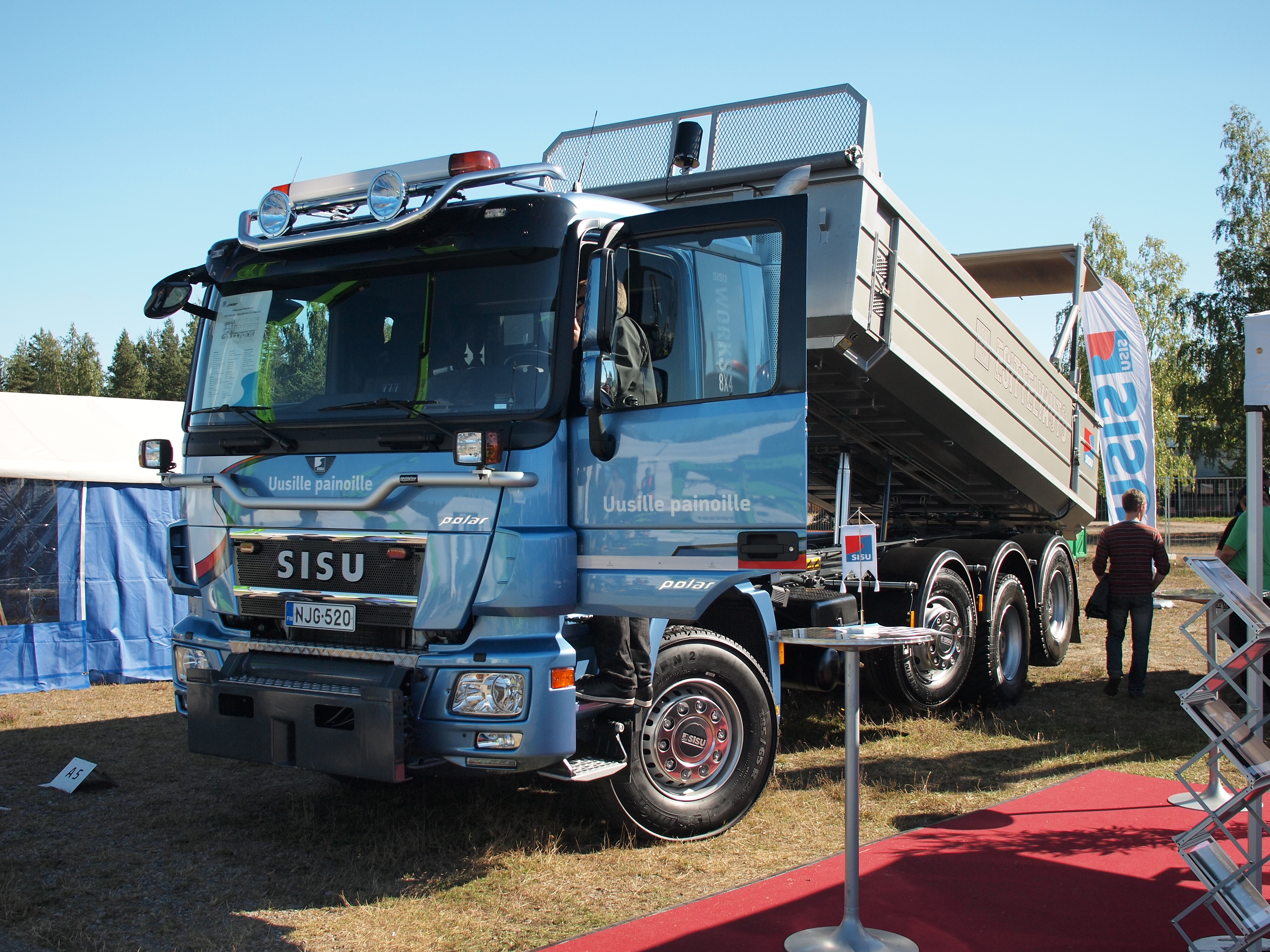
- Sisu Polar Works.

Overview
- Manufacturer: Oy Sisu Auto Ab
- Also called: DK12M; DK16M
- Production: 2011–present
- Model years: 2012–present
- Assembly: Raseborg, Finland

Body and chassis
- Layout: Standard: 6×2, 6×4, 8×2, 8×4, 10×2, 10×4; Off-road: 6×4, 6×6, 8×8
- Related: Mercedes-Benz Actros

Powertrain
- Engine: Mercedes-Benz V6, V8 or L6; 310–460 kW ^{→ table}
- Transmission: MB PowerShift G-280, automatic; MB Telligent G240, manual; Eaton Fuller RTLO 20918, non-synchronous manual

Sisu Polar is a truck model series produced by the Finnish heavy vehicle producer Sisu Auto. It came into the market in 2011 and the main applications are earthmovers, logging trucks, road maintenance vehicles, mobile cranes and heavy machinery hauliers which are fully equipped in the factory. The series includes two main variants DK12M and DK16M. The number of axles is 3, 4 or 5. Mercedes-Benz supplies some key components; cabins and engines in particular.

== Applications ==
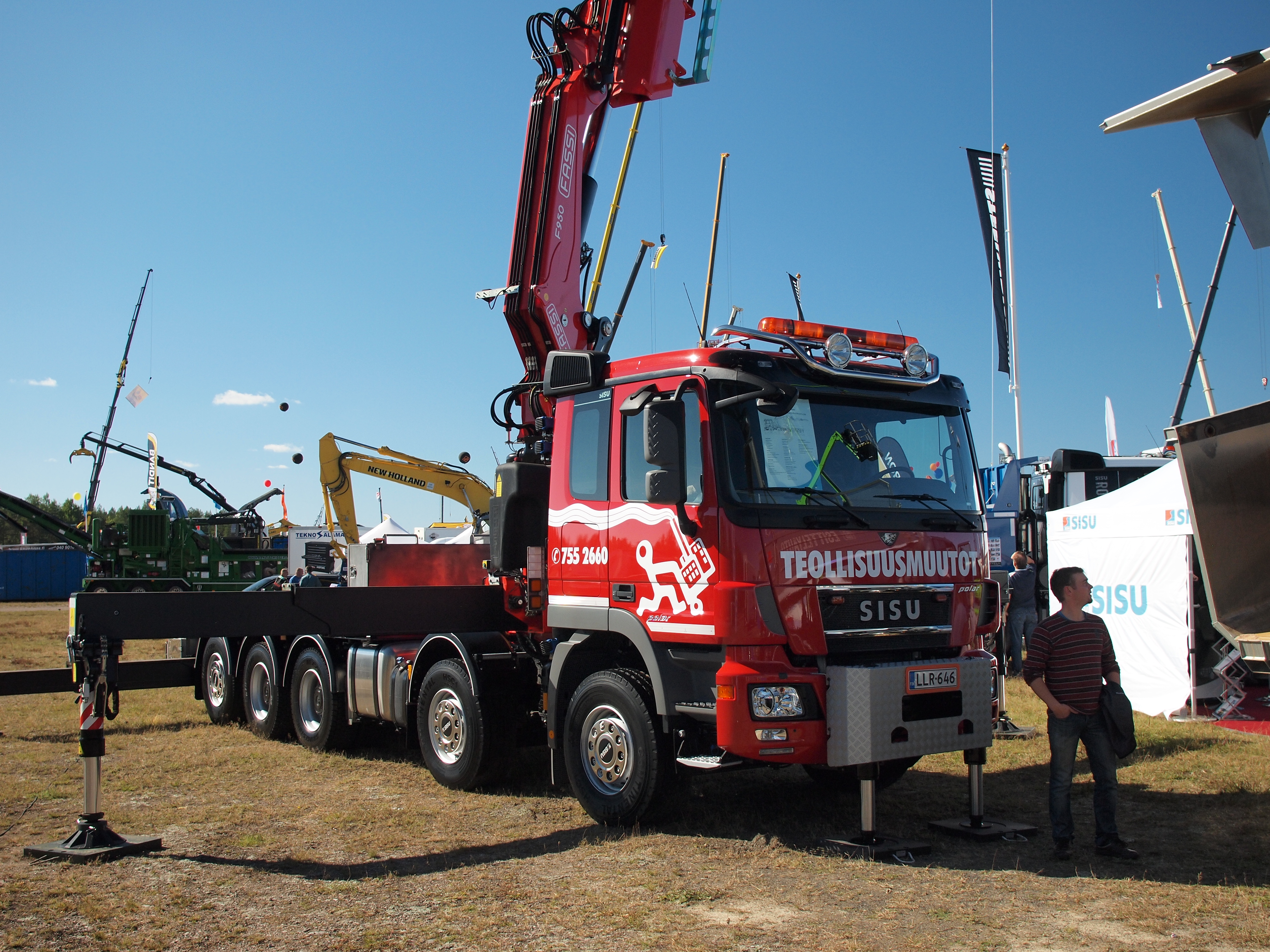
Sisu Crane

- Sisu Rock — earth mover
- Sisu Roll — hook loader
- Sisu Timber — logging truck
- Sisu Works — road maintenance vehicle
- Sisu Crane — mobile crane
- Sisu Carrier — heavy machinery hauler

Sisu Works came first time into market in Polar series.

== Development ==
The previous Sisu-model used Renault cabins, Cummins, Caterpillar, Renault and Mack engines were available depending on model and ZF gearboxes as well as Fuller transmission. When developing of the new series, the company wanted to source components from one partner in order to have a more compact unit and avoid of extra engineering work that was needed for fitting the various components together. Another reason for the one-source policy was improving of the aftermarket operations.

At the time when the new model series was under development, the Sisu vehicles were distributed in Finland by Veho, which also represented Mercedes-Benz trucks. Sisu Auto signed a supply contract with Daimler Trucks AG for cabins, engines and gearboxes. Rumours about the partnership were confirmed when a prototype was spotted in late summer 2010. As the project was revealed and Sisu Auto had gained enough of experience to be confident about the construction, the company decided to announce the new product in the same August.

The complete series was officially launched in Kuljetus 2011 fair in Jyväskylä in May 2011. The Mercedes cabin was styled to Sisu look by industrial designer Jukka Pimiä. The grille with four transversal ribs resemble the preceding model. The main variants are DK12M and DK16M. "K" means a high cabin, the number stands for engine displacement in litres and "M" means forward-control cabin.

An off-road range with three and four axles was launched in January 2014.

== Reception ==
The large portion of parts sourced from Daimler caused such doubts, that Sisu would be Mercedes-Benz Actros with just a different badge. However, the frame and axles differ from those of Mercedes.

Konepörssi magazine tested Sisu Rock earthmover application. The cabin was praised more spacious and easier to access compared to the Renault cabin used in the previous models. Layout of switches was criticised. When the Polar was tested with a trailer, with over 36 tonnes payload and 59.2 tonnes gross weight, performance of the V8 engine and the vehicle behaviour were assessed good.

Polar was selected Truck of the Year in Finland in 2012. The arguments for the selection were mentioned applying modern technology successfully to the Finnish conditions, robust structure and axles, delivering the vehicles ready equipped with the superstructures to the specific purpose and a good component supplier partnership together with a well-covering service network.

== Technical data ==
=== Engine data ===
Engine data	Polar DK12M	Polar DK16M	Polar CM13M	Polar CK16M
Engine make and type	MB OM 501 LA	MB OM 502 LA	MB OM 471	MB OM 473
Description	V6 diesel	V8 diesel	L6 diesel	L6 diesel
European emission standard	Euro V	Euro V	Euro VI	Euro VI
Years in production	2011–2013	2011–2013	2014–	2014–
Displacement	11,950 cm³	15,928 cm³	12,800 cm³	15,600 cm³
Max. output	350 kW /1800 1/min	405 kW or 440 kW /1800 1/min	310 kW, 350 kW or 375 kW /1800 1/min	380 kW, 425 kW or 460 kW /1600 1/min
Max. torque	2,300 Nm /1080 1/min	2,600 Nm or 2,800 Nm /1080 1/min	2,100 Nm, 2,300 Nm or 2,500 Nm /1100 1/min	2,600 Nm, 2,800 Nm or 3,000 Nm /1100 1/min

At early 2013 the company informed that Euro VI engines will be presented in October 2013 and the first production models would be handed over to customers in the second quarter of 2014. Later the introduction has been postponed to early February 2014.

=== Gearbox ===
Two of the gearbox options, the 16-speed PowerShift G-280 automatic gearbox and as well 16-speed Telligent G240, which is manual, come from Daimler. Non-synchronous Eaton Fuller RTLO 20918 with 18 gears is available as a third option.

=== Axles ===
The axles are produced by Sisu Axles. The steering front axles are type FSND-10-P with maximum ten tonnes capacity and disc brakes.

The models with driven tandem axle are equipped with a power disengagement possibility of the posterior axle and the Vanaja lifting tandem system. The previously used mechanical steering of the second steering axle is replaced by an electro-hydraulic steering system.

The off-road models are available with three and four axles; the layouts are 6×4, 6×6 and 8×8. The axles are with single wheels and equipped with CTI system.

=== Frame ===
The frame is available in two different profiles. The more robust version is of 460 mm high C-profile frame, on which all beams and brackets of tipper are directly attached. The key benefit of the solution is a good dumping stability; on the other hand, the high frame limits the possibilities for superstructure modifications. Another, conventional arrangement is made from U-profile and is 300 mm high; a separate subframe with the needed brackets is attached by means of bolts.

=== Cabin ===
The cabin is borrowed from Mercedes-Benz Actros and the earlier model available in three types: normal, extended with bed and a high extended version. The new Euro VI model will have a new cabin which will be available in two basic types: the lower one is 2.3 metres and the higher one 2.5 metres high. Several roof options will be available for both types.

== Sales ==
The initial plan was to grow the production gradually up to 500 units per year of which one third would be exported; the most important export markets were estimated to be Russia, Switzerland and Norway. The Russian market has been expected to focus on logging trucks, Swiss market on five-axle trucks and in Norway the company expects sales in earthmovers. Moreover, Sisu Auto sees potential for mobile cranes in the Central European market.

The actual sales remained low until 2012 – only about 50 Sisu Polars were produced in the whole year.

In April 2013 the company estimated the whole year's sales to reach 200 vehicles. The sales have benefitted from the new Finnish legislation, that allows a total weight of 76 tonnes instead of the previous 60 tonnes for a truck with trailer. The first export market was Norway. In September and October Sisu was the leader in earthmoving trucks of over 25 tonnes in the Finnish market.

The first customer for the early 2014 launched off-road range is the Russian racing team KamAZ-Master which bought it as off-road racing service vehicle.
