= Western Transport =

- Company type: Road Transport
- Founded: 1934
- Founder: Cyril Anderson
- Defunct: 1972
- Fate: Sold
- Headquarters: Toowoomba, Australia

Western Transport was a road transport company that commenced operation in 1934 in Toowoomba, Queensland, Australia.

== Background ==
Founder John Cyril Anderson worked in a family grocery store in Toowoomba, and he purchased a two-ton Studebaker truck in 1934 to bring supplies into the store from Brisbane. Eventually this supply run was expanded to a general carry business venture and by 1936 the operation had increased to four vehicles, becoming Western Transport Pty Ltd.

In 1950 Western Transport acquired Maranoa Transport company and greatly expanded their operating area.

== Overview ==
In its heyday of the 1950s through to the 1970s, Western Transport operated the largest fleet of trucks in Australia, over 500 trucks and trailers in all. The company serviced every mainland state with depots in Brisbane, Sydney, Melbourne, Adelaide, Perth and Darwin and fifty-three Queensland towns.

Through Western Transport, Cyril Anderson was instrumental in starting up the local truck manufacturing company Leader Trucks, having previously had a large shareholding in Mack Trucks Australia.

Western Transport, Anderson Agencies, Maranoa Transport, Westco Motors, Great Western, Wesco Truck Sales and Western Oilfields Trucking were all part of the Western Transport organisation.

In 1972 Western Transport was sold to Bell Brothers of Western Australia.
