= Leader Trucks =

Australian truck manufacturer

- Type: Truck Manufacturer
- Founded: 1972
- Founder: Cyril Anderson
- Defunct: 1984
- Headquarters: Toowoomba, Australia

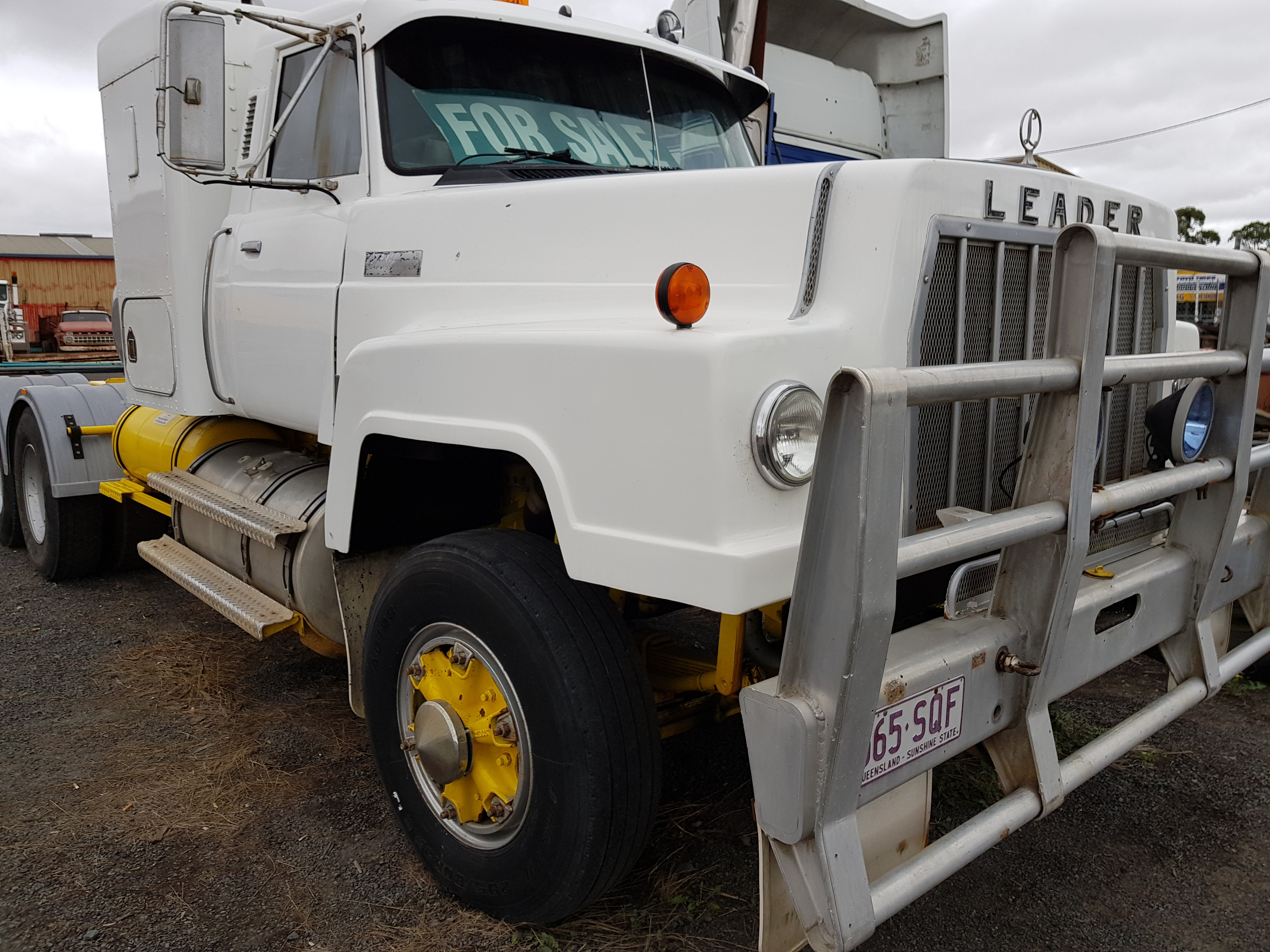
Leader Challenger

Leader Trucks was a truck-manufacturing company based in Toowoomba, Queensland, Australia. It was established as an initiative of Cyril Anderson and Western Transport. Nearly 2,000 trucks (a wide variety from 4-ton to 250-ton) were manufactured between 1972 and 1984.

== Overview ==
Leader found their niche in the heavy transport market and built as a rigid 4x4 and 6x6 configuration for tray, tipper and agitator applications, they offered reliable machines in the industries of earth-moving and off-road construction.

Leader was notable for being the first manufacturer to fit Caterpillar engines to trucks, to fit automatic transmissions to diesel trucks in assembly, and the first truck manufacturer in Australia to offer disc brakes.

== Growth ==
Leader boasted its components to be 80 percent Australian built with only the engine, transmission and steering box imported. By 1980, Leader had sold its 1000th truck in Australia and had also sold trucks to New Zealand, South Africa, Hong Kong, China, Caribbean, Middle East and Indonesia.

== See also ==
- SPA Truck Company
