= Sisu Axles =

Sisu Axles, Inc.
- Native name: Sisu Akselit Oy
- Company type: osakeyhtiö
- Industry: automotive
- Founded: 1995 as a separate company
- Headquarters: Hämeenlinna, Finland
- Key people: Jouni Teppo (Managing director)
- Products: axles for on- and off-road trucks, terminal tractors and military vehicles
- Revenue: ▲€17,749,000 (2023); €13,560,000 (2022)
- Operating income: ▲€2,547,000 (2023); €1,898,000 (2022)
- Number of employees: ▲40 (2023); 37 (2022)
- Parent: Marmon Group
- Website: sisuaxles.com

Sisu Axles, Inc. (Finnish: Sisu Akselit Oy) is a producer of heavy vehicle axles in Hämeenlinna, Finland.

The company's main markets are in heavy truck, terminal tractor and military vehicle axles; the driven axles are exclusively with planetary reduction. Sisu Axles was started when Suomen Autoteollisuus, later Sisu Auto, started their own axle production in Helsinki in 1940s. The production was later transferred to Hämeenlinna and sold to investors. The current owner is American Marmon Group.

== The company ==
Sisu Axles is specialised on highly customised heavy vehicle axles in niché markets. The axles are designated to be used in rough conditions.

The company produces and supplies axles and components for heavy-duty vehicle producers in Finland and other countries. After market services include customer support, advisory and spare parts. The factory is equipped with laboratory for testing of axles at load for engineering purposes.

== Products ==
Sisu Axles' core business are planetary reduction axles but also non-driven steering axles are produced. Both the front and rear axles are for single and multi axle applications. The main segments are heavy-duty trucks for on- and off-road use and also industrial and military applications.

=== Heavy duty truck axles ===
The driven truck axles are with planetary reduction, single axle capacity being 10–14 tonnes for steering and 10–20.5 tonnes for non-steering axles; the tandem configurations for the steering axles are rated to 20–28 tonnes and non-steering 20–41 tonnes. The non-steering axles are also available as tridem configurations with 39–61.5 tonnes. The capacities of steering, non driven axles are between 8 and 12 tonnes. Some non-driven, non-steering axles with a capacity of 13 tonnes are also in the selection. The non-steering axles are with S-cam drum brakes, whereas some of the steering axles are equipped with disc or wedge brakes.

=== Container handling equipment axles ===
The driven axles for the container handling equipment are with planetary reduction. The single non-steering axle capacity is 30–32 tonnes; the tandem applications are rated to 26–41 tonnes. The driven steering axles are with 12–18 tonnes capacity and the non-driven option is only available with 10 tonnes capacity. S-cam and disc brakes are applied on both steering and non-steering axles, the heavier steering driven option being fitted with wedge brakes.

=== Military vehicle axles ===
For military applications the selection includes both conventional rigid axles as well as independent suspension systems, all of them being driven with planetary reduction. Both the steering and non-steering rigid axles are with 10–14 tonnes capacities and the tandem applications with double capacity, 20–28 tonnes. The brakes used on rigid axles are predominantly S-cam type; the heavier steering axles are equipped with wedge brakes. The independent suspension systems are for 6×6, 8×8 and 10×10 layouts with 6 to 8 tonnes capacity per axle. The brakes are either disc or wedge type.

== Applications ==
Examples of present and recent applications.

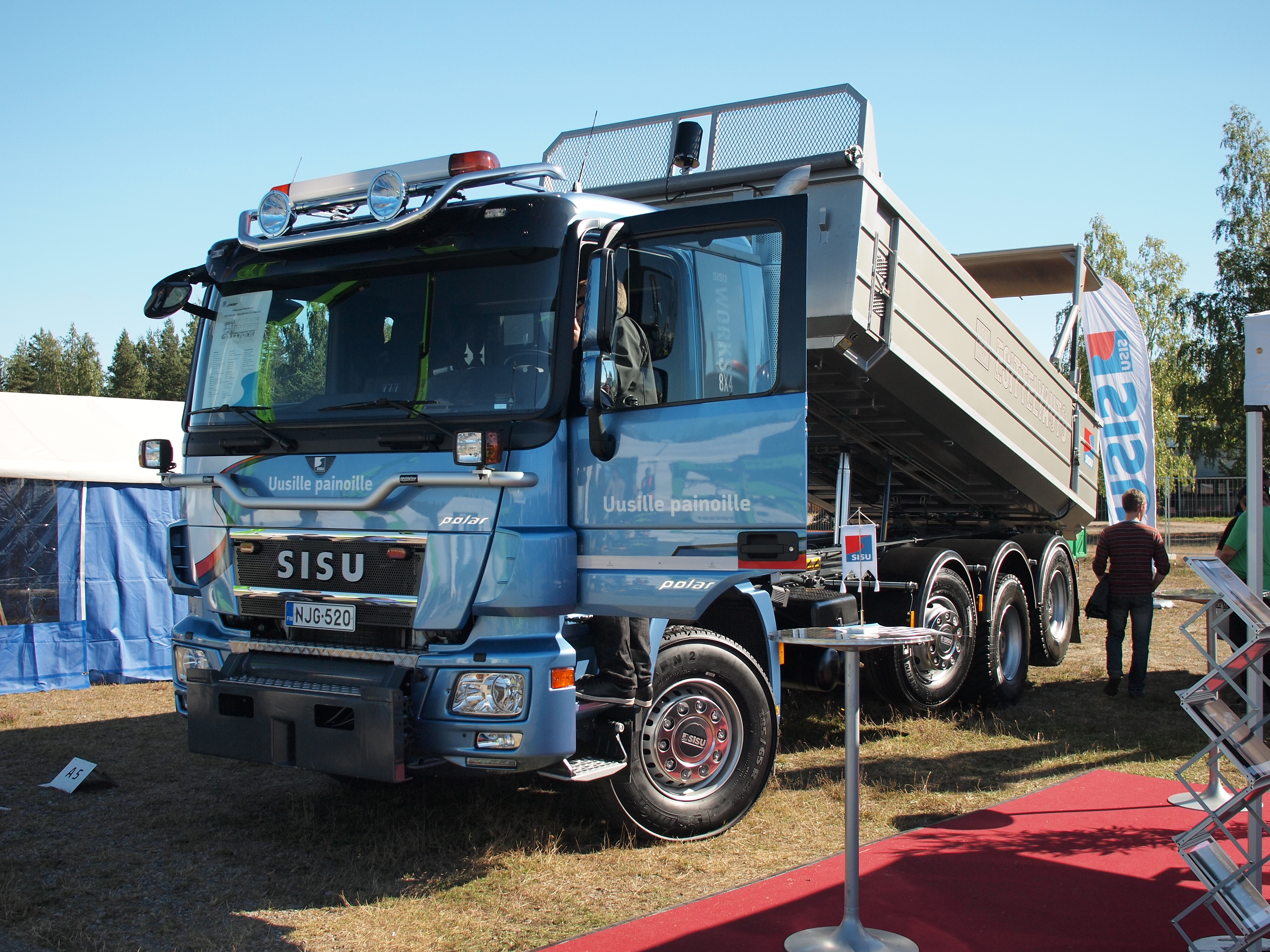
Sisu Polar by Sisu Auto.

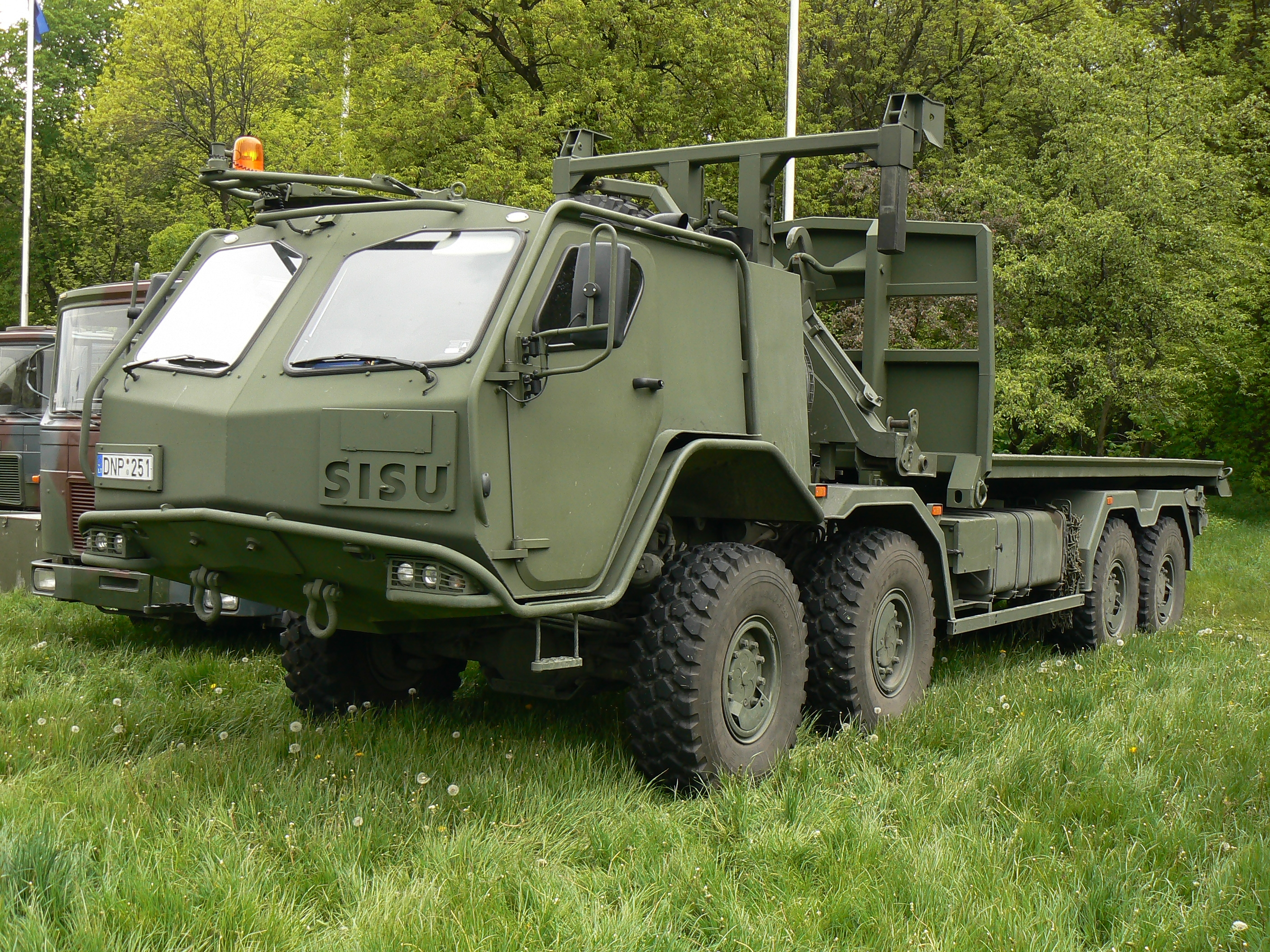
Sisu E13TP by Sisu Auto.

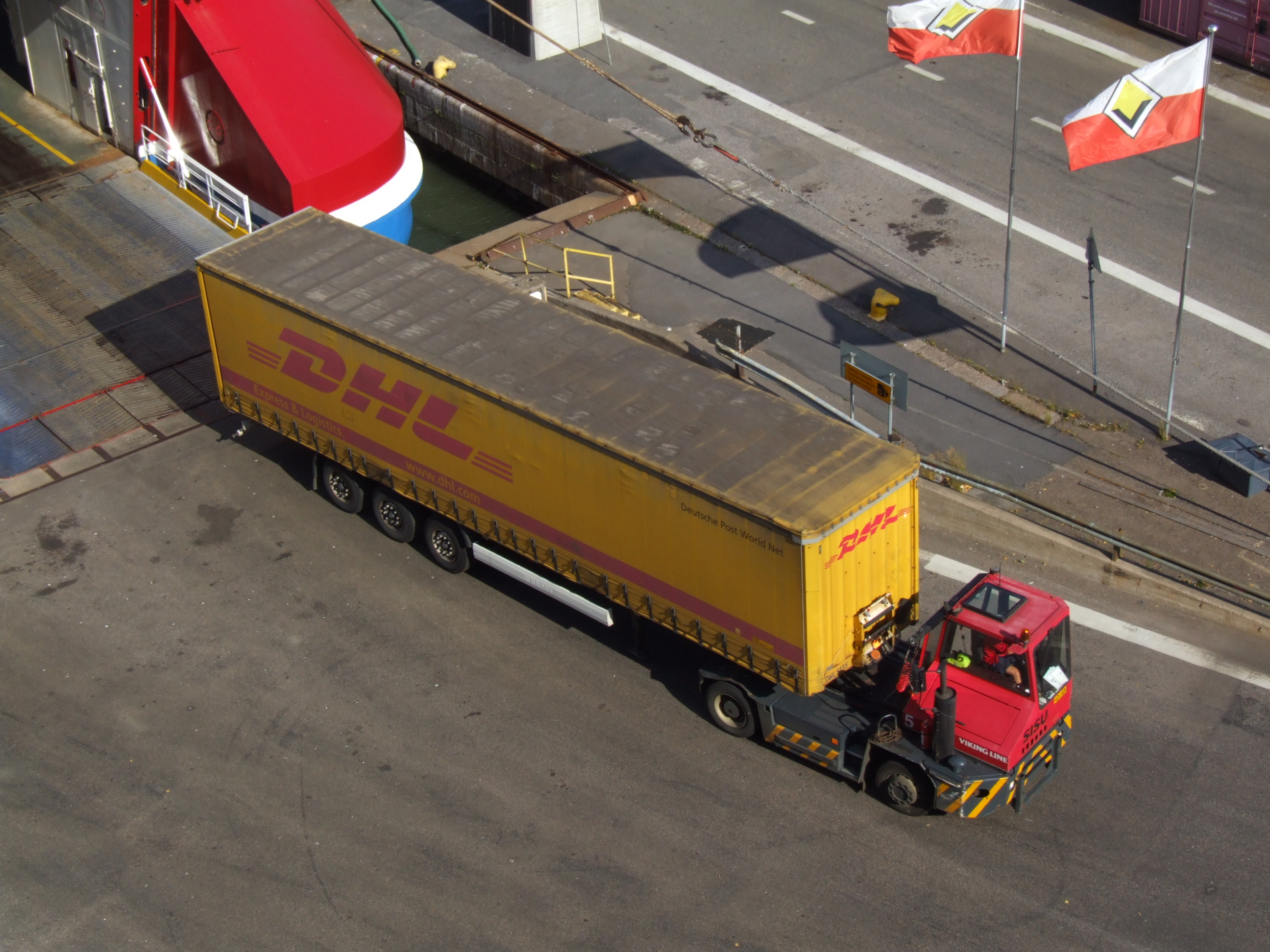
Sisu terminal tractor by Sisu Terminal Systems.

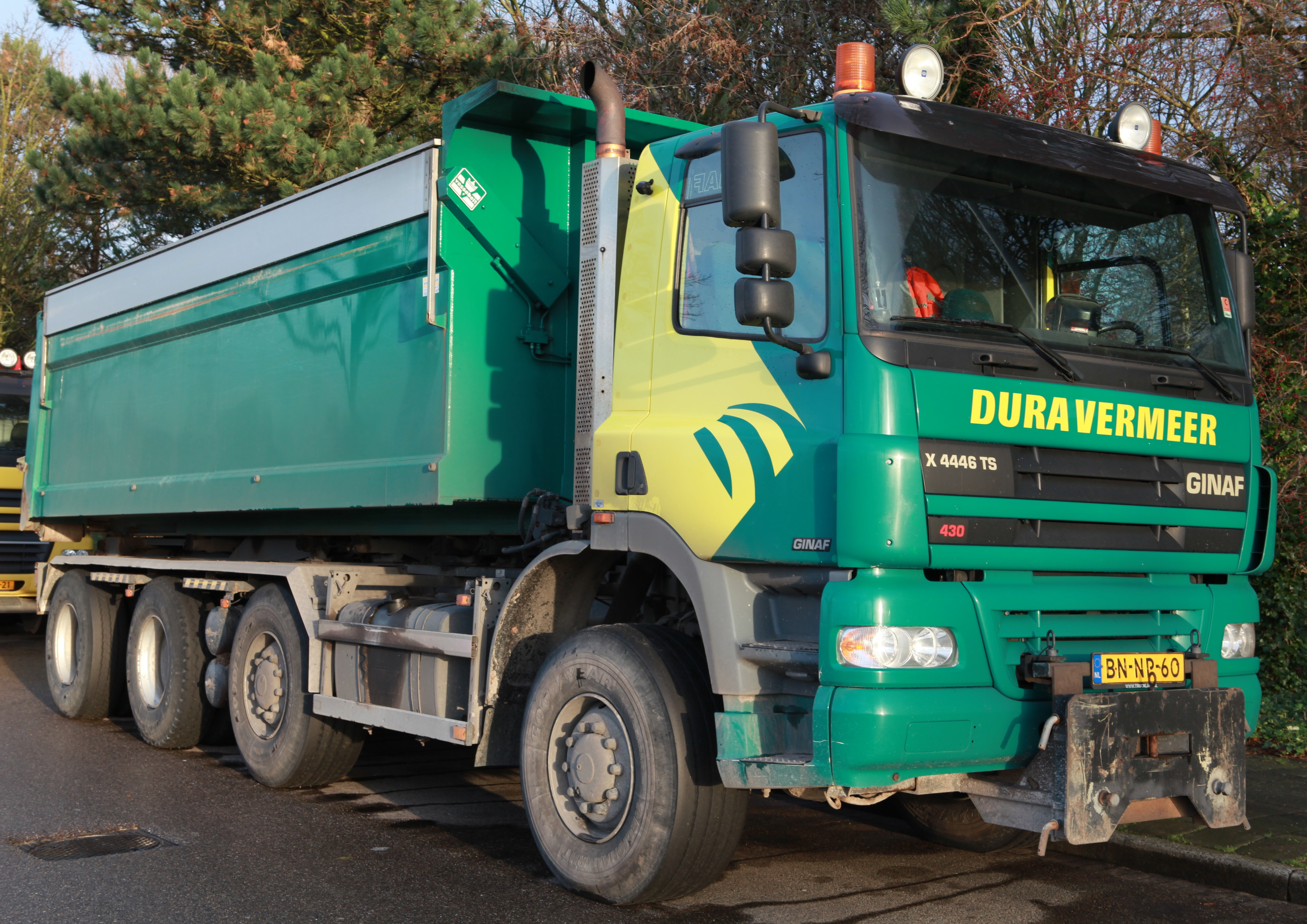
GINAF earthmover.

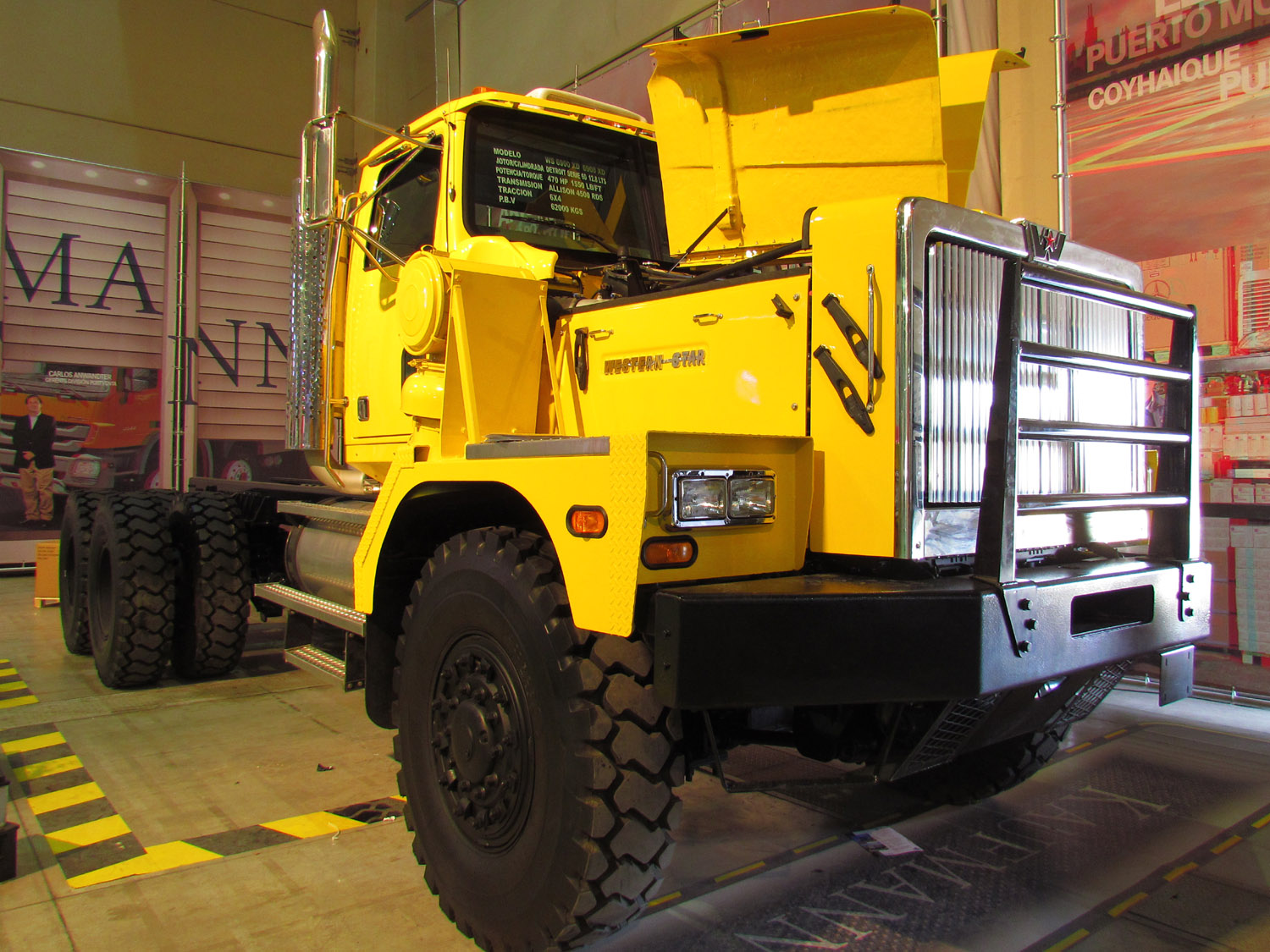
Western Star.

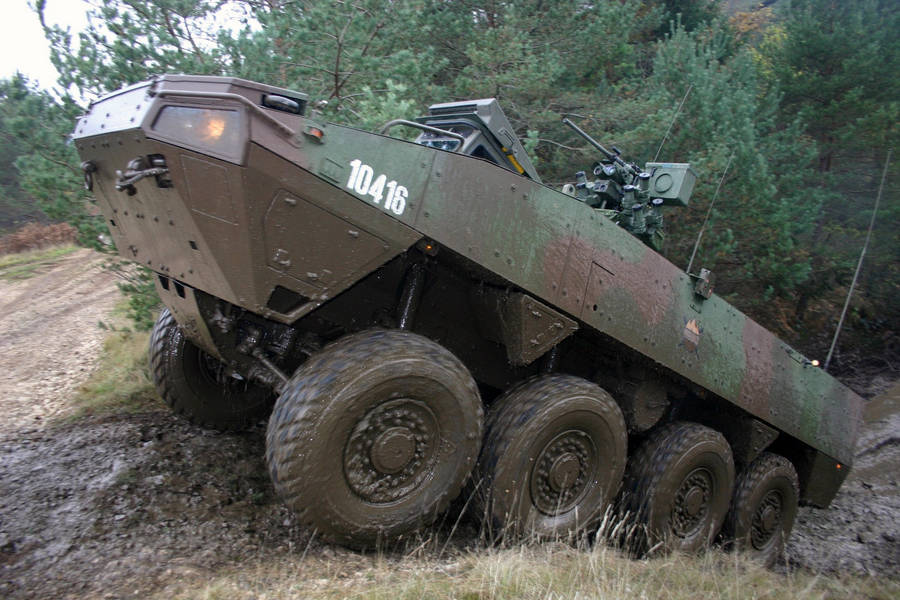
Patria AMV 8×8 with independent suspension system.

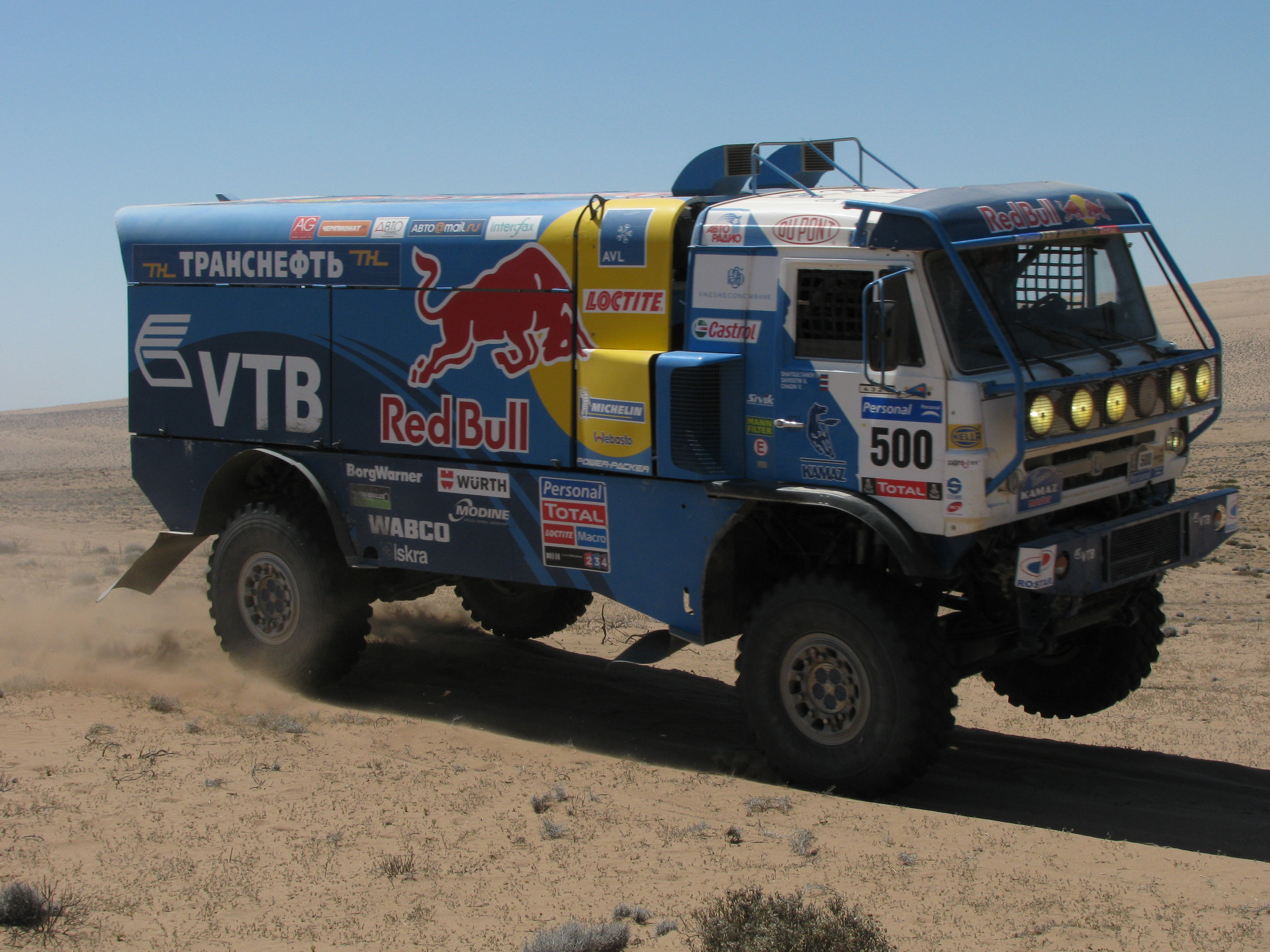
Kamaz Master in 2011 Dakar Rally.

== History ==
Oy Suomen Autoteollisuus Ab (SAT), the producer of Sisu vehicles, started its own axle production in Fleming Street factory, Helsinki in 1942 due to war-time poor availability of components. The initial design was borrowed from Timken axles which had previously been commonly used in Sisu vehicles.

The line-type manufacturing process was replaced by team-based production in 1960s. Production of heavier axles required investments; major part of machinery was renewed.

Due to lack of space in the old factory and the company's decision to sell its property in Fleming Street, Helsinki as a part of its restructuring programme, the production was transferred to the Hämeenlinna factory in 1985. Start of the production in the new, modern facilities with state-of-the-art machinery relied on some twenty white collar and fifteen blue collar workers who had moved from Helsinki and trained the new personnel. Many of the new employees were young people, newly graduated from professional school and with very little work experience.

The production grew steadily by end of 1980s and in 1989 a decision about enlarging of the facilities was made. An extension part was opened in the following year.

The axle business unit was separated to a different company Sisu Akselit Oy at the end of 1995. Following the acquisition of Sisu Corporation, the owner of Sisu Axles became Partek which sold the majority of it to the management and private investors in 1999. As a consequence the company became an independent axle producer. Since December 2011 Sisu Axles has been a part of Marmon-Herrington Company.

== Sources ==
- Blomberg, Olli. Yhteissisusta Vanajan ja Sisun kautta Patriaan [From Yhteissisu via Vanaja and Sisu to Patria] (in Finnish). Hämeenlinna: Patria Vehicles Oy. ISBN 952-91-5613-8.
- Blomberg, Olli (2006). Suomalaista Sisua vuodesta 1931 – Monialaosaajasta kuorma-autotehtaaksi [Finnish Sisu since 1931 – From multi-industrial expert to lorry factory] (in Finnish). Karis: Oy Sisu Auto Ab. ISBN 952-91-4918-2.
