= Parallel loan =

A parallel loan is two loans taken out by two pairs of companies in different countries from local lenders with the aim of swapping the resulting loans in different currencies. It was an early form of currency swap.

In a parallel loan there is an exchange of currencies between four parties which promises that the loan will be repaid at a specified future date and predetermined exchange rate. It consists of two pairs of the affiliated companies and two pairs parents companies in two different countries. It occurs between two companies simultaneously when a company has a relative advantage in the cost of funds and then borrows those funds to a foreign affiliate in its own country at a rate lower than the foreign affiliate would have to pay at its parent company's country. Besides that, the parallel loan is “similar to cross-border loan, but there are no currencies in the foreign exchange markets”.

The parallel loan is very similar to a back-to-back loan. The parallel loan was one of the proactive management of operating exposure that offsetting expected foreign exchange exposure. Two business companies in different countries will borrow currency to each other for a particular period of time and they will return the borrowed currencies on the date they agreed to with the same loaned amount. The two loans will be valued at the prevailing spot rate and the prescribed period. The currencies borrowing activities conducted outside the foreign exchange market to avoid foreign exchange risk and legal limitations.

== History ==
The parallel loan was established in the early 1970s in effect of the exchange controls in the United Kingdom on British companies. The implementation of exchange control has caused many British firms withdrawn their decision to extend their business because investing in foreign market is not attractive. After the abolition of foreign exchange control in 1979, parallel loan kept on being utilized with the goal of hedging long-term foreign currency exposure at a lower cost than what will be imposed in the foreign exchange market. At that time, UK organizations needed to pay a premium to get a loan in US dollars. In order to prevent this situation, UK organizations set up parallel or back-to-back loan agreement with US organizations that wish to acquire sterling.

The parallel loan market was created to avoid confinements imposed by the Bank of England on the free stream of British pounds. Most of the British companies who are desire to invest abroad need to change pounds into US dollars at an exchange rate over the market exchange rate. The motivation behind this strategy was to safeguard the value of the pound among other currencies. However, companies actually were not keen on providing financial aid to the Bank of England by committing the above-market rate for every dollar obtained from the exchange rate implemented in the policy. Prevention for these currency control leads straightforwardly to the improvement of the market for the currency swaps.

Initiated as a way of avoiding currency regulations, the practice had, by the mid-1990s, largely been replaced by currency swaps.

== Advantages and disadvantages ==
The parallel loan not only evolved to circumvent exchange control regulations, but it also permits companies to borrow funds in foreign currencies at rates lower than they might get in foreign exchange market, as overseas companies. In this situation, the parallel loan brings a few advantages and disadvantages to the companies.

=== Advantages ===
1. Cost of the fund is fixed: The transfer of funds is less costly for both companies compared to the cost of financing from its parent company and loans from banks. In addition, the subsidiary in the country may face the problem of higher lending cost from banks if the subsidiary is not well known and its credit rating may not as high as its parent company.
2. Protection against exchange rate risk: There is no foreign exchange exposure since it uses local currency where the subsidiaries are located and there is no need to enter the foreign exchange market to repay the loans.

=== Disadvantages ===
1. Hard to find counterparties with the matching needs: Company may face the problem of finding its counterparty with the mirror image financing needs with another company such as the currencies, principals, type of interest payments, frequency of the interest payments and length of the loan period.
2. Obligated to comply with an agreement even opposite party fails to fulfill the obligation: In order to prevent this situation happen, a separate agreement is registered to offset the party who being defaulted by another party.
3. Large fees imposed on matching two companies: There is a need to hire a brokerage or investment banker to arrange this type of transactions and the companies who hire need to paid an amount of fees to the brokerage houses.
