= S.P.A. Truck Corporation =

American truck manufacturer

S.P.A. Truck Corporation (S-P-A) was a manufacturer of trucks, which was owned and operated by Studebaker Corporation and its wholly owned subsidiary, Pierce-Arrow of Buffalo, New York. The name SPA was based on Studebaker, Pierce and Arrow. SPA manufactured trucks from 1930 to 1933.

While the Studebaker industrial fortune had been made by building Conestoga wagons, Studebaker had been late in entering the modern truck market, doing so in 1928. While Studebaker plants were running at near capacity, executives planned on using Pierce-Arrow's unused excess capacity to handle truck production demand.

Studebaker attempted to acquire White Motor Company in 1932, a known manufacturer of heavy duty trucks based in Cleveland, Ohio. White backed out of the deal just before March 1933; Studebaker then sold Pierce Arrow to investors, which were forced into bankruptcy and liquidated the firm in 1938.

When Studebaker filed for receivership in March 1933, SPA was liquidated and Studebaker focused its attention on automobiles, producing a modest volume of trucks until the late 1930s.
