= Mercedes-Benz Actros =

German heavy-duty truck

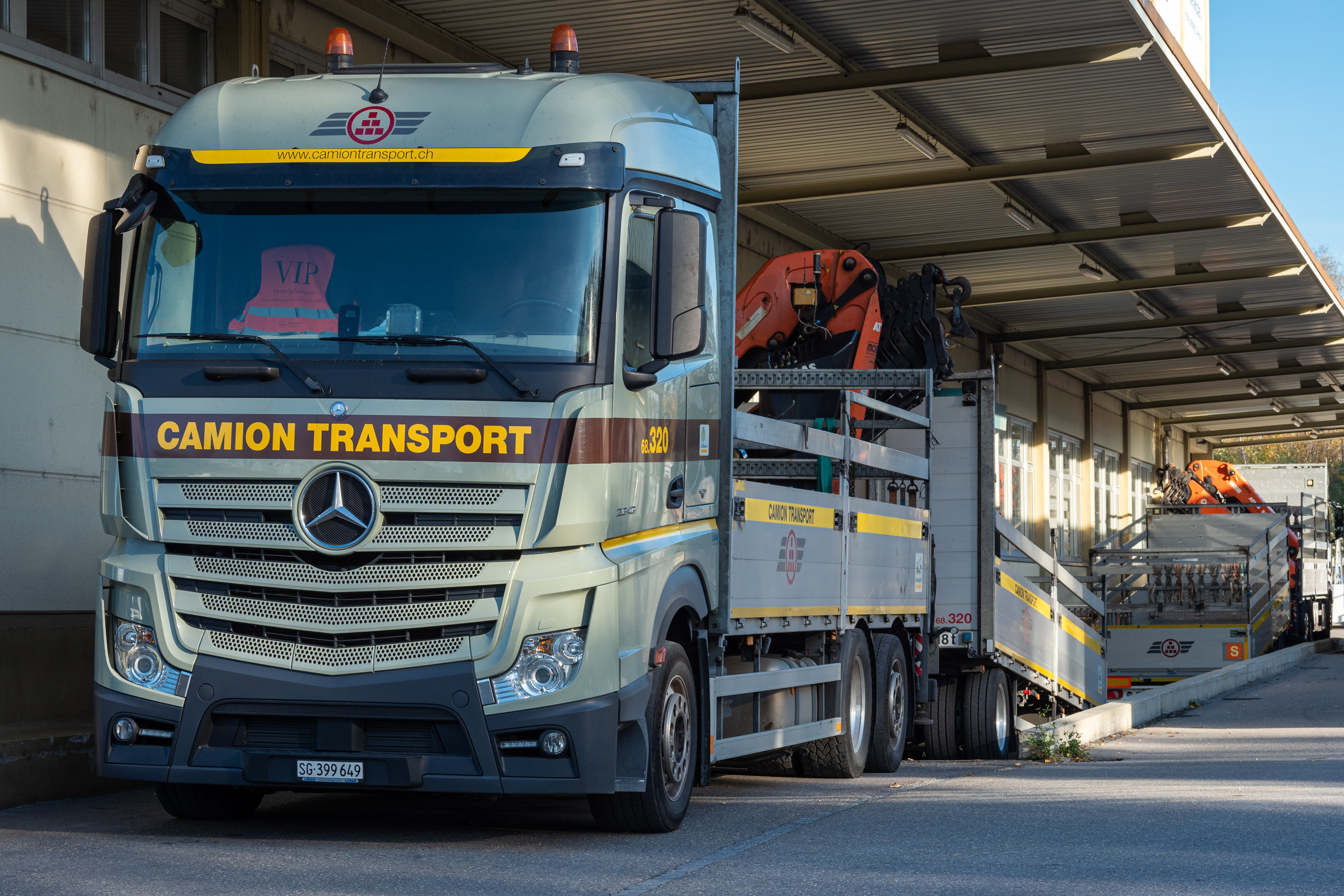

Overview
- Manufacturer: Mercedes-Benz
- Production: 1996–present
- Assembly: Germany: Wörth; Brazil: São Bernardo do Campo; China: Beijing (Beijing Foton Daimler Automotive); Turkey: Aksaray (Mercedes-Benz Türk)

Body and chassis
- Class: Truck
- Body style: Cabover truck
- Related: Freightliner Cascadia (interior only)

Chronology
- Predecessor: Mercedes-Benz SK

The Mercedes-Benz Actros is a heavy goods vehicle introduced by Mercedes-Benz at the 1996 Commercial Vehicle IAA in Hannover, Germany, as the replacement for the SK. It is normally used for long-distance haulage, heavy-duty distribution haulage, and construction haulage. It is powered by an inline-6 diesel engine with a turbocharger and intercooler. In 2002, Daimler Trucks/Lorries launched version II of the Actros and in 2007, launched the version III. The fourth generation of the Actros, officially named "the New Actros", was launched in July 2011.

== First generation (MP1) ==
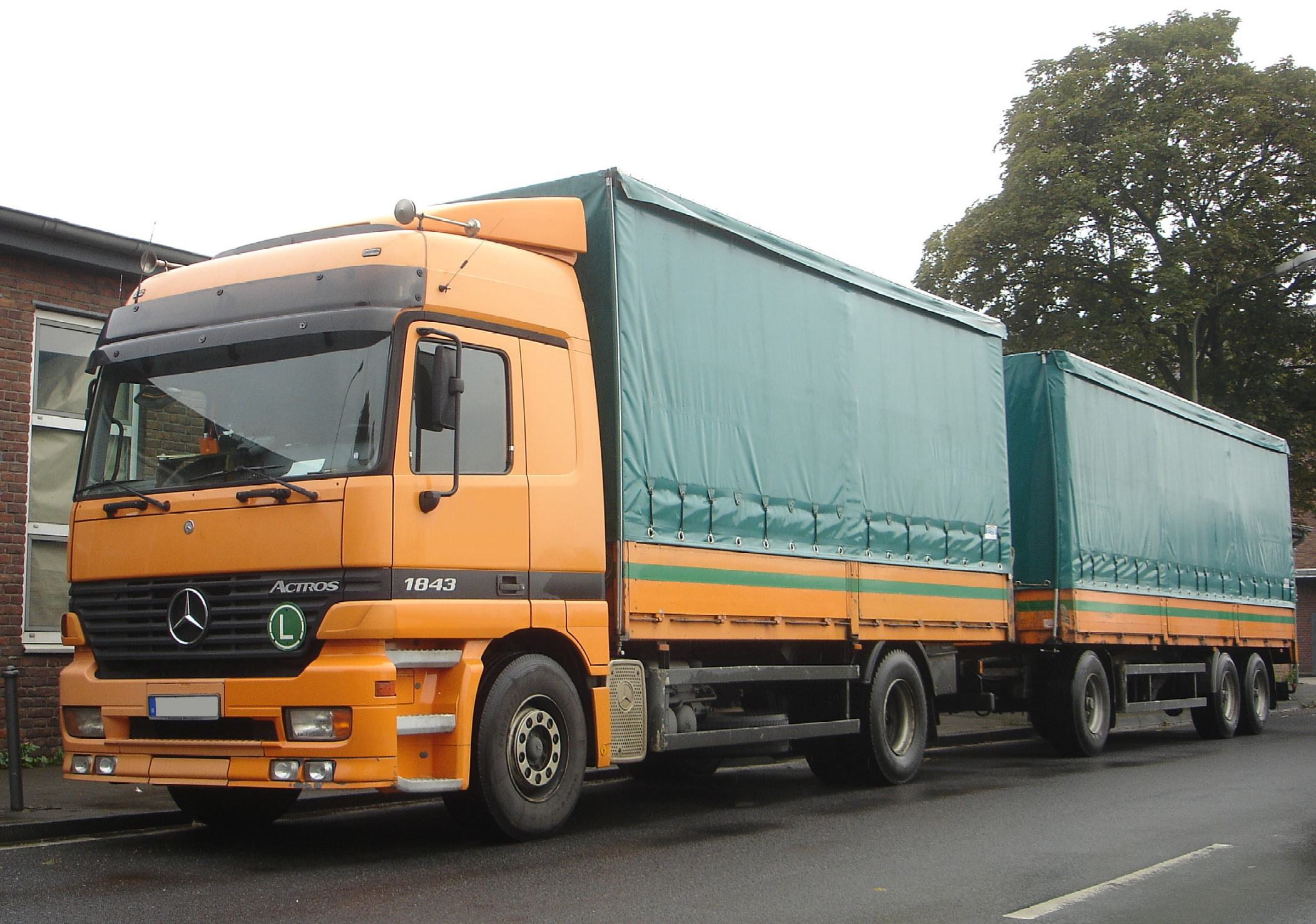
- First-generation Actros

Powertrain
- Engine: 12 L OM501LA Turbo Intercooled V6; 16 L OM502LA Turbo Intercooled V8
- Transmission: 16 speed Manual/Automatic

The first generation Actros was introduced in 1996, and production continued until 2003. It had new features such as an electronically controlled air brake system, intelligent disc brakes on both front and rear, and the introduction of Controller Area Network (CAN) technology for the chassis and drivetrain. electro-pneumatic circuit on the new transmission models and the introduction of the new OM 500 V6 and V8 diesel engines with Telligent engine control.

=== Chassis and Powertrain ===
As the first truck to emerge with collaboration between designers and aerodynamic engineers, the manufacturer was able to reduce flow resistance on the Actros by 17%.

The chassis of the Actros is produced with two, three, or four axle models, with the option of air suspension. A total of 3300 mm and 6300 mm wheelbases can be selected; the construction version of the Actros is available between 3300 and 5100 mm wheelbases with the option of leaf or air suspension on the front axle and parabolic leaf springs on the rear.

The construction variant of the Actros with a 4x2 axle configuration is equipped with drum brakes.

=== Engine and Transmission ===
The engines for the MP1 Actros are equipped with an OM501LA V6 or OM502 V8 mated to a 16-speed manual gearbox or a 16-speed hydro-pneumatically operated automatic gearbox.

==== Fuel Processing ====
A new feature of the Actros is the Pump-Line Nozzle Fuel Injection System, an improvement over the more traditional plug-in pumps that have been used for decades. Each cylinder has its own injection pump, which is driven by its own camshaft.

== Second generation (MP2) ==
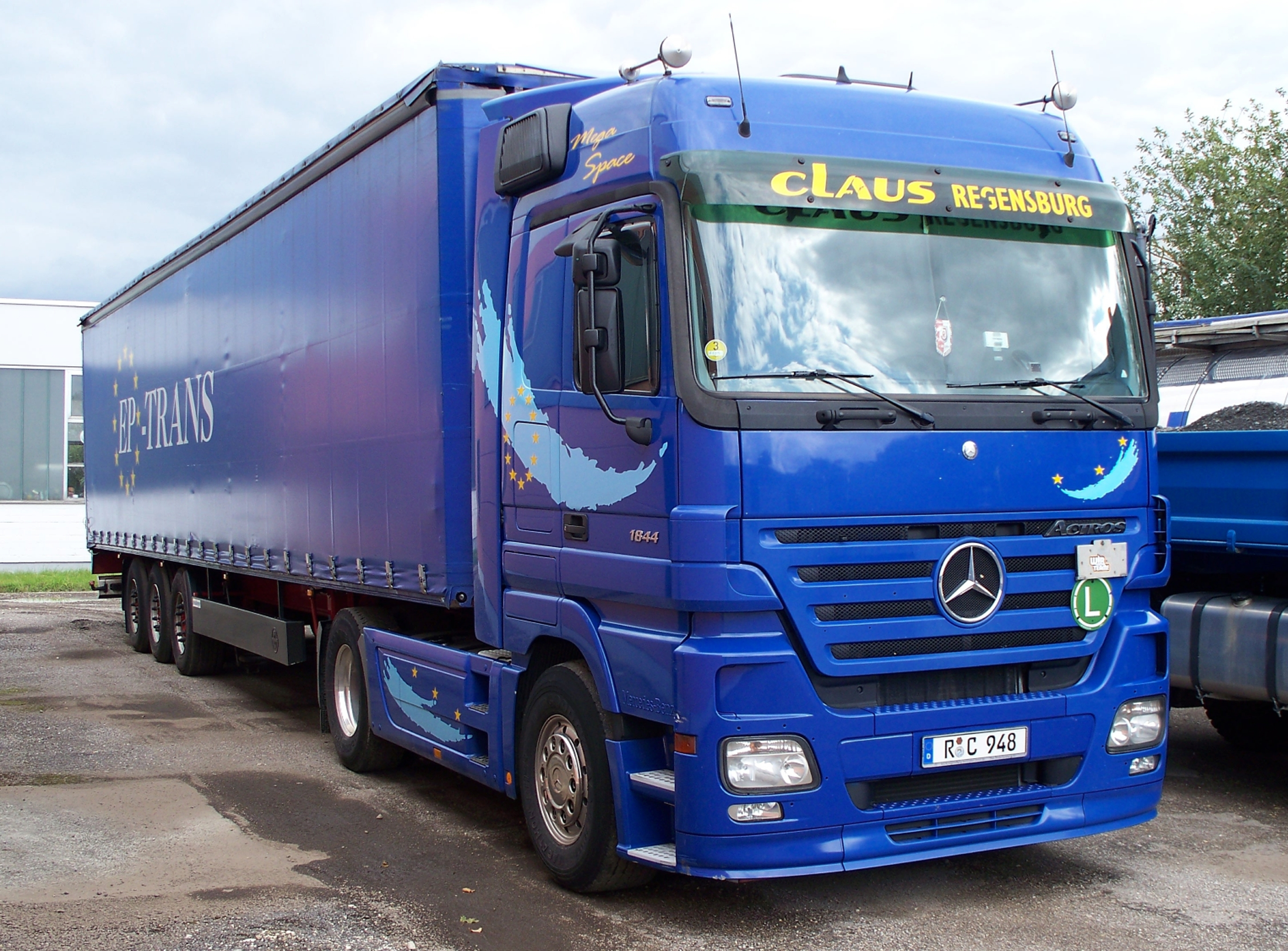
- Second-generation Actros

Powertrain
- Engine: 12 L OM501LA Turbo Intercooled V6; 16 L OM502LA Turbo Intercooled V8
- Transmission: 16 speed Automated manual transmission

The second-generation Actros was released in 2003 with upgraded interior and exterior components such as Bi-Xenon headlamps, updated Euro 3 emission compliance, a lighter rear axle, and new equipment.

Mercedes-Benz released a new special edition of the Actros, the Black Edition series, which is limited to 250 units. This Black Edition Series comes with a 450 kW (612 PS) OM502LA V8 engine with upgraded interior and exterior components such as bird's-eye maple, leather-wrapped steering wheel and seat covers with Mercedes-Benz "Star" badge, a specially designed grille with chrome clasp, a new front apron with stainless steel grill, chrome-framed headlights, and chrome-plated side mirrors.

=== Transmission ===
The second generation comes with an electronic sequential gearbox that Mercedes-Benz has dubbed the "Telligent Gearbox." It pushes forward the principle used in some earlier Mercedes-Benz tractors: using the gearshift lever to command a pneumatically actuated system that changes the gears. The Telligent gearbox utilizes a computer together with a load-sensing system on the fifth-wheel coupling to estimate the proper gear that the truck must be in.

== Third generation (MP3) ==
Mercedes-Benz Actros
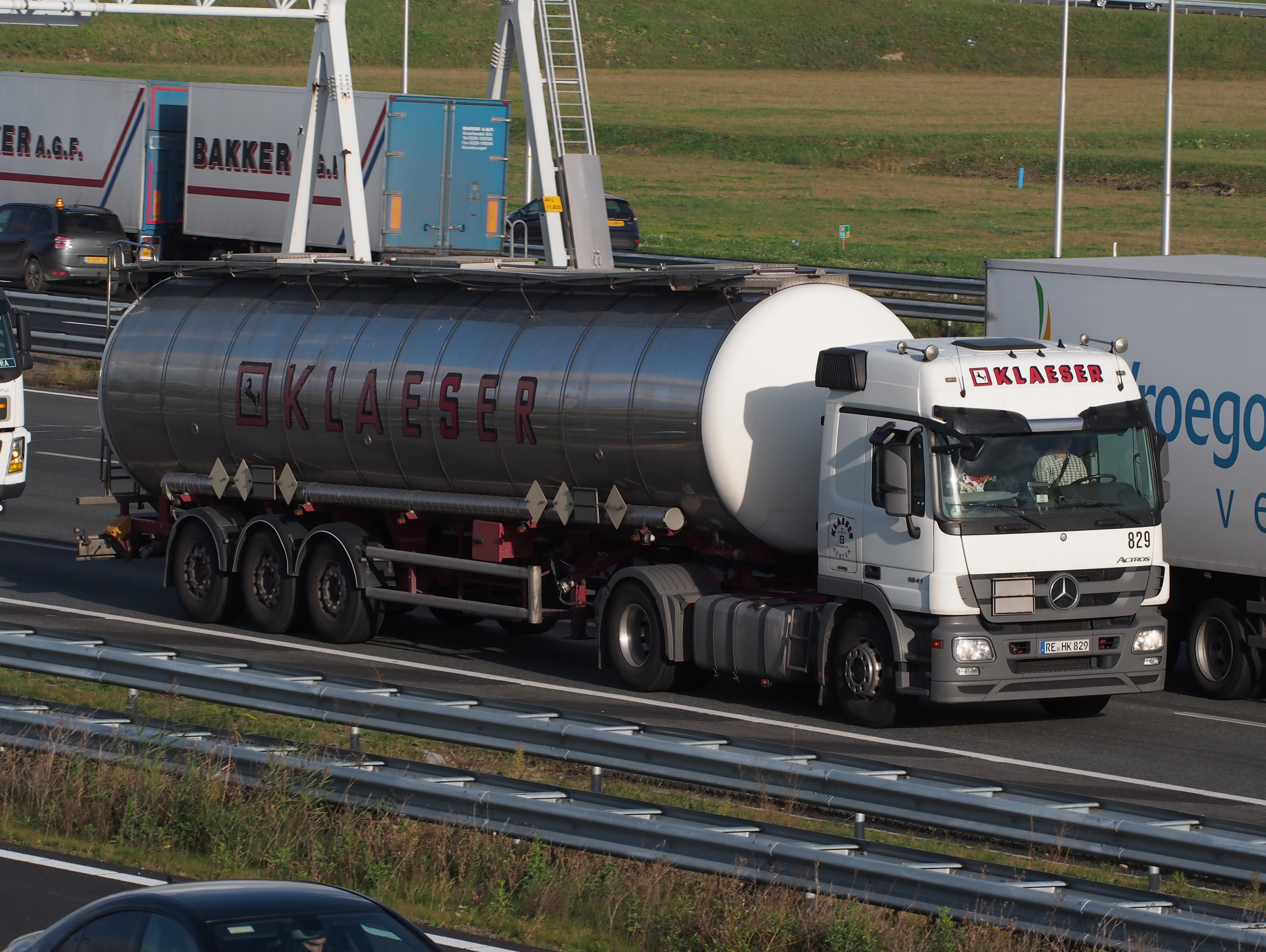
- Third-generation Actros (2008 facelift) 1841

Overview
- Production: 2008–2012; until 2020 for export model

Powertrain
- Engine: 12 L OM541LA Turbo Intercooled V6; 16 L OM542LA Turbo Intercooled V8
- Transmission: 12/16 speed Powershift AMT

The third-generation Actros was introduced in 2008 at the IAA Commercial Vehicles, and it was the last facelift of the previous Actros. At the time of launch, the Actros was the first truck in the segment to offer automatic transmission as standard.

The changes for the MP3 Actros are the side mirrors, which were adapted from the special edition models of the previous generation. They have closed brackets, and slightly revised Bi-Xenon headlamps. A battery status indicator was added, as were rain and light sensors, a world first for a truck.

The third-generation Actros ended production in 2011 and were replaced with the New Actros. There were plans to continue production in Asia and other countries up until 2020.

=== Engines ===
The Mercedes-Benz Actros is equipped with two types of engines: the OM 501 LA-541 and the OM 502 LA-542. The OM 501 is a 12-litre V6 and has outputs ranging from 228 to 353 kW (310 to 480 PS). The engine management system employed by this engine is a Unit injector (single plug-in pumps for each cylinder), supplying fuel under pressure up to 160 MPa (1,600 bar) to the injection valves. A control unit (MR) monitors all engine operating conditions via several sensors and varies the injection pressure to suit each operating need. The OM502 is a V8 engine that has an output ranging from 257 to 480 kW (350 to 652 PS).

=== Cabin ===
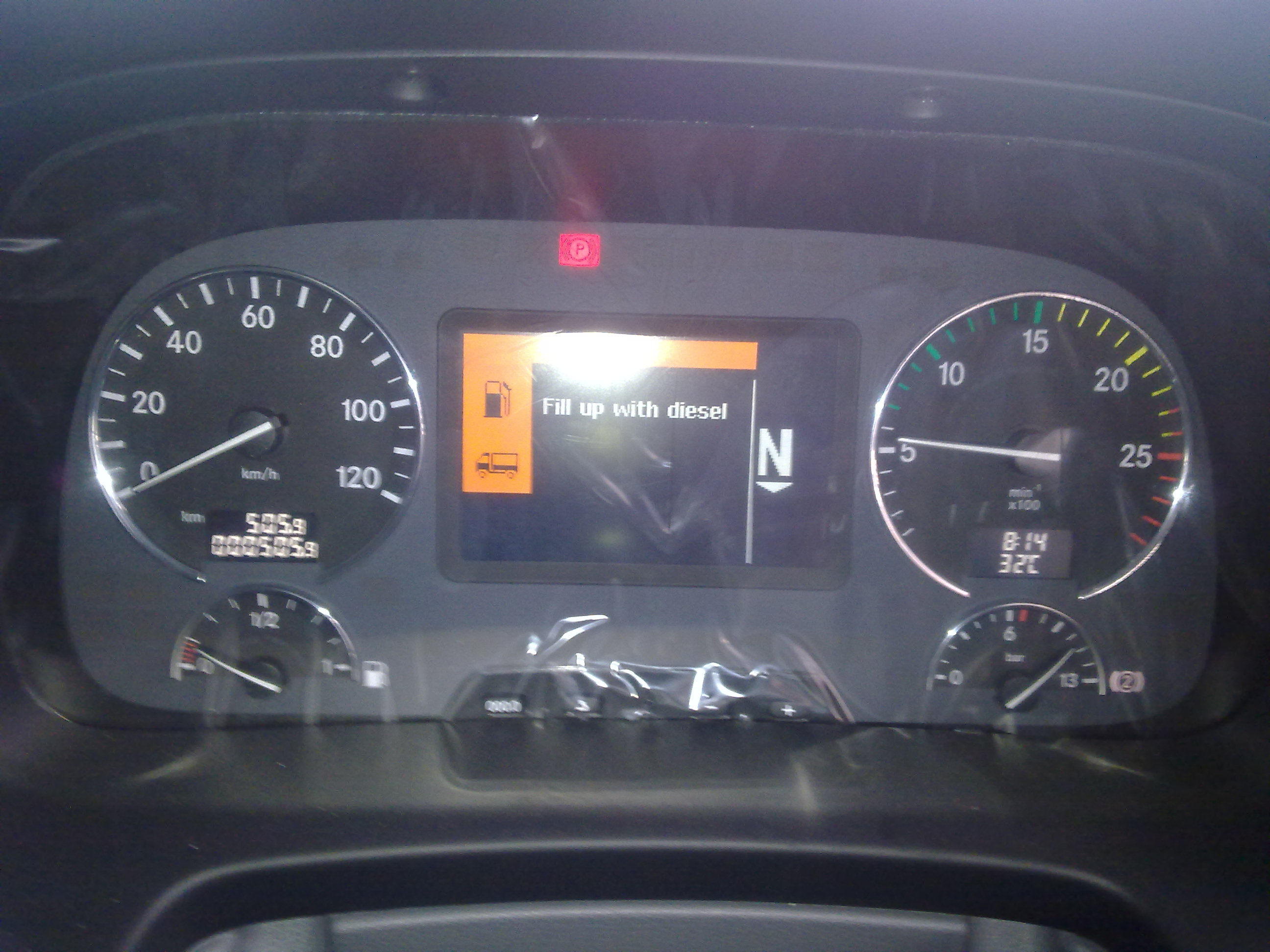
Instrument cluster in 2010 Actros 3

The Actros cabs come in four types:

- S is designed for daily operation and construction vehicles such as cement trucks. The daily cab has its front bumper lower to the ground to prevent under-run, whereas the construction version of the S cab has its front bumper higher to prevent hitting an obstacle when driving off-road on the site.
- M is designed for distribution vehicles. It offers a sleeper, though comfort has not been as focused on as in the L cab. It comes in short and long sleeper versions.
- L: low-roof long-haul cab, providing comfortable driving and rest for the driver.
- LH "MegaSpace": long-haul high-roof cab, providing comfort for long driving as well as enough space for the driver and/or passenger to freely move around the cab when needed.

=== Electronics ===
Depending on the model, either Actros 1, 2, or 3, the electronics may vary. For example, the braking system known as EPB or BS from Wabco incorporates Anti-lock braking system and Traction control system functions. The stopping distance of the Actros was much reduced compared to its predecessor, the SK. In later models of Actros 2 and all Actros 3 models, the braking system was improved to EPB 2.

The electronics in Actros 1 are networked via Controller Area Network (CAN) in a system known as IES (Integrated Electronics System), with the instrument cluster as the Central Gateway (CGW) or interphase. In Actros 2 and 3, the electronics are also networked by CAN in a system known as KontAkt (the concept of the electronic systems in the Actros).

A wide range of other electronic features was or is offered as extras. These include lane assist (which warns the driver if they inadvertently leave their lane), Adaptive cruise control (it automatically adjusts the vehicle speed to maintain a safe distance from vehicles ahead), side-looking radar for warning the driver about a vehicle in their blind spot, and more, mostly oriented towards safety.

=== Military variants ===
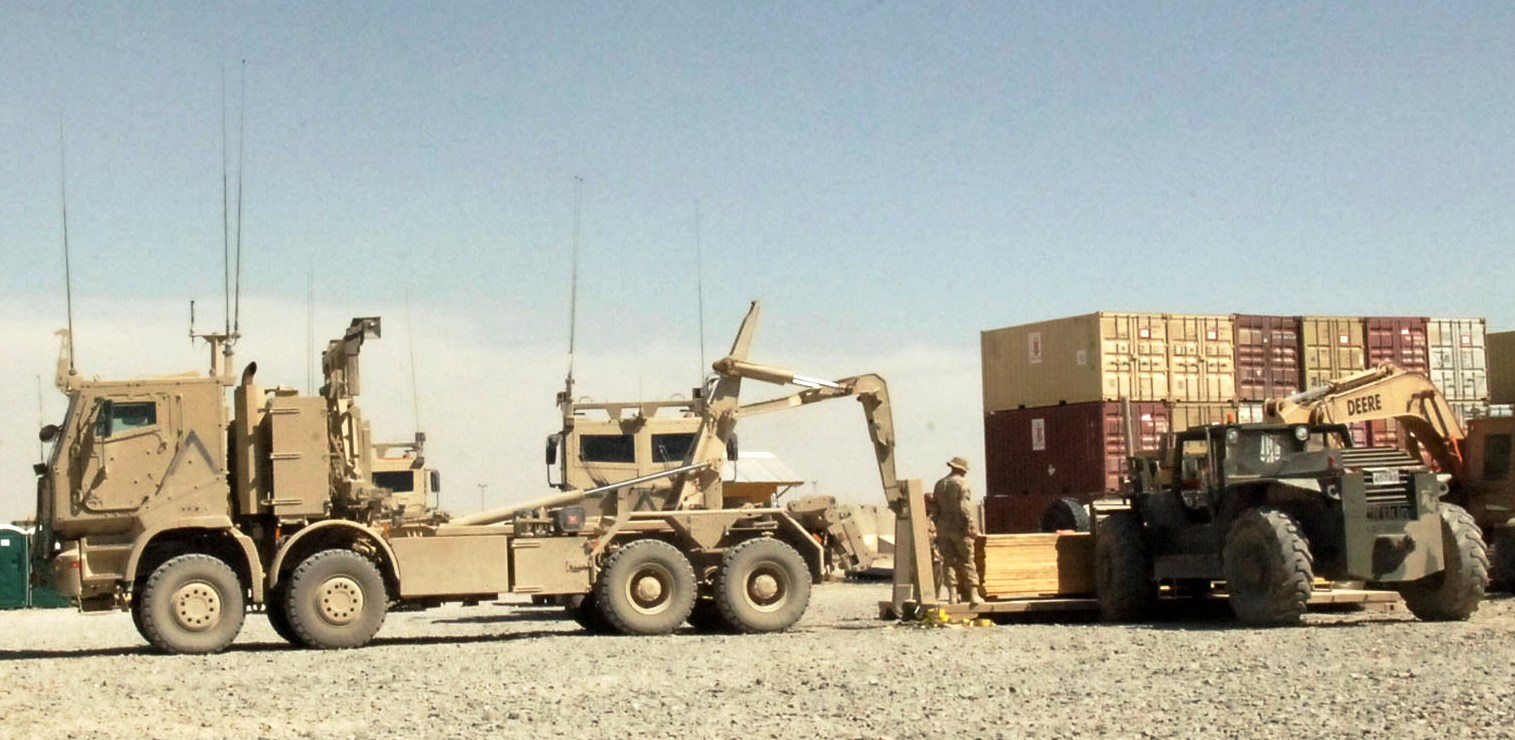
Armored Heavy Support Vehicle System of the Canadian Army in Afghanistan

Actros Armored Heavy Support Vehicle System (AHSVS) is a military armored truck (86 were ordered by the Canadian Army in 2007) using the civilian Actros platform with a protected cab developed by Land Mobility Technologies in South Africa in cooperation with Composhield of Denmark for Mercedes-Benz.

Singapore uses military variants of the Actros for its Singapore Army in heavy-lift logistical support roles, designated as the HMCT (High Mobility Cargo Transporter), and recently as a launch platform for the air defense system and the intercontinental ballistic missile trailer. SAF also uses it as a fuel truck and as an ambulance.

In 2010, New Zealand purchased four Actros to haul adjustable-width quad-axle low-loader semi trailers primarily for the transportation of LAVs (light armored vehicles).

== Fourth generation (MP4) ==
Mercedes-Benz Actros (4th generation)
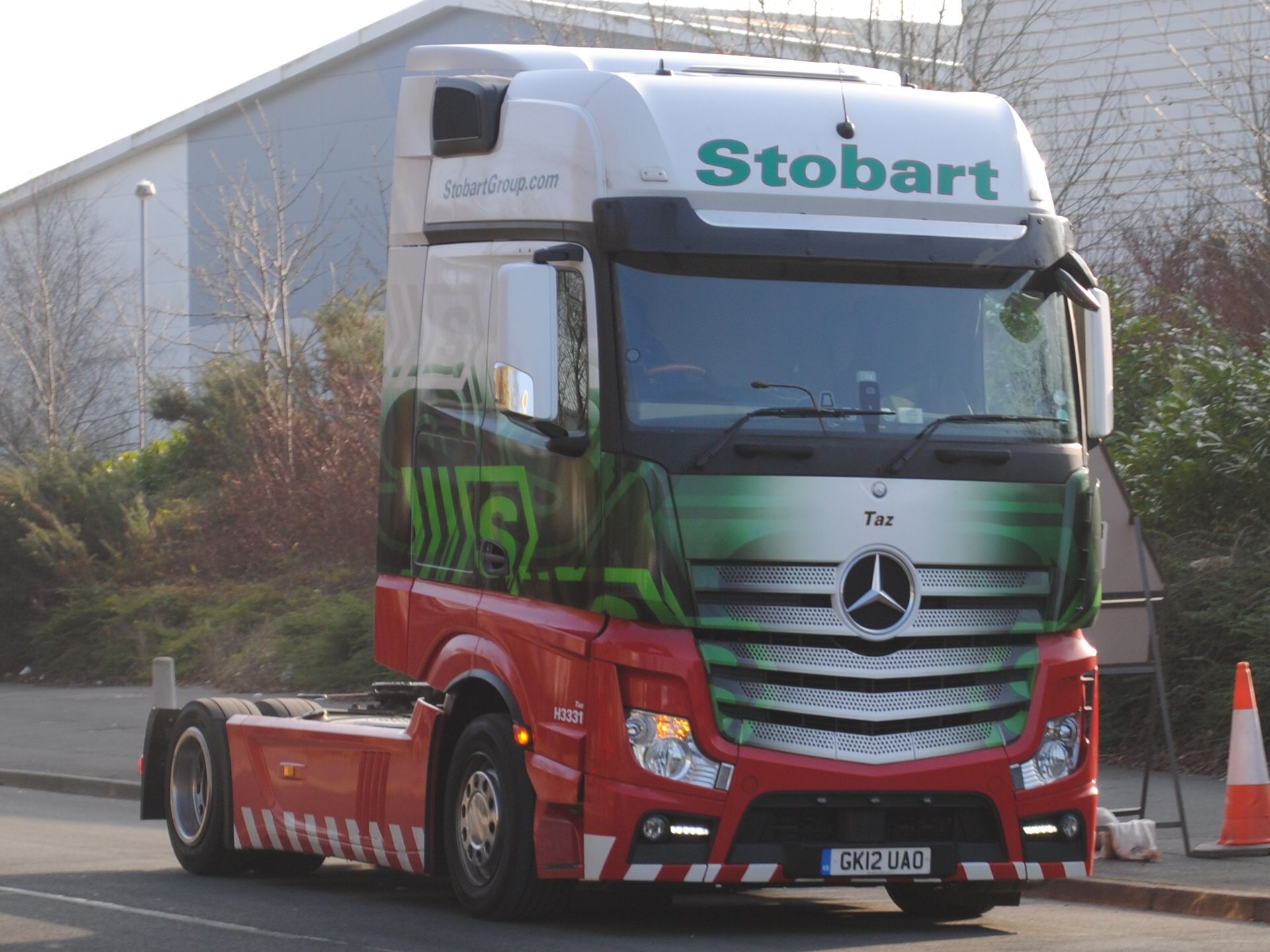
- Mercedes New Actros of Eddie Stobart

Overview
- Also called: New Actros
- Production: 2011–present

Powertrain
- Engine: 10.7 L OM470LA Turbo Intercooled I-6; 12.8 L OM471LA Turbo Intercooled I-6; 15.6 L OM473LA Turbo Intercooled I-6
- Transmission: 12/16 speed Powershift AMT

In 2011, the New Actros appeared for the first time. Components are not shared with its predecessors. Although available at launch with Euro V emissions standards, the New Actros was designed as a Euro VI truck with the additional space required for cooling systems.

The fourth version offers several engine options in either Euro-5 or Euro-6. In Euro-6, inline-six engines are used in both series: OM471 with a 12,8-litre engine range power output of 310 to 390 kW (422 to 530 PS) and OM473 with a 15.6-litre engine range power output of 380 to 460 kW (517 to 625 PS), with a fuel rail pressure of 280 MPa (2,800 bar) and a double overhead camshaft (DOHC) with 24 valves in compliant models.

=== Safety ===
Euro NCAP test results Mercedes-Benz Actros 6x2 Rigid (2025)
Test	Score
Overall:	5 /5 stars
Safe driving	90%
Crash avoidance	78%
Post crash	80%

Euro NCAP test results Mercedes-Benz Actros 4x2 Tractor Unit (2025)
Test	Score
Overall:	5 /5 stars
Safe driving	90%
Crash avoidance	78%
Post crash	80%

Euro NCAP test results Mercedes-Benz Actros 4x2 Rigid (2026)
Test	Score
Overall:	5 /5 stars
Safe driving	89%
Crash avoidance	87%
Post crash	80%

== Fifth generation (MP5) ==
Mercedes-Benz Actros (5th generation)
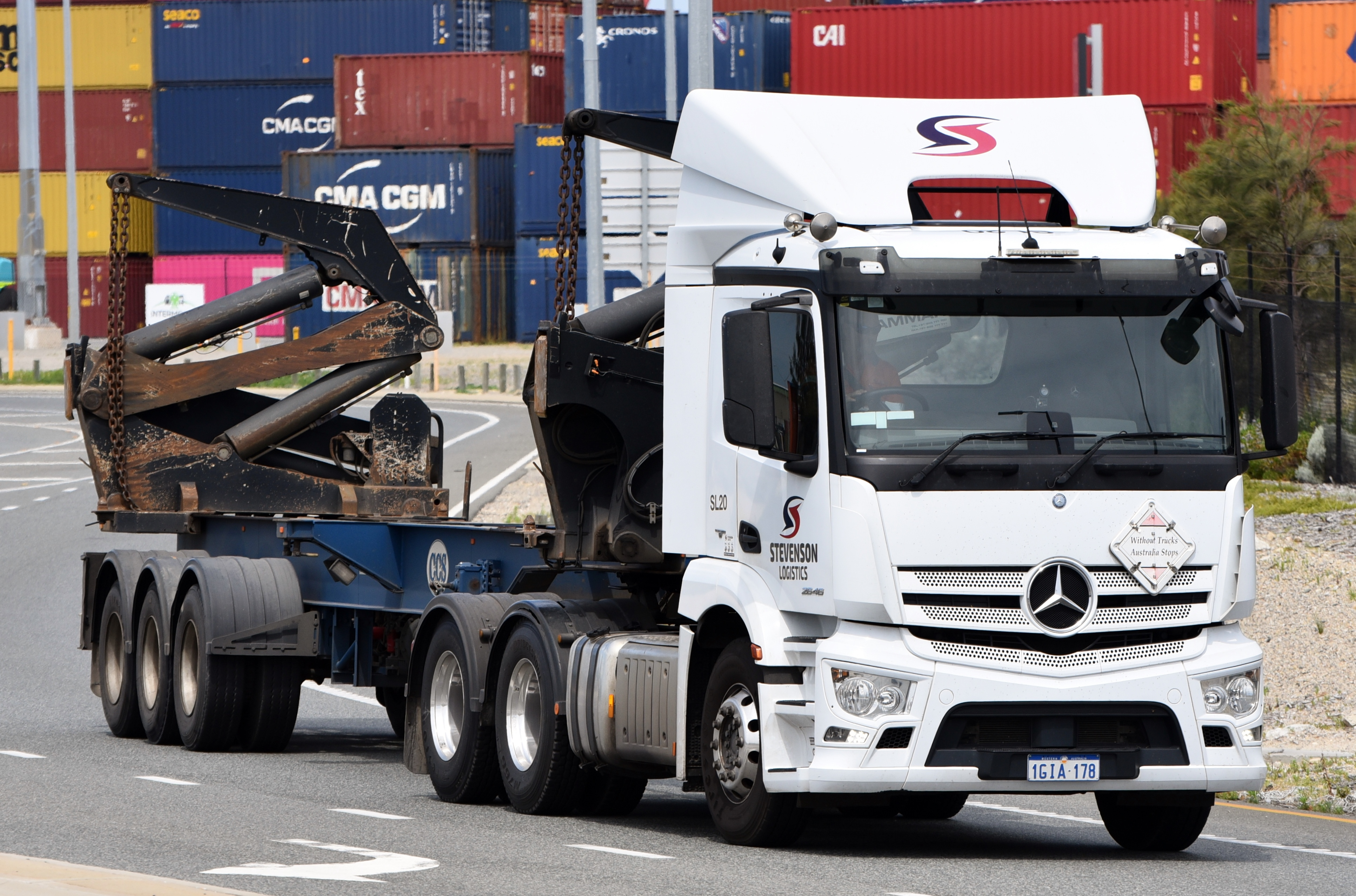
- 2020 Mercedes Benz Actros with traditional mirrors instead of MirrorCam

Overview
- Production: 2018–present

Powertrain
- Engine: 10.7 L OM470LA Turbo Intercooled I-6; 12.8 L OM471LA Turbo Intercooled I-6; 15.6 L OM473LA Turbo Intercooled I-6
- Transmission: 12/16 speed Powershift AMT
- Battery: eActros 300: 336 (291 usable) kWh eActros 400: 448 (388 usable) kWh eActros LongHaul: 600+ kWh
- Plug-in charging: MCS

In September 2018, Mercedes-Benz revealed the revised 2019 Actros at the IAA Commercial Vehicles Show in Hannover, Germany. The vehicle now has two color displays (a touch screen and an infotainment display behind the steering wheel), replacing the conventional instrument cluster on old Actros models, and can be integrated with Android Auto or Apple CarPlay. Its outside mirrors were replaced with cameras, and it can do semi-automated driving using Active Drive Assist.

=== Safety ===
Euro NCAP test results Mercedes-Benz Actros L 4x2 Tractor Unit (2025)
Test	Score
Overall:	3 /5 stars
Safe driving	72%
Crash avoidance	51%
Post crash	80%

Euro NCAP test results Mercedes-Benz Actros F 6x2 Rigid (2025)
Test	Score
Overall:	4 /5 stars
Safe driving	80%
Crash avoidance	78%
Post crash	80%

Euro NCAP test results Mercedes-Benz Actros F 4x2 Tractor Unit (2025)
Test	Score
Overall:	4 /5 stars
Safe driving	80%
Crash avoidance	78%
Post crash	80%

Euro NCAP test results Mercedes-Benz Actros L 4x2 Tractor Unit (2025)
Test	Score
Overall:	4 /5 stars
Safe driving	74%
Crash avoidance	78%
Post crash	80%

Euro NCAP test results Mercedes-Benz Actros L 6x2 Rigid (2025)
Test	Score
Overall:	4 /5 stars
Safe driving	74%
Crash avoidance	78%
Post crash	80%

Euro NCAP test results Mercedes-Benz Actros F 6x2 Rigid (2026)
Test	Score
Overall:	5 /5 stars
Safe driving	79%
Crash avoidance	82%
Post crash	80%

Euro NCAP test results Mercedes-Benz Actros F 4x2 Tractor Unit (2026)
Test	Score
Overall:	5 /5 stars
Safe driving	79%
Crash avoidance	82%
Post crash	80%

== eActros ==
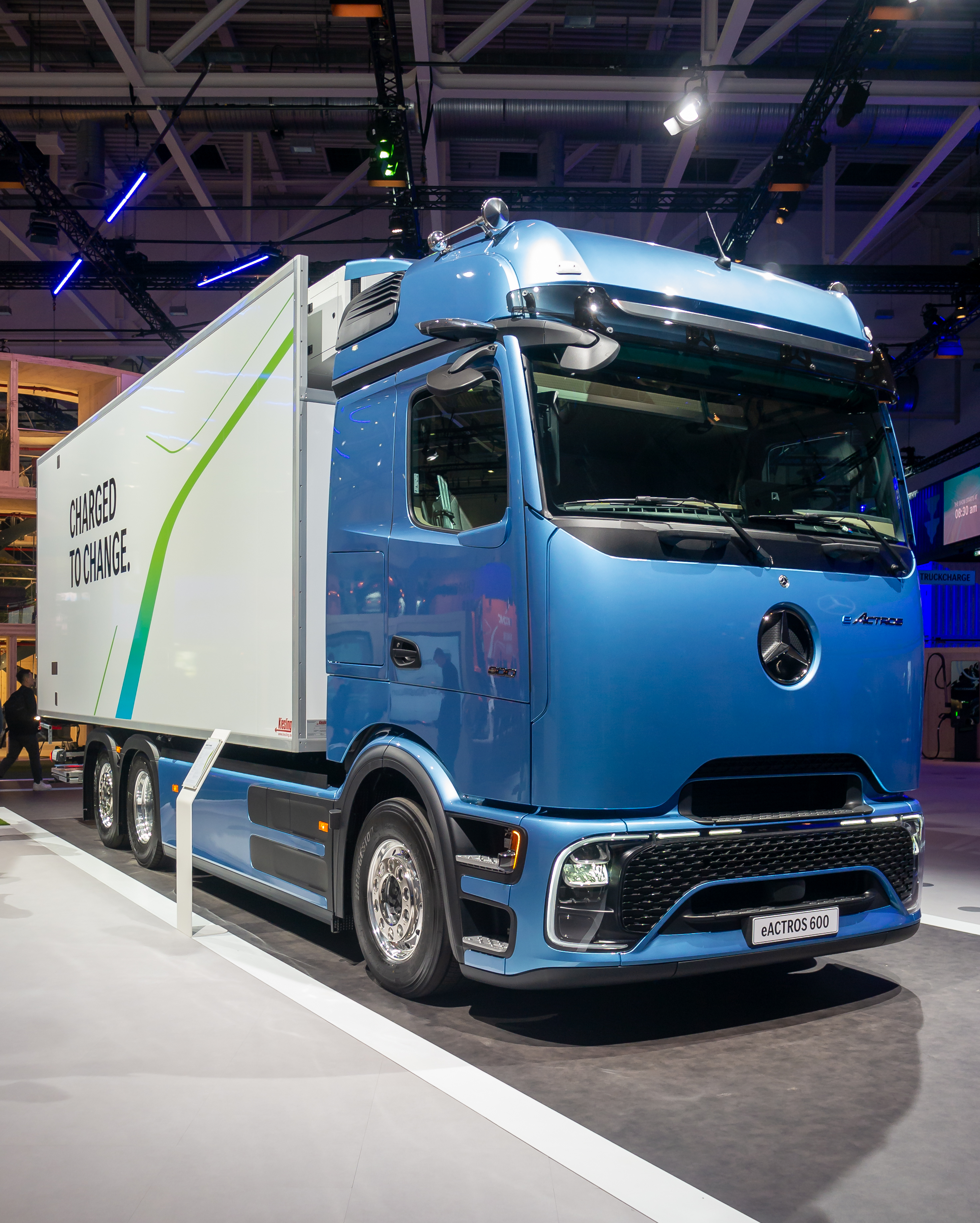
eActros 600 at the IAA Transportation 2024

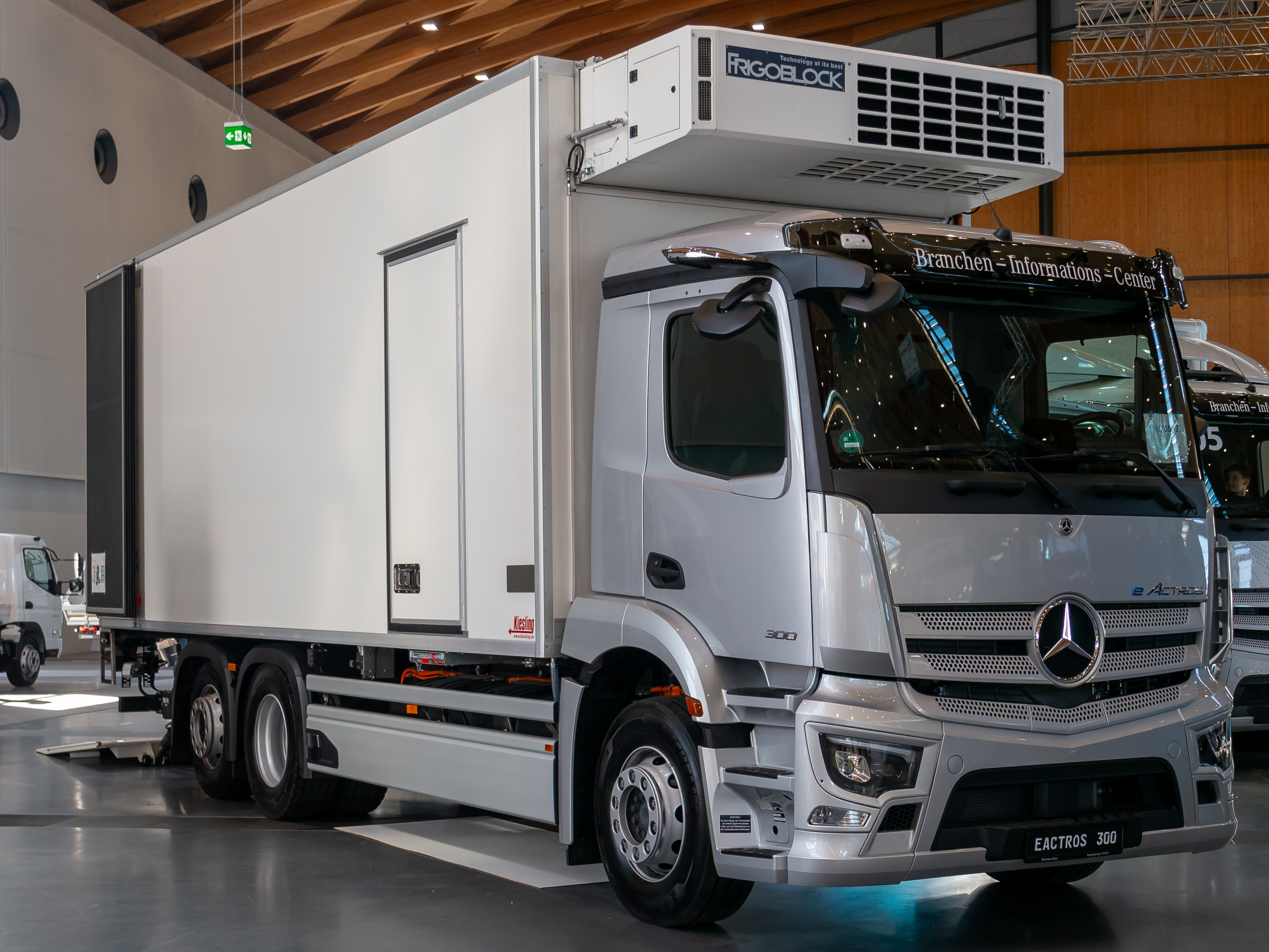
eActros 300 as a three-axle (6×2) chassis with refrigerated box

The electric truck family includes model 300 and 400 delivery trucks and model 600 long-haul semi. Series production of the semi started in November 2024 and the first deliveries to German customers were in December. Online retail giant Amazon ordered 200 model 600 tractors for UK and Germany operations.

== See also ==
- Dump truck
- Tractor unit
- Semi-trailer and semi-trailer truck
- Sisu Polar
- Mitsubishi Fuso Super Great
