= Back-to-back loan =

Loan agreement between entities in two countries

A back-to-back loan is a financial agreement between entities in two countries in which loans are exchanged using different currencies while maintaining the same maturity date. Each party borrows in its local currency and lends an equivalent amount to the other party, helping both sides manage foreign currency needs without directly entering the foreign exchange market.

Most back-to-back loans come due within 10 years, due to their inherent risks. Initiated as a way of avoiding currency regulations, the practice had, by the mid-1990s, largely been replaced by currency swaps.

== Limitations ==
One disadvantage of such agreements is asymmetrical liability - absent a specific agreement, when one party defaults on the loan, the other party may still be held responsible for repayment. Another disadvantage in comparison with currency swaps is that back-to-back loan transactions are customarily recorded on banking institutions' records as liabilities and thereby increase their capitalization requirements, while currency swaps were, during the 2000s, widely exempted from this requirement.

== Relationship to currency swaps ==
Back-to-back loans are closely related to cross-currency swap. The Federal Reserve Bank of Richmond has noted that currency swaps grew out of earlier parallel-loan arrangements in which firms exchanged loans denominated in different currencies in order to obtain foreign-currency funding.

A modern cross-currency swap achieves a similar economic purpose, but does so through a derivatives contract rather than through two separate loan agreements. The European Central Bank describes a cross-currency swap as a transaction in which two parties simultaneously lend and borrow an equivalent amount of money in two different currencies for a specified period of time, with exchanges of both interest payments and principal amounts.

Compared with back-to-back loans, currency swaps generally offer greater flexibility and are easier to intermediate through financial institutions, which contributed to their replacing older parallel-loan structures in many international finance transactions.

== See also ==
- Parallel loan
