= Albany Woollen Mills =

Woollen mill

Coordinates: 35°01′37.8″S 117°52′38″E

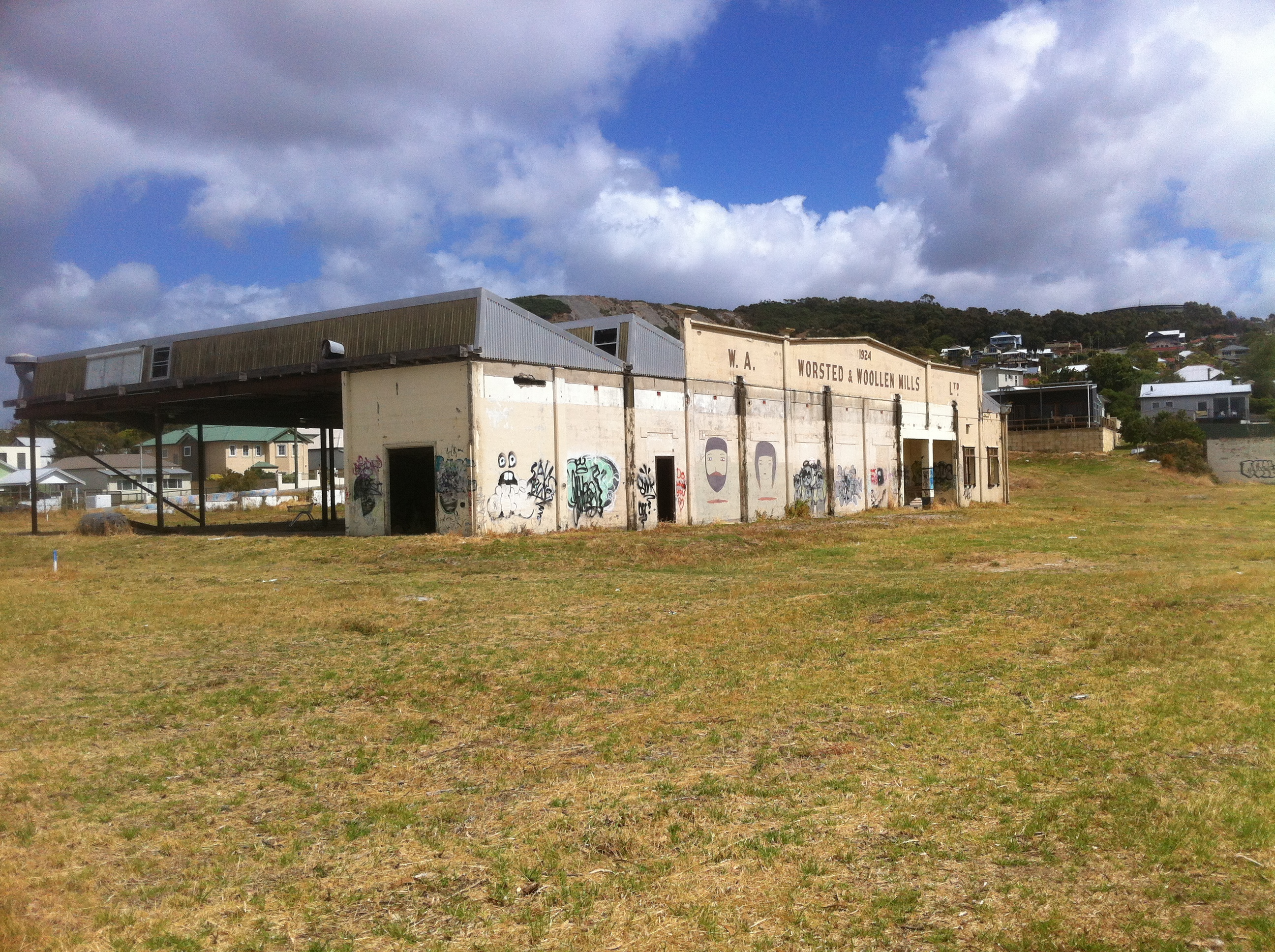
Albany Woollen Mills building, 2017

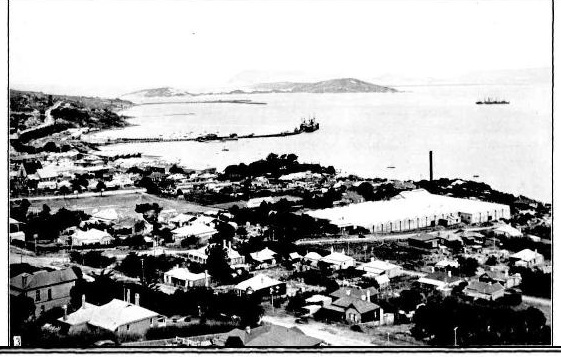
View over white roofed mill and smokestack in 1933

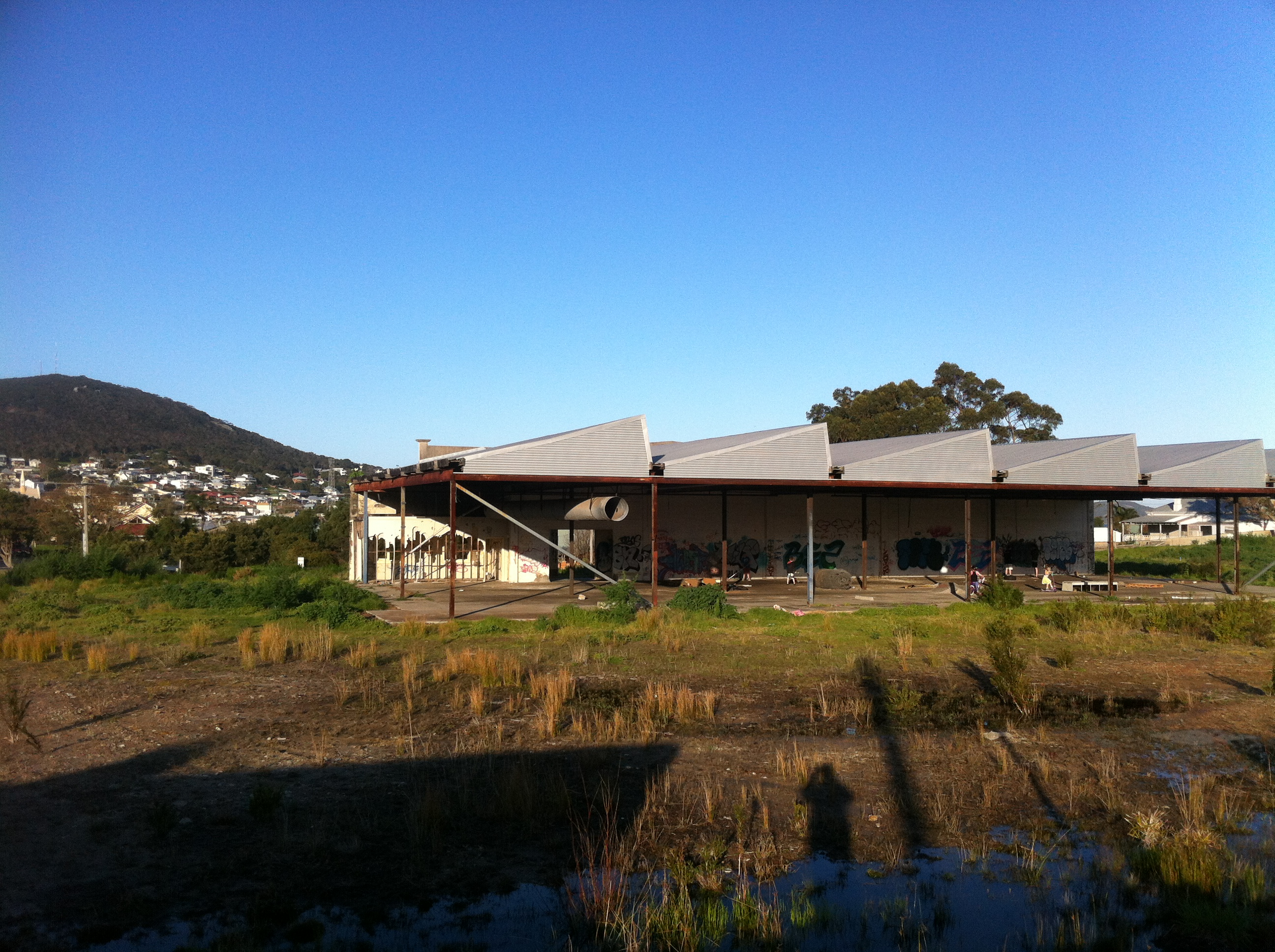
Interior of remaining Woollen Mill building in 2015

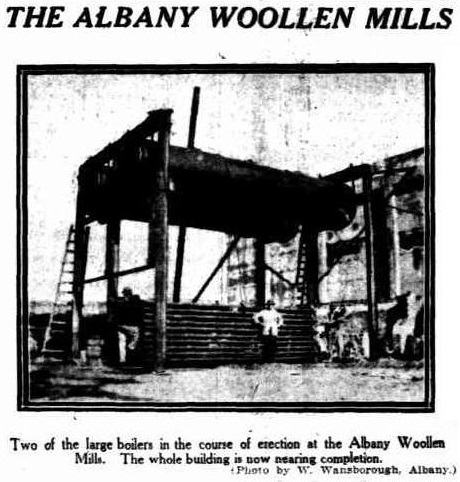
Boilers being erected in 1924

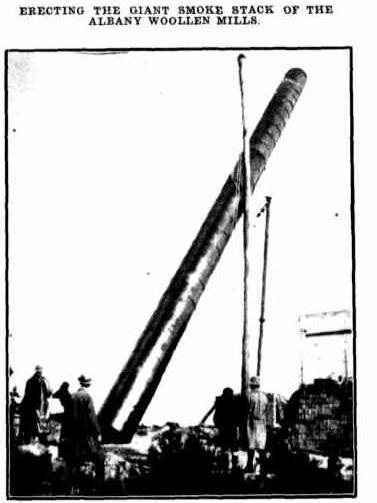
Erecting the smokestack in July 1924

Albany Woollen Mills, also known as the Western Australian Worsted and Woollen Mills Ltd., was a woollen mill located in Albany, Western Australia.

The idea of having a mill in Albany was first proposed in 1920, an article in the Albany Advertiser suggested the town was a strong contender due to the good supply of fresh water and local climatic conditions. A local solicitor, S. G. Haynes, gifted 30 acres (12 ha) of land for the project. In 1921 the Minister of Industry, John Scaddan, announced that Albany had been chosen over sites in Perth, Bunbury and Collie.

The mill was the first woollen mill to be built in the state of Western Australia. Construction commenced in 1923 with a foundation stone laid by the premier, James Mitchell on 7 March. Later the same year a contract was awarded to L. Hinks and Company of Melbourne to build the Mill for £85,000. The cost did not include site levelling or the erection of the power house. Hinks decided to purchase land for the mill adjacent to the railway line at the foot of Mount Melville rejecting the gifted land that was too far from town. The main building had a frontage of 352 feet (107 m) and a width of 166 feet (51 m) with the interior divided into 11 bays. The 16 feet (5 m) high walls are made of reinforced concrete and roof was made of corrugated asbestos held aloft by 60 steel stanchions. Two 400 horsepower Babcock boilers were installed and connected to a 100 feet (30 m) smokestack.

It opened in 1925 as a way to increase employment and bring economic benefits to the Great Southern. The company opened in 1925 with £116,331 owed to shareholders. In 1926 rumours were rife that the mill was on the brink of closing prompting the Chairman of Directors, Ernest Augustus Lee Steere, to express his surprise in local newspapers at the idea.

The mill continued to struggle on making a loss for most of the early years. The site was poorly chosen as the noise and smog were constant problems for the town and the wool produced was too distant from markets. The factory itself was found to be of a poor design and inefficient.

Directors of the mill gave 100 workers a week's notice of dismissal in early 1931 as a result of an overburden of stock. Operations at the mills then stopped for a period of approximately six weeks; the Premier Mitchell reopened the mill after meeting with directors.

The mill employed over 120 workers in 1934 and had an annual turnover of £150,000 compared to £54,000 the year before.

An annual profit of £17,306 was recorded in 1953 followed by a £24,500 profit in 1954. The chairman, F. T. Heron, announced his intention of continuing to build up the efficiency of plant and equipment.

In 1963 the mill was one of four to be awarded a contract to produce a total of 160,000 army blankets worth a total of £400,000.

Robert Holmes à Court acquired the mill in 1970 when it was in danger of closing. Holmes à Court persuaded the state government to waive a A$500,000 loan guarantee in exchange for keeping the mill open; he then turned the business around so that it was financially viable again. Shortly afterward he acquired Bell Brothers Holdings, which, with the mill and his other business interests, were incorporated into Bell Group Limited. The investment arm of Bell Group, J. N. Taylor, sold the Mill in 1988 after Bell had been taken over by Bond Corporation. At the time the mill had annual turnover of A$30 million and was the biggest independent carpet yarn spinning mill in Australia.

The mill was under administration in 1996 with the state government offering assistance to other companies interested in purchasing the operations. The Regional Development Minister, Hendy Cowan, was keen to see the mills become a more vertically integrated wool processing company that manufactured more than yarn.

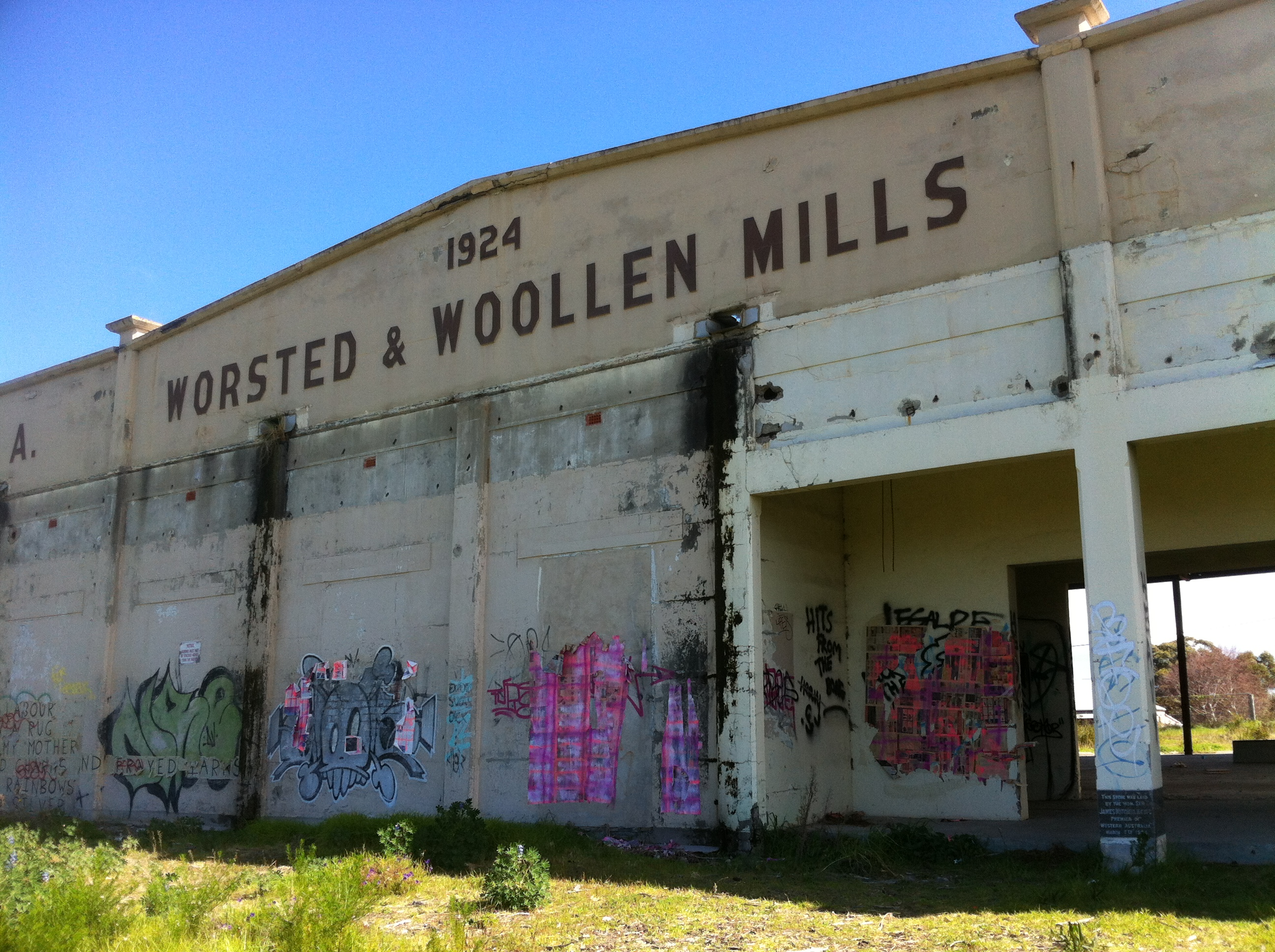
Facade of Albany Woollen Mills 2015

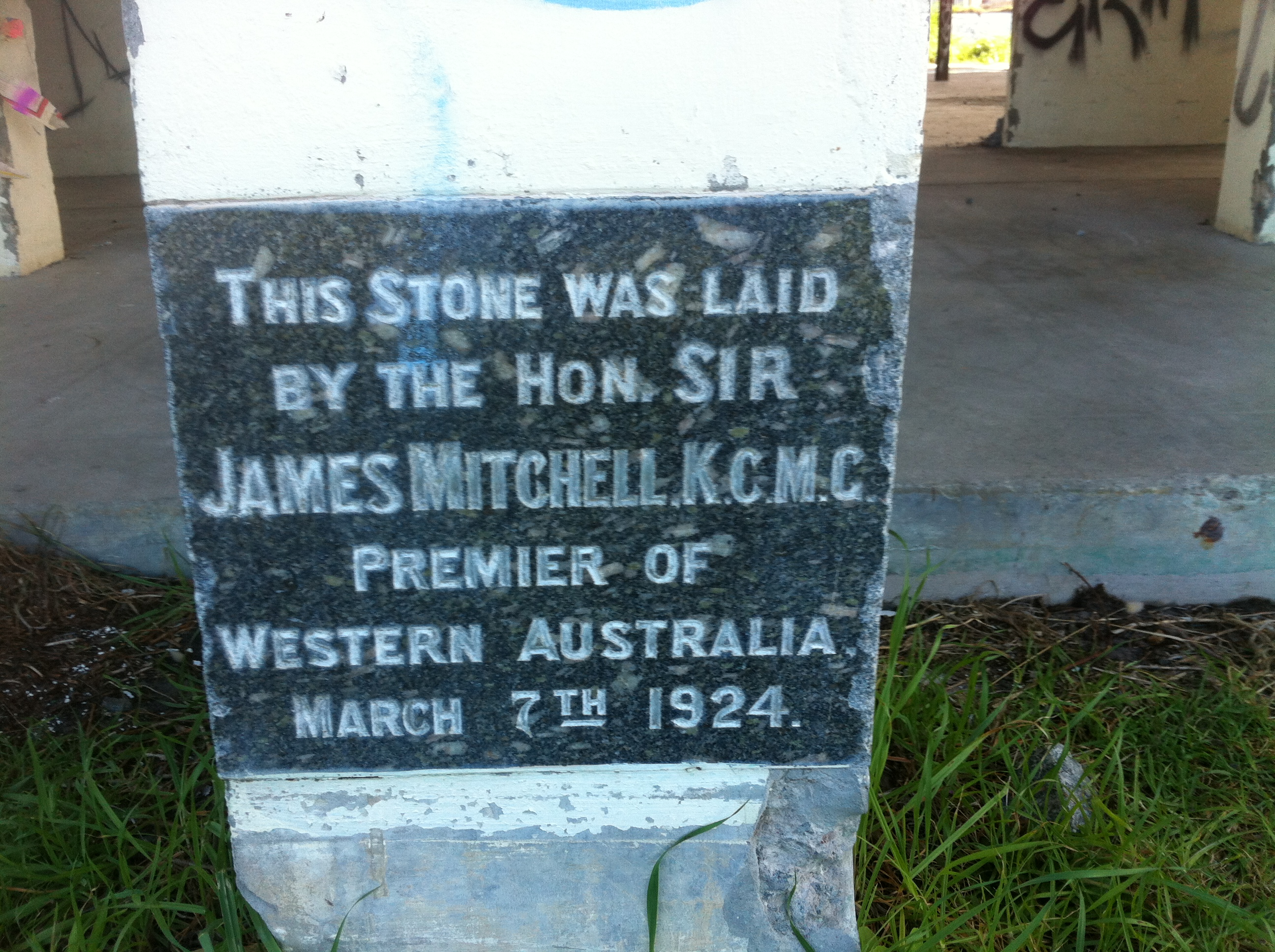
Foundation stone

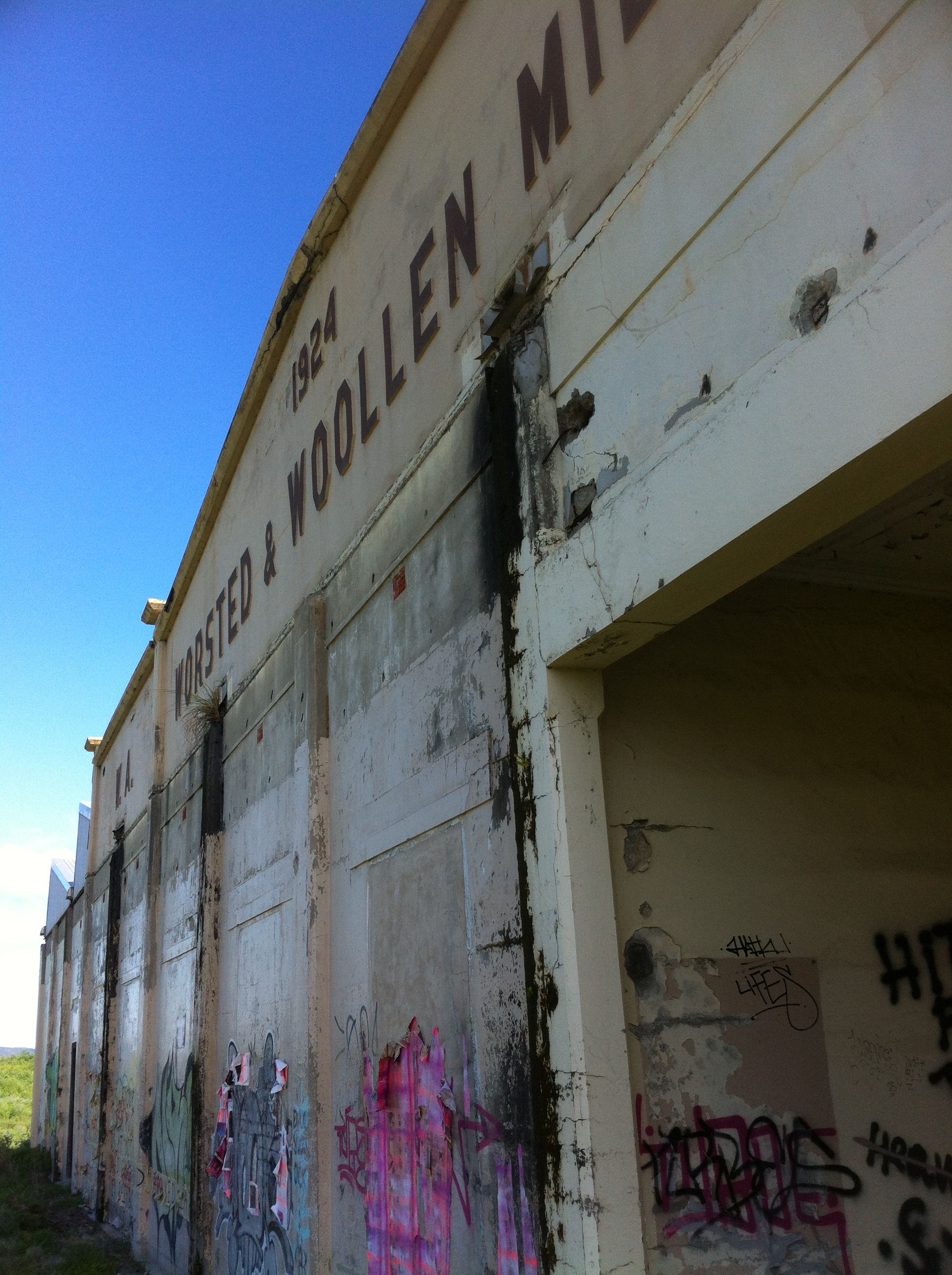
Albany Woollen Mills facade

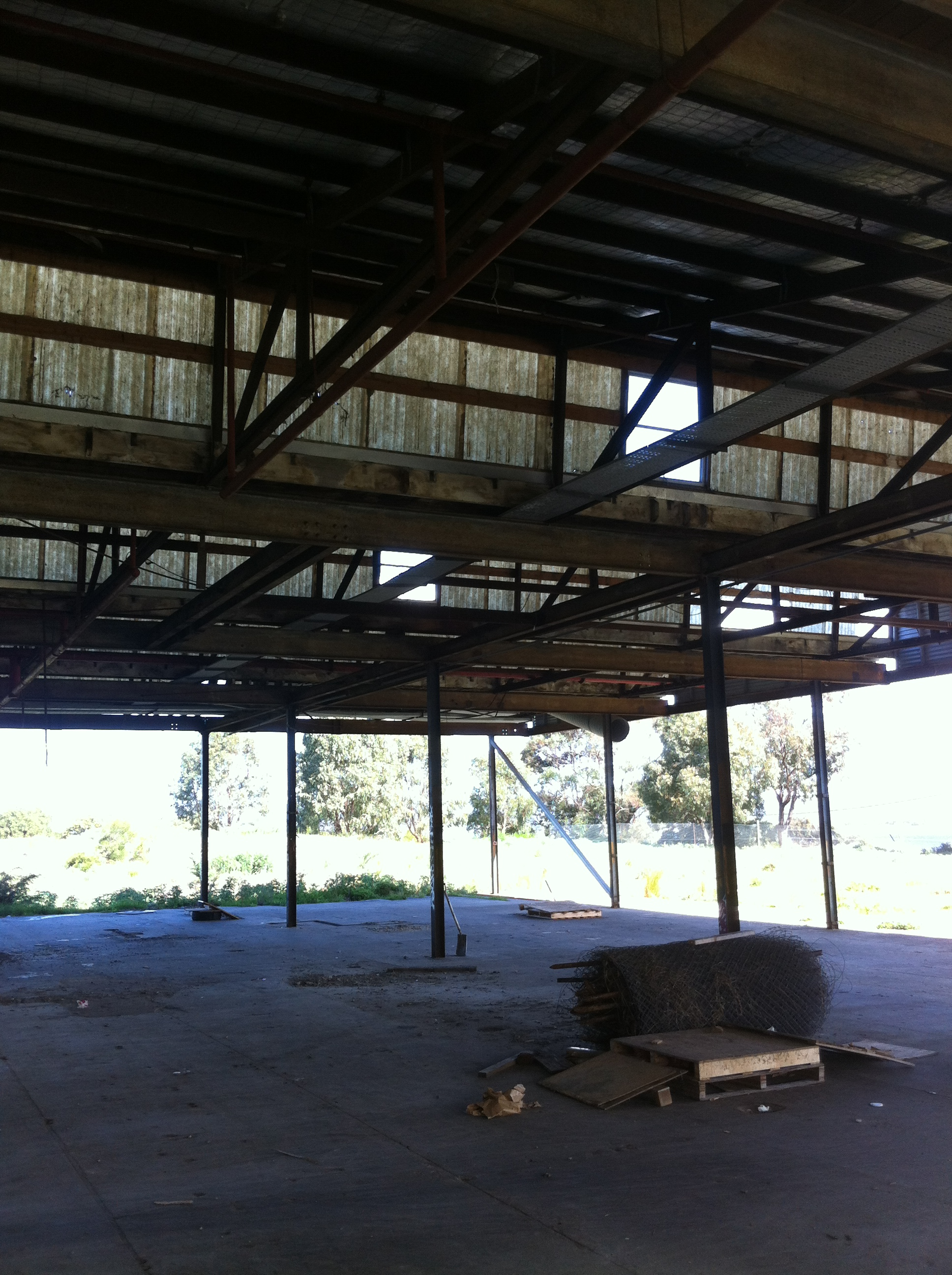
Interior of mill 2015

== See also ==
List of places on the State Register of Heritage Places in the City of Albany
