= R141 =

R141 or R-141 may refer to:

- Quebec Route 141, Canada
- Sisu R-141, a Finnish lorry
- R141, a road in Bangladesh
- R141, a part of the Red Trail on the Via Alpina hiking trail network
- R141, the contract number of a R-type contract in the New York City Subway
- R-141, a route in Russia
