= Sisu KB-46 =

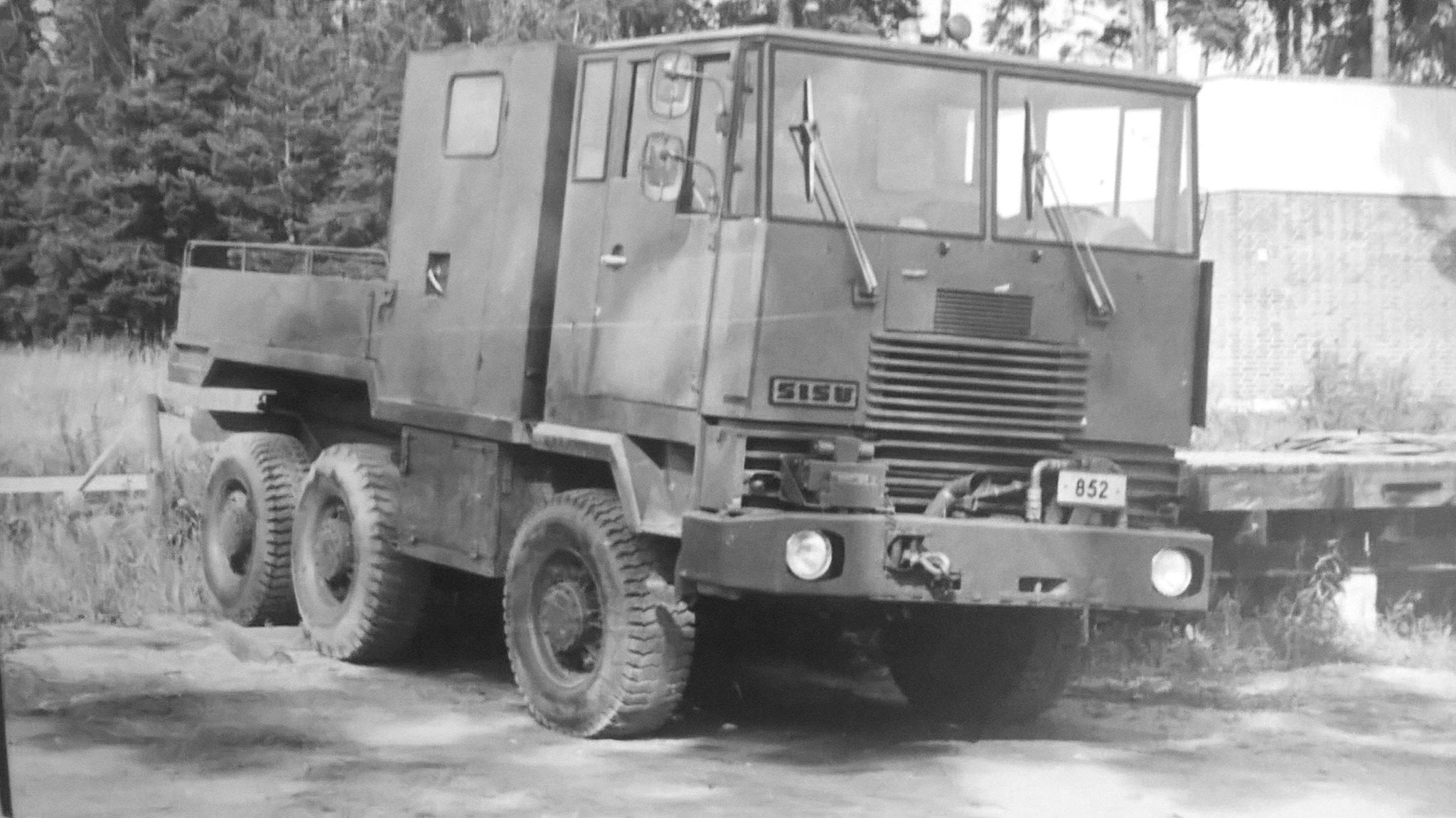

Overview
- Manufacturer: Oy Suomen Autoteollisuus Ab
- Production: 1968
- Assembly: Karis, Finland

Powertrain
- Engine: Leyland O.801; 13.12 L, 275 hp

Dimensions
- Kerb weight: 8,000 kg

Sisu KB-46 is a prototype of a three-axle, six-wheel-driven off-road lorry made by the Finnish heavy vehicle producer Suomen Autoteollisuus (SAT) in 1968. Its capacity is three tonnes and it was produced after an assignment of the Finnish Defence Forces to tow heavy cannons.

== Technical data ==
The vehicle is powered by a 13.12-litre V8 Leyland O.801 engine, of which Sisu model code is BY. KB-46 was the first Sisu powered by this engine type.

The chassis is built on a rigid tubular frame which also consists the fuel tank. The vehicle is equipped with Sisu Nemo hydraulic transmission system for trailer.

The axles are equipped with CTI system and special Goodyear tyres with an extra small air volume.

The prototype got a rectangular shaped concept cabin that came later into production in Sisu M-series. An additional cabin for crew was installed in the Defence Forces' Transportation Vehicle Depot.

The vehicle kerb weight is 8,000 kg and the payload in terrain is just 3,000 kg. The maximum weight for a normal trailer is 5,000–7,000 kg and for a driven trailer 7,000–10,000 kg.

== Characteristics ==
The prototype vehicle toured with a Tampella 122 K 60 cannon, fitted with hydraulic drive, in agricultural fairs in Finland where it was displayed at the Defence Forces' stand. Neither the vehicle, nor the cannon entered serial production; KB-46 was designed in a short time and there was used many new technical solutions without previous experience. Hence, there appeared several defects. Also the engine type proved technically failed.

KB-46 was never homologated but the prototype stayed in use of the Defence Forces. The military personnel got frustrated at repairing the vehicle which was repeatedly broken and deliberately procrastinated its repairing in the 1970s until it was, after standing useless for a few years at the depot, taken to a museum.
