= Sisu A-45 =

Finnish off-road lorry

Sisu A-45 and AH-45
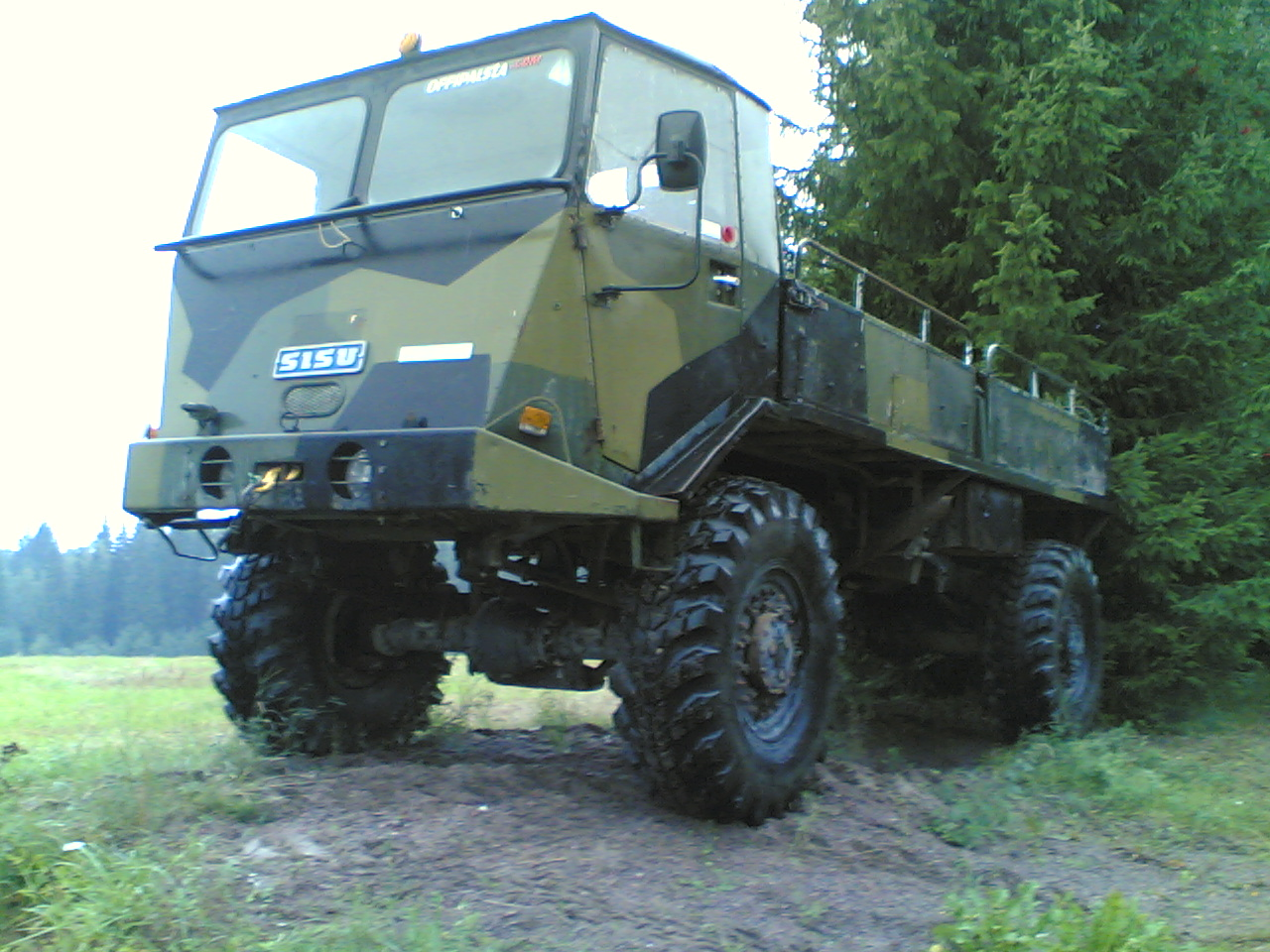

Overview
- Manufacturer: Oy Suomen Autoteollisuus Ab
- Also called: "Proto-Sisu"
- Production: 1970–1982
- Assembly: Hämeenlinna and Karis, Finland

Body and chassis
- Class: light off-road lorry
- Body style: platform lorry

Powertrain
- Engine: L6 direct injection diesel: naturally aspirated: 103 kW /2600 1/min; turbocharged: 110 kW /2600 1/min
- Transmission: manual, synchronised 5+1; two-step reduction gear

Dimensions
- Wheelbase: 3 400 mm
- Length: 5 700 mm
- Width: 2 300 mm
- Height: cabin: 2 440 mm; with canopy: 2 800 mm
- Kerb weight: 5 000 kg

Chronology
- Predecessor: Sisu KB-45
- Successor: Sisu SA-150

Sisu A-45 is a light off-road lorry made by the Finnish heavy vehicle producer Suomen Autoteollisuus (SAT) in 1970–1982. The two-axle, all-wheel-drive vehicle with payload of 4 150 kg was a further development of Sisu KB-45, that was originally developed after an assignment of the Finnish Defence Forces.

== Development ==
A-45 based technically on its predecessor KB-45. The most significant difference was that the Kirkstall axles were substituted by Sisu's own axles.

== Production and use ==
The predecessor KB-45 was produced in SAT Karis works. In 1969 SAT merged with Vanaja and when A-45 was presented in 1970 the production of Sisu military vehicles was moved to the former Vanaja works in Hämeenlinna. However, some of the A-45's were made in Karis due to occasional lack of production capacity in Hämeenlinna.

Just like KB-45, A-45 is informally called Proto. The name is derived from the Finnish word prototyyppi (prototype).

The "Proto's" are substituted in Finnish army by 2008 presented Sisu A2045 lorries.

== Technical data ==
=== Engine ===
The engine is a six-in-line diesel with direct injection. The naturally aspirated version gives an output of 103 kW and torque of 393 Nm, the stronger version equipped with turbocharger has got 110 kW maximum output and 468 Nm torque.

=== Transmission and understructure ===
The main gearbox contains five speed forward of which all are synchronised and one reverse gear. In addition, the vehicle is equipped with a two-step reduction gear. Both axles are driven and equipped with planetary hub reduction and differential locks. The front axle drive engagement works pneumatically and can be used during driving. Suspension is carried out with leaf springs, the front axle has got also shock absorbers. The service brakes are air operated and the hand brake works by releasing of the air pressure.

=== Chassis ===
Steering is assisted by a hydraulic servo. Both axles are with single tyres size of 14.5–20". Fuel capacity is 210 litres. The direct current electrical system is equipped with an 840-Watt, 24-Volt generator. There are two 145 Ah batteries. A towing bracket at the rear end. A reconnaissance winch of 6.5-ton capacity and 60-metre cable length is mounted as standard and it can be used both in front and rear end of the vehicle.

=== Cabin and platform ===
The cabin is made from steel and glass fibre and its top is detachable. All windows are made from safety glass and the side windows as well as the windscreen are openable. There are seats for driver and two passengers; the driver's seat is adjustable. The gauge panel is comprehensive, including a revolution counter.

The platform structure is made from steel, the bottom is made from plastic impregnated wood. Access is from rear end and the platform is equipped with a detachable canopy with steel structure.

== Characteristics ==
The vehicle capacity is 4 150 kg and the maximum weight of trailer is 4 000 kg on road and in plain terrain. In difficult terrain the maximum load is limited to 2 500 kg and the trailer weight to 2 000 kg. The turning radius is 700 cm measured at the outer front wheel. Both the maximum angle of approach and departure are 38° and ground clearance is 340 mm.

== Variations ==
As with the KB-45, the A-45 also has a version with Nemo hydraulic system that enables pulling of trailers with hydraulically driven axles. These vehicles were called AH-45. The hydraulic system increases the hauling capacity so that the maximum weight for a single axle trailer is 8 000 kg and 12 000 kg for a two-axle trailer.
