= Sisu SA-240 =

Finnish off-road lorry

Sisu SA-240 and SA-241
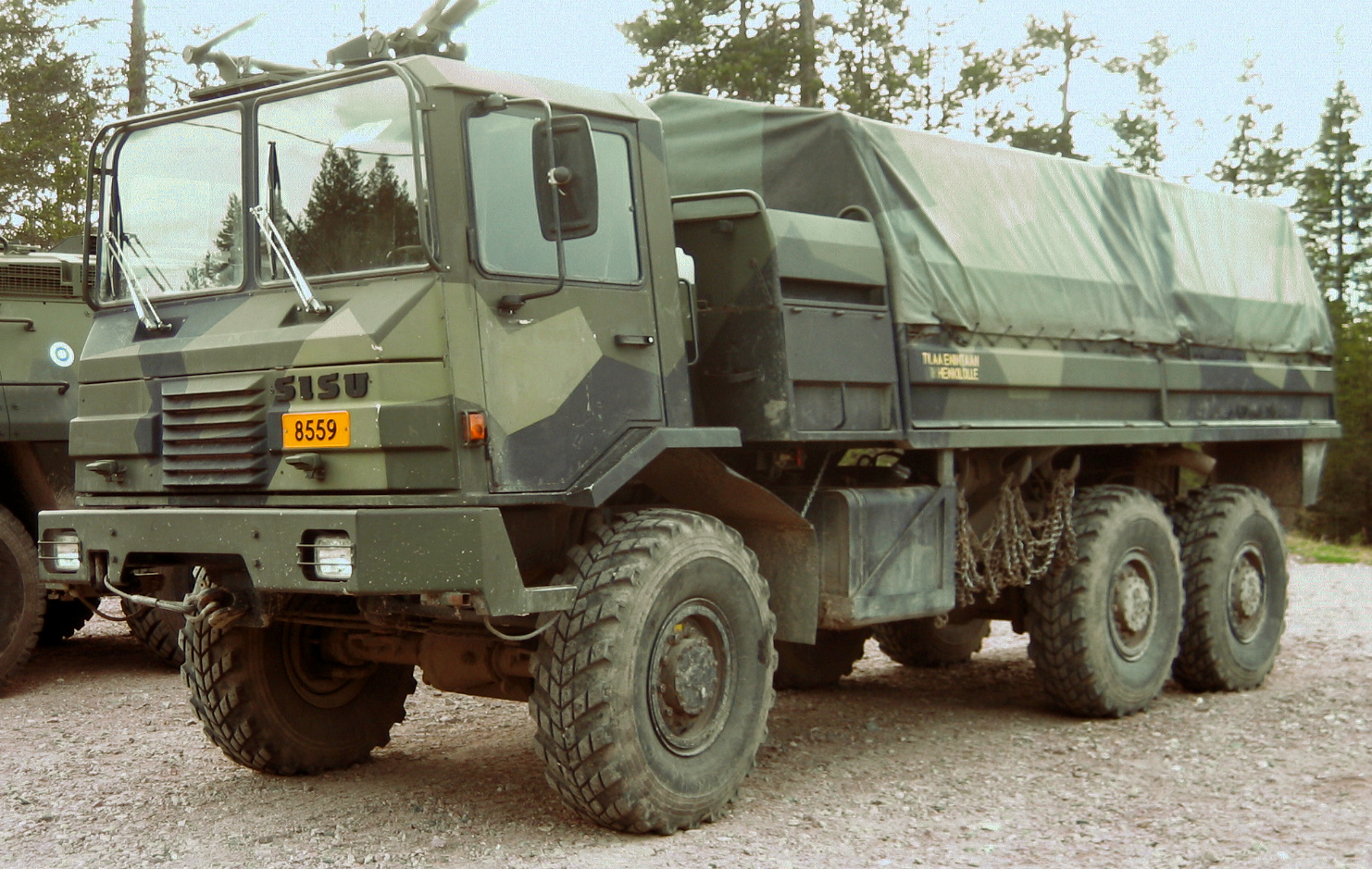

Overview
- Manufacturer: Oy Sisu-Auto Ab
- Also called: Raskas Masi, "Rasi"
- Production: SA-240: 1984–1990; SA-241: 1990–1991
- Assembly: Hämeenlinna, Finland

Body and chassis
- Class: heavy off-road lorry
- Body style: platform lorry
- Related: Sisu SA-150

Powertrain
- Engine: Cummins LTA 10 330T/T4 diesel
- Transmission: ZF 8F1R, torque converter

Dimensions
- Length: 7,800 mm
- Width: 2,500 mm
- Height: 3,100 mm
- Kerb weight: 10,000 kg

Sisu SA-240 is a heavy off-road lorry made by the Finnish heavy vehicle manufacturer Oy Sisu-Auto Ab from 1984 until 1991. The six-wheel drive lorry with payload of 12,000 kg was developed for pulling of heavy cannons of the Finnish Defence Forces.

== Development ==
The Sisu SA-150 medium size off-road lorry turned out to be too weak to pull the heaviest, domestic made cannons of the Finnish Defence Forces. A new 6×6 lorry was suggested as a solution. The development work began in 1983. The first two prototypes, called SA-180, were powered by turbocharged Valmet 611 engines with a maximum output of 180 kW. The transmission, made by ZF, was equipped with a torque converter which enabled flexible driving on road and terrain. The system was tested by driving a test vehicle from Hämeenlinna to Sodankylä with the same gear.

After field tests were completed the engines were replaced by 10-litre Cummins diesels and the model code was changed to SA-240. The vehicle was soon nicknamed Rasi, which came from Raskas Masi, "heavy Masi".

== Production ==
The first factory produced SA-240, configuration Sisu SA240 CKH-6×6/4950+1440, was handed over to the Finnish Defence Forces in May 1984. The vehicle was built with an extra long wheelbase and equipped with a detachable anti-ship missile system MtO 85. The first SA-240 made for artillery use, configuration Sisu SA 240 CKH-6×6/3740+1440, was handed over at the end of the following year. In 1987 a series of 13 vehicles was produced and serial production began in 1988. SA-240 was replaced by further developed SA-241 in 1990, but the production ceased already in 1991.

== Technical data ==
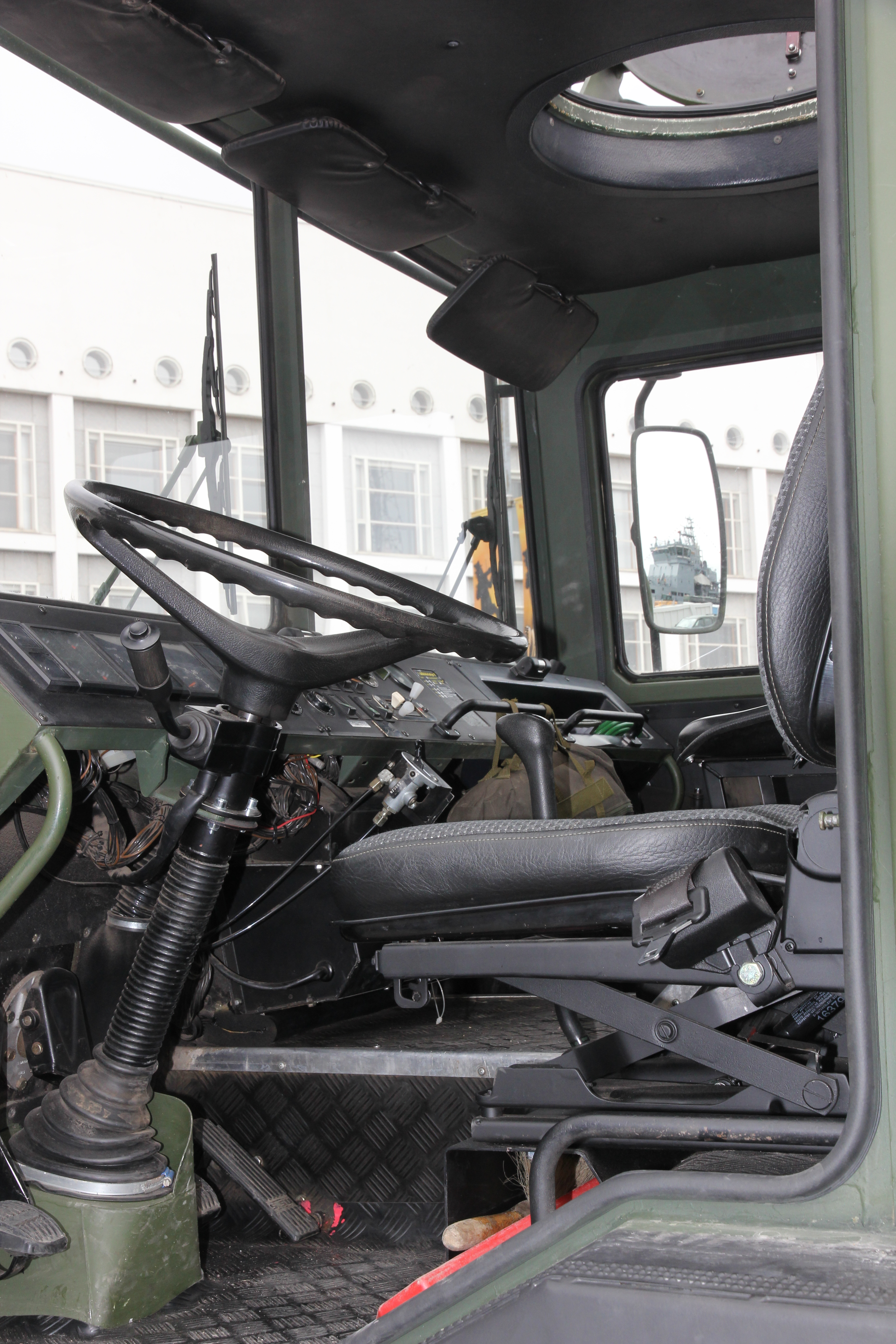
Interior of SA-240

The SA-240 is based mainly on the lighter, two-axle SA-150.

=== Engine, transmission and chassis ===
The vehicle is powered by Cummins LTA 10 330T/T4 diesel engine with an output of 246 kW. The ZF 8F1R transmission is equipped with an integrated torque converter. All the three axles are driven. The wheelbase between the rear axles used to be the longest in market to enable use of snow chains. The chassis is twisting type.

The kerb weight is 8,800 kg and payload is 9,200 kg in the early models. Later models weight 10,000 kg and they are classified to carry load of 12,000 kg.

=== Cabin and superstructures ===
The cabin is mounted over engine and contains seats for driver and two passengers. A heater and a roof hatch are fitted. The platform can carry 24–30 troops and it is covered by a tarpaulin which is supported by a steel frame.

During peacetime however, the maximum number of passengers is limited to 16 due to the space required by the seating modules which must be used during personnel transport.

== Characteristics ==
The top speed of SA-240 is 97 km/h and its range is 600 km. The cross-country mobility is good due to bending frame and good weight distribution. The maximum gradient is 60% and side slope 40%. The vehicle can climb on 0.6 m high step and cross a one metre wide trench. The fording depth is one metre.

== Variations ==
The further development, SA-241 produced in 1990–1991, has got a 100 mm wider platform. Some design changes were introduced in the front end and side boxes. A base for a 12.7 calibre machine gun was mounted on the top of the cabin.

== Usage ==
The main purpose of SA-240 is towing of the heaviest cannons in Finnish Defence Forces.

== Gallery ==
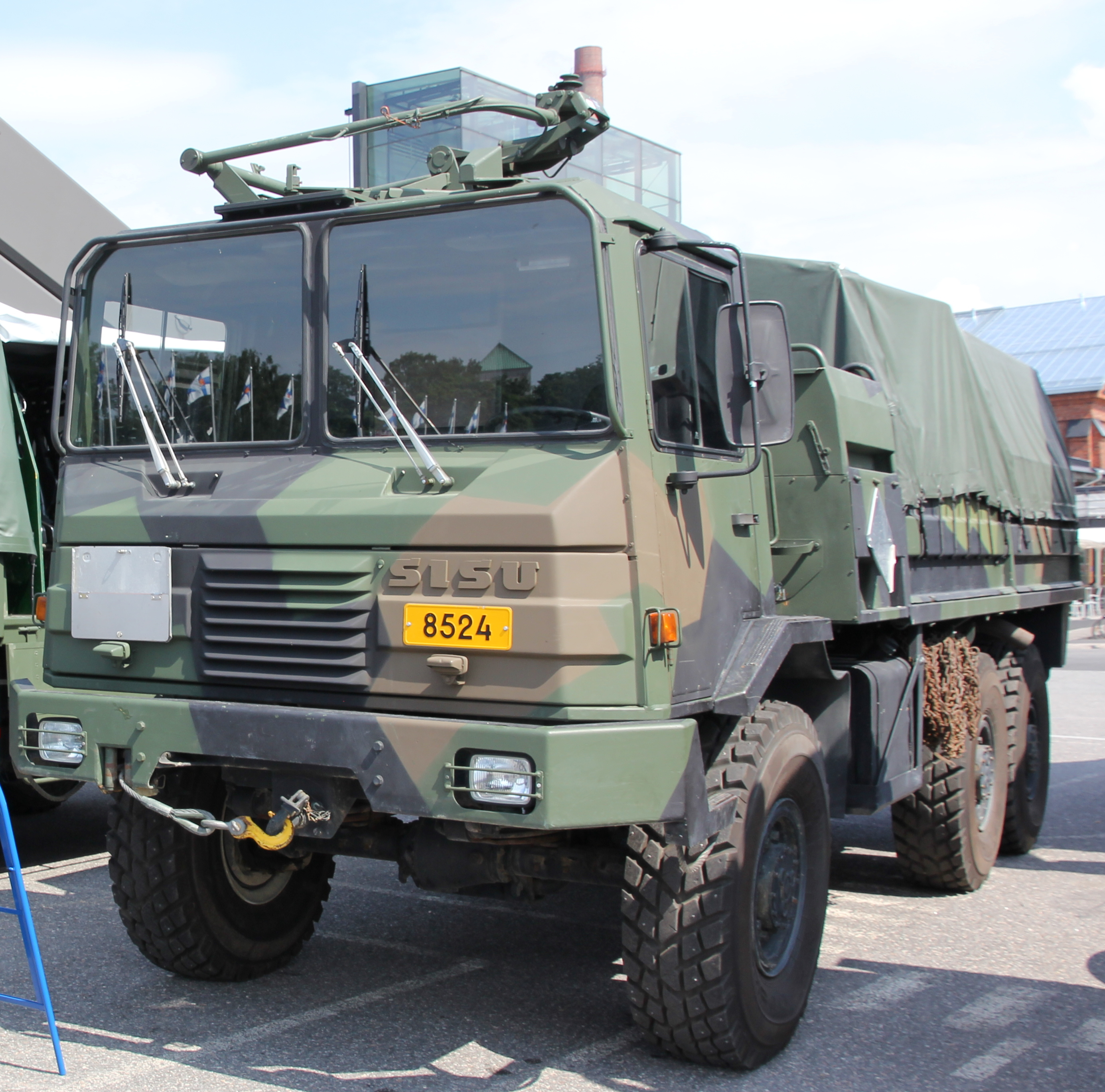
Front view

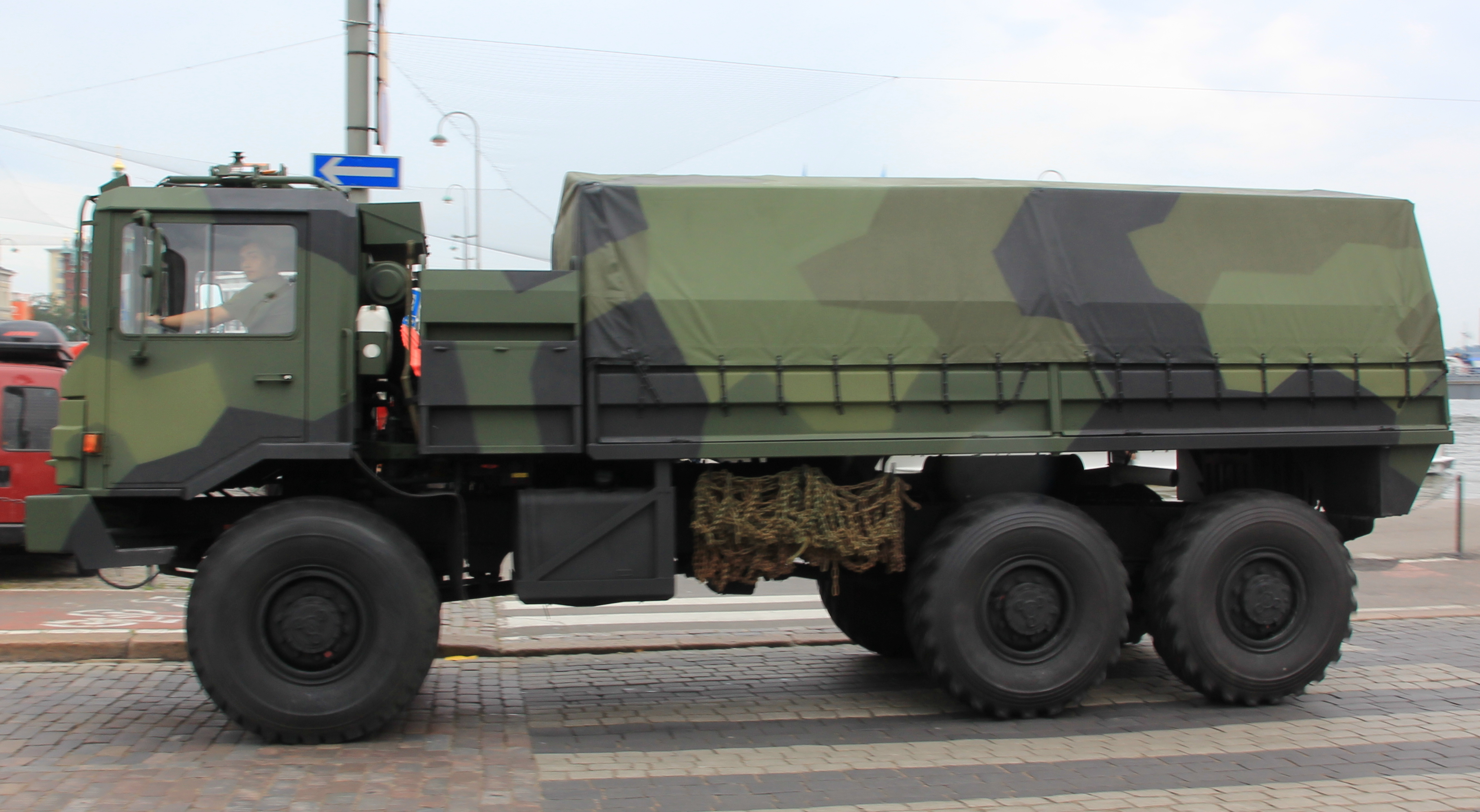
Side view

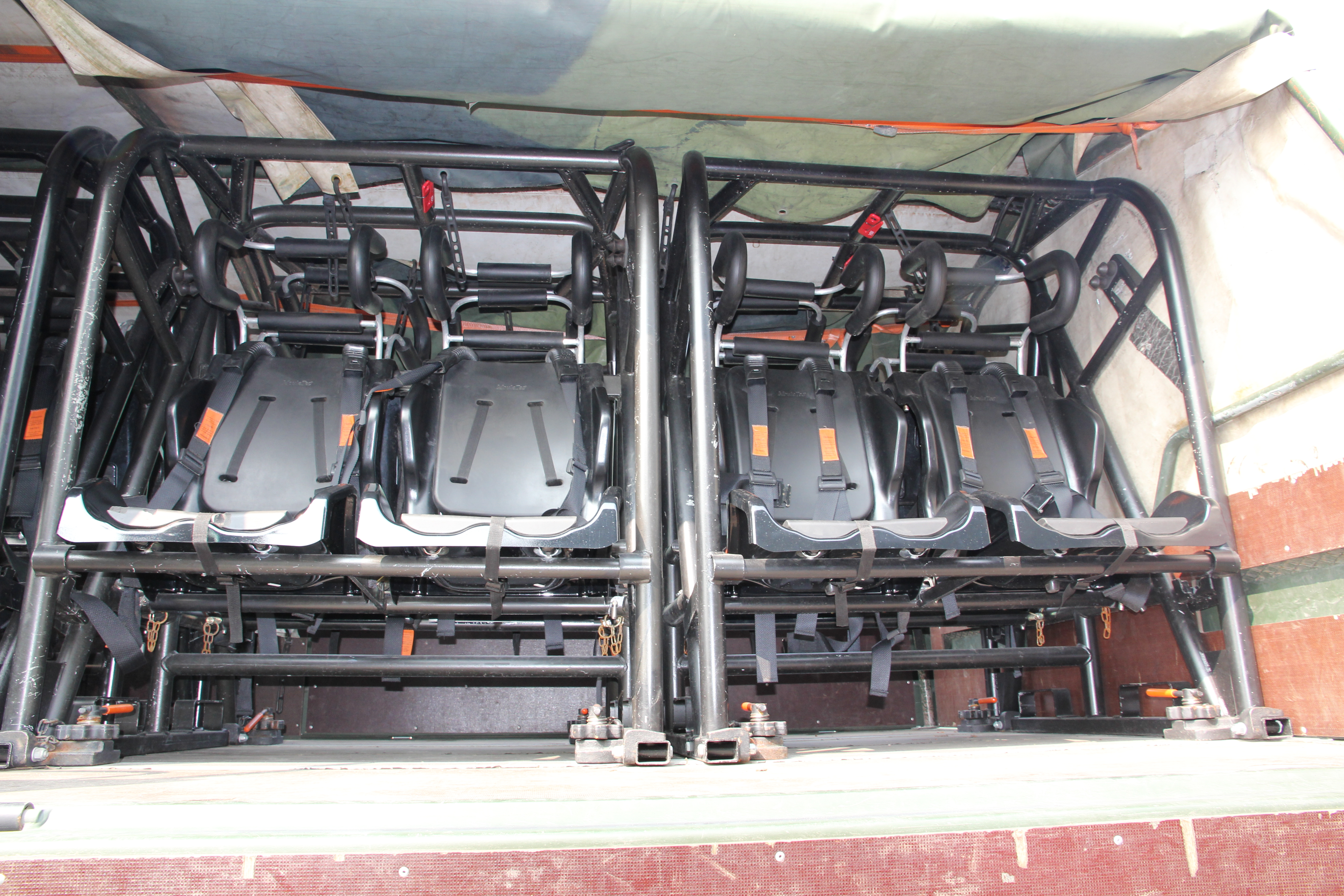
Equipped as troop carrier

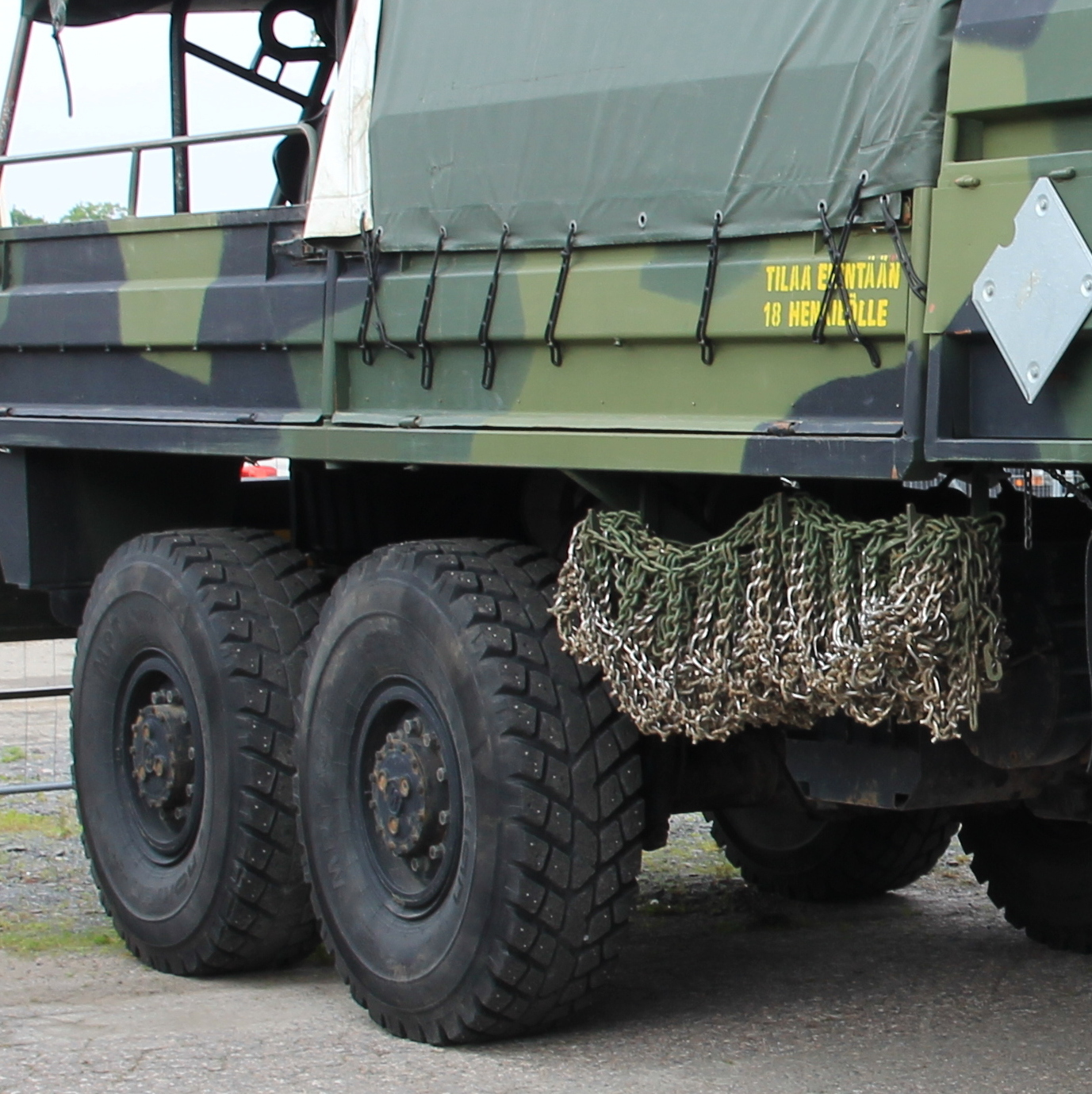
Permanently carried snow chains

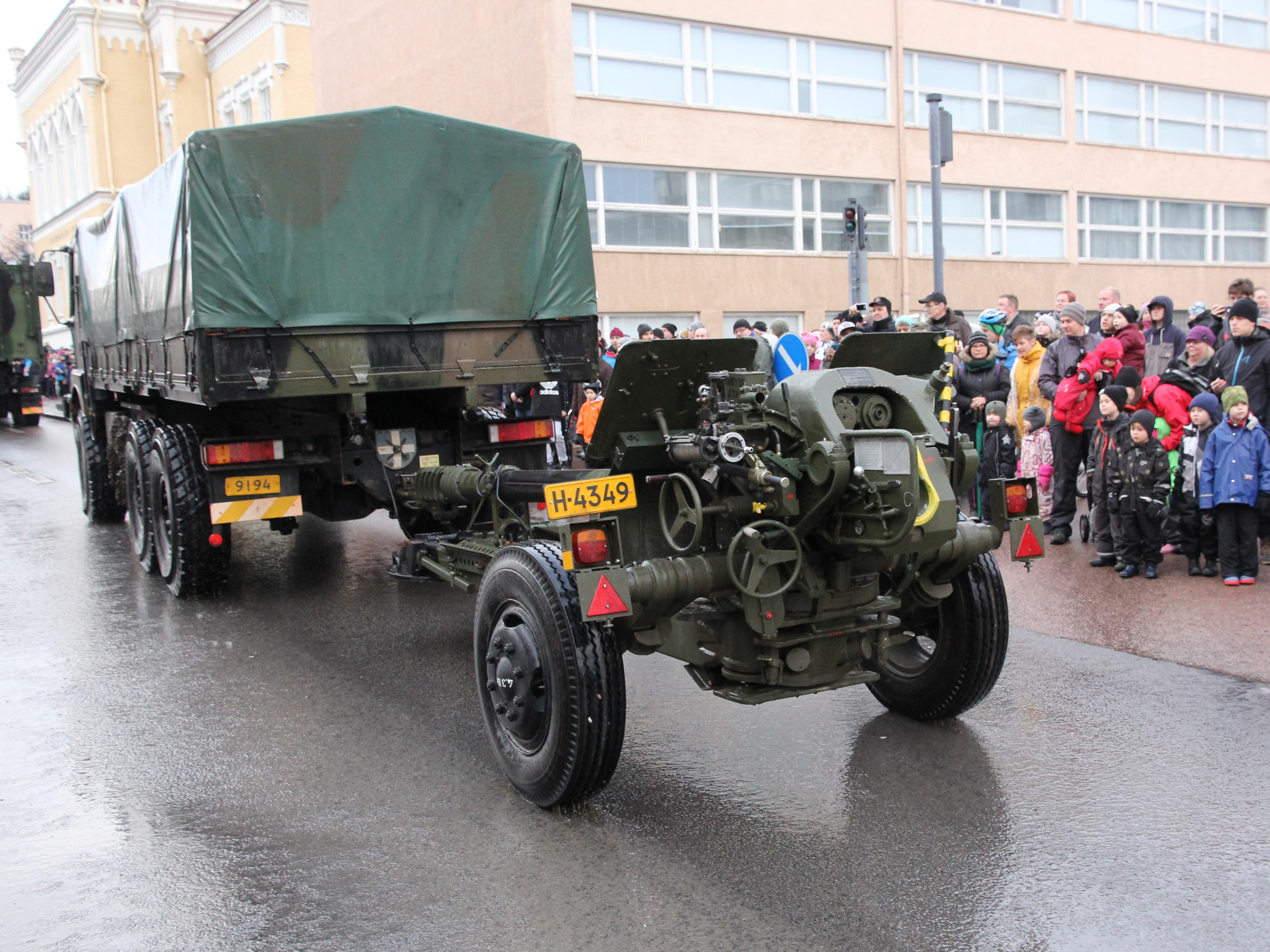
SA-240 towing a 122 mm howitzer
