= Sisu KB-112 =

Sisu KB-112 and KB-117
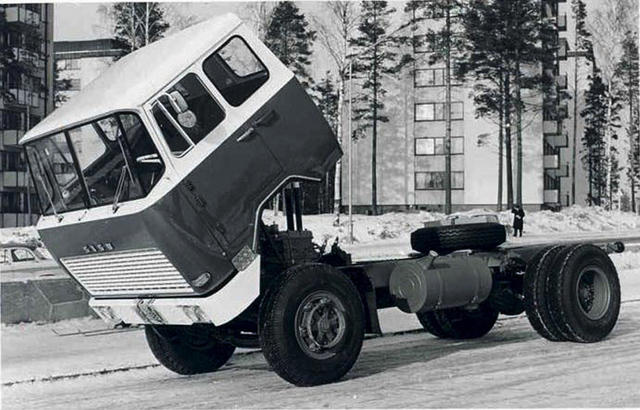
- Sisu KB-117

Overview
- Manufacturer: Oy Suomen Autoteollisuus Ab
- Also called: Jyry-Sisu
- Production: KB-112: 1962–1969; KB-117: 1964–1969
- Assembly: Karis, Finland

Body and chassis
- Body style: forward control
- Layout: KB-112: 6×2; KB-117: 4×2

Powertrain
- Engine: Leyland 0.680; 11.1-litre L6: SP: 165 hp (SAE); BP: 210 hp (SAE); BPT: 265 hp /2200 1/min
- Transmission: ZF, 6-speed, non-synchronised

Dimensions
- Wheelbase: KB-112: 4 500 mm + 1 200 mm
- Length: KB-112: 9 250 mm
- Width: 2 500 mm
- Kerb weight: KB-112: 7 300 kg

Chronology
- Successor: Sisu M-series

Sisu KB-112 is a three-axle lorry made by the Finnish heavy vehicle manufacturer Suomen Autoteollisuus (SAT) from 1962 though 1969. The vehicle was equipped with a technically advanced tiltable cabin. A two-axle variant, the KB-117, was produced from 1964 through 1969. Both versions were only produced in small numbers.

The KB-112 and KB-117 were followed by the Sisu M-series.

== Planning ==
International road transportation grew heavily in the 1960s. The shortest way from Finland to Central and Western Europe was over the Baltic Sea. However, as sea transportation of vehicles was not developed enough yet, the Finnish lorries often drove to Central Europe through Scandinavia, driving around the sea through Haparanda. The conventional long-nosed vehicles available at the time were not sufficient for a such long time travelling. The only way to sleep in the cabin was on the floor, next to the gear lever.

Short-nosed vehicles were common in the UK due to local restrictions of vehicle length. These vehicles were noticed by Finnish Sisu drivers, who asked SAT for a COE vehicle which would help to maximise the load area and have proper space for a driver's bed.

The design of a short-nosed vehicle was not significant step for SAT, as the company had previously designed for the state the KB-102/KB-107 models with a fixed cabin over engine. As a small manufacturer, SAT listened carefully to the signals from its customers. The company set a new project with an urgent status for a modern, state-of-the-art COE model. The main goal was to ensure easy access to the engine for maintenance and repairs. The cabin was a simple design, but it was furnished with a proper bed placed behind the seats, and making it tiltable enabled straightforward service. Cabin ergonomics, primarily the driving position and instrument panel layout, were developed based on interviews of more than one hundred lorry drivers.

The KB-112 was the first European serial produced lorry with a hydraulically tiltable cabin.

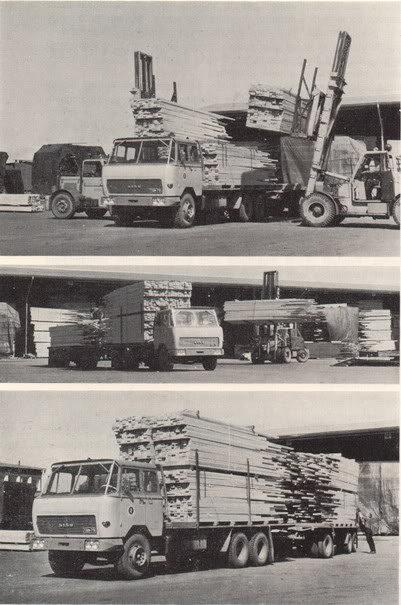
Sisu KB-112 hauling timber in a brochure from 1963

== Production ==
The first KB-112 lorries were produced and tested in 1962 and handed over to W. Rosenlew & Co. Oy in January 1963 in a special ceremony, in which representatives of the press were present. SAT advertised that it had developed a COE vehicle in which all the positive attributes of the arrangement were kept whereas the negative ones were eliminated. The Rosenlew representative, Mr. A. Vaarne, told that compared to a conventional cabin with a bed inside the new cabin type enabled a 3 m^{2} larger load area within the limits of the contemporary legislation. The vehicles transported timber from Seikku sawmill to Mäntyluoto harbour in Pori.

The two-axle KB-117, already with a stronger engine, entered market in 1964. SAT ceased to offer KB models in 1969; however, it is possible that some vehicles were made by special request. The new M-series took the place of them in 1970. There are no exact records about the total quantity produced but it is estimated to be between 50 and 70 units.

== Technical data ==
=== Engine ===
The original engine was a six-cylinder inline diesel Leyland O.680 with a displacement of 11.1 litres and an output of 165 horsepower (SAE). The models with this engine could be recognised from model name extension SP. The two-axle version came to market with a stronger engine as KB-117 BP; BP indicates the stronger PowerPlus version of the same engine type with a 210-horsepower output. Later a turbocharged variation of the latter model was added in the selection; the engine code was then BPT.

=== Transmission ===
The clutch is pneumatically operated. The gearbox is a non-synchronised six-speed ZF. In addition, the driven rear axle is equipped with an integrated two-speed reduction gear system. The tyre size is 11.00-20". At least one KB-112 logging vehicle, made for A. Ahlström, was equipped with Sisu Nemo hydraulic transmission system for trailers.

=== Cabin ===
The steel cabin is mounted over the engine. It is hinged from its front end and can be tilted forward in 20 seconds by a hydraulic system operated by a hand pump. There are seats for the driver and one passenger. The steering wheel can be adjusted in range of 7 cm forward and backward. The 220 cm wide cabin is equipped with a full-length and 50 cm wide bed placed behind the seats and fastened to the chassis at three points. The instrumentation includes an electrically operated speedometer and a tachometer.

== Characteristics ==
The total weight of KB-112 is 17.5 tonnes and with a fully loaded trailer 30 tonnes. The turning radius of 8.4 metres is, according to SAT, two metres smaller compared to an equivalent vehicle with a conventional cabin.

The total weight of KB-117 is 12.5 tonnes.

== Remaining specimens ==
One KB-117 BP is fully restored. As of 2010 it is the only known specimen of its kind in the Finnish vehicle register.

== Sources ==
- Mäkipirtti, Markku. Sisu. Ajoneuvot Suomessa (in Finnish). Vol. 4 (2. ed.). Tampere: Apali Oy. ISBN 978-952-5877-05-2.
