= Sisu SA-150 =

Finnish off-road lorry

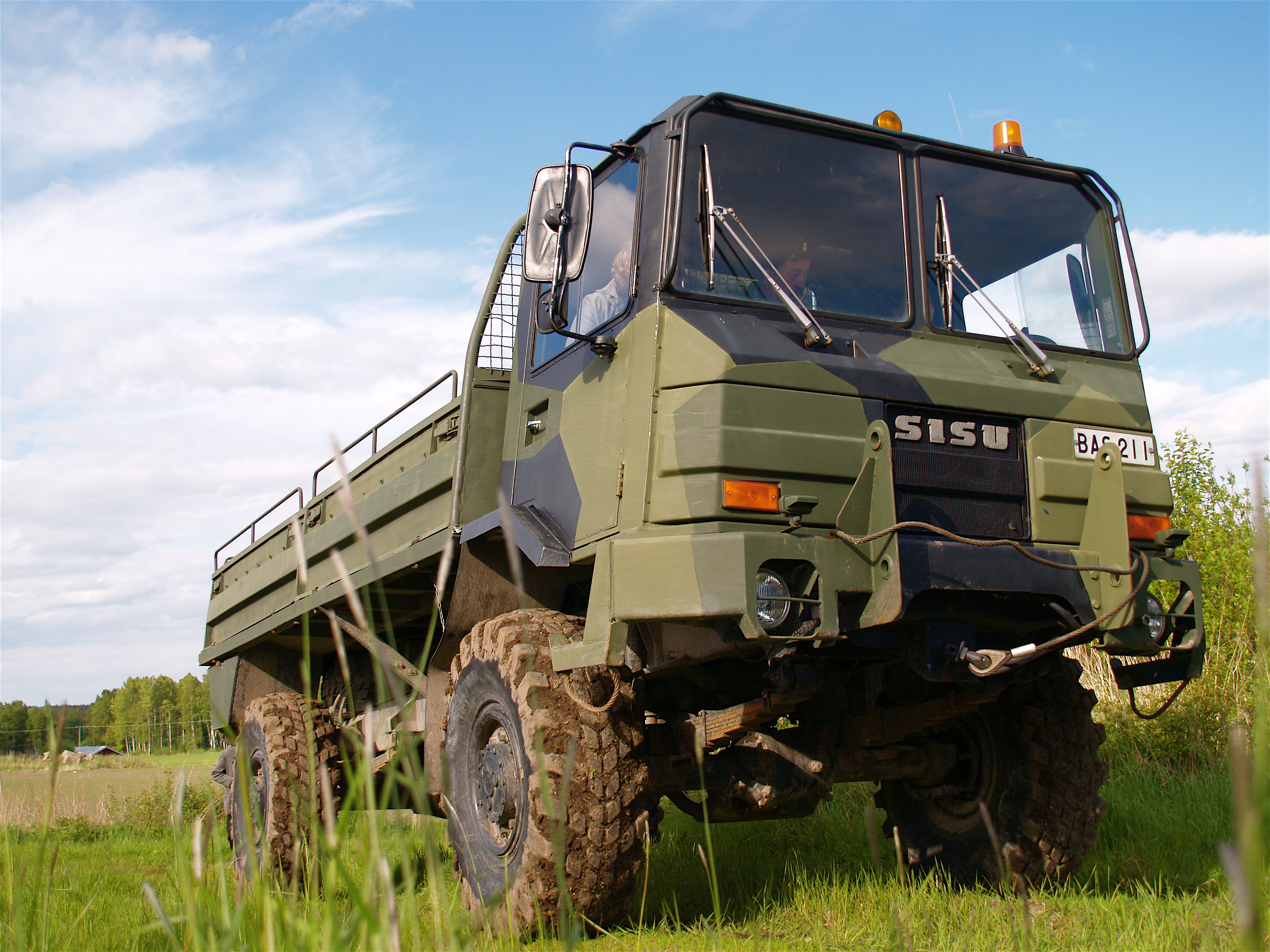

Overview
- Manufacturer: Oy Sisu-Auto Ab
- Also called: Maasto-Sisu, "Masi"
- Production: 1982–1991
- Assembly: Hämeenlinna and Karis, Finland
- Designer: Seppo Kokkola, Kari Lindholm, Veli Vallinoja, Uoti Hartikainen, Kalevi Kakko

Body and chassis
- Class: medium size off-road lorry
- Body style: platform lorry
- Related: Sisu SA-240

Powertrain
- Engine: 6-cyl. Valmet 611 CSBA
- Transmission: 6-speed manual (ZF) and a 2-stage reduction gear

Dimensions
- Wheelbase: 3,850 mm
- Length: 6,760 mm
- Width: 2,480 mm
- Height: 3,100 mm
- Kerb weight: 7,600 kg

Chronology
- Predecessor: Sisu A-45
- Successor: Sisu SA-130

Sisu SA-150 is a medium-size, two-axle off-road lorry made by the Finnish heavy vehicle manufacturer Oy Sisu-Auto Ab from 1982 until 1991. The four-wheel-drive lorry with load capacity of 6,400 kg was developed for pulling of heavy cannons of the Finnish Defence Forces.

== Development ==
Based on experience from Sisu A-45 and due to new, heavier cannons, there came a need for stronger vehicles in the Finnish Defence Forces. Due to this, Sisu-Auto started a development project of an entirely new medium size off-road lorry.

The engineering work began in 1978 in the main office of Sisu-Auto located then in Fleming Street, Helsinki. The project manager was Seppo Kokkola, the head engineer of the company. The other members were Kari Lindholm, Veli Vallinoja, Uoti Hartikainen and Kalevi Kakko who were the most notable engineers of Sisu-Auto. The starting point was NATO compatibility, which can be seen for instance on the tyre size of 14.00-20 and the general looks of the vehicle. Building of the first prototype was started in November 1979 and the first test run was performed in the following February. In April the prototype was taken to Rovajärvi for field testing and in the following autumn began a half-year testing programme. The vehicle passed the tests of the Defence Forces.

The prototype was called SA-140. It was powered by a turbocharged Valmet 611 of which output was 140 kW. The top speed was 100 km/h and with the biggest gear ratio the top speed was 1.6 km/h. The vehicle was clearly larger and more powerful than A-45. Its kerb weight was nearly the same as the gross weight of A-45.

At its early development A-45 had been nicknamed "Proto-Sisu", referring to prototype, by the Finnish army officers. Obviously, Sisu-Auto did not like this name and named the vehicle Masi, which comes from Maasto-Sisu, "Terrain Sisu". Masi is also the Finnish name for Beetle Bailey.

== Production ==
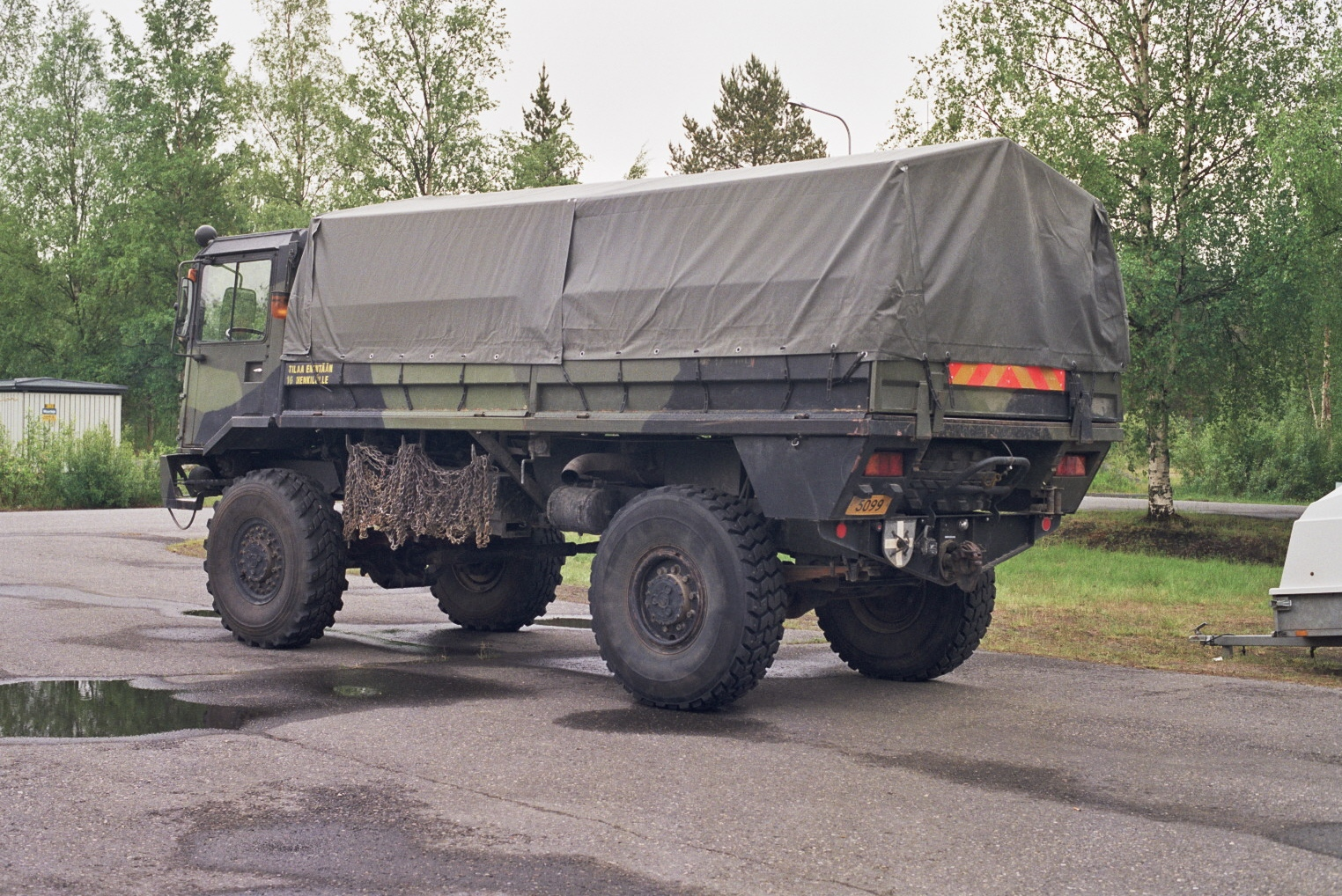
Rear view on SA-150.

The production model got a more powerful, 150 kW engine, and was therefore named SA-150. Serial production started in Sisu-Auto Hämeenlinna factory in 1982 and the first delivery lot of 10 vehicles was handed over to the Defence Forces in October the same year. Beginning from the following year the annual production was about 60 vehicles. Almost all vehicles were built in Hämeenlinna, only two small delivery lots at an early stage of the vehicles production cycle were made in Sisu's Karis factory.

== Technical data ==
In the production of SA-150 Sisu-Auto utilised many shared components of other Sisu models, in particular early XA-180 Pasi's.

=== Engine ===
The engine is water-cooled, turbocharged six-cylinder in-line Valmet 611 CSBA direct injection diesel of which output is 150 kW and maximum torque 680 Nm.

=== Transmission and chassis ===
Behind the engine there is a dry single-plate clutch and six-speed gearbox that was made by ZF. The vehicle is equipped with a two-step reduction gear that doubles the number of gears. Both axles are rigid and driven and equipped with air S cam drum brakes.

Suspension is carried out by leaf springs and the front axle has hydraulic dampers. The axle load is nearly even and the frame allows torsional bending which helps the wheels keeping their contact on ground also on rough terrain. The steering system is aided by servo.

=== Cabin and accessories ===
The cabin is forward-control type and contains seats for driver and two passengers. Both the cabin and platform are attached on the frame by elastic pads which allow the torsional movement of the frame without twisting the superstructures. The driver's seat can be adjusted for length and height. The heating fan has got two speeds. On the top of the cabin there is a hatch and a frame for camouflage.

The platform is designed to carry up to 26 troops. The sides are openable and the platform can be covered by tarpaulin supported by steel frame.

The electric system is 24-volt type and includes two batteries, each of 150 Ah.

The vehicle is fitted with capacity of 8,000 kg winch with 50-metre cable that can be used both in front and back.

Fuel tank capacity is 225 litres.

== Characteristics ==
The vehicle top speed is 100 km/h and its range is 800 km. The off-road capability is good mainly due to the torsionally bending frame. The angle of approach is 42° and the angle of departure is 39°. The ground clearance is 0.4 m and turning circle 8.2 m.

== Variations ==
The SA-150 was followed by further developed SA-151 which was produced in 1990–1991. The major difference was the platform that was widened by 100 mm.

== Usage ==
The main purpose of SA-150 is towing of cannons and carrying of ammunition. Its bigger brother is three-axle SA-240.
