= Sisu A2045 =

Finnish standard medium tactical truck

SISU A2045
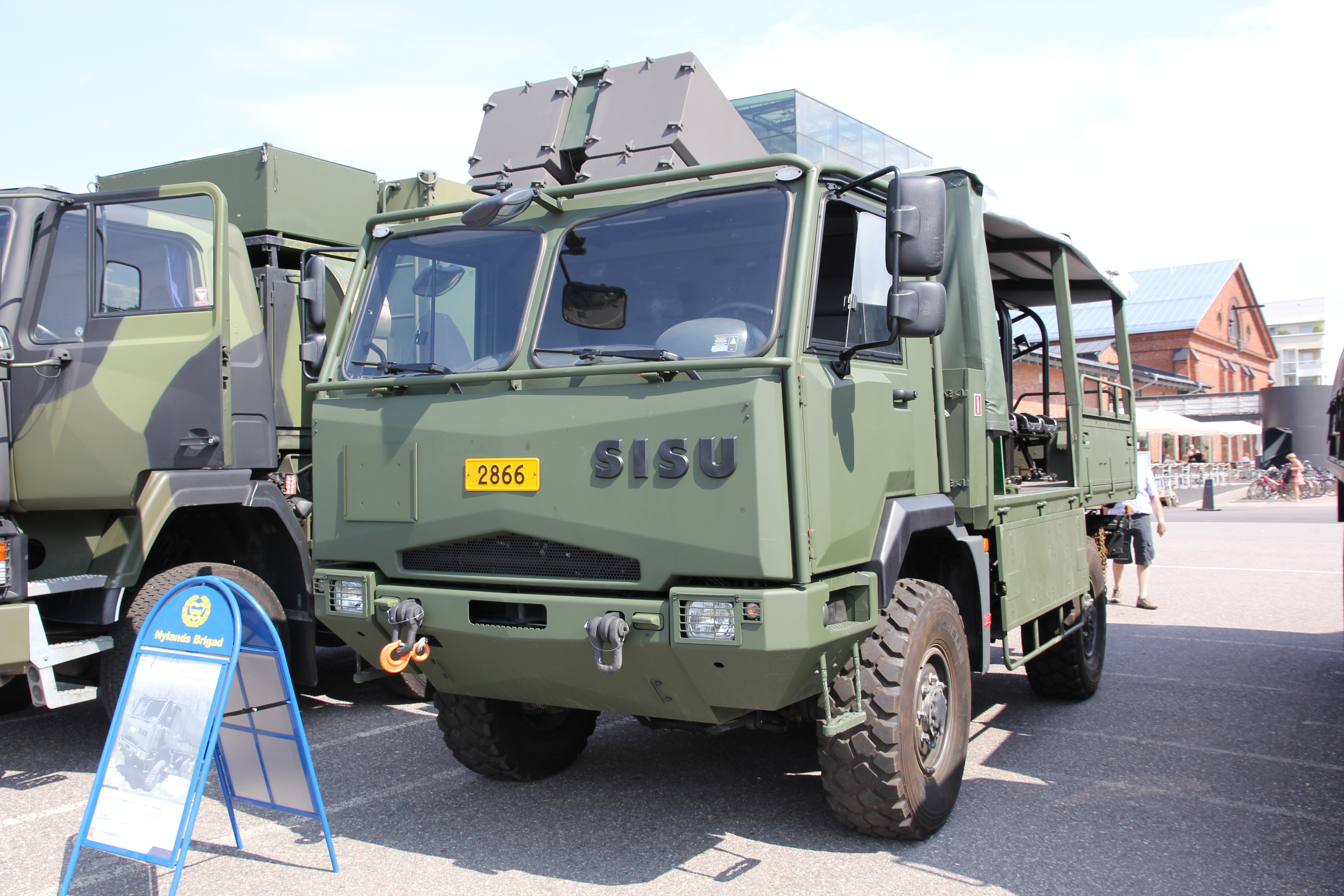
- Sisu A2045
- Place of origin: Finland

Service history
- Used by: Finland

Production history
- Manufacturer: Sisu Auto, Karis of Raseborg
- No. built: 234 (FDF orders 2009-2010)

Specifications
- Mass: 7.4 t (16,000 lb) (empty); 13.4 t (30,000 lb) (full weight)
- Length: 6.45 m (21 ft 2 in)
- length: 3.25 m (10 ft 8 in) (wheelbase)
- Width: 2.44 m (8 ft 0 in)
- Height: 3.05 m (10 ft 0 in)
- Crew: 1+2, option for extra 12 persons outside the driver's cabin
- Armor: STANAG 4569; Ballistic level 1
- Engine: 6.87 L 6-cyl MAN D0836 LFL63 Euro 5 Turbo Diesel; 184 kW (250 hp), 1,000 Nm
- Payload capacity: 6 t (13,000 lb)
- Transmission: 9-port manual ZF 9S 1310OD or 12-port automatic ZF 12 AS 1210 OD MAN TipMatic
- Suspension: 4×4 wheeled, axles: MAN VP06 front, HPO 728 rear
- Ground clearance: .35m
- Fuel capacity: 300 L (79 US gal; 66 imp gal)
- Operational range: 500 km (310 mi)
- Maximum speed: 105 km/h (65 mph)

The Sisu A2045 HMTV (High Mobility Terrain Vehicle) is a Finnish standard medium tactical truck, intended to replace older SISU A45 "Proto" light trucks in the Finnish Defence Forces. In spoken language Sisu A2045 is called the MAN-Sisu referring to the engine, axles and other elementary parts delivered by the German lorry manufacturer MAN Nutzfahrzeuge, officially MAN SE, former MAN AG. For the personal transportation on the installed seats, twelve persons can travel outside the driver's cabin. The lorry is classified by its weight as a middle off-road logistic vehicle.

The trucks are used for general logistics and conscript training, as well as for towing artillery pieces, anti-aircraft weapons and command modules.

Sisu A2045 is the successor of Sisu A-45, Sisu AH-45 and Sisu KB-45. The A2045 was introduced at the Security and Defence 2008 exhibition in Lahti, Finland.

== Operators ==
- Finland: The Finnish Defence Forces has ordered 232 4×4 vehicles for delivery 2009–2010. It has also an option for an additional 240 vehicles to be bought after 2010.
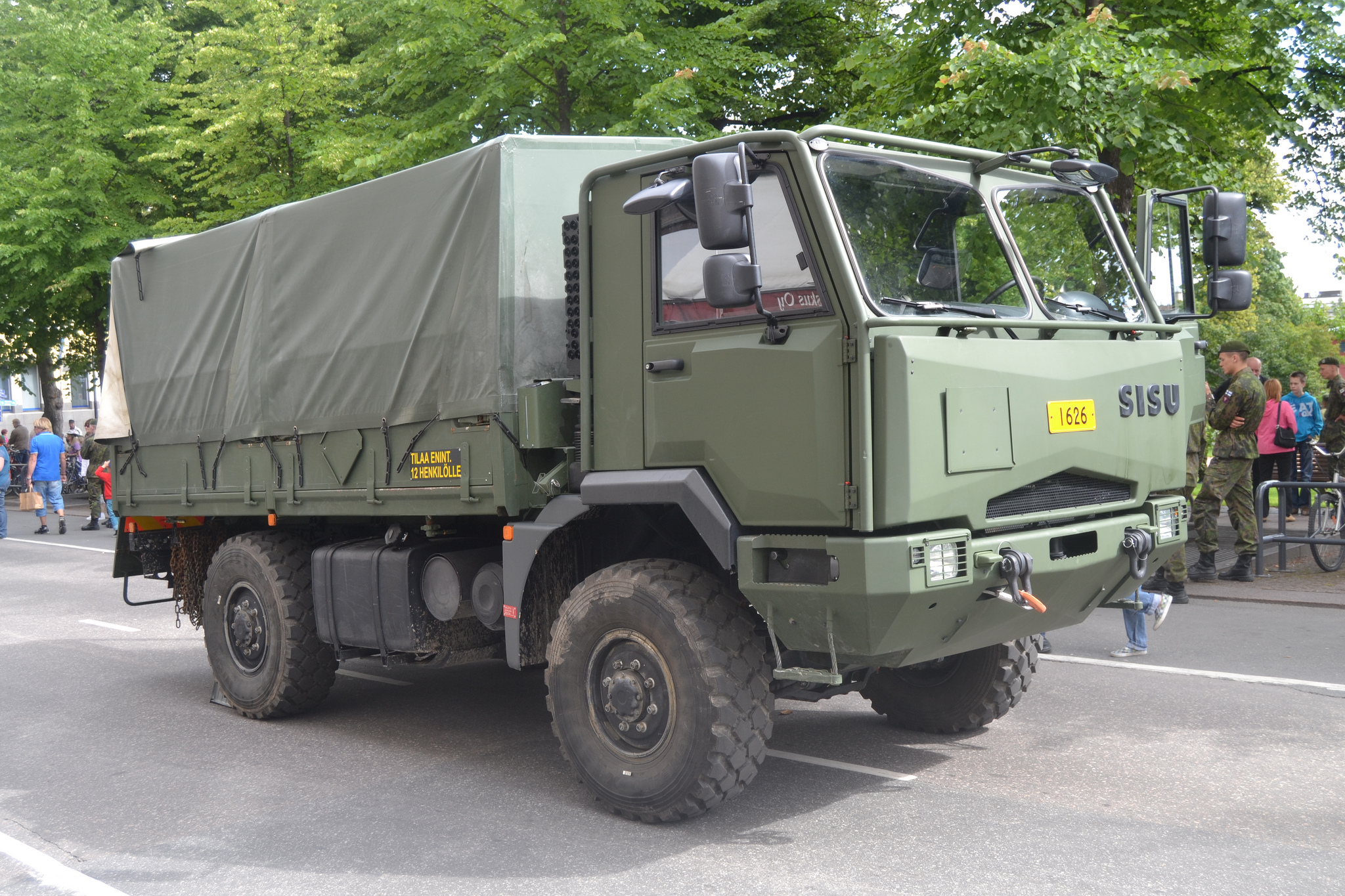
Side view

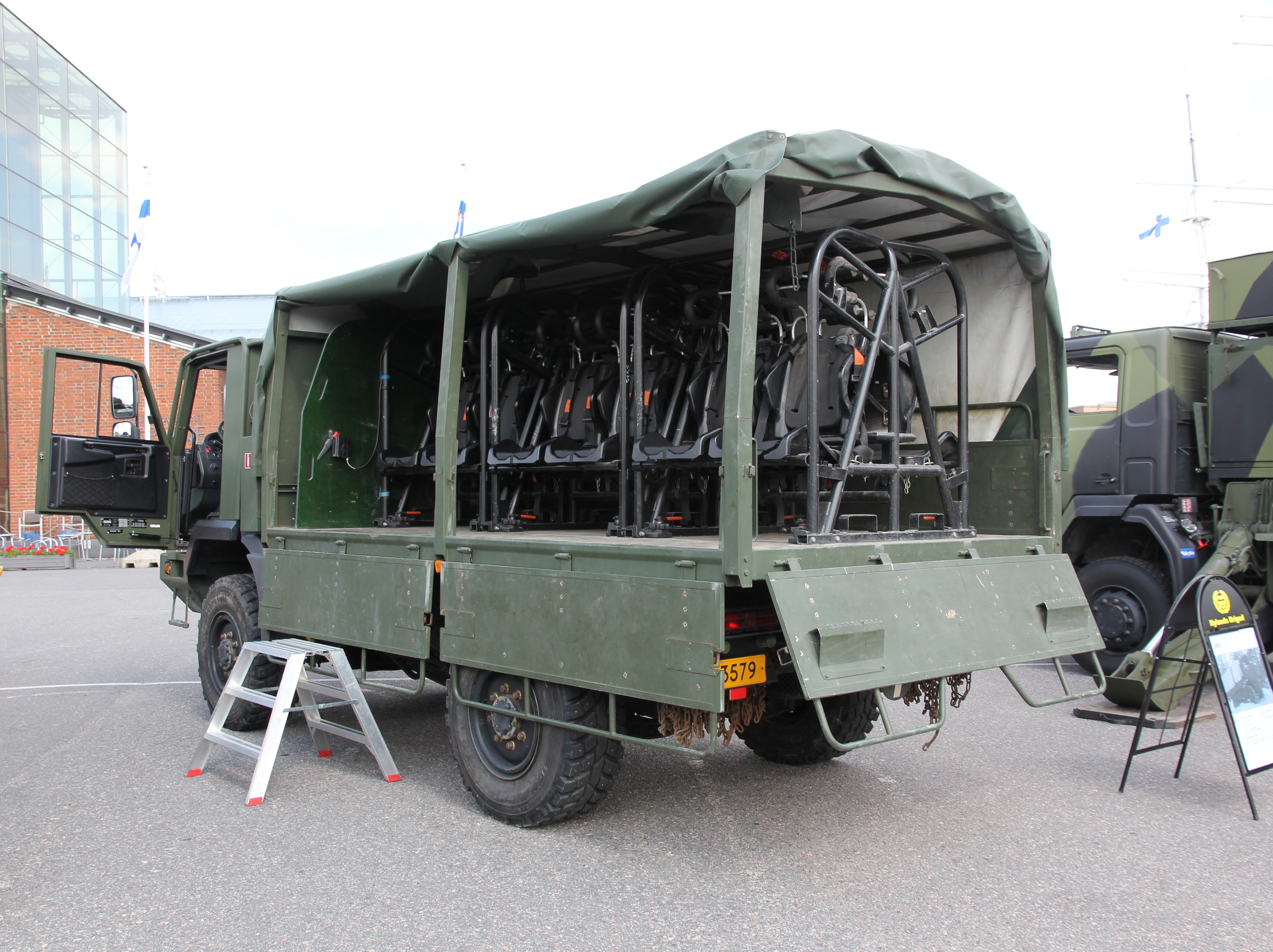
Troop compartment

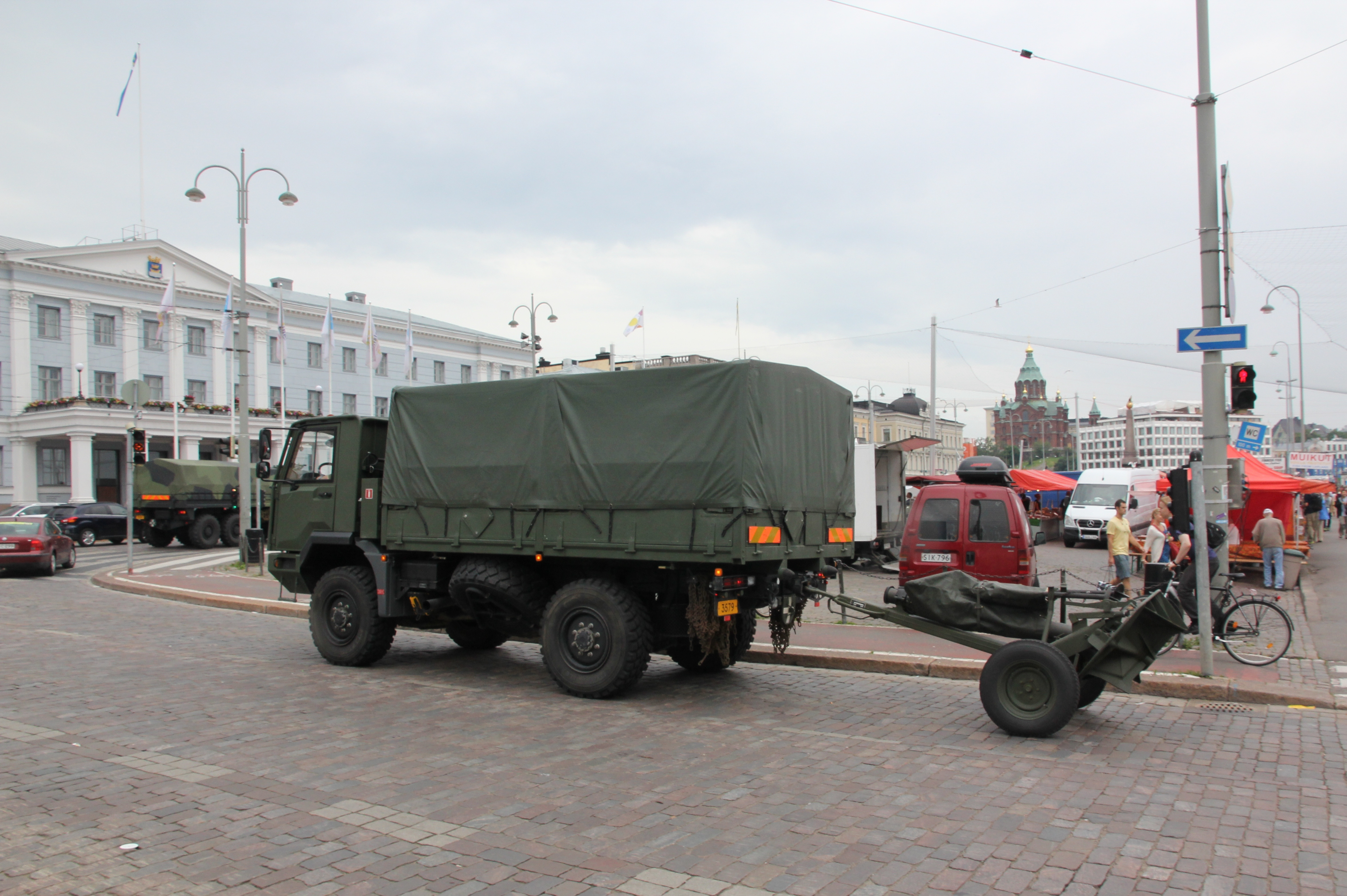
Towing mortar
