= Sisu M-161 =

Truck made by Finnish manufacturer Suomen Autoteollisuus

Sisu M-161, M-162, M-163 and M-168
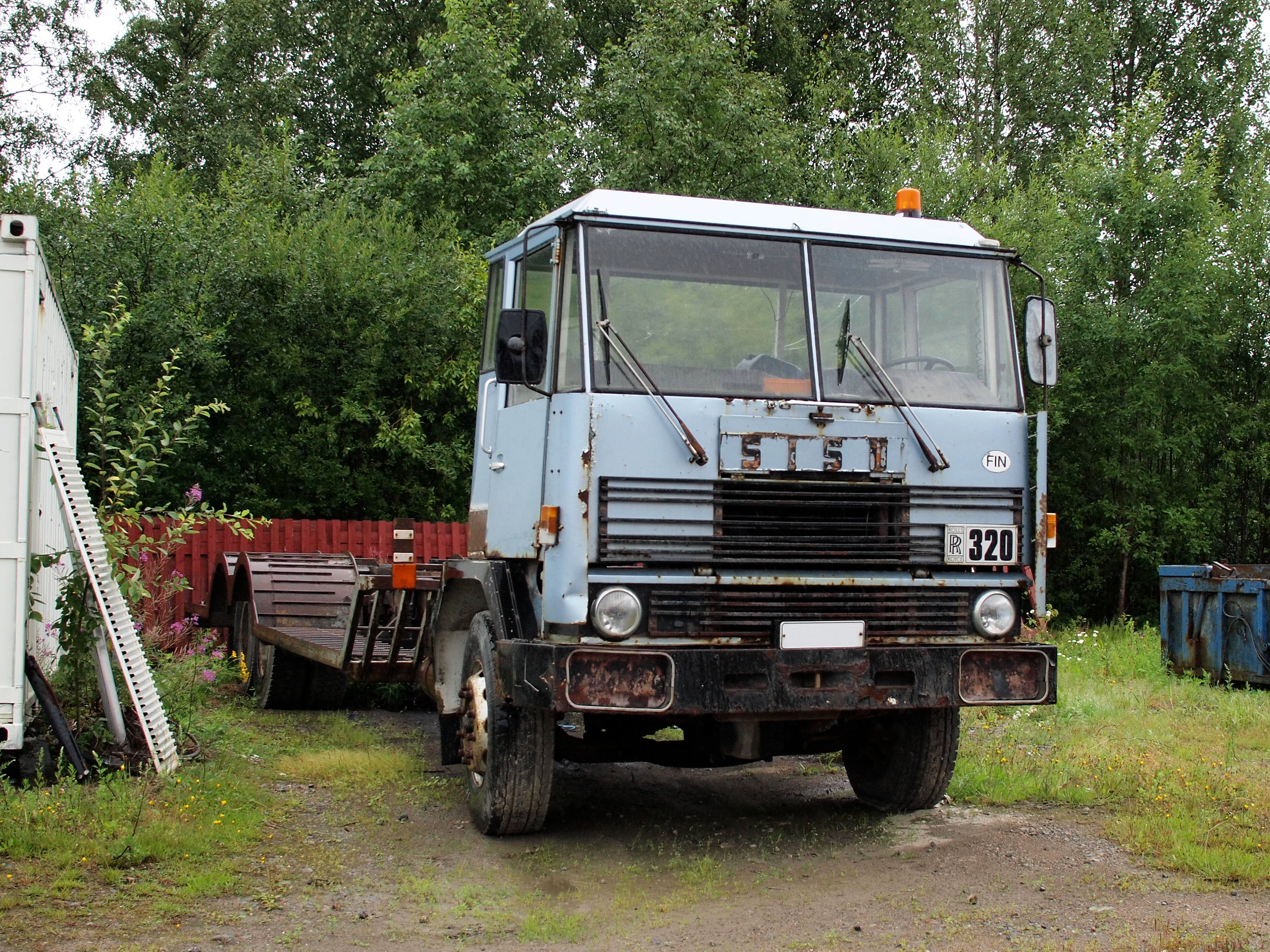
- Sisu M-162CZT 6×2

Overview
- Manufacturer: Oy Suomen Autoteollisuus Ab (from 1981 Oy Sisu-Auto Ab)
- Also called: Jyry-Sisu
- Production: 1969–1984
- Assembly: Karis and Hämeenlinna, Finland

Body and chassis
- Layout: M-161: 4×2; M-162: 6×2; M-163: 6×4; M-168: 8×2
- Related: Sisu KB-46

Powertrain
- Engine: Leyland, Rolls-Royce and Cummins diesels; 265–405 hp ^{→ table}
- Transmission: Fuller RTO-958LL-B (BVF-14) 14+3 or RTO-9513 (BVF-13) 13+2

Dimensions
- Wheelbase: → table
- Width: 2,500 mm
- Height: 2,890 mm
- Kerb weight: from 6,610 kg ^{→ table}

Chronology
- Predecessor: Sisu KB-112 and KB-117
- Successor: Sisu SM-series

Sisu M-series is a 2–4-axle forward control lorry model series made by the Finnish heavy vehicle producer Suomen Autoteollisuus (SAT) in 1969–1984. The series consists of 4×2-driven M-161, 6×2-driven M-162, 6×4-driven M-163 and 8×2-driven M-168. Typical applications were logging trucks, tankers and long-distance transportation haulers which pulled conventional and semi-trailers. The permissible payloads varied from ca. 9 tonnes up over 18 tonnes.

The predecessors of the series were Sisu KB-112 and KB-117. M-type was later replaced by Sisu SM-series.

== Development ==
The preceding models of M-series were three-axle KB-112 and two-axle KB-117 which featured a serial produced hydraulically tiltable cabin first in Europe. In 1968 SAT took over its main domestic competitor Vanajan Autotehdas (VAT) from which it got new technical solutions and the company's new head designer Veikko Muronen.

The development of the new concept had begun, however, before the takeover of VAT. A 1968 built military application, artillery hauler prototype KB-46 was equipped with an entirely new, rectangular shaped cabin which was used also on the initial prototype MS-162BPT. The heavy-duty Jyry-class hauler was designated in particular for long-distance transportation.

== Production and market ==
The first units were handed over to customers already at the end of 1969 but officially the new model was launched in 1970 together with the new R-type, which featured a conventional type cabin.

The applications included haulers for conventional and semi-trailers, tankers and logging vehicles. A number of other applications were produced in small numbers for both civil market and the Finnish Defence Forces. The vehicles are known to be exported at least to Switzerland, Algeria and Greece.

Already since the 1950s SAT had negotiated with the authorities for allowing four-axle lorries with two steering axles in road transportation. Such layout had already been used in mobile cranes since the late 1960s. At the end of 1978 the Ministry of Transport finally allowed also such lorries. The first homologated four-axle lorry in Finland was Sisu M-168 of which second steering axle was the same as used in Sisu T-108 mobile crane.

All M-series lorries were produced in the Karis factory apart from a 30 units' series of four-axle M-168CEV and M-168BEV lorries which were assembled in Hämeenlinna factory due to lack of capacity in Karis.

The last M-series units were produced in 1984 and the range was replaced by modular SM-series.

== Technical data ==
=== Engine ===
M-series used initially Leyland and Rolls-Royce diesels. Later Cummins came into the selection.

During the years Leyland had produced for Sisu sturdy, reliable and nearly indestructible engines – as well as technically utterly failed units. The V8-diesel O.801 was first tested in the KB-46 before it was used in M-series; unfortunately, this engine belongs to the latter category and therefore it stayed in the selection only for a short period.

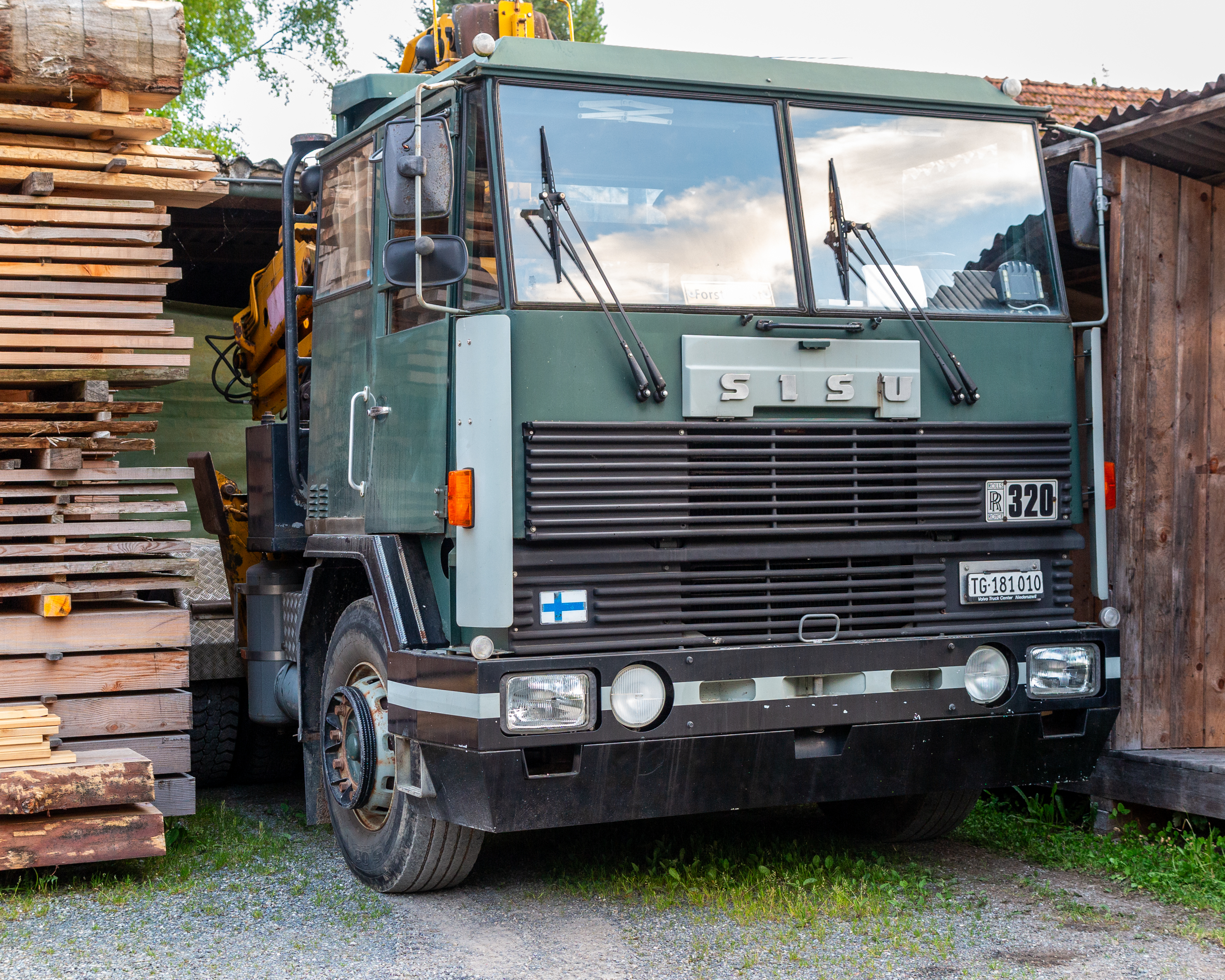
SISU M with Rolls-Royce engine in Switzerland in 2017

The first Sisu's with Rolls-Royce engines were produced in the 1950s. The first Rolls-Royce used in the M-series was a 282-hp version of the Eagle 275. In 1973 an optional 297-hp Eagle 305 became available. The 315-hp Eagle 320 Mk III presented in 1976 became a famous engine in Sisus; later that year power was increased to 327 hp. The following year a downgraded 271-hp Eagle 265 Mk III became available. The lorries powered by these units can be recognised by the "RR 320" or "RR 265" badges on the grille. The very last Rolls-Royce engine installed in a Sisu is the Eagle 340 Mk III which was used in the MA-162CZV concept vehicle.

The weakness of Eagle Mk III engines was excessive wear of cylinder liners. The problem was fixed with silicon carbide treated liners which were taken into use in 1980, after which the engine type became called Rolls-Royce Eagle Mk III "Finlandia." The more durable liners were later also installed in the older engine types. Users were also demanding more power than Rolls-Royce could provide.

The first experiences from Cummins engines in Sisu's in the late 1960s had not been good. The engines used were Cummins Vale V8 diesels which suffered frequent failures. But the experiences were different when the six-cylinder 375 PS (276 kW; 370 hp) Cummins NTE-370 engines became available in the M-series in 1979. The engines were produced in Cummins factory in Shotts, Scotland. After some minor initial problems with fuel system were resolved, the engine soon gained the full trust of its users – it has been even said that this engine type saved Sisu. Later the selection was extended with the 290-hp NTE-290 and the more powerful yet 405-hp NTE-400. This was a breakthrough for Cummins in Sisus; the Leyland and Rolls-Royce options were then incrementally withdrawn.

==== Engine data ====
Model name extension	BPT	BY	BST	CST	CZT	DST	CZV	CEV	DET	BEV
Make and model	Leyland; O.690 turbo	Leyland; O.801 V8	RR Eagle; 265 Mk I	RR Eagle; 305 Mk II	RR Eagle; 320 Mk III	RR Eagle; 265 Mk III	RR Eagle; 340 Mk III	Cummins; NTE 370	Cummins; NTE 290	Cummins; NTE 400
Presented	1969	1970	1970	1973	1976	1977	1978	1979	1980	1981
Max. output	197.7 kW (269 PS; 265 hp)	220.1 kW (299 PS; 295 hp)	208.9 kW (284 PS; 280 hp)	246.2 kW (335 PS; 330 hp)	235.0 kW (320 PS; 315 hp)	202.0 kW (275 PS; 271 hp)	253.6 kW (345 PS; 340 hp)	276 kW; 375 PS; 370 hp	216.3 kW (294 PS; 290 hp)	302.1 kW (411 PS; 405 hp)

=== Transmission and chassis ===
The engine power is transferred via dry two-plate clutch to Fuller gearbox, which was available with 13 forward and two reverse gears, or 14 forward and 3 reverse gears. The gearbox features a PTO shaft located underneath.

The initially used driven rear axle features differential with integrated reduction gear; the ratios are 4.72:1 and 7.06:1 for the applications with Rolls-Royce and six-cylinder Leyland O.690, for the Leyland O.801 V8 engine the ratios are 5.25:1 and 7.85:1. The axle is equipped with differential interlock. For an option became a double reduction model BTO in 1972 (Kirkstall D85-13) . A new feature was also the outstanding full load lifting tandem axle mechanism which was inherited from Vanaja; the system could lift the rearmost axle when the load on tandem was 20 tonnes. This enabled a good grip on slippery surface.

The front axle turning angle is 50°, and due to this, the turning radius is relatively small.

The brakes are air operated S-cam brakes with two circuits. The braking system is equipped with front axle braking power reducing system.

The Z-profile frame is particularly rigid and therefore good vehicle behaviour also in terrain. The transversal beams are tube profile and joined to the longitudinal ones by means of bolts.

The transmission characteristics as well as the rigid frame were valued especially in logging use. The terrain capability could be further enhanced with Sisu Nemo hydraulic trailer drive which was available as option; a fully laden 6×2-driven M-162 could pull a full two-axle trailer with a hydraulically driven fore axle up on a 26% slope.

=== Cabin ===
The rectangular shaped, riveted forward control cabin was produced by SAT. The producer advertised that the cabin, that contains seats for driver and two passengers, is particularly rigid and fulfilled all the contemporary safety requirements. Special attention was paid on engine noise isolation. Two heaters take care of heating and two fans as well as sunroof are for ventilation; the cabin contains eight nozzles for incoming air. SAT advertised that it had brought the flow-through ventilation first into market.

The whole cabin can be tilted forward for service work; it is hinged from front end with two rubber-damped hinges. Also the rear end of the cabin is damped with rubber and in addition there is a separate shock absorber between the frame and cabin. The cabin can be tilted in 15 seconds but daily inspections can be done without tilting.

The dashboard instrumentation includes speedometer with odometer, revolution counter and gauges showing oil pressure, fuel, cooling water temperature, air pressure of both circuits and ammeter. There are lamps for oil pressure, indicators, alternator charging, differential interlock engagement, air pressure system warning, parking brake engagement and engine overheating indicator, and switches for headlights, heater and ventilation, windscreen wipers, indicators, differential interlock, hand throttle and engine shutdown; the models with tandem axle are also equipped with tandem lifting and lowering switches.

Two types of cabins were available: a normal day cabin and sleeping cabin which is 200 mm longer. The sleeping cabin is equipped with bunk bed of which upper bunk can be lifted close to ceiling for better visibility. The bunks and rear windows are with curtains.

The M-series got several nicknames due to the appearance and characteristics of the cabin; it is commonly known as "rivet-box-Sisu", "showcase-Sisu" and "wiener-booth-Sisu". An advantage in the cabin is a good visibility due to the large windows.

The cabins of M-series were used on Sisu-Lokomo mobile cranes and they were also sold to Irish Dennison Truck Mfg. Ltd. which used them in its heaviest lorries. The cabins were delivered from Karis ready outfitted with right-hand-drive system.

=== Other equipment ===
A 250-litre fuel tank is fitted as standard, but additional tanks sizes of 170 and 250 litres were available. The tank is equipped with a filter that separates water from fuel.

Two 145 Ah batteries are fitted into heatable boxes. The voltage of the electrical system is 24 V.

=== Dimensions and weights ===
The contemporary Finnish legislation allowed a total weight of 16 tonnes for the two-axle M-161. The three-axle M-162 and M-163 were allowed to load up to 22 tonnes and the four-axle M-168 total 28 tonnes. The kerb weights of the vehicles varied according to the engine, cabin and superstructures, and therefore, the payloads varied as well.

The below table lists maximum permissible weights and dimensions of some of the variants. The list is incomplete. The figures which concern the applications with sleeping cabin, whenever they differ from the day cabin values, are shown in Italic.

Model	Layout	Wheelbase	Kerb weight	Permitted load	Max. gross weight	Max. length of platform
M-161BPT	4×2	3,600 mm	6,140 – 6,290 kg	9,710 – 9,860 kg	16,000 kg	5,090 – 5,490 mm
M-161BPT	4×2	5,200 mm	6,490 – 6,640 kg	9,360 – 9,510 kg	16,000 kg	7,730 – 8,130 mm
M-161CST	4×2	3,600 mm	6,460 – 6,610 kg	9,390 – 9,540 kg	16,000 kg	5,090 – 5,340 mm
M-161CST	4×2	5,200 mm	6,666 – 6,810 kg	9,190 – 9,340 kg	16,000 kg	7,730 – 7,980 mm
M-161DST	4×2	3,600 mm	6,460 – 6,610 kg	9,090 – 9,440 kg	15,700 – 15,900 kg	5,090 – 5,340 mm
M-161DST	4×2	4,600 mm	6,600 – 6,750 kg	9,250 – 9,400 kg	16,000 kg	6,740 – 6,990 mm
M-161DST	4×2	5,200 mm	6,660 – 6,810 kg	9,190 – 9,340 kg	16,000 kg	7,730 – 7,980 mm
M-162BPT	6×2	3,000 + 1,200 mm	7,540 – 7,690 kg	14,300 – 14,500 kg	22,000 kg	5,090 – 5,490 mm
M-162BPT	6×2	3,400 + 1,200 mm	7,610 – 7,760 kg	14,200 – 14,400 kg	22,000 kg	5,750 – 6,150 mm
M-162BPT	6×2	3,800 + 1,200 mm	7,720 – 7,870 kg	14,100 – 14,300 kg	22,000 kg	6,410 – 6,810 mm
M-162BPT	6×2	4,200 + 1,200 mm	7,790 – 7,940 kg	14,100 – 14,200 kg	22,000 kg	7,070 – 7,470 mm
M-162BPT	6×2	4,600 + 1,200 mm	7,820 – 7,970 kg	14,000 – 14,100 kg	22,000 kg	7,730 – 8,130 mm
M-162CEV	6×2	3,400 + 1,200 mm	8,090 – 8,210 kg	13,730 – 13,910 kg	21,950 – 22,000 kg	5,900 – 6,100 mm
M-162CEV	6×2	3,800 + 1,200 mm	8,120 – 8,140 kg	13,760 – 13,880 kg	22,000 kg	6,200 – 6,500 mm
M-162CEV	6×2	4,200 + 1,200 mm	8,220 – 8,340 kg	13,660 – 13,780 kg	22,000 kg	7,260 – 7,460 mm
M-162CEV	6×2	4,600 + 1,200 mm	8,270 – 8,390 kg	13,610 – 13,730 kg	22,000 kg	7,940 – 8,140 mm
M-162CST	6×2	3,150 + 1,200 mm	7,940 – 8,090 kg	13,900 – 14,100 kg	22,000 kg	5,330 – 5,580 mm
M-162CST	6×2	3,400 + 1,200 mm	7,610 – 8,110 kg	13,900 – 14,000 kg	22,000 kg	5,750 – 6,000 mm
M-162CST	6×2	3,800 + 1,200 mm	7,990 – 8,140 kg	13,900 – 14,000 kg	22,000 kg	6,410 – 6,660 mm
M-162CST	6×2	4,200 + 1,200 mm	8,090 – 8,240 kg	13,700 – 13,900 kg	22,000 kg	7,070 – 7,320 mm
M-162CST	6×2	4,600 + 1,200 mm	8,110 – 8,260 kg	13,700 – 13,900 kg	22,000 kg	7,730 – 7,980 mm
M-163CST	6×4	3,000 + 1,370 mm	8,800 – 8,950 kg	13,100 – 13,200 kg	22,000 kg	5,230 – 5,480 mm
M-168CEV	8×2	1,800 + 4,500 + 1,200 mm	9,340 kg	18,660 kg	28,000 kg	

== Sisu MA-162 ==
In 1978 SAT made a study for increasing of payload on logging trucks by reducing the kerb weight. The vehicle was based on Sisu M-162 and it was connected to a two-axle conventional trailer. Transversal frame beams and some other chassis parts, rims, subframe, wings, crane beam, protection wall behind the cabin and the vertical side beams to hold the logs were made from aluminium alloy instead of steel; this led to weight saving of 1,435 kg. The trailer was lightened with similar methods, leading to 950 kg lighter kerb weight. In addition, the truck was equipped with RR Eagle 340 engine that is slightly lighter than the standard Eagle 320. The model name of the prototype was MA-162CZV. The truck was nicknamed "Emma" and it was developed together with the end customer, company Tehdaspuu Oy.

Another similar study followed in 1980 when SAT built a container truck by using aluminium structures. The prototype model name was MA-162CZV, this time with Cummins engine.

== Sources ==
- Mäkipirtti, Markku (2011). Sisu. Ajoneuvot Suomessa (in Finnish). Vol. 4 (2. ed.). Tampere: Apali Oy. ISBN 978-952-5877-05-2.
- Blomberg, Olli (2006). Suomalaista Sisua vuodesta 1931 – Monialaosaajasta kuorma-autotehtaaksi [Finnish Sisu since 1931 – From multi-industrial expert to lorry factory] (in Finnish). Karis: Oy Sisu Auto Ab. ISBN 952-91-4918-2.
