= Sisu KB-45 =

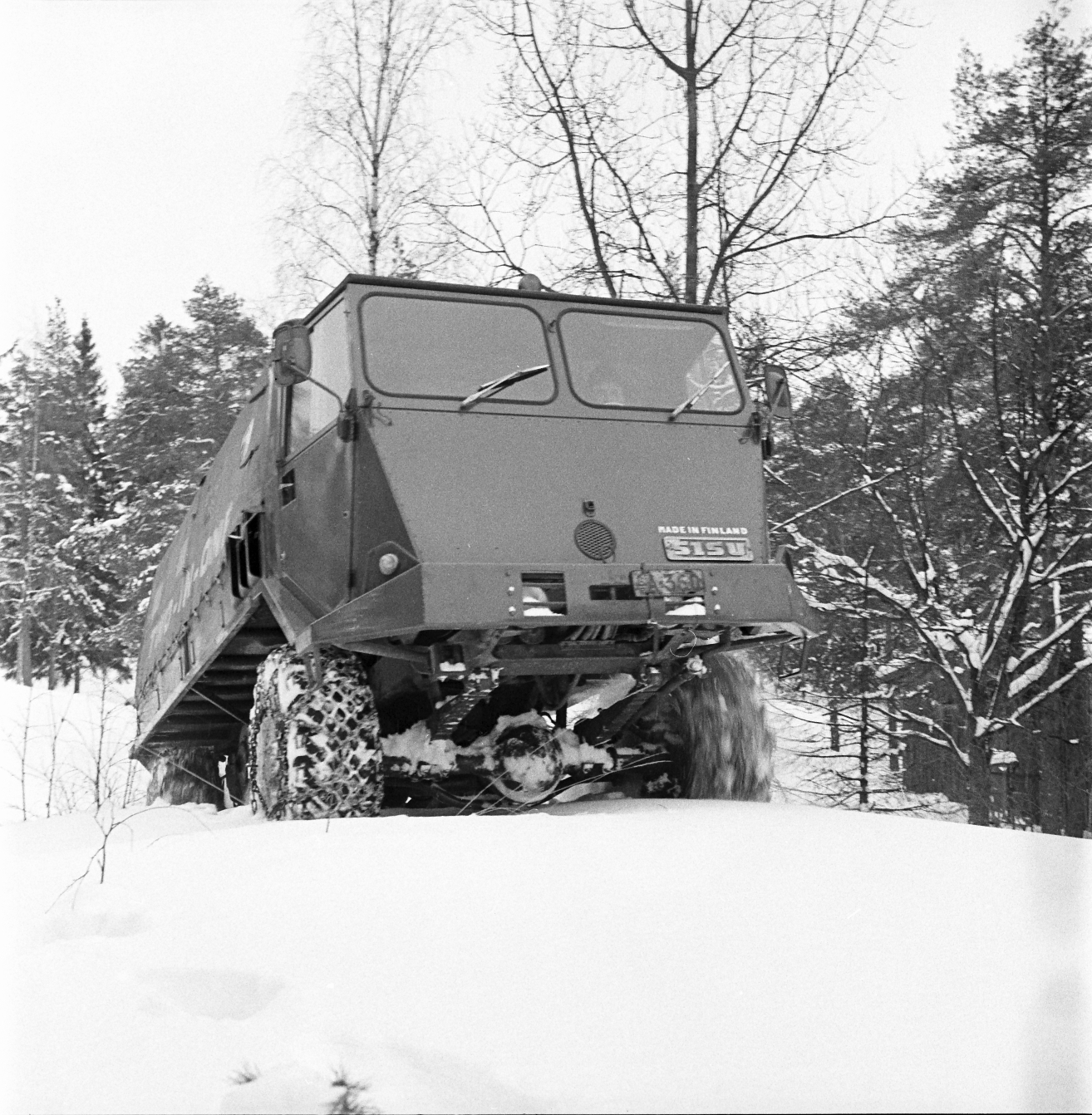

Overview
- Manufacturer: Oy Suomen Autoteollisuus Ab
- Also called: "Proto-Sisu"
- Production: 1965–1970
- Assembly: Karis, Finland
- Designer: Uoti Hartikainen, Pentti E. Lehtinen, Armas Tuominen and Nils Fagerstedt

Body and chassis
- Class: light off-road lorry
- Body style: platform lorry

Powertrain
- Engine: Leyland in-line diesel, max. output 135 hp /2400 1/min (SAE)
- Transmission: manual, synchronised 5+1; two-step reduction gear

Dimensions
- Wheelbase: 3,400 mm (133.9 in)
- Length: 5,700 mm (224.4 in)
- Width: 2,350 mm (92.5 in)
- Kerb weight: 4,800 kg (10,582 lb)

Chronology
- Successor: Sisu A-45/AH-45

Sisu KB-45 is a light off-road lorry made by the Finnish heavy vehicle producer Suomen Autoteollisuus (SAT) in 1965–1970. The two-axle, all-wheel-drive vehicle with payload of 4,000 kg was developed after an assignment of the Finnish Defence Forces. It was followed by almost identical A-45/AH-45 in 1970.

== Development ==
KB-45 was developed for the use of light infantry battalions of the Finnish Defence Forces. The project coordinator was Senior Engineer Uoti Hartikainen. The first prototype was built by SAT Testing Department in Fleming Street, Helsinki in March 1964. It was the very last Sisu powered by SAT's own type AMI petrol engine. The axles were made by Kirkstall. The vehicle was nicknamed at an early stage Proto, which was derived from prototyyppi (prototype).

After the first prototype was finished the Defence Forces suddenly changed the specifications; the wheelbase had to be shortened by 30 cm. The decision was based on the Defence Forces' measuring results of average distances between trees in the Finnish forests. The new requirement lead to excessive problems in transmission design; gearbox and reduction gear had to be relocated. A long drive shaft between them had to be substituted by a structurally challenging gear socket system which enabled a shorter distance. Another requirement, replacing the petrol engine by a diesel engine, also caused problems. The original platform fastening system had to be redesigned due to a too small payload. When the final prototype was ready the Defence Forces were satisfied with the result.

== Production and use ==
The first 18 vehicles were handed over to the Defence Forces in August 1965. Their primary use was pulling of howitzers and anti-aircraft cannons. The Defence Forces got in total 83 KB-45's of which two were fire engines. The successor of KB-45, A-45/AH-45, was very similar. The biggest difference was in transmission as the Kirkstall axles were substituted by Sisu's own products. At the same time the production was moved from Karis to Hämeenlinna, the former Vanaja factory which was merged with SAT in beginning of 1969.

The KB-45 models have been substituted in Finnish army by 2008 presented Sisu A2045 lorries.

== Technical data ==
KB-45 is powered by a Leyland in-line diesel engine with a maximum output of 135 hp. The usable revolution area is 1000–2400 1/min. The fuel tank capacity is 226 litres.

The 5-speed transmission is fully synchronised. The vehicle is also equipped with a two-speed reduction gear. Both axles are driven and equipped with lockable differentials. The suspension consists of longitudinally mounted leaf springs and two-way acting telescopic shock absorbers.

The vehicle frame is twisting type enabling of each wheel touching the ground also in rough terrain. The glass fibre and steel made cabin is fastened on the frame from three points and the 4.28-metre long platform, on which is space for 25 people, from four points.

The reconnaissance winch capacity is 6 tonnes and it is equipped with a torque limiter.

Some of the KB-45's were equipped with Sisu Nemo hydraulic system for a hydraulically driven trailer which improved significantly the off-road capability of the combination. The system was marketed with name Two-In-One.

== Characteristics ==
Payload is 2,300 kg in terrain and 4,000 kg on road. The front overhang is 1,300 mm and rear overhang 1,000 mm. The turning radius is 7.6 metres and top speed 90 km/h.

The good off-road capability is carried out by a torsionally bending frame structure and middle located engine which enable an even wheel load even in rough terrain. One of the wheels can be jacked up by one metre the rest three still touching the ground. During the validation tests, the vehicle was driven up 60% steep hills and it could also withstand a 45% side slope without falling.
