= Sisu R-141 =

Finnish truck

Sisu R-141, R-142, R-143, R-144, R-145, R-146, R-148 and R-149
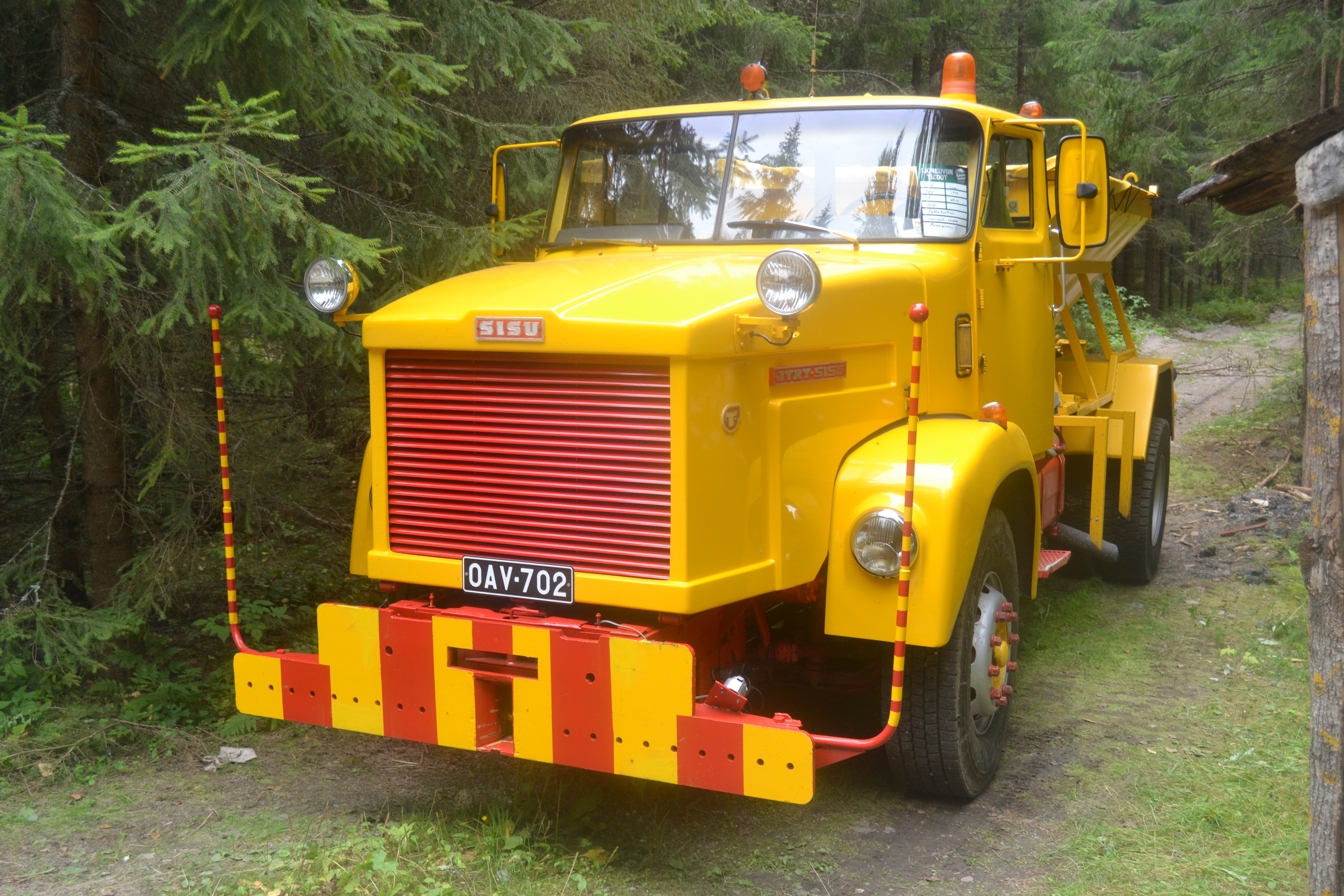
- Sisu R-141BPT 4×2

Overview
- Manufacturer: Oy Suomen Autoteollisuus Ab (from 1981 Oy Sisu-Auto Ab)
- Also called: Jyry-Sisu
- Production: 1970–ca. 1982
- Assembly: Karis, Finland

Body and chassis
- Layout: R-141: 4×2; R-142: 6×2; R-143: 6×4; R-144: 4×4; R-145: 4×4+2; R-146: 6×6; R-148: 4×2; R-149: 6×4

Powertrain
- Engine: Leyland, Rolls-Royce and Cummins diesels; 210–405 hp ^{→ table}

Dimensions
- Wheelbase: → table
- Width: 2,430 mm
- Height: 2,640 mm
- Kerb weight: from 5,810 kg ^{→ table}

Chronology
- Predecessor: Sisu K-141...148
- Successor: Sisu SR

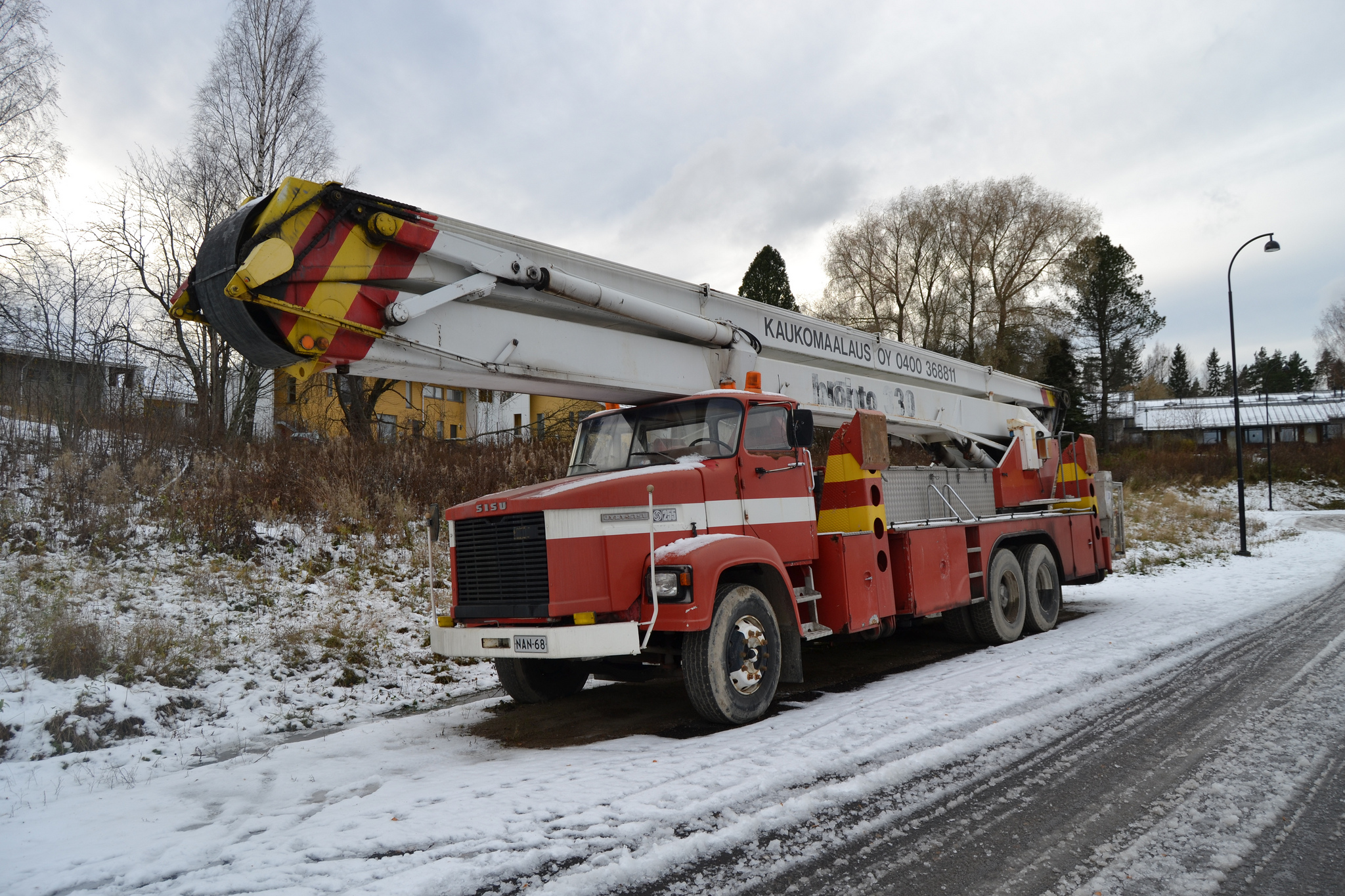
Sisu R-142BPT, a former fire engine with Bronto Skylift aerial platform.

Sisu R-series is a 2–3-axle lorry model series made by the Finnish heavy vehicle producer Suomen Autoteollisuus (SAT) in 1970–1982. The series consists of 4×2-driven R-141 and R-148, 6×2-driven R-142, 6×4-driven R-143 and R-149, 4×4-driven R-144, 4×4+2-driven R-145 and 6×6-driven R-146. Typical applications are logging trucks, dumper trucks and long-distance transportation haulers which pull conventional and semi-trailers.

The predecessors of the series were Sisu K-141...148. R-series was replaced by the 1982 introduced Sisu SR-series.

== Development ==
The R-series belongs to the producer's heavy duty Jyry range and it is based on the preceding models. Similar to the previous range, the R-type is equipped with a tiltable, single piece bonnet made from reinforced plastic as standard. Use of plastic is further increased in various cabin parts.

Previously, Sisu tandems were equipped with an in-house developed mechanism that lifted the rearmost axle. The solution was not very reliable and it had led to a number of warranty claims. The main domestic competitor Vanajan Autotehdas had developed an outstanding lifting tandem mechanism. SAT took over the producer when the designing work of R-series was ongoing, and adopted the mechanism to Sisus. The Vanaja type lifting tandem used in R-142 6×2 variant was the most significant new feature in the R-series.

== Production ==
R-series was officially launched in 1970 together with forward-control M-series. Initially the range consisted of 4×2-driven R-141 and R-148, R-142 with 6×2 layout and R-149 6×4. 4×4+2-driven R-145 was launched in 1971, R-143 6×4 in 1972, R-144 4×4 in 1976 and R-146 in 1978. The R-148 4×2 and R-149 6×4 differ from the similar layout models R-141 4×2 and R-143 6×4 by the engine and cabin location; the first mentioned models are with a short overhang, in the others the power unit is pushed more forward creating a long overhang, in order to optimise load distribution between the axles.

The applications include semi-trailer haulers, earthmovers, logging vehicles, flatbed haulers and tankers. Bronto Skylift used R-142 chassis for its 32-metre high reaching aerial platforms. The 6×4-driven R-143 was targeted to poor terrain conditions and closed construction sites without weight restrictions; the 4×4+2-driven R-145 was in particular for logging use on and off road conditions. The 1978 launched R-146 6×6 was designated to haul heavy flatbed trailers and it was made by combining existing components of the range.

Some units were exported: Colombian transportation company FSM & CIA bought five R-142s to haul semi-trailers with bitumen tanks.

== Technical data ==
=== Engine ===
The initially offered power units were two variants of six-cylinder inline Leyland diesel: the naturally aspirated O.680 and its more powerful turbocharged version O.690. A third option was notorious Leyland O.801 V8, which was used on some R-141 and R-142 models, but remained uncommon and was soon taken out of selection. Rolls-Royce Eagle 265 Mk I as available as the fourth option; the same type had been used already on the preceding models and was further powered on R-series.

14-litre, 6-cylinder Cummins NTE-370-series was introduced in R-models in 1980, two years after it had entered service in M-type. The 1981 introduced R-142BEV features a 405-horsepower variant and it was the most powerful lorry produced in Northern Europe at its time.

==== Engine data ====
Model name extension	BP	BPT	BY	BST	CST	CZT	DST	CEV	DET	BEV
Make and model	Leyland; O.680	Leyland; O.690 turbo	Leyland; O.801 V8	RR Eagle; 265 Mk I	RR Eagle; 305 Mk II	RR Eagle; 320 Mk III	RR Eagle; 265 Mk III	Cummins; NTE 370	Cummins; NTE 290	Cummins; NTE 400
Introduced	1970	1970	1970	1970	1973	1976	1977	1980	1980	1981
Max. output	156.6 kW (213 PS; 210 hp)	197.7 kW (269 PS; 265 hp)	220.1 kW (299 PS; 295 hp)	208.9 kW (284 PS; 280 hp)	246.2 kW (335 PS; 330 hp)	235.0 kW (320 PS; 315 hp)	202.0 kW (275 PS; 271 hp)	279.8 kW (380 PS; 375 hp)	216.3 kW (294 PS; 290 hp)	302.1 kW (411 PS; 405 hp)

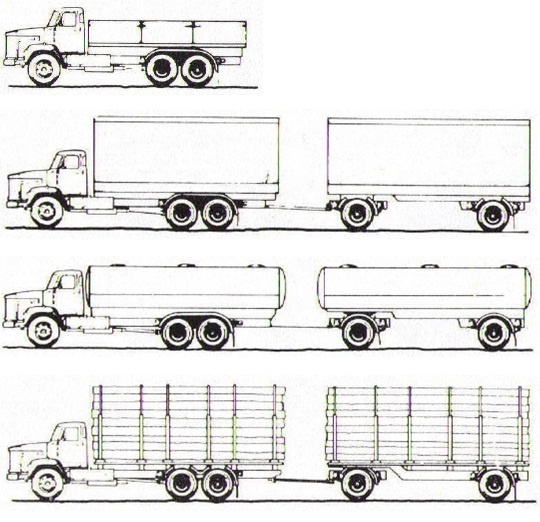
Some of the Sisu R-142 6×2 applications.

=== Transmission and chassis ===
Engine power is transmitted to gearbox through a clutch, which is dry single- or double plate type, or turbine clutch. A number of gearbox options were available. The 13-speed Fuller RTO91513 is suitable for highways, and 14-speed Fuller RTO9508LLB designated for on- and off-road use. Both transmissions provide top speed of 102–107 km/h, but the latter option has got 35% higher ratio with the smallest gear compared to the first variant. Also a six-speed synchronised gearbox was available. PTO is a standard feature in every gearbox option.

The driven rear axle options consisted single and double reduction options. The single reduction models are fitted with integrated two-step reduction gear. Such models are types BTR and BTK. The double reduction models with planetary gears in wheel hubs came into the selection in 1971. Such models are BTO, BTY and BTE. BTY is equipped with three, BTE with five planet gears.

The service brake system is air operated and dual-circuit type.

The frame is U-profile pressed from 8 mm thick steel, with profile height of 250 mm and 90 mm width. Both front and rear leaf springs are 1,500 mm long; the front springs consist of 11 leaves, rear springs have got 16 each.

=== Cabin ===
The three-seat, full steel cabin is heat and sound insulated, and the interior is fully upholstered. The two-piece windscreen is curved and made from laminated glass. The driver's seat can be adjusted vertically and horizontally, and it is sprung and damped. The heater fan is two-speed and the nozzles are located at windscreen, legroom and both ends of the dashboard. The windscreen wipers are with separate motors.

The last conventional type Vanaja lorries produced featured the Sisu R-series cabin.

=== Dimensions and weights ===
The contemporary Finnish legislation allowed a total weight of 16 tonnes for the two-axle variants. The three-axle models were allowed to be loaded up to total weight of 22 tonnes.

Dimensions and weights of some of the variants are listed in the below table. The manufacturer allowed an extra long platform with restricted total weight; those values are shown in Italic. The structural total weights differed from the nominal values; for example R-142 was allowed to be loaded up to 26 tonnes total weight in off-road use.

Model	Layout	Wheelbase	Kerb weight	Permitted load	Max. gross weight	Max. length of platform
R-141BPT	4×2	4,350 mm	5,810 kg	10,190 kg	14,500 – 16,000 kg	4,390 – 5,720 mm
R-141BPT	4×2	4,650 mm	5,830 kg	10,170 kg	14,500 – 16,000 kg	4,830 – 6,220 mm
R-141BPT	4×2	5,950 mm	6,110 kg	9,890 kg	15,100 – 16,000 kg	7,120 – 8,100 mm
R-141DST	4×2	4,350 mm	6,200 kg	9,800 kg	14,000 – 16,000 kg	4,700 – 5,800 mm
R-141DST	4×2	4,650 mm	6,330 kg	9,670 kg	14,900 – 16,000 kg	5,300 – 6,400 mm
R-141DST	4×2	5,950 mm	6,510 kg	9,490 kg	15,400 – 16,000 kg	7,650 – 8,400 mm
R-141DET	4×2	4,350 mm	6,400 kg	9,600 kg	14,900 – 16,000 kg	4,800 – 5,800 mm
R-141DET	4×2	4,650 mm	6,530 kg	9,470 kg	15,000 – 16,000 kg	5,400 – 6,400 mm
R-141DET	4×2	5,950 mm	6,610 kg	9,390 kg	15,500 – 16,000 kg	7,800 – 8,400 mm
R-142BPT	6×2	3,800 mm + 1,200 mm	7,230 kg	14,770 kg	20,600 – 22,000 kg	4,980 – 5,810 mm
R-142BPT	6×2	4,050 mm + 1,200 mm	7,270 kg	14,730 kg	20,850 – 22,000 kg	5,500 – 6,220 mm
R-142BPT	6×2	4,650 mm + 1,200 mm	7,300 kg	14,700 kg	21,050 – 22,000 kg	6,550 – 7,210 mm
R-142BPT	6×2	5,050 mm + 1,200 mm	7,470 kg	14,530 kg	21,350 – 22,000 kg	7,330 – 7,800 mm
R-142CST	6×2	3,800 mm + 1,200 mm	7,580 kg	14,420 kg	21,000 – 22,000 kg	5,180 – 5,810 mm
R-142CST	6×2	4,050 mm + 1,200 mm	7,640 kg	14,360 kg	21,200 – 22,000 kg	5,690 – 6,220 mm
R-142CST	6×2	4,650 mm + 1,200 mm	7,700 kg	14,300 kg	21,800 – 22,000 kg	7,030 – 7,210 mm
R-142CST	6×2	5,050 mm + 1,200 mm	7,820 kg	14,200 kg	21,800 – 22,000 kg	7,610 – 7,800 mm
R-142CEV and DET	6×2	3,800 mm + 1,200 mm	7,770 kg	14,230 kg	21,100 – 22,000 kg	5,300 – 5,900 mm
R-142CEV and DET	6×2	4,200 mm + 1,200 mm	7,820 kg	14,180 kg	21,100 – 22,000 kg	6,050 – 6,700 mm
R-142CEV and DET	6×2	4,650 mm + 1,200 mm	7,960 kg	14,040 kg	21,300 – 22,000 kg	6,950 – 7,480 mm
R-142CEV and DET	6×2	5,050 mm + 1,200 mm	8,040 kg	13,960 kg	21,600 – 22,000 kg	7,800 – 8,100 mm
R-142CZT and DST	6×2	3,800 mm + 1,200 mm	7,570 kg	14,430 kg	21,000 – 22,000 kg	5,150 – 5,810 mm
R-142CZT and DST	6×2	4,050 mm + 1,200 mm	7,620 kg	14,380 kg	21,200 – 22,000 kg	5,650 – 6,370 mm
R-142CZT and DST	6×2	4,650 mm + 1,200 mm	7,760 kg	14,240 kg	21,400 – 22,000 kg	7,000 – 7,480 mm
R-142CZT and DST	6×2	5,050 mm + 1,200 mm	7,840 kg	14,160 kg	21,400 – 22,000 kg	7,600 – 8,100 mm
R-143CST	6×4	3,800 mm + 1,370 mm	8,370 kg	13,630 kg	21,300 – 22,000 kg	5,470 – 5,950 mm
R-143CZT	6×4	3,800 mm + 1,370 mm	8,370 kg	13,630 kg	21,000 – 22,000 kg	5,450 – 6,070 mm
R-143CZT	6×4	4,800 mm + 1,370 mm	8,370 kg	13,630 kg	21,300 – 22,000 kg	7,250 – 7,880 mm
R-149BPT	6×4	3,800 mm + 1,270 mm	7,120 kg	14,880 kg	21,000 – 22,000 kg	5,240 – 5,870 mm
R-149BPT	6×4	4,800 mm + 1,270 mm	7,330 kg	14,670 kg	21,500 – 22,000 kg	7,150 – 7,120 mm

== Sources ==
- Mäkipirtti, Markku (2011). Sisu. Ajoneuvot Suomessa (in Finnish). Vol. 4 (2. ed.). Tampere: Apali Oy. ISBN 978-952-5877-05-2.
- Blomberg, Olli (2006). Suomalaista Sisua vuodesta 1931 – Monialaosaajasta kuorma-autotehtaaksi [Finnish Sisu since 1931 – From multi-industrial expert to lorry factory] (in Finnish). Karis: Oy Sisu Auto Ab. ISBN 952-91-4918-2.
