= Sisu Nemo =

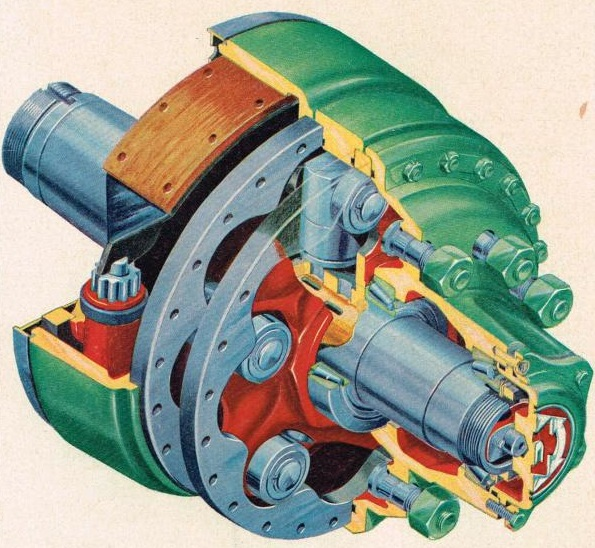
Schematic of Sisu Nemo structure

Sisu Nemo is a hydraulic radial piston motor type developed and initially produced by Suomen Autoteollisuus (SAT). The system was patented in 1961.

The motor produces a high torque at low speed and it has been primarily used to power both civil and military lorry trailers. A number of other applications have been designated for various industrial applications.

== Development ==
The idea of the motor came from DI Ilmari Louhio who worked in SAT as design engineer. The operating principle was so simple, that when Louhio presented his invention to the technical department and company management, he was not taken seriously; the answer was "if that would work, someone would have invented it for long ago". However, Louhio didn't give up and in 1959 a team was set up to develop the concept. The members were Louhio, Pentti Tarvainen, Antti Saarialho and Lasse Airola; in addition, dozens of people from different departments took part in the development work. A number of prototypes were built and put through intense testing before the design was ready for production. The first field test took place in autumn 1960, with a Fordson Major tractor pulling a hydraulically driven trailer. A patent was granted for the invention in January 1961, which was named Nemo, from nestemoottori ("fluid motor").

== Operating principle ==
The motor contains five fixed radial hydraulic cylinders, whose pistons end in rollers that in turn press outward against a ring whose inner profile consists of eight cams. As the pistons expand in turn, the rollers force the ring to rotate, a full rotation occurring after eight strokes from each piston. The hub consists of a distribution valve that adjusts the flow in and out of each cylinder. A drum brake may be integrated with the motor and the combined unit fitted into a 20-inch rim.

Despite its small size, the system can deliver 8,000–10,000 newton metres of torque, so a separate planetary gear set is generally not required. Due to the large number (40) of piston movements per rotation, the torque is also smooth. If the pistons are all withdrawn into the hub, the rollers are not in contact with the cam ring, and the wheel can freewheel.

The system also contains a twin pump unit attached to the free end of the towing vehicle engine. One of the elements can be bypassed, which halves the transmission ratio.

== Applications ==
=== Logging trucks ===
The first Nemo applications for vehicles to be used on roads came in 1963–1964. Nemo was successfully tested in logging vehicle trailers. In addition to improved off-road performance the system had other benefits; a trailer with a driven front axle could be driven on the lorry platform for transition and set down when the place of loading was reached. When full laden, the Nemo could be used to assist on steep uphills: in case the driver had to gear down, he could switch on the hydraulic drive that was powered directly by the engine, and use clutch and change the gear without risk that the vehicle would stop going. Nemo systems were available for example for Sisu KB-117, M-162 and K-142 logging trucks.

=== Military vehicles ===
In the 1960s the Finnish Defence Forces had 1800 field cannons. The number of suitable haulers was so small that in case of mobilisation, moving the cannons would have relied on civil lorries. The Nemo system was seen as a solution to improve the mobility.

In 1965 one of new Tampella 122 K 60 cannons was equipped with a tandem axle driven by the Nemo transmission system. This was tested with single wheels at first but later double wheels were used. The hauler was a Sisu KB-45 off-road lorry with a hydraulic system mounted on the front end and the oil container installed between the cabin and platform. This was tested in Santahamina during summer 1967, with the KB-45 hauling an SAT-produced trailer. The KB-45 had a weight of 6490 kg and traction of 48000 N⋅m; the trailer weighed 5220 kg and delivered 30000 N⋅m; the combination produced 72000 N⋅m. The effect of the tyre size was not considered. Later the system was tested with a Sisu K-141 4×2 together with a field cannon 130 K 54 and Vanaja KK-69 ET 6×6 coupled with a three-axle carriage powered by a separate aggregate-run pump. The test proved even these trucks, not designed for off-road use, could haul heavy cannons in rough terrain using the Nemo system. During the trials it was observed that the trailers even pushed their haulers forward.

Equipping all the cannons and most of the haulers with Nemo was conceivable. In 1968 the price of Nemo was 30000 Finnish marks, divided in half between the hauler and carriage. This price was high compared to a normal truck (50000–60000 marks), but was cheaper than an AT-S tracked cannon hauler (130000 marks). Nevertheless, only a small number of vehicles and cannons were ordered with the Nemo system – thirteen Nemo-compatible Sisu AH-45 lorries in 1970. At the same time the Nemo transmission was mounted on howitzer 152 H 38, field cannon 130 K 54 and 122 K 60; the latter one was with a tandem axle. One artillery battalion was armed with Nemo-driven 130 K 54 cannons. In 1976 the Defence Forces took a delivery of fourteen more Sisu AH-45's and next year followed a batch of thirteen vehicles more. Eventually, the Defence Forces had three artillery battalions motorised by Nemo-compatible Sisu's.

The Nemo was further tested in an ammunition trailer prototype equipped with Nemo driven posterior axle; the brakes were built into the fore axle. The motors were built in a such manner that the trailer had an extra high ground clearance. The prototype did not lead to serial orders.

=== Industrial applications ===
A number of applications were designed for machinery and industrial use; these include rear-wheel drive of an articulated dumper truck, excavator transmission, mining train transmission, telescopic crane extractor motor, mobile portal crane transmission and a ferry wire winding motor.

== Production ==
The first motors were produced in the Sisu axle factory that was located then in Helsinki. Serial production began in 1963. In 1973 the company made a decision to transfer the Nemo production to another organisation. SAT founded a separate company Nesco Oy jointly with Multilift (40%) and investment fund Sponsor (20%). The production was moved to Iisalmi where it shared the premises with Multilift demountable skip factory. Production was sold to Partek in 1977. Later the Nemo's were produced in Valmet gear works from which it was moved on to Valmet Hydraulics Oy in Jyskä. Valmet became later a part of Metso Corporation and the company was renamed Metso Hydraulics in 2001. In 2003 Metso sold the unit to Sampo Rosenlew and it got again a new name, Sampo Hydraulics. The motors are currently produced under brand Black Bruin.

The Kelsey-Hayes Company produced the Nemo under licence in the US.
