= List of Finnish government enterprises =

This is a list of Finnish government owned companies:

== Wholly owned ==
- Alko
- OHY Arsenal
- CSC - Tieteellinen laskenta
- Destia
- Finavia
- Finnvera
- Hansel Ltd.
- Motiva
- Nordic Morning
- Patria
- Rahapaja (Mint of Finland)
- Solidium
- Suomen Erillisverkot
- Finnish Industry Investment
- Suomen Vientiluotto
- Suomen Viljava
- VR Group

== Shared majority ownership ==
- Boreal Plant Breeding
- Finnair
- Fortum
- Gasum
- HAUS Finnish Institute of Public Management
- Kemijoki
- Neste Oil
- Posti Group
- Raskone
- Finnfund
- Tietokarhu (a joint venture with Tieto)
- Neova
- Veikkaus
- Finnish Broadcasting Company

== Shared minority ownership ==
- Altia
- Ekokem
- Engel Yhtymä
- Fingrid
- Gasum
- Licentia
- Santapark
- Silta
- Suomen Siemenperunakeskus
- Vuotekno
- Companies in state-owned investment company Solidium's portfolio:
  - Elisa
  - Kemira
  - Outokumpu
  - Outotec
  - Rautaruukki
  - Sampo
  - Stora Enso
  - Talvivaara
  - TeliaSonera
  - Tieto

== Commercial Government Agencies ==
- Metsähallitus (Forest and Park Service)
- Senate Properties

== Defunct ==
- VPU Pukutehdas

== See also ==
- Government of Finland
- List of Finnish companies
- List of government-owned companies
- Economy of Finland
