= Kemijoki (company) =

Finnish hydropower company

Kemijoki Oy
- Company type: Limited company
- Industry: Electricity generation
- Founded: 1954; 71 years ago
- Headquarters: Rovaniemi, Finland
- Area served: Finland
- Key people: CEO Tuomas Timonen, Chairman Mikael Lemström
- Products: Hydropower
- Revenue: €96.5 million (2023)
- Operating income: €10.3 million (2023)
- Net income: €0.8 million (2023)
- Owner: Government of Finland (50.1%)
- Number of employees: 42 (2023)
- Website: kemijoki.fi

Kemijoki Oy is a Finnish hydropower company founded in 1954. It specializes in energy production.

Kemijoki Oy is Finland's largest producer of hydropower, operating 20 power plants. The company's headquarters are in Rovaniemi, and it is majority-owned by the Government of Finland.

== Power plants ==
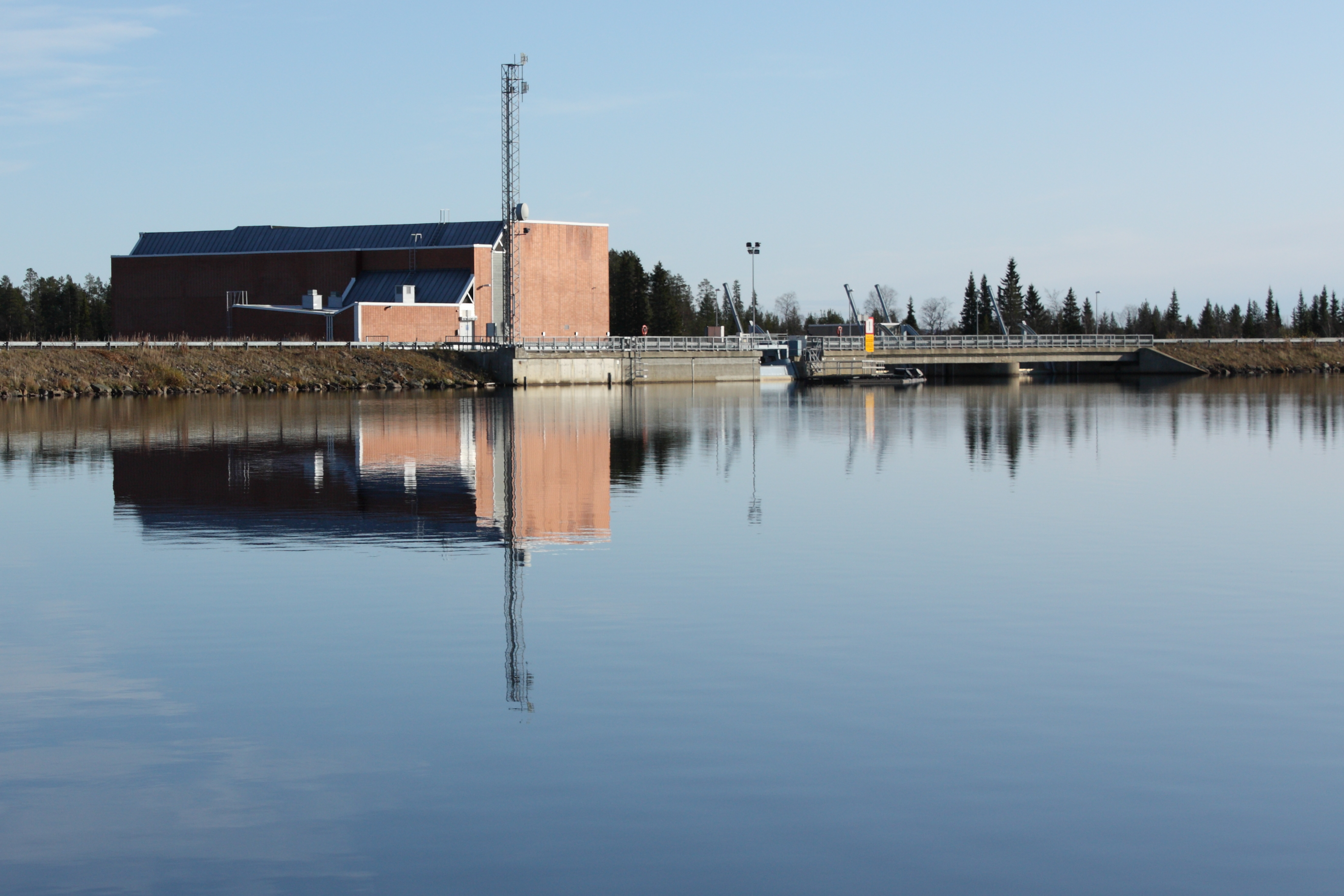
Kokkosniva hydropower plant on the Kitinen river in Pelkosenniemi

Kemijoki Oy owns 20 hydropower plants, 16 of which are located in the Kemijoki river basin, two in the Lieksanjoki river, and two in the Kymijoki river. The company regulates the Lokka and Porttipahta reservoirs, as well as Kemijärvi and Olkkajärvi.

Kemijoki Oy's power plants as of 2024:

- Anjalankoski
- Inkeroinen
- Kelukoski
- Kokkosniva
- Kurkiaska
- Kurittukoski
- Lieksankoski
- Lokka
- Matarakoski
- Ossauskoski
- Pankakoski
- Permantokoski
- Petäjäskoski
- Pirttikoski
- Porttipahta
- Seitakorva
- Taivalkoski
- Vajukoski
- Valajaskoski
- Vanttauskoski

== See also ==
- List of Finnish government enterprises
