= Patria PML 127 OWS =

Finnish remote weapon station

PML 127 OWS
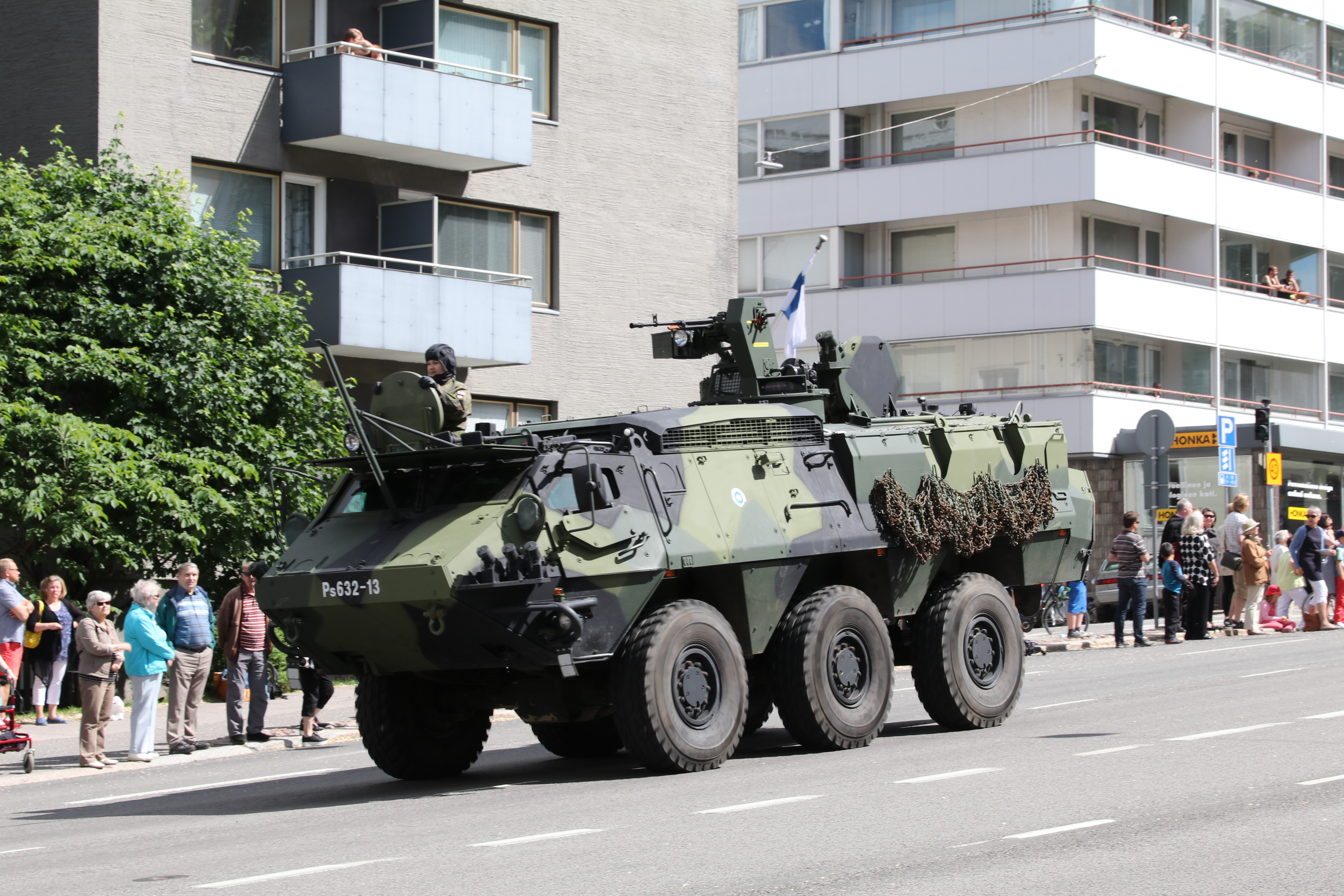
- A PML 127 OWS atop a Patria XA-203.
- Type: Remote controlled weapon station
- Place of origin: Finland

Service history
- Used by: See Operators

Production history
- Designer: Patria
- Manufacturer: Patria

Specifications
- Elevation: −8° to +47°
- Traverse: 360°

The Patria PML 127 OWS (overhead weapon system) is a Finnish-developed remote weapon station (RWS) which mounts a 12.7 mm NSV machine gun and smoke canister dischargers.

The turret is electro-hydraulically driven and can traverse in a full 360° circle and can elevate between −8° and +47°.

The operator has a Zeiss PERI-Z16A1 day gun sight and NAE-200 night gunsight with GEN II+ image intensifier. The system can also be fitted with a CCD or thermal camera.

It can be mounted to various vehicles. It is manufactured by Patria.

== Operators ==
Finland
XA-203
