= NG Nordic =

Finnish waste management company

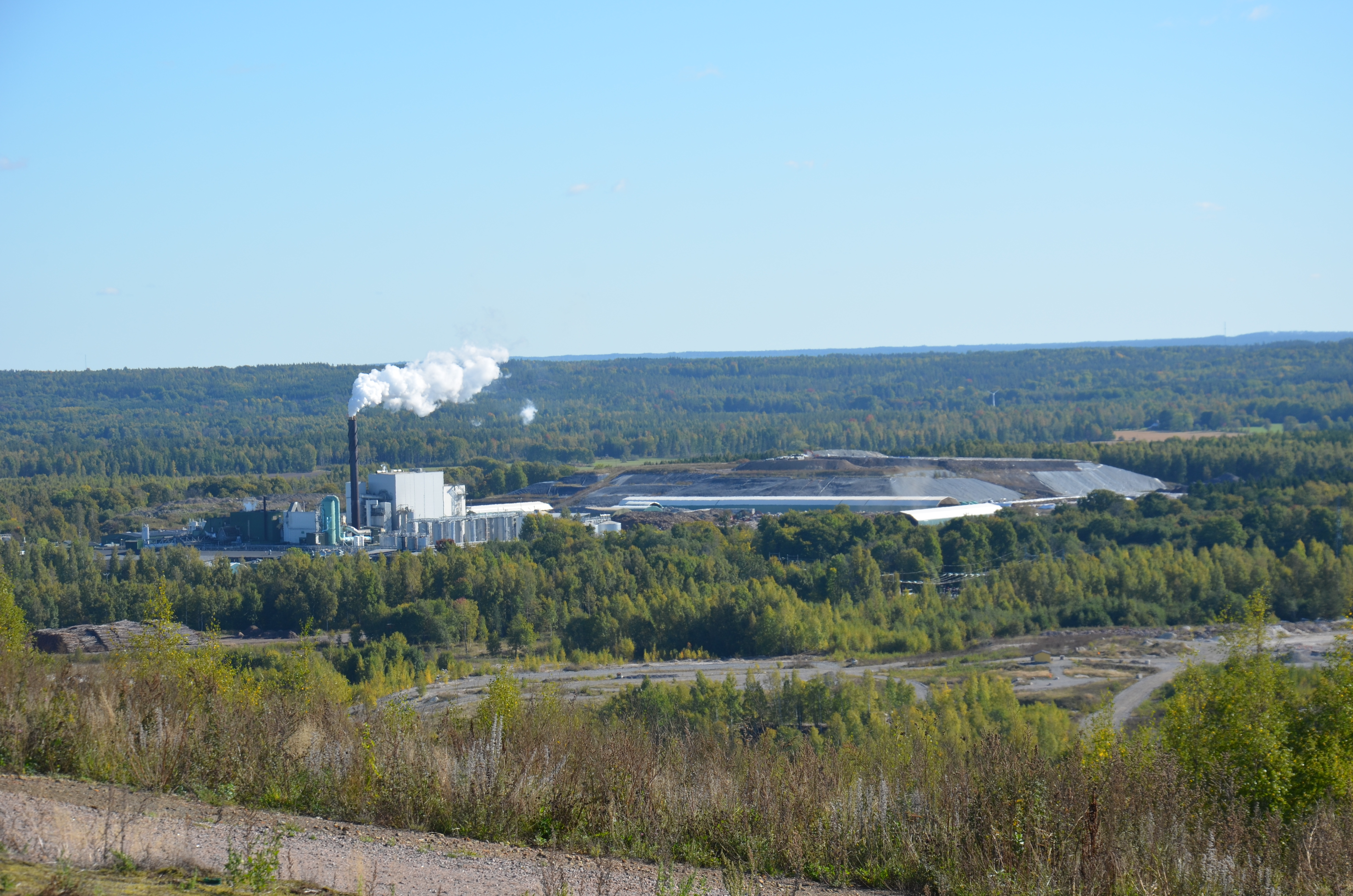
- SAKAB Kvarntorp, Sweden
- Type: Limited company (osakeyhtiö)
- Industry: Waste management
- Founded: 1979; 47 years ago
- Headquarters: Riihimäki, Finland
- Areas served: Finland, Sweden, Denmark
- Revenue: €163,652,000 (2021)
- Owner: Summa Equity
- Number of employees: 370 (2021)

NG Nordic (formerly Ekokem and Fortum Waste Solutions Oy) is a Finnish company that provides recycling and waste management services for industries, cities, and communities. It was a part of Fortum Corporation until 2024, when Fortum agreed to sell its recycling and waste business to Summa Equity for approximately €800 million. The transaction was completed at the end of 2024, and Fortum Recycling & Waste and NG Group were combined under the name NG Nordic.

The company covers a network of over 30 offices in Finland, Sweden, and Denmark.

In 2014, the Organisation for the Prohibition of Chemical Weapons (OPCW) selected NG Nordic as one of the companies to incinerate wastes produced in destruction of Syria's chemical weapons.

== History ==
=== Suomen Ongelmajäte and Ekokem 1979-2016 ===
Oy Suomen Ongelmajäte - Finlands Problemavfall Ab was founded in 1979 in Riihimäki. The company was named Ekokem Oy Ab from 1985 to 2014, and Ekokem Oyj from 2014 to 2017.

In 2014, Ekokem participated in the operation to destroy Syria's chemical weapons. The first batch of waste from Syria arrived in Finland at Midsummer 2014, the second batch in July, and the third cargo in August. Fortum Waste Solutions destroyed a total of approximately 300 tonnes of retrieved industrial chemicals. The waste arriving from Syria was incinerated in a high-temperature kiln at 1,050-1,200 degrees Celsius; the long residence time of the waste in the kiln ensured complete combustion. Receiving the chemicals in Finland for destruction was a highly significant contribution to the Syrian chemical weapons destruction process. Ekokem participated in the task, which was part of a wider operation, under the joint supervision of the OPCW and the United Nations. The material to be destroyed consisted of 500 tonnes of industrial chemicals as well as millions of liters of toxic waste.

=== Fortum Waste Solutions 2017- ===
In August 2016, the Finnish energy company Fortum acquired Ekokem Oyj, and since the spring of 2017, the company has used the name Fortum Waste Solutions Oy.

In 2017, the refinery processed approximately 6,000 tonnes of consumer plastic packaging waste; in 2018, the amount was approximately 10,000 tonnes. In the autumn of 2018, a new processing line was opened at the refinery, tripling its production capacity to approximately 30,000 tonnes per year.

In early 2019, Fortum announced that it would begin recycling electric vehicle batteries. According to Fortum, a new hydrometallurgical recycling process allows for up to 80 percent of a lithium-ion battery to be recycled, compared to the previous 50 percent. Using technology developed by the Finnish company Crisolteq, the batteries are first made safe for mechanical processing, after which plastics, aluminum, and copper are separated from one another and directed to their own recycling processes. The recovered cobalt, manganese, and nickel are delivered to battery manufacturers for the production of new batteries. Fortum's goal is to recycle batteries collected from all over Europe in Finland.

== See also ==
- List of Finnish government enterprises
