= Patria Pasi variants =

The Patria Pasi is a military armoured personnel carrier. It was the choice of the Finnish Defence Forces to replace its aging Soviet BTR-60s. It was a result of the commercial competition between two Finnish companies, a tractor manufacturer Valmet and the lorry manufacturer Sisu Auto, which won the contract with its prototype.

== Prototypes and series ==
Patria Pasis have been produced in various models for various purposes. Originally Panssari-Sisu, was not produced by Patria, but by Sisu, a lorry manufacturer. The other entry as a possible armoured personnel carrier replacement for the Finnish Defense Force's BTR-60 was Panssari-Valmet, which did not win the competition.

Technically the variants of Pasi are marked with two letters XA, which means cross-country armoured vehicle, the first and second number means the power in tens of kilowatts. Therefore, Pasi XA-180 means that it is a cross-country armoured vehicle (XA) having an engine capable for 180 kW (18× 10 kW). The last number, 0, means that XA-180 is the first version of the 180 kW Pasi's.

== Manufacturing companies ==
The name of the manufacturer has changed several times. Up until 1980, the producer was known as Oy Suomen Autoteollisuus Ab. In 1981, it changed its name to Oy Sisu Auto Ab, which reflected the name of the Sisu branded lorries Suomen Autoteollisuus had manufactured. In 1994, Oy Sisu-Auto Ab purchased Valmet Oy's forest tractor and harvester business, and additionally the production of the tractors and engines. Oy Sisu Ab was founded to function as the holding company of all the new entities and the old Oy Sisu-Auto Ab. For the lorry production, a new Oy Sisu-Auto Ab, now Oy Sisu Auto Ab, was founded.

In 1995, the military vehicle production profit center of Oy Sisu Ab, Sisu Defence is changed into a separate subsidiary company Sisu Defence Oy, which continues the military vehicle production with Masi, Misu, Nasu, Pasi, Rasi and Raisu lorries. In 1996, Sisu Defence was sold to Suomen Puolustusväline Oy, which is a state owned company. In 1997, Sisu Defence Oy merged with Suomen Puolustusväline to become Patria Vehicles Oy.

- 1980 Oy Suomen Autoteollisuus Ab
- 1981 Oy Sisu Auto Ab
- 1994 Oy Sisu Auto Ab, Sisu Defence profit center of Oy Sisu Ab
- 1995 Sisu Defence Oy
- 1997 Patria Vehicles Oy
- 2008 Patria Land & Armament Oy

== 180 kW Pasis ==
=== XA-180 (Finland) ===
- XA-180M: A mid-life upgrade to extend the use of Pasi APCs to the 2030s. The upgrade includes improved mine protection and refurbishing or replacing electrical systems and powertrain components. A prototype vehicle was completed in 2014 and Patria has been given a contract to upgrade 70 vehicles manufactured in the 1980s between 2015 and 2017. There is an additional option to upgrade further 210 vehicles by 2021.

== Prototype history ==
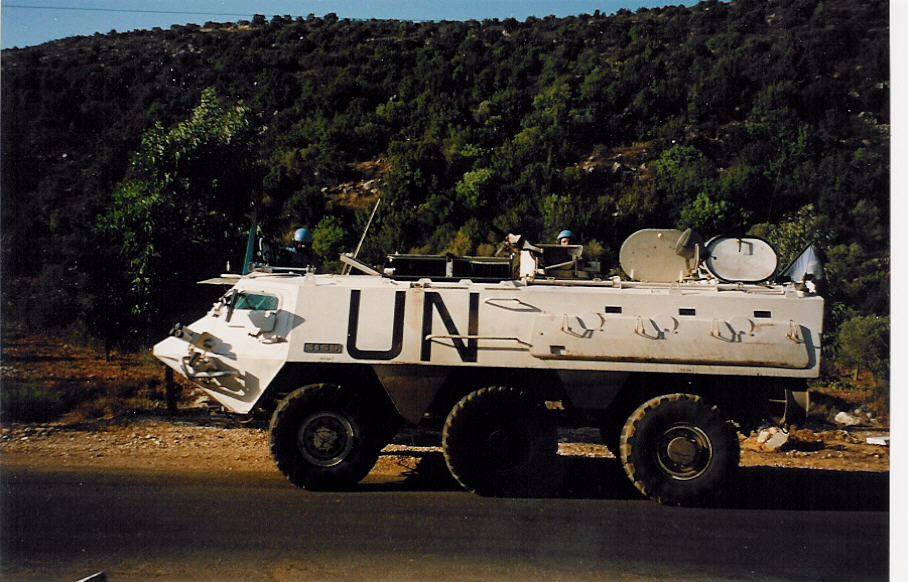
A Finnish XA-180 in the UNIFIL operation in Lebanon

The prototype of XA-180 was produced by Sisu Auto in 1980 for the tests. Another type, which was ordered for tests was made by a tractor manufacturer Valmet (now Valtra). In 1983, Sisu XA-180 was chosen as the armoured personnel carrier for the defence forces of Finland. On 22 December 1983, first 41 Sisus were ordered for the defence forces itself and nine were reserved for the peace-keeping activities of the United Nations. The defence forces of Finland has 425 XA-180 and XA-185 types Pasis.

== Armouring ==
The main superstructure was manufactured from 6 mm to 12 mm armour steel. The bottom parts of the vehicle were mine strengthened. The windows are bullet-resistant and equipped with protective hatches. As for the off-road qualities XA-180 can take inclines up to maximum of 60°.

XA-180 is amphibious like XA-185. XA-186 is not amphibious like XA-202; XA-203 and XA-360 are not either.

=== XA-180EST (Estonia) ===
XA-180
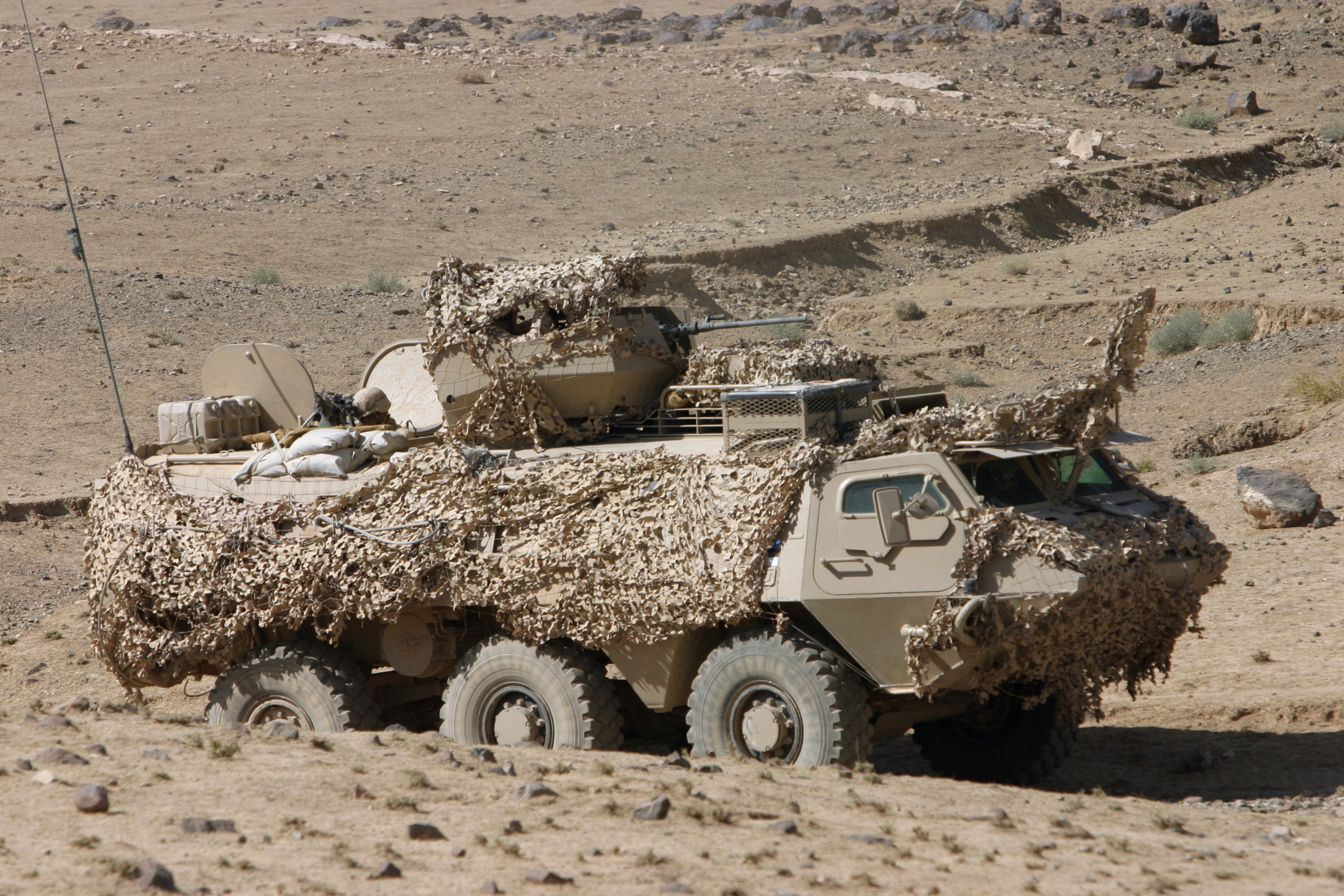
- An Estonian XA-180EST in Afghanistan
- Type: Armoured personnel carrier
- Place of origin: Finland

Service history
- In service: 58; 2005–present day
- Used by: Estonia

Production history
- Manufacturer: Oy Sisu-Auto Ab (→1994); Sisu Defence Oy (1994–1997); Patria Vehicles Oy (1997→)
- Produced: 1986

Specifications
- Mass: 13.5 tonnes
- Length: 7.35 m
- Width: 2.90 m
- Height: 2.77 m
- Crew: 2+16
- Armour: 10+3 mm
- Main armament: 1x 12.7mm Browning machine gun 10000 rounds
- Engine: Valmet 611 DSBJA diesel engine 236 bhp
- Power/weight: 17.48 hp/tonne
- Suspension: 6×6 wheeled
- Operational range: 900 km
- Maximum speed: 100 km/h, swim 10 km/h

XA-180EST is the Estonian model of XA-180. The first version was produced in 1983 and serial production began in 1984. The basic design was based on easy usage, simple basic structure and low cost maintenance. The basic appearance and configuration is similar to most wheeled APCs.

There are 58 of them in service, two having been lost in Afghanistan. Finland had sold 61 of them, of which four were medevac models, two command post models and two command and control models. In 2005, there were delivered ordinary ones 30 units and four medevac units. In 2005, 35 units of XA-180ESTs, 2006 21 units and 2007 5 units were transferred to Estonia.

Altogether there were 51 ordinary units, two command and control units, three repair units and four medevac units. The medevac units were equipped with air conditioning and floor heaters. The XA-180ESTs were equipped with Harris radios and 12.7 mm Browning M2 machine guns.

The XA-180ESTs had been manufactured in Finland in 1987–1989 having been used for from 10,000 to 30,000 km. The engine will last about 120,000 to 130,000 km. Ten out of the sixty vehicles have been taken part in the Lebanon peace-keeping operations and the others have been mainly stored or being used in the military training in Finland.

Estonia wanted to buy 30 more XAs from Finland in 2008, but as a part of agreement, Finland wanted them not to be used outside the territory of Estonia, i.e. in the international operations with the coalition of the willing. Therefore, Estonia purchased 81 units of XA-188 from the Netherlands (see below). Also the price was considered to be high for the Estonians.

=== XA-181 (Finland) ===
XA-181s are like XA-180s, but as designation they have been equipped for the use of anti-aircraft artillery target directing radar, MOSTKA87M, earlier MOSTKA87, anti-aircraft missile launcher for ITO90M, earlier ITO90. Finland has 21 units of Crotale NG (VT-1) systems.

Crotale NG (VT-1) is an updated version, New Generation. Finland was the first operator of the system. The cost of the system is roughly 8 million euros (excluding the vehicle). Greece is another user, and paid 1 Billion French Francs in 1998 for 11 systems: 9 for the Hellenic Air Force and 2 for the Hellenic Navy. In 2002 euros, that would have amounted up to 12 million euros per unit.

=== XA-182 (Finland) ===
XA-182 has a Jantronic J-1000 radar target acquisition radar system including Ericsson Giraffe Mk IV radar.

==== Other ====
Some XA-180s are furnished to function as medical evacuation vehicles as well as NBC reconnaissance units (XA-185ST). Pasi is also used as an armoured fire engine to combat fires in ammunition dumps or other areas with explosive hazards. The fire engine equipment is installed to a normal APC version and does not require structural modifications to the vehicle.

=== XA-185 (Finland) ===
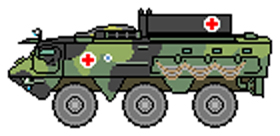
XA-185 Medevac

- XA-185 ambulance
- XA-185 - command post vehicle (KOPA; command post) with radios and antennas
- XA-185 - with 30 mm cannon
- XA-185 with surveillance radar
- XA-185 recovery vehicle: repair and maintenance
- XA-185 TOW : anti-tank missile

The defence forces of Denmark leased 11 XA-185s from Finland. Four of them were to be stationed in Bosnia, four other ones in Kosovo and three were left in Denmark for training purposes. The four ambulance models came in December 2001 and the other four ones were to arrive in mid February 2002 and the last three ones in mid March 2002.

=== XA-186 (Norway) ===
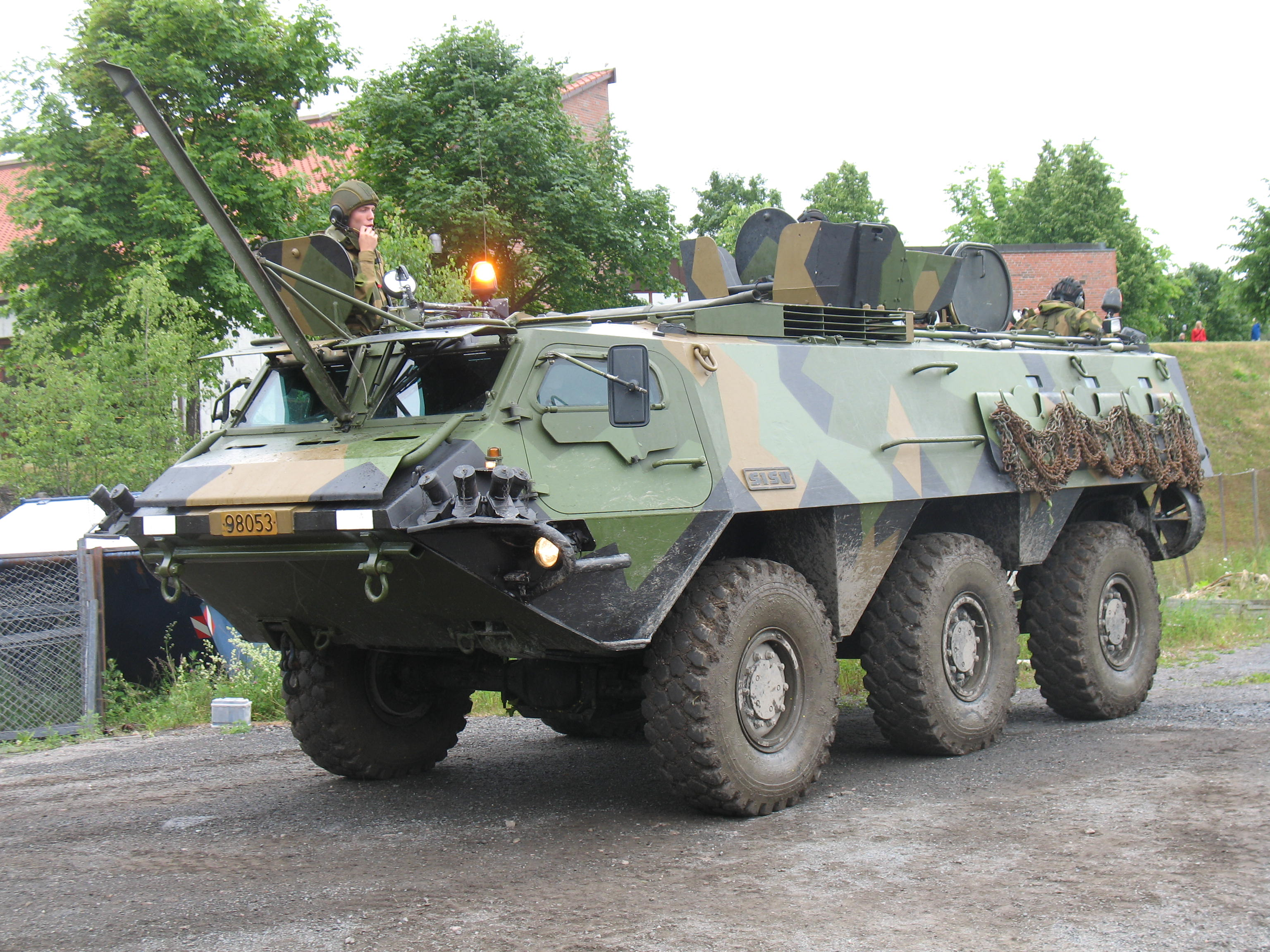
His majesty's royal guards' Sisu XA-185 n:o 98053 (Photograph: Kjetil Ree)

- XA-186 has improved armour according to NATO demands
- XA-186NO : Norwegian model, 22 units total
  - XA-186NO Recovery
  - XA-186NO command post vehicle

=== XA-188 ===
- The Netherlands obtained 24 units in 1998 and a further 66 units were delivered to the Netherlands in 1999. The XA-188 is originally a Dutch export version of the APC.
- Estonia obtained 81 units of the former Dutch XA-188s in 2011 which will be included into the Estonia's 1st Infantry Brigade between 2011 and 2015. These complement the 61 units of XA-180EST models which Estonia had already acquired (see above).

== 200 kW Pasis ==
Patria Vehicles Oy Defence forces of Sweden, 104 units for €70,000,000 for the peace-keeping activities in 2002. The deliveries took place in 2001–2002.

=== XA-202 (Sweden) ===
XA-202 has more room in the rear part of the vehicle and is basically designed for command, control and communications purposes. It has room for four other soldiers and it is equipped with for the possibility of 24-metres-long radio mast for directional antenna.

- XA-202S command post and communications vehicle. In 2003, 51 XA-202 and XA-203 was delivered to Sweden from Finland.

=== XA-203 ===
- XA-203S troop carrier with quick-change interior configuration with special kits for use in the casualty evacuation, maintenance, command and logistics role. Most of the turrets armed with 20 mm cannons. A 22.5 tonne XA-203S carries eight soldiers and crew of two or three and eight other soldiers. In 2003, 51 XA-202 and XA-203 was delivered to Sweden from Finland and in 2004 25 XA-203s.

== Gallery ==
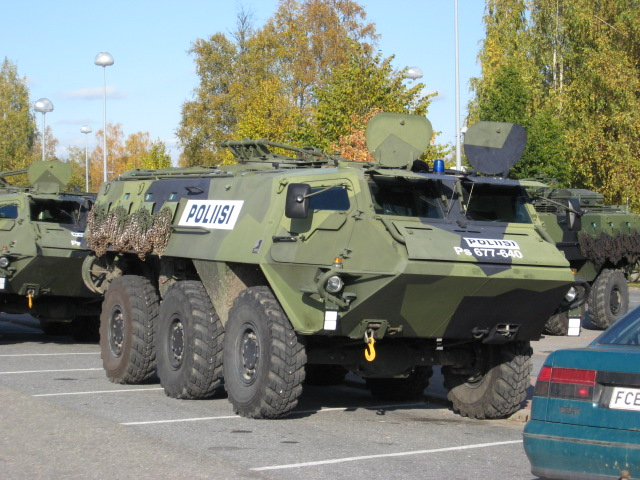
A XA-180 armoured personnel carrier on display in Turku during Finnish Navy 2014 anniversary

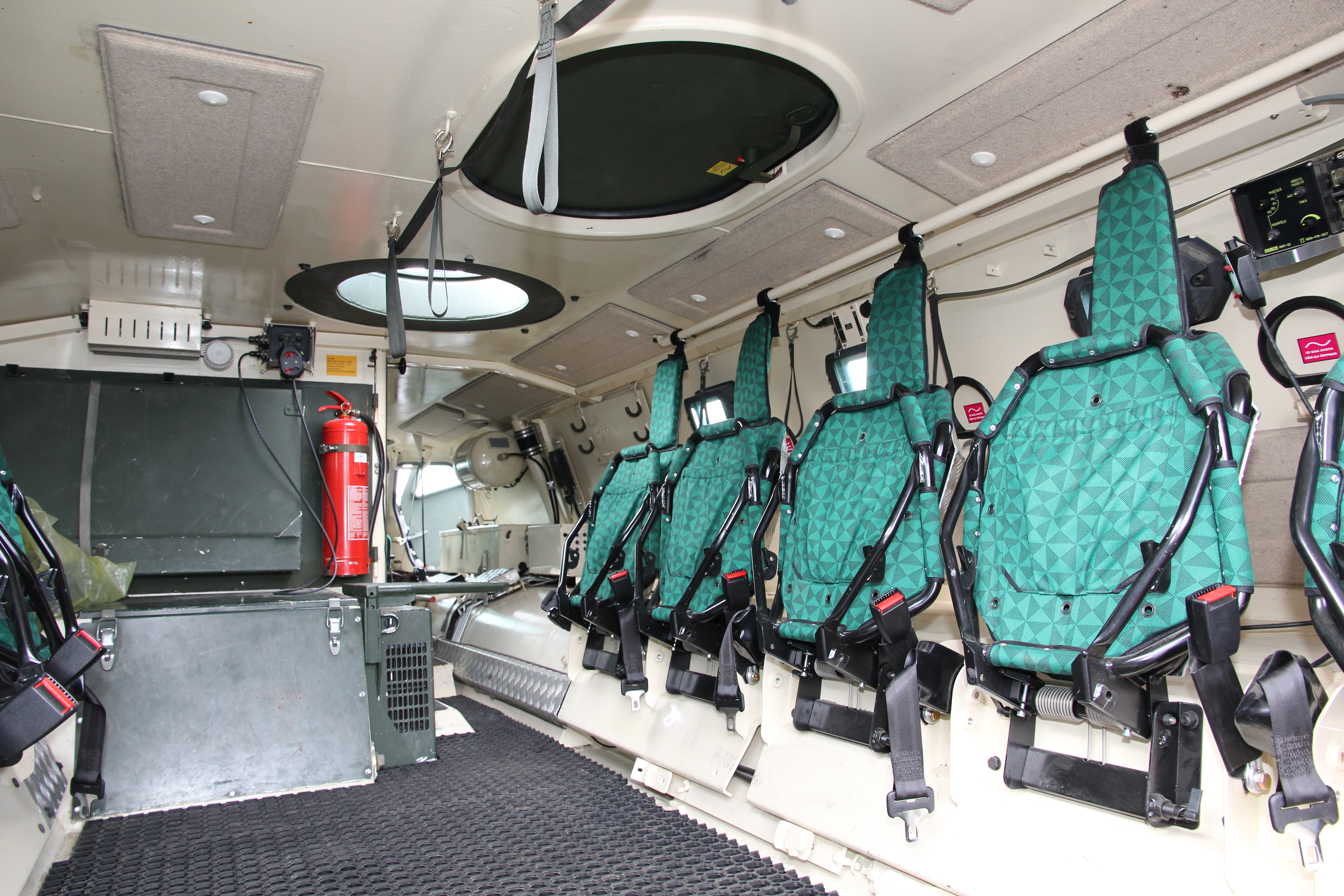
Interior of Finnish military modernized Pasi XA-180M armoured personnel carrier

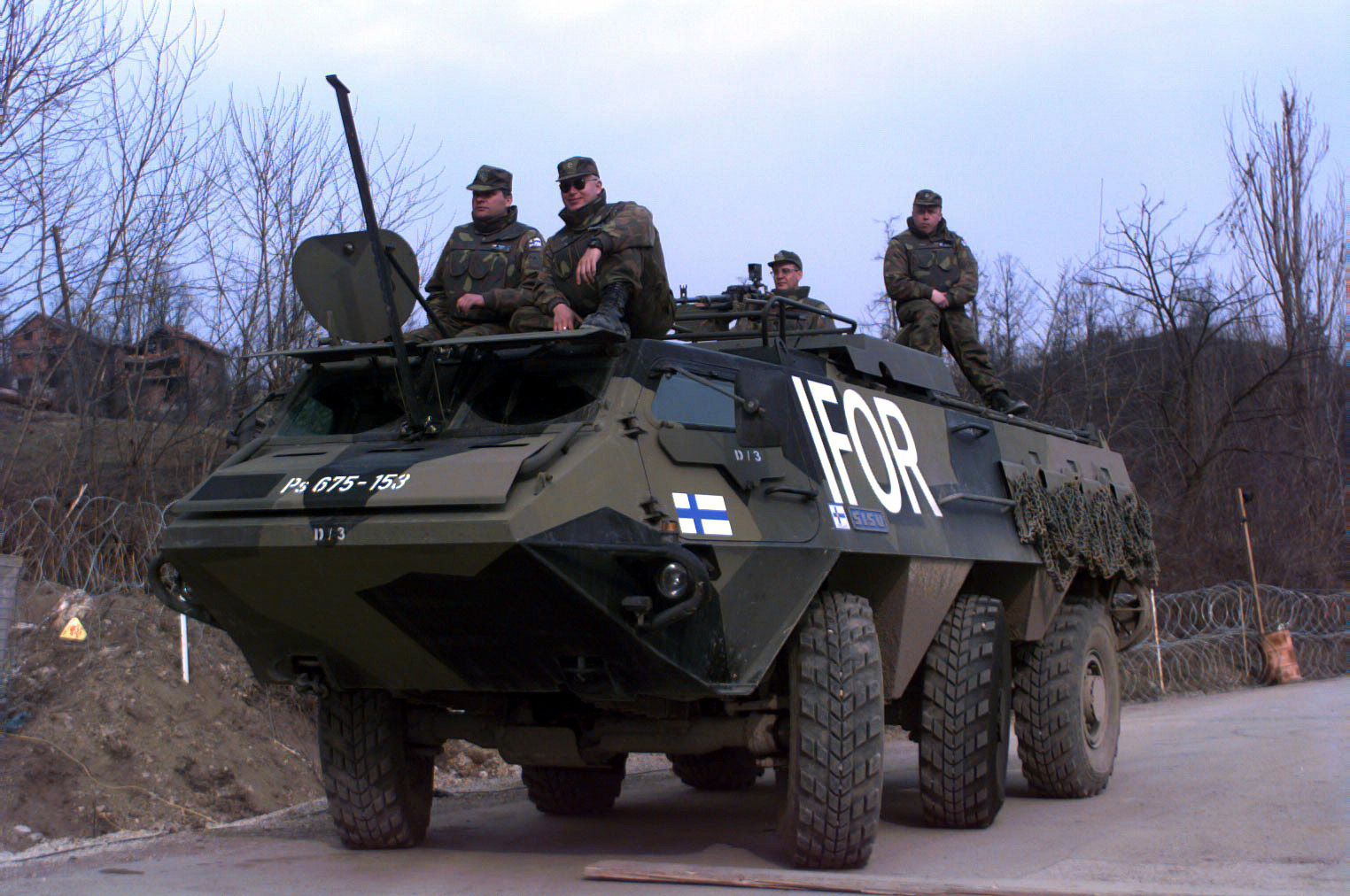
A SISU XA-180 APC armoured personnel carrier stationed at a checkpoint in Bosnia-Herzegovina on March 26, 1996
