= VIRVE =

- Viranomaisradioverkko
- Type: Public safety network
- Location: Finland
- Protocols: Terrestrial Trunked Radio
- Use: Police; fire departments; health care; border patrol; customs; military police; railways
- Owner: State Security Networks
- Established: 2002; 23 years ago
- Website: www.virve.com

VIRVE (short for "Viranomaisradioverkko", government official radio network) is the Finnish authorities' telecommunications network. It is based on the Terrestrial Trunked Radio (TETRA) standard. It is one of few nationwide TETRA networks in the world.

== History ==
The VIRVE network was created for the authorities to have their own nationwide and secure radio network. The planning of the network began in the early 1990s, when analog authority networks were deemed to be expensive to keep up and the demands for authority communications had grown. In 1995 the Finnish government decided to invest €134 million for a new shared authority network. Construction of the network began in 1998 and the network became nationwide in 2002. Today there are over 60,000 users and about 1,300 base stations in the whole country.

== Technology ==
The technology for VIRVE has been developed by Nokia and the construction was overseen by the Ministry of Internal Affairs. The Terrestrial Trunked Radio-based system uses the frequency band of 380–400 megahertz, which is lower than GSM. Due to the lower frequency band fewer base stations are needed. Unlike its analog counterparts, Digital VIRVE is encrypted though it suffers the same backdoor security issue all Tetra have in common, and it has unified all previous authority networks into one network. The network makes it possible to transfer pictures and the same digital services as the GSM network. Furthermore, the network has a group call service that enables fast and efficient communication in a group of users. The expected number of clients in the network is 50,000. In July 2009 the number was 31,000. The power of the base stations is set to 25 watts, in vehicular devices it is 10 watts and in portable devices 0.5–3 watts.

The network is separated into groups that can be modified in according to the needs of the operation at hand. The network is used by security officials: the police, rescue services, customs, border guard, social- and health department and the Finnish Defence Forces. Authorities can also allow access to the network for other personnel separately for a limited amount of time, under contract or limited to certain events. VIRVE is controlled and upheld by Suomen Erillisverkot Oy (State Security Networks Ltd.), which is owned by the State of Finland in whole.

The current TETRA-based network will be replaced by 4G/5G-based network starting in 2022 and current TETRA-based network is estimated to be available until 2025. Procurement process has started in spring 2019.
