= Lake Kemijärvi =

Lake in Kemijärvi, Finland

Kemijärvi
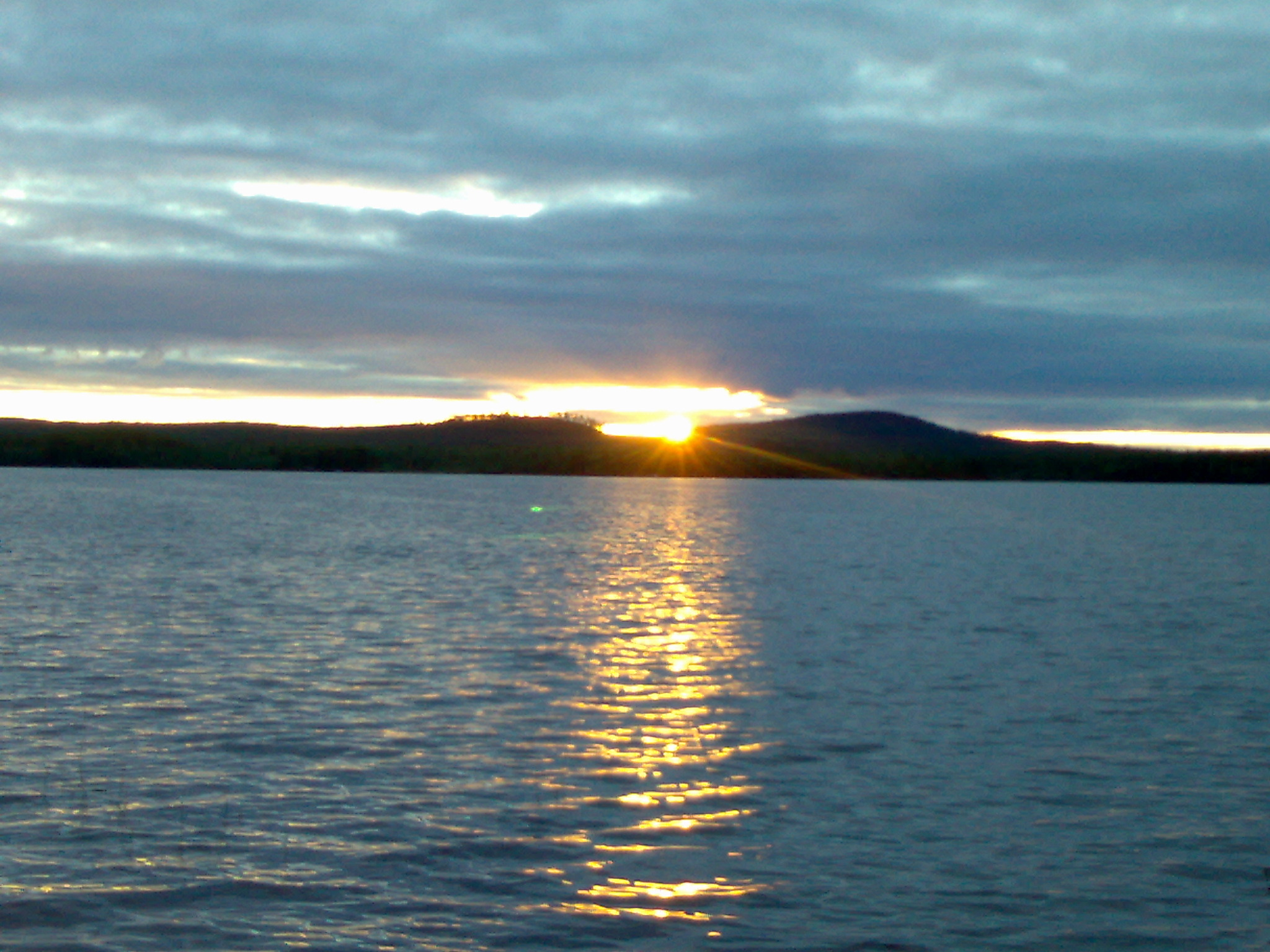
- Sunset on Kemijärvi.

- Location within Lapland

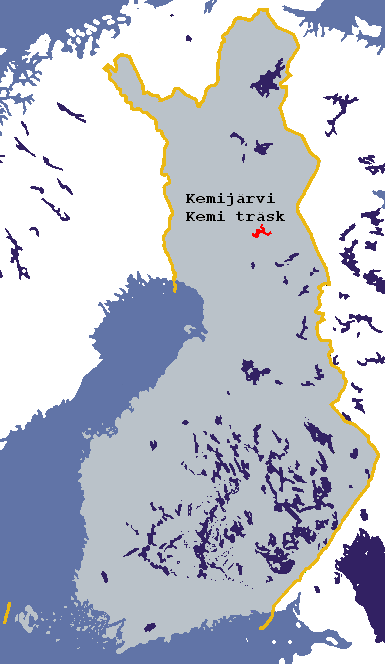
- Location: Kemijärvi, Lapland
- Coordinates: 66°38′N 27°34′E
- Primary inflows: Kemijoki
- Primary outflows: Kemijoki
- Basin countries: Finland
- Surface area: 230.91 km^{2} (89.15 sq mi)
- Surface elevation: 148.8 m (488 ft)
- Settlements: Kemijärvi

Kemijärvi (Swedish: Kemi träsk) is a lake in the town of Kemijärvi, northern Finland.
