= Silta =

Silta Силта СилтӀа
- Selo
- Location within Republic of Dagestan Location within Russia
- Coordinates: 42°23′N 47°04′E
- Country: Russia
- Region: Republic of Dagestan
- District: Gunibsky District
- Time zone: UTC+3:00

Silta (Russian: Силта; Avar: СилтӀа) is a rural locality (a selo) in Kudalinsky Selsoviet, Gunibsky District, Republic of Dagestan, Russia. The population was 257 as of 2010.

== Geography ==
Silta is located 18 km east of Gunib (the district's administrative centre) by road, on the Bardakuli River. Salta and Kudali are the nearest rural localities.
