= Destia =

Finnish infrastructure construction contractor

- Company type: Osakeyhtiö
- Industry: Roadworks
- Founded: 2008
- Headquarters: Helsinki, Finland
- Key people: Hannu Leinonen (President and CEO)
- Products: Road maintenance
- Revenue: ▲640.6 million € (2023)
- Operating income: ▲18.9 million € (2013)
- Owner: Colas
- Number of employees: 1,515 (2013)
- Website: www.destia.fi

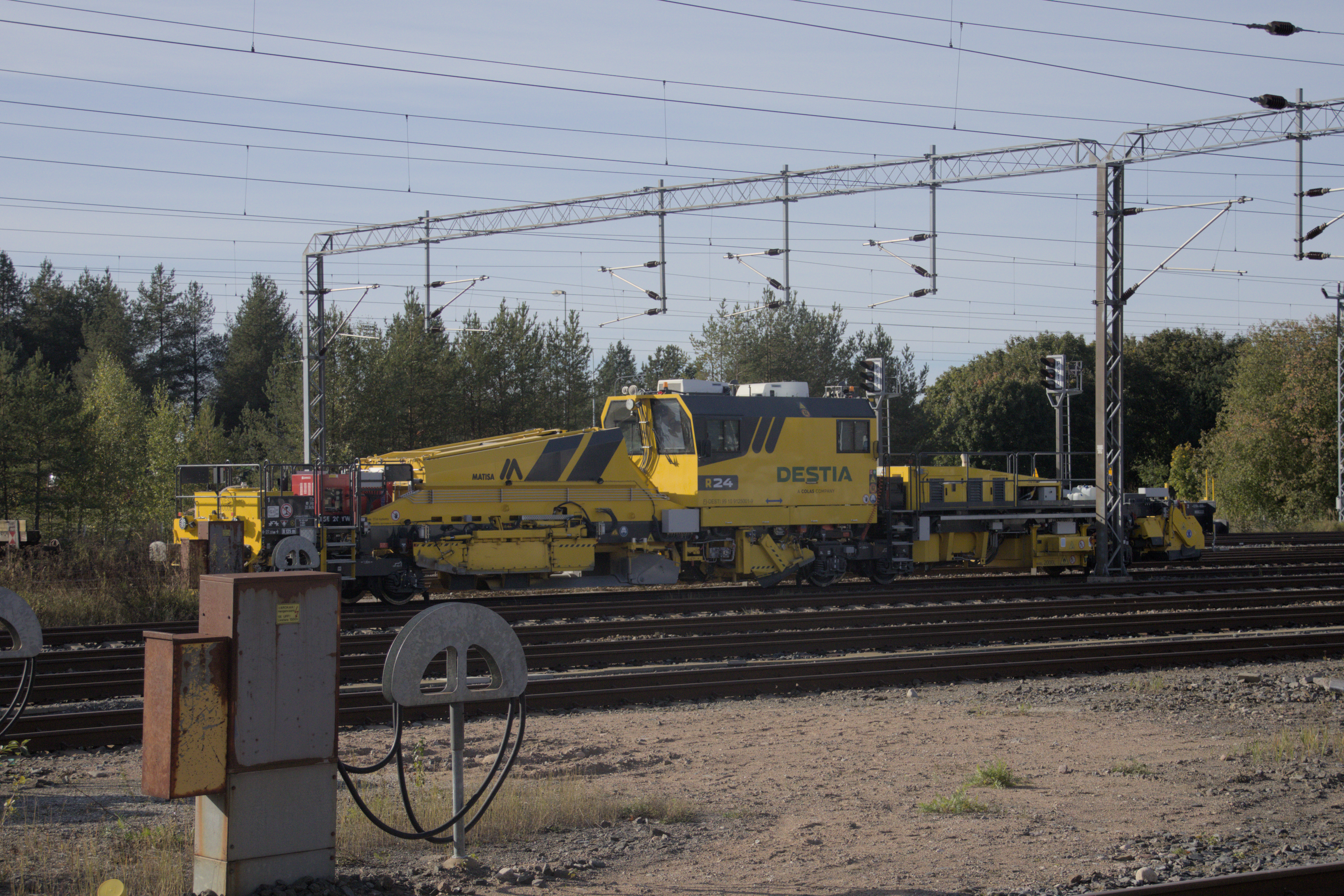
Destia ballast regulator

Destia Oy is a Finnish contractor of road maintenance, roadworks, railways and other infrastructure construction. It was formed from a former government agency Tieliikelaitos (a commercial government agency) in 2008. This commercial agency, in turn, was a separated in 2001 from Tielaitos, state agency for road maintenance. On May 26, 2014, it was announced that Finland's government has sold Destia to private equity firm Ahlström Capital for around 150 Million Euros. In August 2021 Ahlström Capital agreed to sell Destia to the French civil engineering firm Colas, part of the concern Bouygues.
