= Suomen Erillisverkot =

Finnish state-owned special mission company

- Type: Public
- Industry: Wireless network management and services
- Founded: 1999
- Headquarters: Tekniikantie 4 D, Espoo, Finland
- Services: Data center services, telecommunications services, and situational awareness services for authorities and critical infrastructure operators
- Revenue: €87.1 million (2022)
- Operating income: -€13.8 million (2022)
- Owner: Finnish government (Prime Minister's Office)
- Number of employees: 351
- Website: www.erillisverkot.fi

Suomen Erillisverkot is a wholly state-owned special mission company of Finland under the corporate governance of the Prime Minister's Office. It provides data center services, telecommunication services, and situational awareness services to authorities and critical infrastructure operators. Its services include the Virve public safety radio network, the Krivat which supports cooperation between critical control centres, and the Johtotieto which provides information on the location of cables and wires.

Suomen Erillisverkot serves Finnish Defense Forces, Police of Finland, the Fire and Rescue Services, the social and health care sector, the Emergency Response Centre Agency, the Finnish Border Guard, state and municipal actors, as well as critical infrastructure companies.

The CEO of Suomen Erillisverkot is Timo Lehtimäki.
