= Patria Pasi =

Pasi (Sisu/Patria XA series)
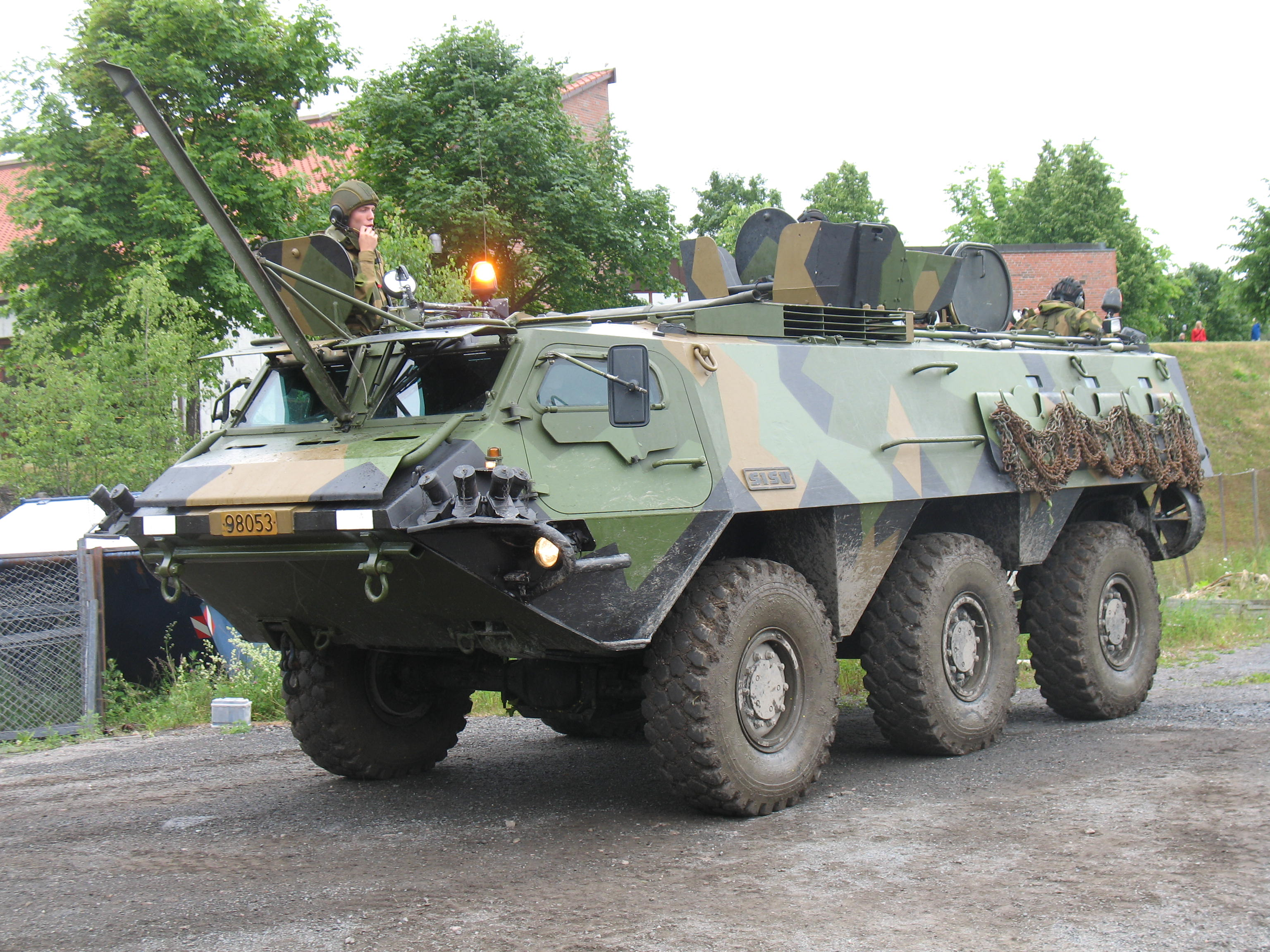
- A Norwegian XA-185
- Type: 6×6 amphibious armoured personnel carrier
- Place of origin: Finland

Service history
- In service: 1984–present
- Wars: Mali War; Russo-Ukrainian war War in Afghanistan (2001–2021)

Production history
- Designer: Sisu-Auto
- Manufacturer: Sisu-Auto (1984–1997); Patria (1997–2003)
- Produced: 1984–2003
- No. built: 1,300 (estimate)

Specifications (XA-180)
- Mass: 13.5 tonnes (13.3 long tons; 14.9 short tons)
- Length: 7.35 m (24.1 ft)
- Width: 2.9 m (9 ft 6 in)
- Height: 2.77 m (9 ft 1 in)
- Crew: 2 (+16 passengers)
- Armor: 6–12 mm
- Main armament: 12.7 mm NSV or M2 browning machine gun
- Engine: XA-180: Valmet 611 DSBJA diesel XA-200: Valmet 612 DWIBIC (EURO 2), 6 in-line cylinders, turbo-charged, intercooled diesel XA-180: 236 hp (176 kW); XA-200; 271 hp (202 kW) at 2100 rpm, max torque 1080 Nm at 1600 rpm
- Power/weight: 17.48 hp/tonne
- Suspension: Parabolic leaf-springs with hydraulic shock absorbers
- Operational range: 850 km
- Maximum speed: ~105 km/h on land 9 km/h in water (XA-180/185)

The Patria Pasi (earlier known as the Sisu Pasi) is a Finnish-made six-wheeled armoured personnel carrier (APC) originally designed for Finnish Defence Forces. The first variant was produced in 1983, and serial production began in 1984. It was designed to operate with ease of use, simple structure and low-cost maintenance. The basic appearance and configuration of the Pasi are similar to most other wheeled APCs. The XA-180 and XA-185 are fully amphibious, while other variants are not.

== Development ==
In 1980, Sisu produced an XA-180 prototype for Finnish Army tests. It competed against two other prototypes and was declared the winner of the trials in 1983. In December 1983, the Finnish Army ordered a first batch of fifty XA-180s. Nine were reserved for UN duties. The vehicle proved quite successful, and more orders followed.

The vehicle's widely known nickname "Pasi", also a common given name of Finnish men, stems from the Finnish designation "panssari-Sisu" (English: armoured Sisu). The main superstructure is mainly manufactured from 6 to 12 mm of armoured steel. The bottom is mine-strengthened. The front windows are bullet-resistant and equipped with protective hatches. The vehicle has continuous six-wheel drive and good capabilities for off-road driving. It can take inclines up to a maximum of 60°.

The Pasi has no standard armament, but is equipped with a rotating turret structure for eventual installations of light/heavy machine guns or autocannons. It has 8 BMP-style firing ports on the sides and rear. Therefore, passengers, usually a squad of infantry, can fire their weapons from the cover of the armor.

The Pasi is popular in peacekeeping missions due to its mobility, non-aggressive appearance, and good protection against mines and improvised explosive devices (IED). The vehicle offers a good combination of armament, comfort, mine protection, protection against shrapnel and small-calibre fire, road speed, short time of learning how to drive, and an acceptable terrain mobility. It offers more internal space compared to other similar APCs like the Fuchs or the BTR-80.

The early variants of the Pasi (such as the XA-180 and XA-185) were manufactured by Sisu Auto until 1997, when its defense subsidiary Sisu Defence Oy was acquired by Patria. The later variants (such as the XA-202 and XA-203) were then manufactured by Patria until 2003, when the then new Patria AMV entered serial production. By then, over 1,300 Pasis had been produced.

== Operational service ==
The Pasi has seen service in several conflict areas, including Afghanistan, Bosnia, Croatia, Eritrea, Golan Heights, Iraq, Kosovo, Lebanon, Macedonia, Namibia, Liberia, Somalia and Chad.

The Pasi has been used by the Finnish police in sieges and SWAT operations.

In 2008, Finland deployed two Sisu Pasi as part of the response to the 2008 Kauhajoki school shooting.

In 2018, Estonia deployed five XA-188s to Mali as part of Estonia's contribution to Operation Barkhane.

In 2022, Finland reportedly donated an unknown number of XA-180/185s to Ukraine as part of a military and humanitarian aid package following the escalations of the ongoing Russo-Ukrainian war. At least 27 have been lost in combat.

== Versions ==
Sisu XA-180
Original six-wheeler, carries crew of 2 and 16 troops. Empty weight ca. 12 tonnes.
Sisu XA-185
Upgraded version, carries crew of 2 and 18 troops. Has a more powerful engine and improved power transmission. Used as an ambulance in the Norwegian Army.
Patria XA-186
Upgraded armour. Armoured and equipped with machine-assisted gun turret (.50 BMG). Cannot swim because of the heavy armour. Empty weight ca 19 tonnes. Engine and transmission same as XA-185.
Patria XA-188
Used by the Royal Netherlands Army.
Patria XA-202/203
The 200 series looks a little different from earlier variants due to increased armour. It lacks amphibious capabilities but can wade through water that is up to 1.5 m deep. The improved armour protects the passengers against up to 14.5 mm small-arms fire. It is equipped with modern optical aids like periscopes and night vision. The armor upgrade was initiated after the realisation that the previous armor was inadequate, even modern armor-piercing 7.62 mm ammunition could pierce the older XA-180 and XA-185 models in certain areas. The XA-202 was originally developed for Communications and Command. The XA-203 variant was made as a temporary replacement for the earliest XA-185s.

In addition to standard variants, there are numerous sub-versions for specific missions, e.g. ambulance, command & communications, electronic warfare, air defence, radar surveillance, firefighting and anti-tank variants among others.

== Operators ==
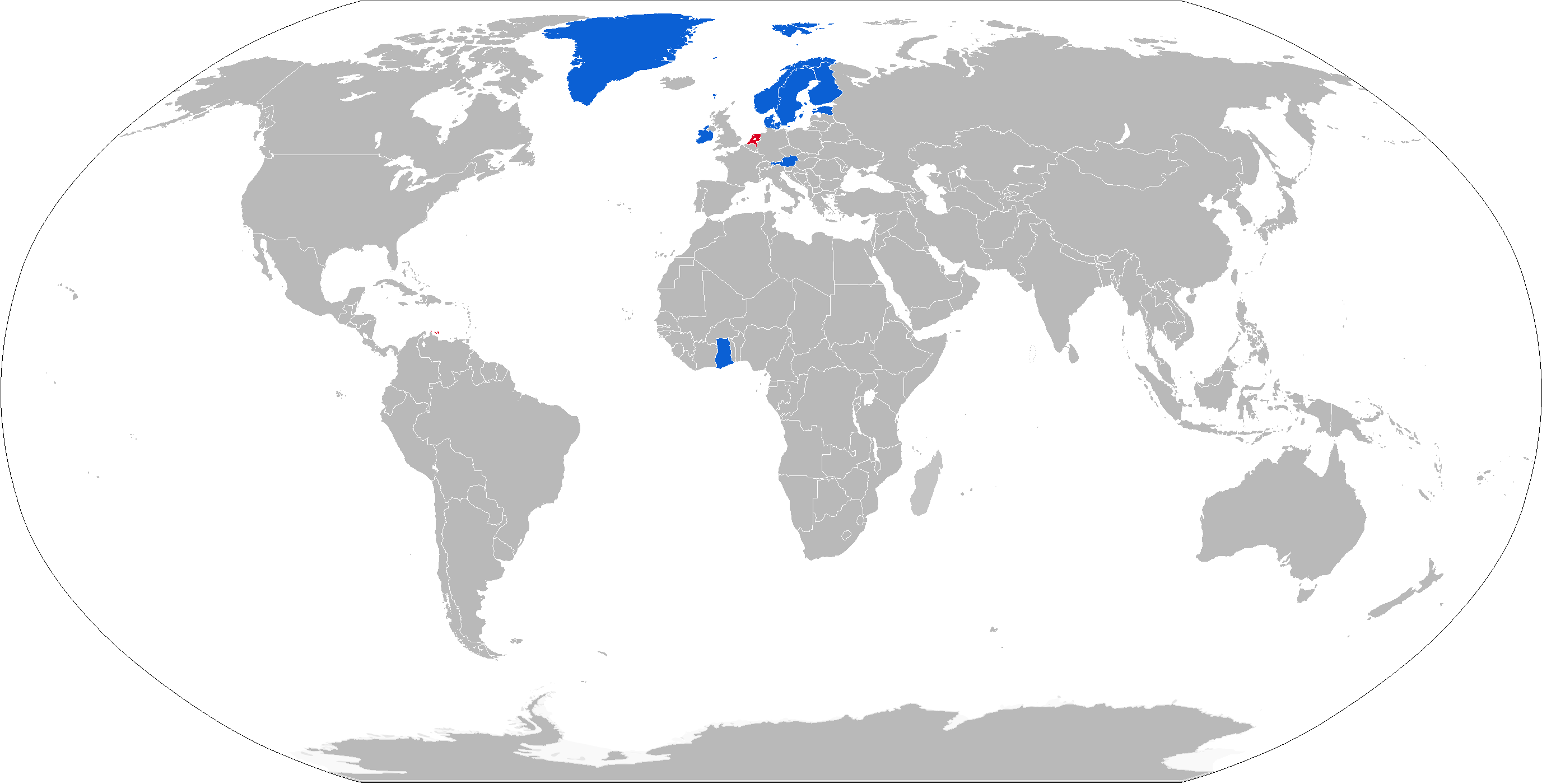
A map of Pasi operators in blue, with former operators in red

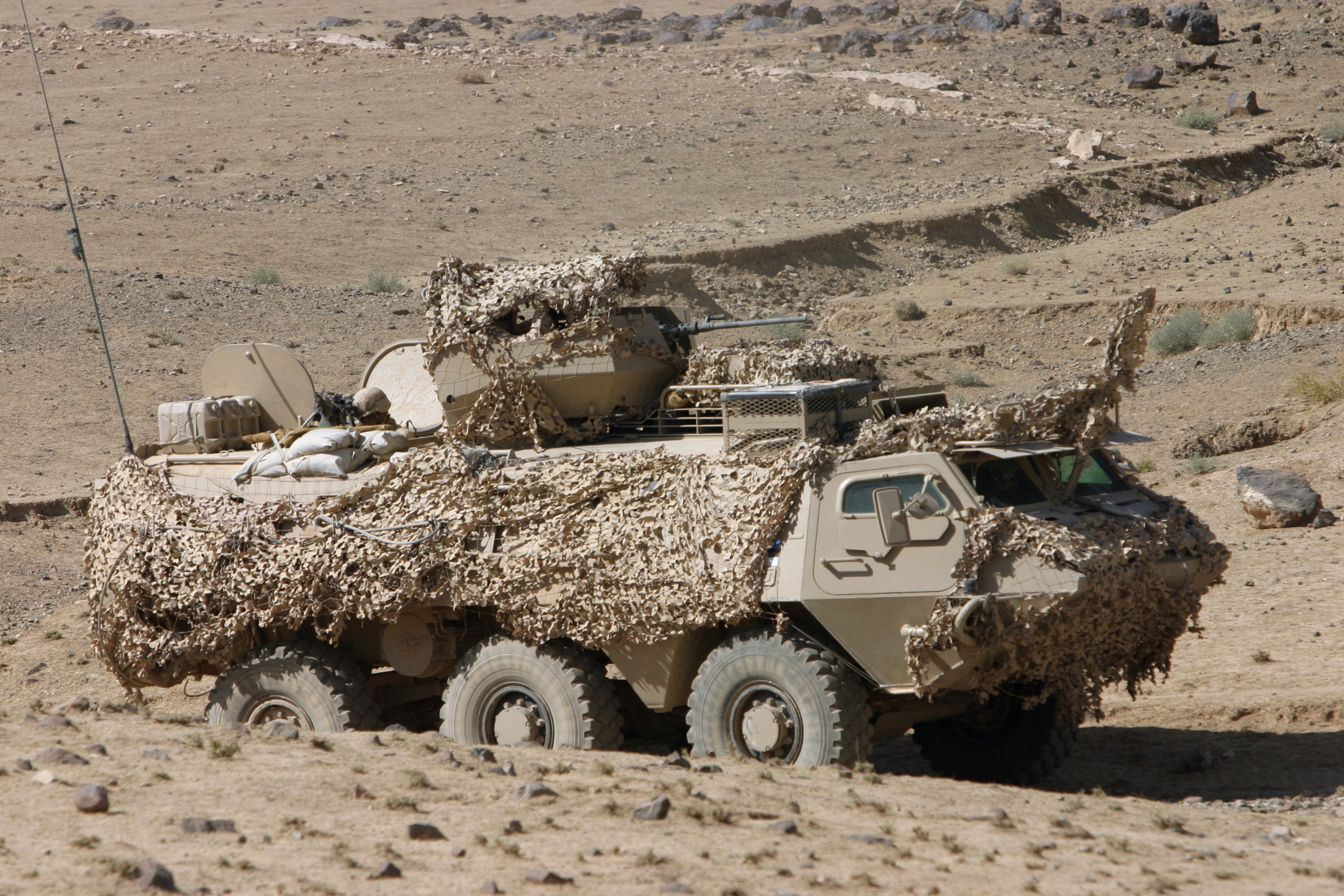
An Estonian XA-180 in Afghanistan

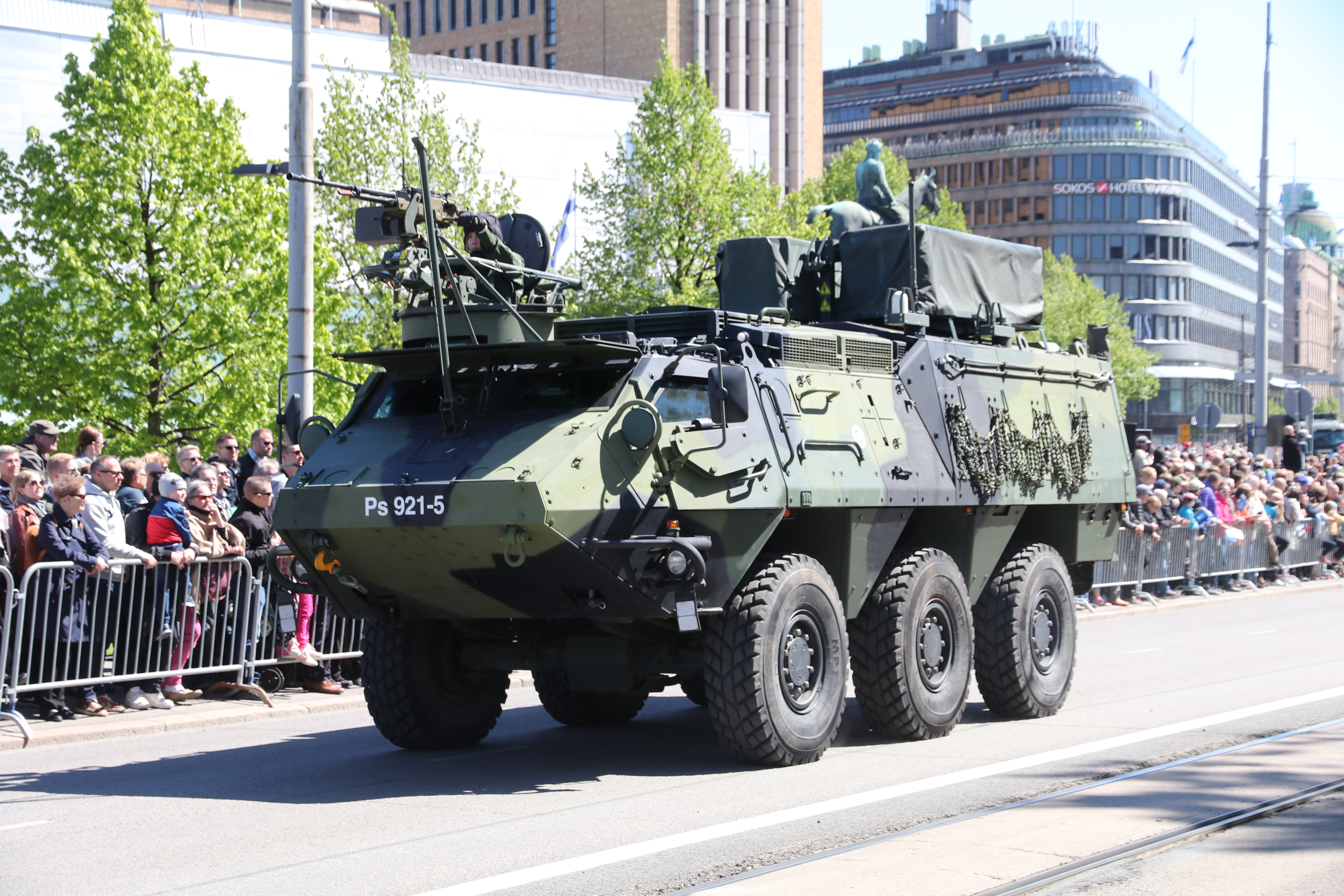
A Finnish XA-202

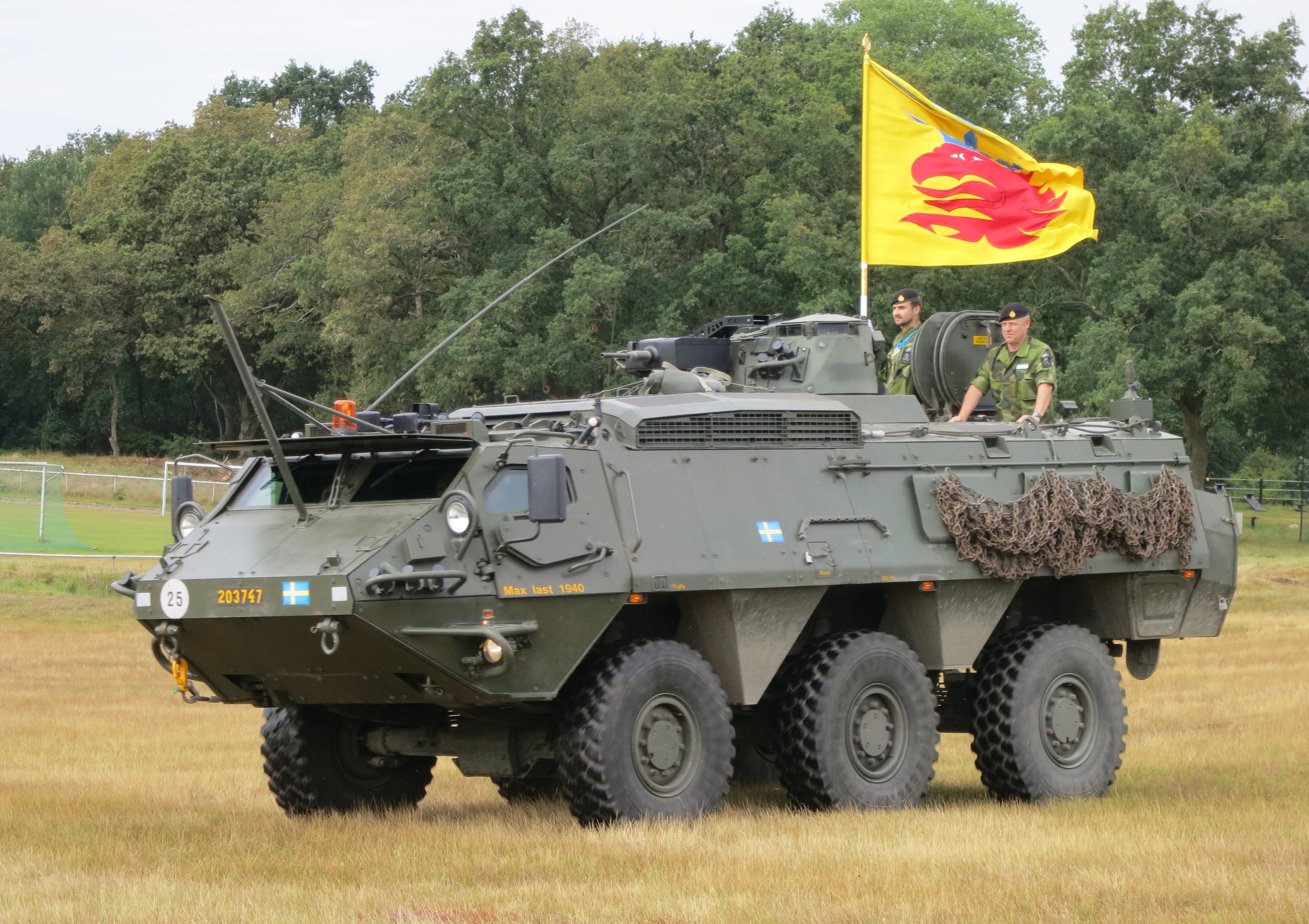
A Swedish XA-203 of South Scanian Regiment (P 7), Scania, Sweden

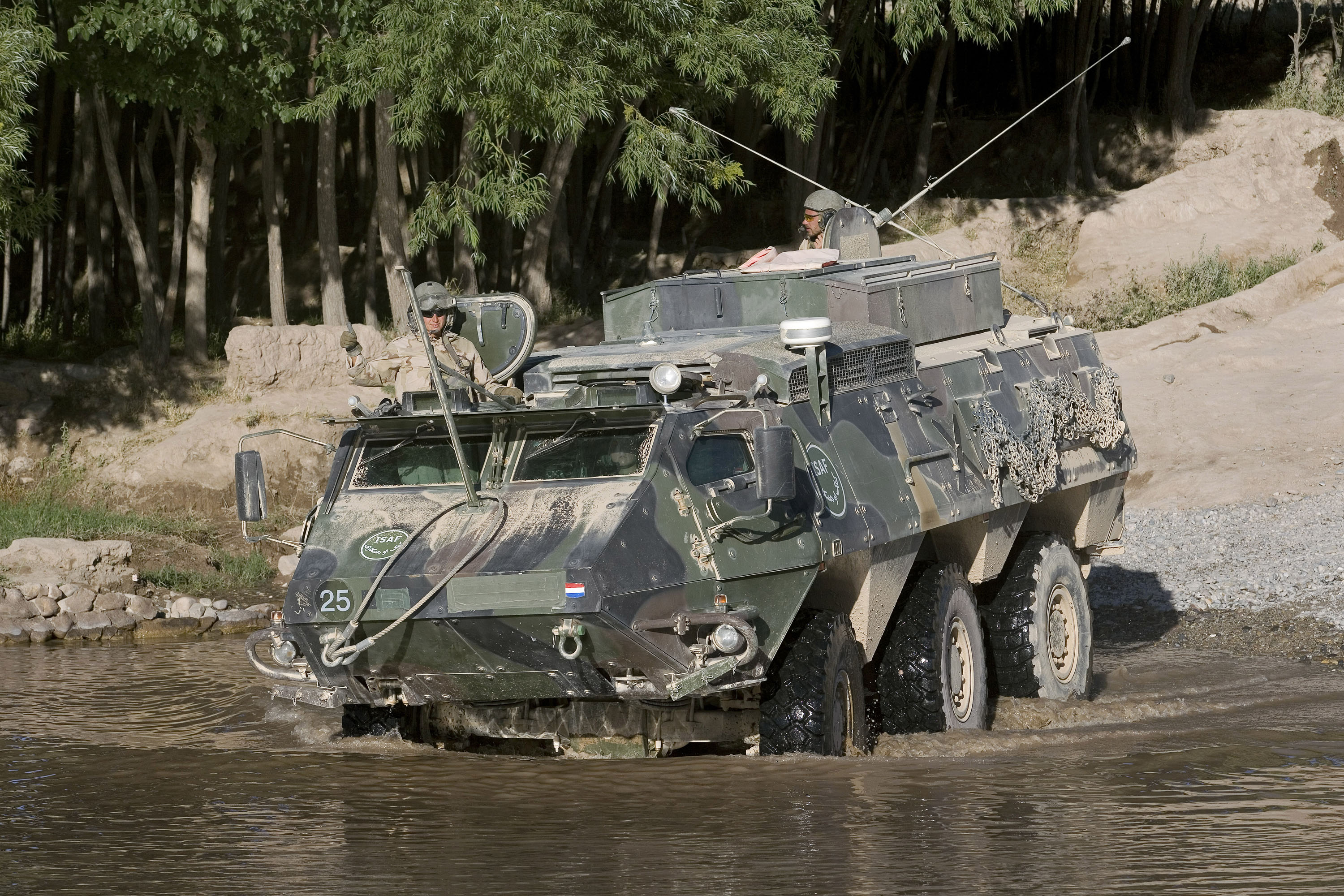
A Dutch XA-188 in Afghanistan

There are five original customers of the Pasi: Estonia, Finland, the Netherlands, Norway, and Sweden, while a large number have been leased to other military forces of the world.

=== Current operators ===
- Estonia: Estonian Army
  - XA-180EST, modernized variant of the XA-180
  - In 2010, Estonia purchased an additional 81 units of XA-188 from the Netherlands.
- Finland: Finnish Army, Finnish Navy, Finnish Air Force, Finnish Police. 425 XA-180s and 185s, 148 XA-200s
  - XA-180, most upgraded to 185 specs, and configured with special communications equipment
  - XA-181 built for Crotale NG independent air defence unit
  - XA-182, equipped with Jantronic J-1000/Giraffe Mk IV radar
  - XA-185, the most common version, most of the Finnish vehicles are armed with a 12.7 mm NSV machine gun. One prototype equipped with the BGM-71 TOW anti-tank missile system.
  - XA-202 command and signals vehicle, configured with special communications equipment

Also the following versions exist:

  - VIPA (ViestiPasi, communication vehicle using the YVI-2, Yhtymän Viestijärjestelmä, "brigade and corps level communication system")
      - ELSO (ELektroninen SOdankäynti, ELINT, electronic warfare) sub-version of VIPA.
    - EPA (EsikuntaPAsi, brigade command post vehicle)
    - KOPA (KOmentoPAsi, battalion command post vehicle)
    - SUTI (SUojeluTIedustelu), NBC reconnaissance vehicle
    - TUPA (TUlenjohtoPAsi, fire observer and artillery command post vehicle)
  - XA-203, the last generation APC replacing the oldest vehicles of the XA-185 series, except for regular APCs and ambulances,
    - Ambulance
  - Units used by the Finnish police are on loan from the Finnish military to police special unit and used in extreme situations.
- Norway: Norwegian Army. 75 vehicles.
  - XA-185, in service with several units primarily in the ambulance configuration. Phased out around 2020. 18 wagons donated to Ukraine in 2025.
  - XA-186, in service with the HMKG and Basesett 1 located at Ørland Main Air Station. In 1994–1996, 22 wagons of the XA-186 model were manufactured in Norway. Of these, 18 were crew cars, two control cars, one ambulance and one repair vehicle. Norway was the sole operator of the XA-186 worldwide, until 6 wagons were donated to Ukraine in 2025.
  - XA-203N, formerly in service with the 2nd Battalion. 30 vehicles converted to MRSP (ambulance configuration) after 2017, expected to be in use until at least 2040s.
- Russia: Russian Armed Forces. 1 captured from Ukrainian Army
- Sweden: Swedish Army. ~200 vehicles in total.
  - Pansarterrängbil XA-180/XA-185, XA-180(/185) armed with 12,7x99mm HMG. 70 vehicles delivered from 1988, mainly in UN service.
  - Pansarterrängbil 202, XA-202S as command and control vehicles, Swedish special variant
  - Pansarterrängbil 203A, XA-203 equipped with the turret from Pansarbandvagn 302 APC's, armed with a 20 mm gun, in 7 configurations like ambulance (unarmed), AT-missile, CBRN-detection, field repairs and so forth.
  - Pansarterrängbil 203B, the turret is replaced with the weapon-station Protector Nordic.
- Ukraine: Ukrainian Army. Unknown number of vehicles donated during the Russo-Ukrainian war. As of June 2026 it has been visually confirmed that 20 units have been destroyed, 5 abandoned and 2 captured by Russian forces.
- UN: A large number of Sisu XA-180 vehicles are used by UNIFIL forces in southern Lebanon.

=== Former operators ===
- Austria: Austrian Army, in UNDOF service.
- Denmark: The Danish Army leased eleven XA-185s, including ambulance versions, for use with UN troops, 4 were used in Bosnia, 4 in Kosovo, 3 for training purpose in Denmark.
- Ghana: In UN service.
- Ireland: The Irish Army had two XA-180s, formerly as training vehicles for soldiers preparing for service in South Lebanon. Retired in 2012.
- Netherlands: The Dutch Army and Netherlands Marine Corps purchased 90 XA-188s, 81 of which were later sold to Estonia.
  - XA-188 GVV (early 200-series variant) Used by army and marines, equipped with GPS and satcom, armament MG or .50cal
  - XA-188 GWT Ambulance

== Gallery ==
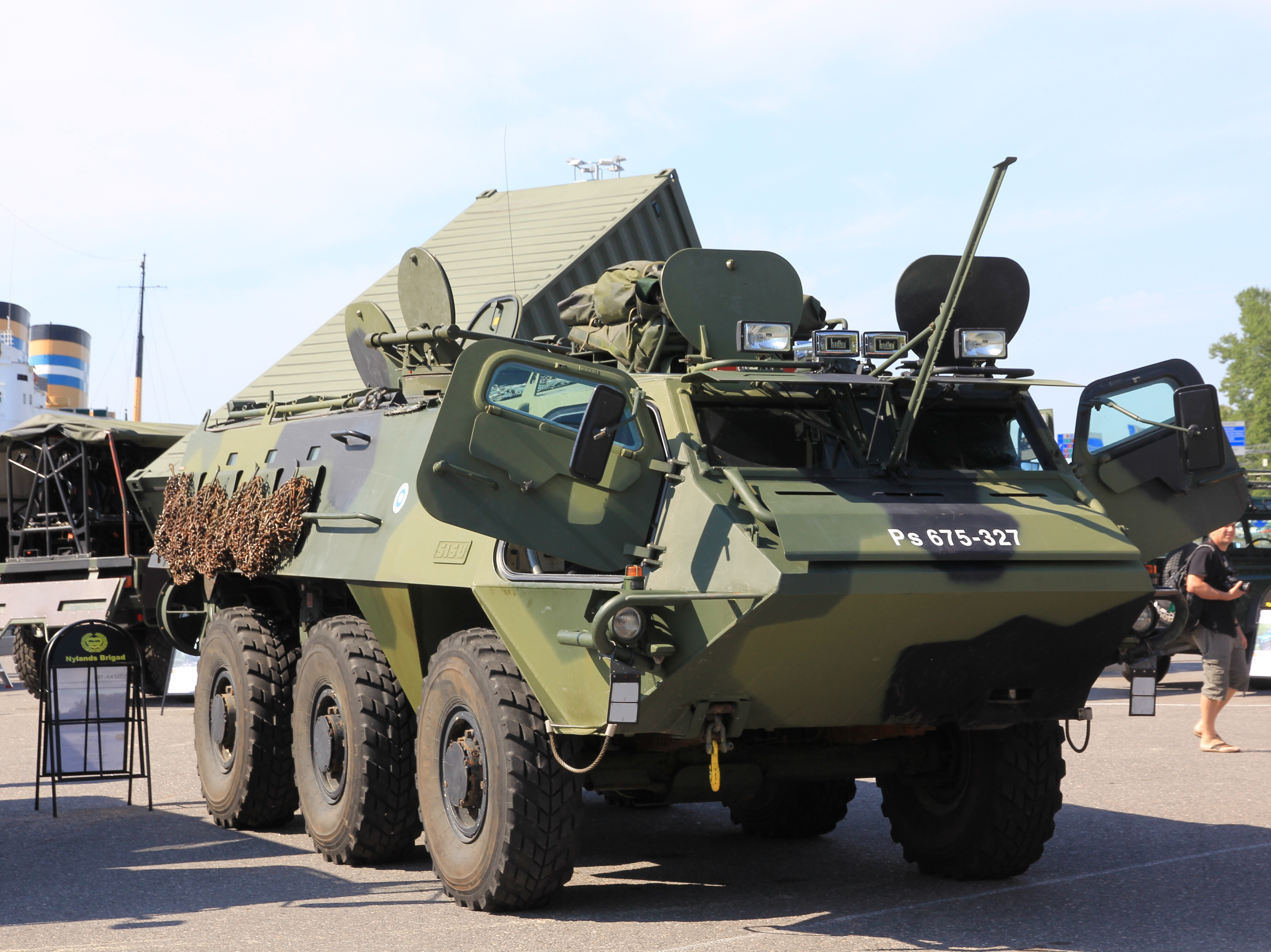
A Finnish Army XA-180

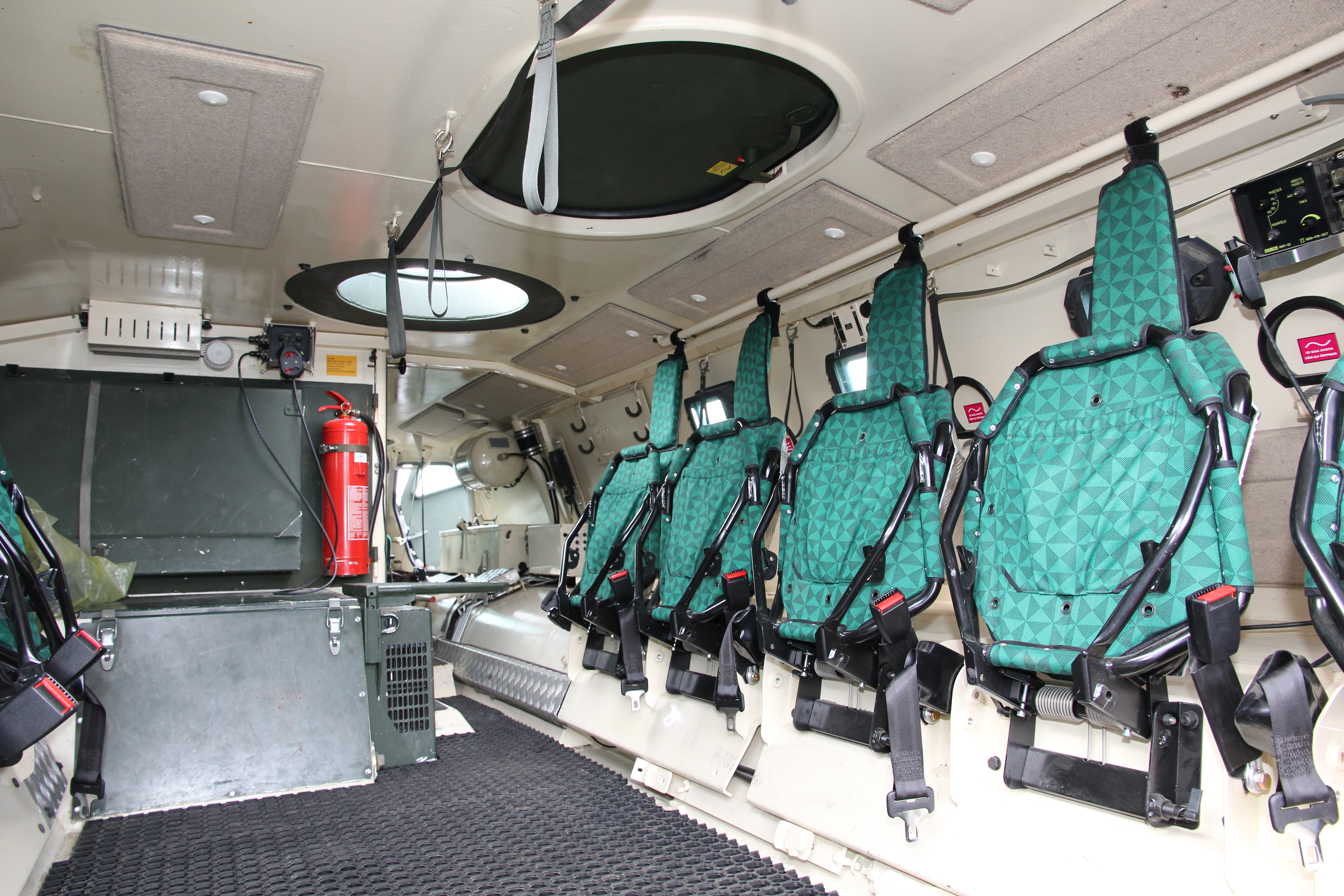
The interior of a Finnish Army XA-180M

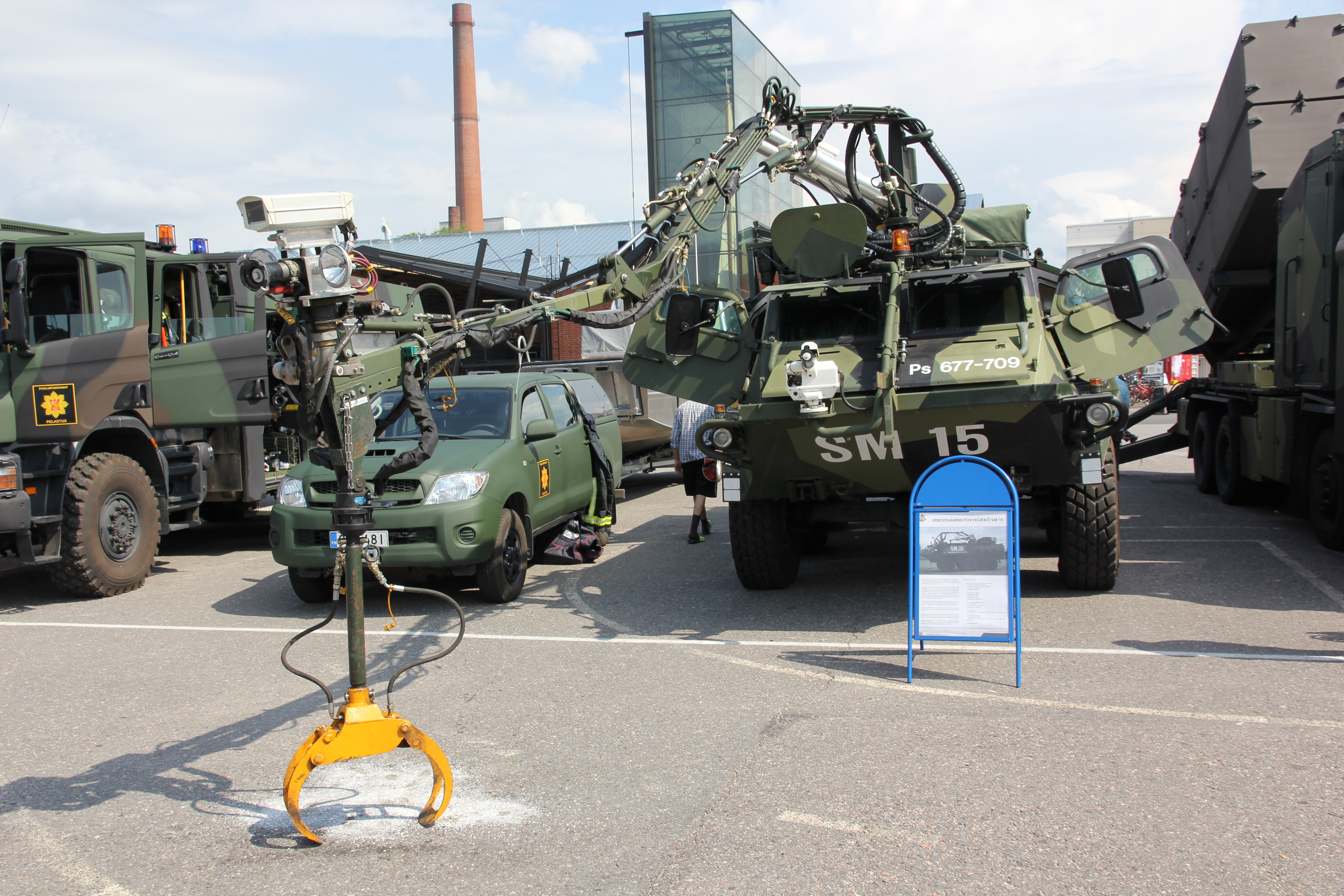
A firefighting variant used by the Finnish Defence Forces

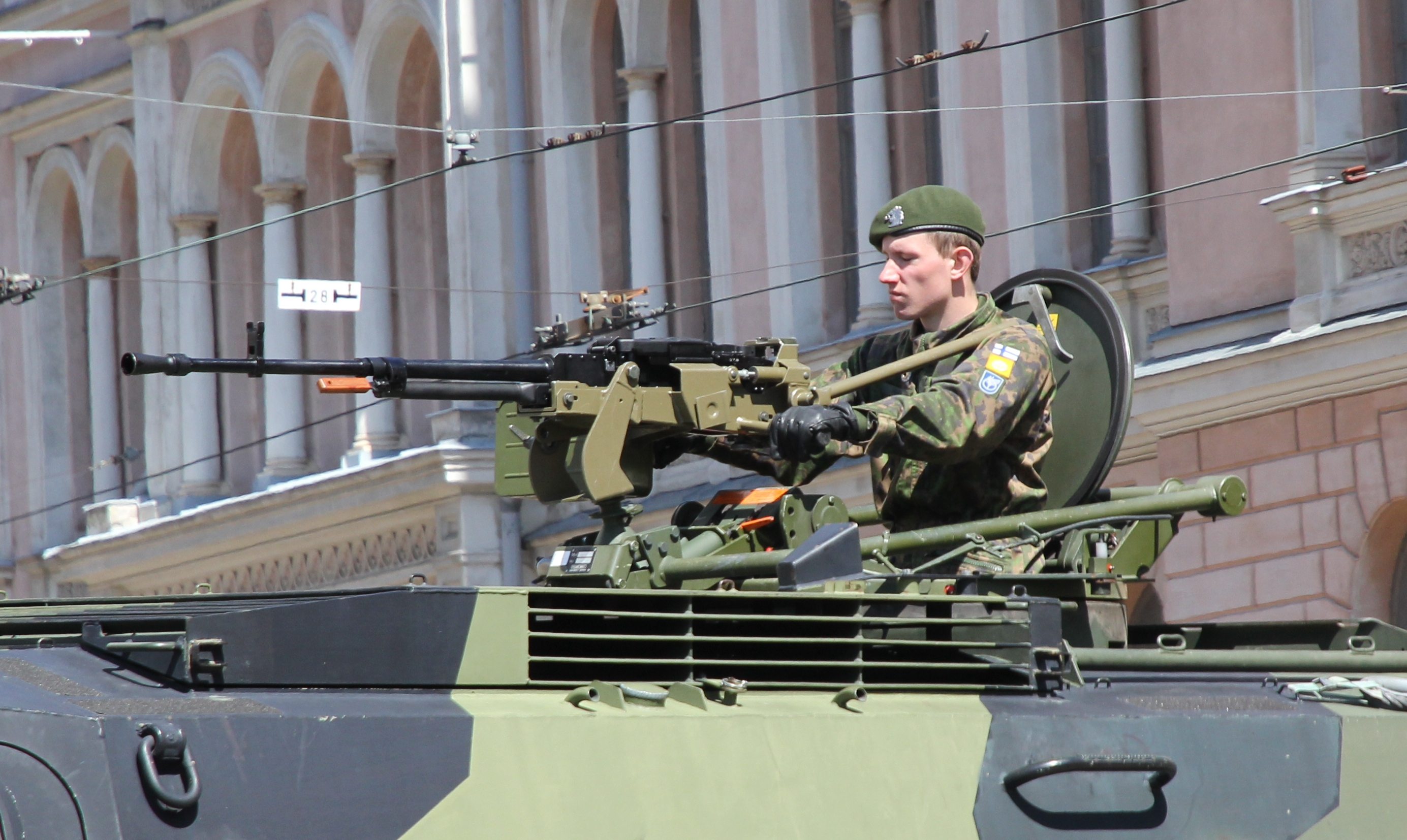
A Finnish Army XA-185 equipped with a 12.7 mm NSV machine gun

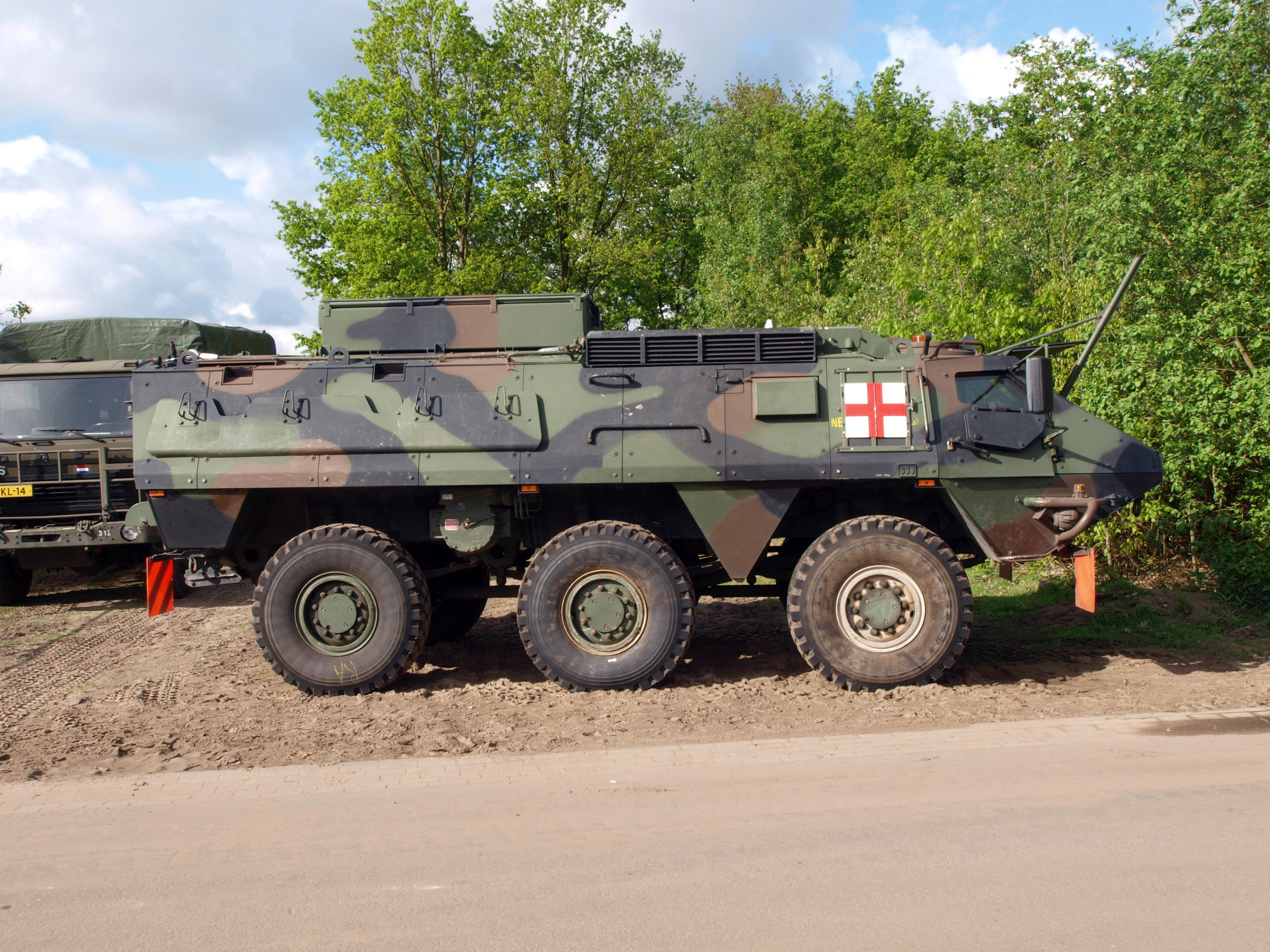
A Royal Netherlands Army XA-188 ambulance transport vehicle

== See also ==
- Patria Pasi variants
- Patria AMV – (Finland)
- Patria 6×6 – (Finland)
- Véhicule de l'Avant Blindé – (France)
- WZ-551 – (China)
- TPz Fuchs – (West Germany)
- List of AFVs
