= Licentia =

Licentia may refer to:

- Licentia, Latin name for a licentiate degree
- SS Ryazan (1944), cargo ship launched as Licentia
