= Defense industry of Finland =

The defense industry of Finland is a strategically important sector and major supplier of the Finnish Defence Forces. According to a survey by the state-owned investment company, Finnish Industry Investment Ltd, Finland's defense industry has in recent years seen strong growth.

== History ==
=== 1919-1939 ===
In 1919, SAKO was established in a former Helsinki brewery to repair private arms and recondition Russian military rifles for Finnish service. The rifle repair shop became financially independent of the civil guard in 1921. The Suojeluskuntain Yliesikunnan Asepaja moved from Helsinki to an ammunition factory in Riihimäki on 1 June 1927, and reorganized as SAKO in the 1930s. Sako started exporting pistol cartridges to Sweden in the 1930s and continued manufacturing submachine gun cartridges.

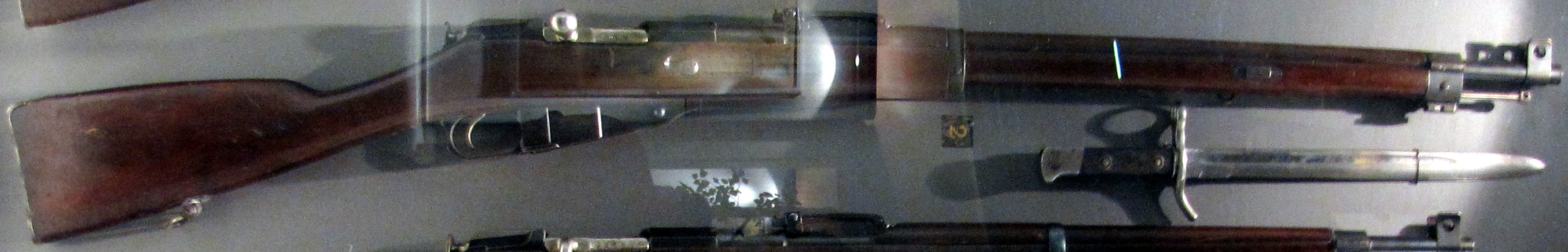
Finnish Army Model 27

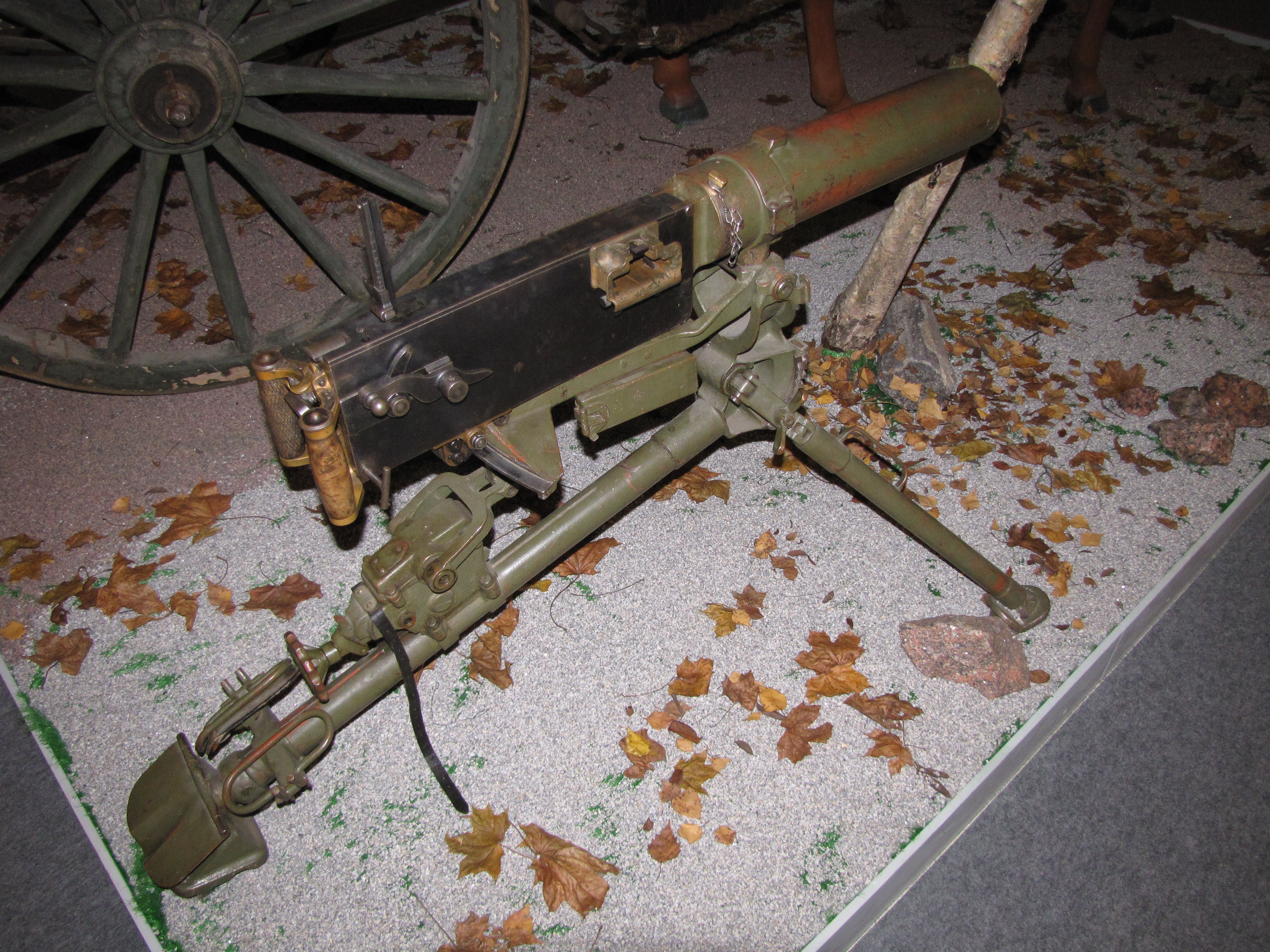
Maxim M/09-21 machine gun

Tikka was one of the first major Finnish arms manufacturers, and produced the M27 rifle, a rebuild of the Mosin-Nagant for the Finnish Army in 1927, up until 1940. In 1930, the company was purchased by a German armsdealer Willi Daugs and the next year the production of the Suomi KP/-31 submachine gun was started. After 1933, Tikka also produced machine gun ammo belts and the Maxim M/09-21.

Patria was established in 1921. Operations began with licensed manufacturing of the German Hansa-Brandenburg aircraft, with the total production volume between 1922 and 1926 amounting to 120 aircraft.

Sisu Auto was established under the name Oy Suomen Autoteollisuus Ab (SAT) in 1931 as a coachbuilding business, but also put into practice the plan of building own vehicles.

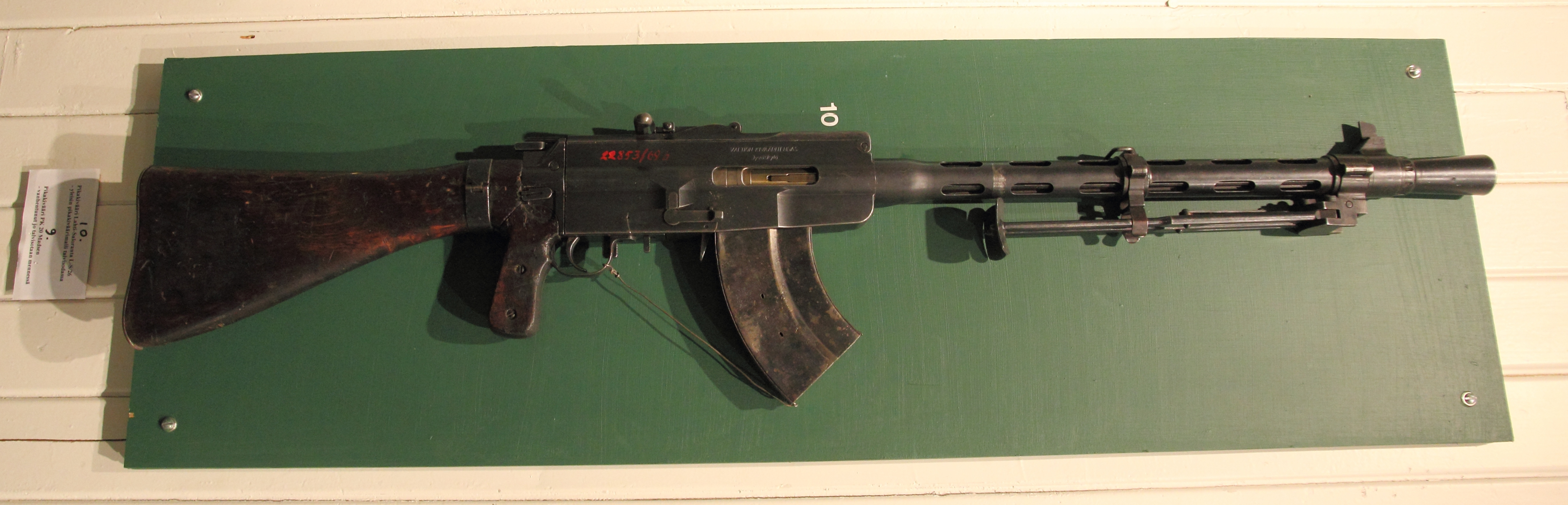
Lahti-Saloranta M/26

Valtion Kivääritehdas (VKT) was a state-owned firearm manufacturer founded in 1926. The first serial product in the factory was the Lahti-Saloranta M/26 light machine gun.

=== 1939-1945 ===
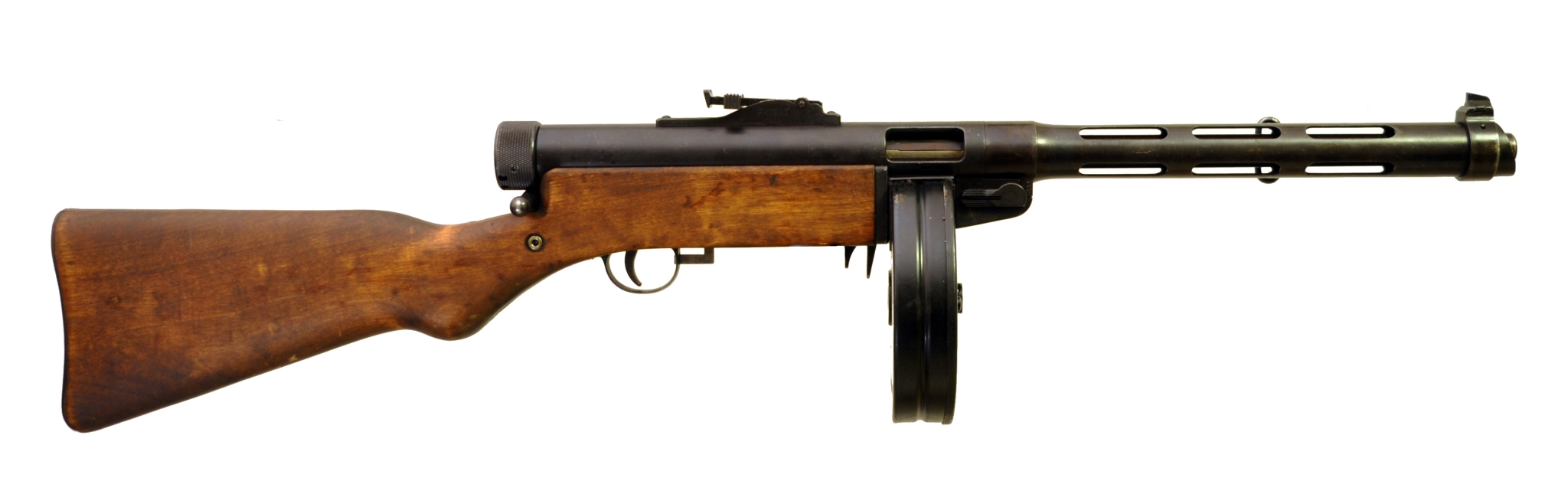
Suomi KP/-31

When the Winter War broke out, as a strategically important company SAT went under military administration. A part of the production was moved to Järvenpää and Lahti. The company produced for example aerial bombs and transportation devices for them.

SAT started own engine production in 1940 under Hercules licence. This together with tram building and 1942 started axle production led to lack of space in the factory area. The first plans of moving some of the production out from Helsinki were made already before the war. The plan was put into practice due to the war which made the factory located in the capital vulnerable to Soviet air raids. In 1942 the construction of new premises began in Karis, which was out but sufficiently reachable from Helsinki. Coach- and cabin building was transferred first, after which the tram production followed; building of lorries stayed exclusively in Helsinki until 1950.

At the same time when SAT built the new factory in Karis, the Finnish Defence Forces reported needing thousands of vehicles in the near future. SAT suggested building the factory larger in order to meet the demand. However, the importers of other makes as well as some politicians suspected that SAT tried to use the war to gain a dominant position in the Finnish market. Eventually, an agreement was reached in 1943 when SAT, the state and a number of Finnish companies set up a separate company, Yhteissisu to produce lorries. SAT and Yhteissisu signed a contract about transferring Sisu S-21 lorry production to Yhteissisu. Vanaja municipality next to Hämeenlinna was selected for the factory location.

The war was over before Yhteissisu could start serial production at the full scale. Yhteissisu had the right to use the Sisu-brand until June 1948. When this expired, the company was renamed Vanajan Autotehdas (VAT) and its products were named Vanaja. VAT became a strong competitor to SAT in the Finnish market which was small but still protected by import restrictions.

Also during World War II, Tikka manufactured the Suomi KP/-31 submachine, machine guns, and gun barrels. They also produced .50 Browning and 20×138mmB Solothurn Long ammunition. At the same time, VKT production was decentralized to Seppälänkangas depot and SOK-owned factories in Vaajakoski.

=== 1945-1991 ===
After the war in 1946, VKT was consolidated into the government-owned Valtion metallitehtaat conglomerate that became Valmet in 1951 and the unit was named just Tourula factory. The factory still produced sport and hunting rifles, but the main focus shifted to building industrial machines and tractors. Finally, Valmet's Tourula factory was merged with SAKO to form Sako-Valmet Oy in 1986. Production in Tourula ended in the late 1990s.

The scope of production for SAT remained diverse until the 1950s partly due to war reparation industry. SAT produced parts for Finnish paper machine builders and other engineering companies.

Tikka was considered to be a German-owned company and its assets were confiscated for the Soviet Union in 1947, discontinuing firearms production. Finnish businessmen however bought the company from the Soviets in 1957.

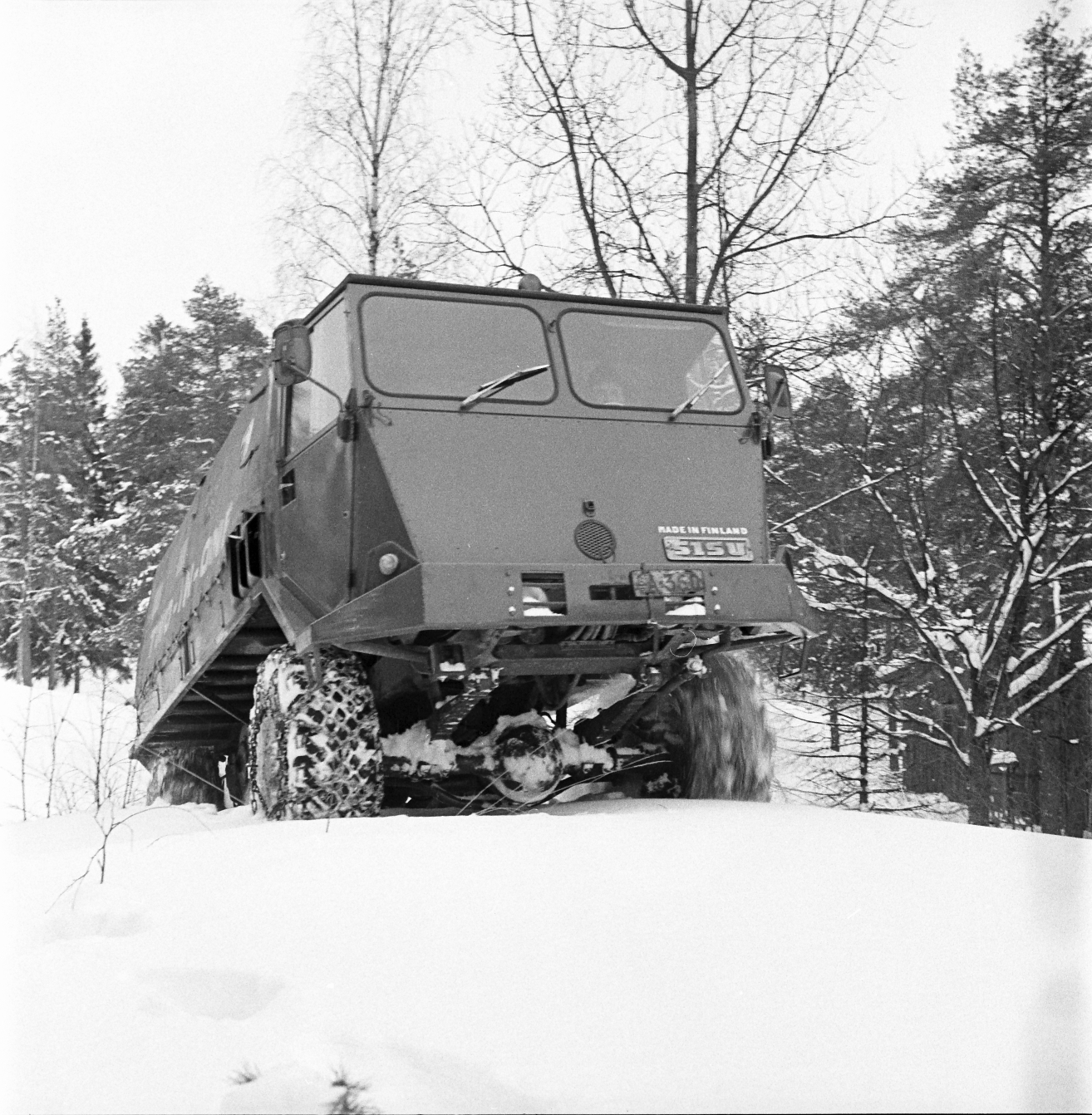
Sisu KB-45

In 1958 the Finnish Defence Forces arranged a thorough test trial comparing SAT lorries of different producers; these tests gave the Sisu K-26, modified from a civil model, a good rating. In 1959 SAT introduced Kärppä-Sisu K-35 for military use but 4×2-driven. Production of military off-road vehicles started in 1964 when SAT presented KB-45, a new light 4×4 lorry. The military vehicle production was moved from Karis to Hämeenlinna when the upgraded A-45 was presented. Medium heavy SA-150 and heavy 6×6-driven SA-240 production followed after. SA-110 was a light lorry prototype which was only produced six units.

The best known SAT military vehicle is the armoured personnel carrier Pasi in different variants. The production of the first model, XA-180 was started in 1984 after thoroughgoing testing. Pasis have been commonly used in UN peacekeeping missions.

Tikka was merged into SAKO in 1983 to form Oy Sako-Tikka Ab. Later, Tikka was omitted from the company name but SAKO continues to use the Tikka brand for a series of rifles, mostly the T3X model. SAKO's merger with Valmet to form Sako-Valmet in 1986 led to the closure of Tikka's arms division in 1987.

=== 1991-present ===
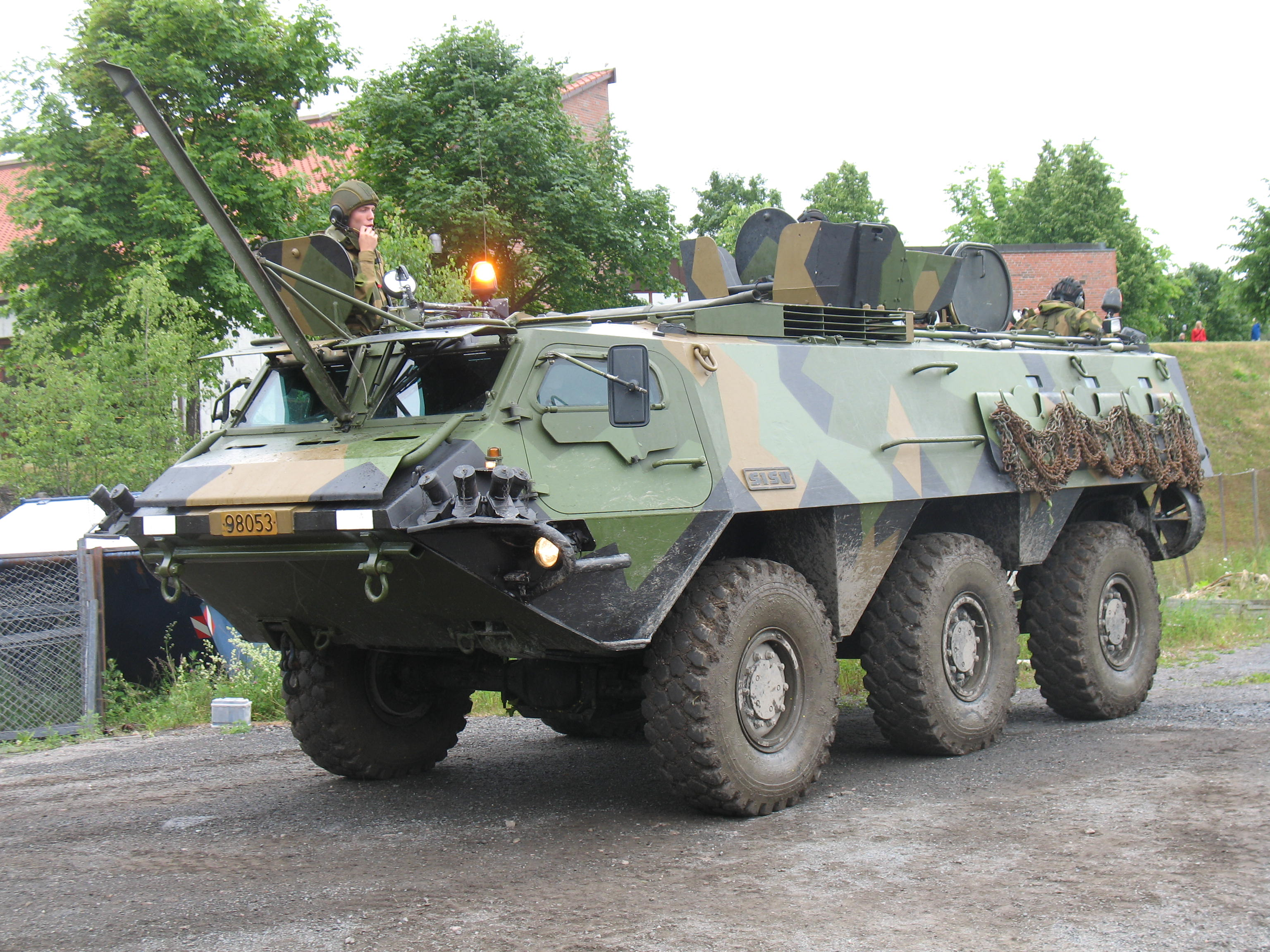
Sisu XA

In 1994 SAT broke up, and the new company was named Sisu Auto, and the subsidiary Sisu Defence was founded. In 1990 the demining vehicle RA-140 was introduced by SAT and they were produced a small series starting from 1994 by Sisu Defence. The last Sisu-produced variant is XA-186, the later models have been produced by Patria when Sisu Defence was sold to the state. The last Pasis were produced in 2005.

Sisu Auto introduced a new series of military designated lorries based on Sisu E-series in 1997, using components supplied by Renault. This series consisted of 6×6- and 8×8-driven vehicles. This led to the re-establishment of Sisu Defence in 2005 as a part of Sisu Auto. A notable milestone was a contract of armoured Sisu E13TP 8×8 vehicles to the Lithuanian Armed Forces. A series of new light lorries Sisu A2045 was produced in 2009–2010 to replace the aged KB-45 and A-45 models.

During 2001, Patria had secured contracts to build several elements of the NHIndustries NH90 helicopter, such as the rear fuselage, rear ramp, sponsons and sliding doors; the firm also signed Memorandum of understanding to perform final assembly of both the helicopter and its engines. In March 2008, deliveries of Finland's NH90 commenced; deliveries had been delayed from an initial 2004 date thus, to minimize further delay, helicopters were first delivered to an Initial Operational Configuration (IOC-) and Nearly Operational Configuration (IOC+), to be later modified by Patria into a Final Operational Configuration (FOC). In September 2011, the Finnish Defence Forces and Patria signed an agreement to provide ballistic protection for onboard personnel across the NH90 fleet. On 18 June 2015, delivery of the final Finnish NH90 took place.

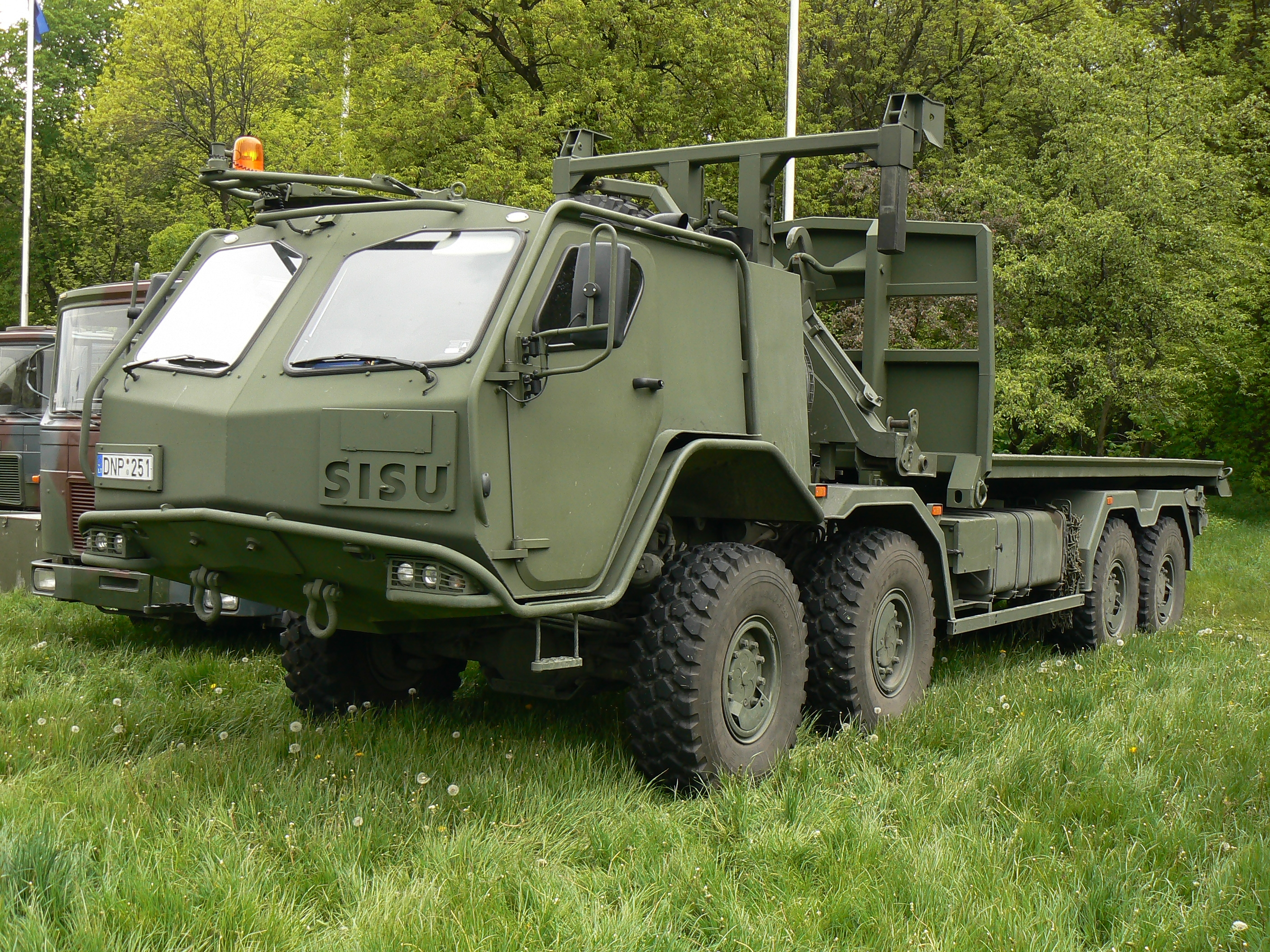
Sisu E13TP

The first armoured 8×8-driven Sisu E13TP military vehicles were produced in 2008 by Sisu. Between 2009 and 2012 the Sisu production was operated by contract manufacturer Komas.

During March 2016, it was announced that Norwegian defense group Kongsberg Defense & Aerospace AS had agreed terms to purchase a 49.9% stake in Patria; Walter Qvam, Kongsberg chief executive, stated that the company was keen to leverage new advantages from the deal, including Patria's 50 per cent ownership in Norwegian ammunition manufacturer Nammo. The transaction placed a total value of 283.5 million euros on Patria.

Patria provides support and maintenance, repair, and operations (MRO) services for various aircraft. During 2009, it won a contract to modernise the Finnish Air Force's 49 BAE Systems Hawk 51/51As with CMC Electronics's Cockpit 4000 avionics suite; months later, Patria was awarded a second contract to upgrade the avionics of 18 Finnish Hawk 66s. Furthermore, it has made offers to supply and support Hawks for foreign operators, including a bid for the Polish Air Force in 2011. In March 2014, the company partnered with Swiss aerospace company RUAG to offer MRO services to McDonnell Douglas F/A-18 Hornet operators worldwide.

== Domestically produced equipment ==
=== Firearms ===
- Sako S20, a modular "hybrid" rifle with aluminium bedding chassis and interchangeable furnitures (buttstock/grip and fore-end)
- Sako 85, a Sako's premium-line bolt-action centerfire hunting rifle, available in many configurations and calibres from .204 Ruger through to .416 RM
- Sako A7, a Sako's mid-price-range hunting rifle, filling the gap between the Sako 85 premium line and the Tikka T3x value line hunting rifles. The A7 combines different features from the Sako 85 and the Tikka T3, along with a unique in-line detachable magazine design, and is currently (2010) available only with a synthetic stock, in combination with either a blued chromoly or stainless steel barrelled action.
- Sako TRG, a long-range sniper rifle geared toward law enforcement and military use
- Sako Quad, a rimfire rifle, available in a variety of configurations with interchangeable barrels in .17 HMR, .17 HM2, .22 LR and .22 WMR calibres
- Sako Finnfire II, a rimfire rifle available in .17 HMR and .22 LR calibres
- Sako ARG, a family of AR-15-style rifles for military and law enforcement.
- Tikka T3x, a Sako's budget-range centerfire hunting rifle, available in calibres from .204 Ruger to .338 WM
- Tikka T1x MTR, a "multi-task rimfire" rifle with the same receiver footprint as the T3x, introduced in 2018, available in .17 HMR and .22 LR calibres

=== Vehicles ===
==== Armored vehicles ====
- Patria 6×6 (Patria XA-300), a 6×6 multi-role armoured fighting vehicle. The variants include:
  - APC, an armoured personnel carrier
  - HAPC, a heavy armoured personnel carrier with a remote controlled turret with small or medium calibres and anti-tank guided missiles
  - CAVS NEMO, a mortar carrier
  - Command vehicle
  - Medical evacuation
- Patria AMV, a 8×8 multi-role armoured fighting vehicle.
  - APC, an armoured personnel carrier
- Patria AMX^{XP}, a 8×8 multi-role armoured fighting vehicle
  - Standard height:
    - IFV, an infantry fighting vehicle
    - APC, an armoured personnel carrier
    - Anti-tank vehicle
    - Reconnaissance vehicle
    - Armoured repair and recovery vehicle
    - Fires-support (105 / 120 mm guns)
    - Mortar carrier
    - Ambulance
  - High roof:
    - Command (C4I)
    - Ambulance
    - Workshop vehicle
- Patria TRACKX APC, a tracked armoured personnel carrier with a crew of 2 and seat for up to 10 dismounts
- Sisu GTP, a four-wheeled, modular mine-resistant ambush protected armoured personnel carrier.

==== Tracked articulated vehicles ====
- Sisu Nasu, a tracked articulated, all-terrain transport vehicle. The variants include:
  - NA-122, A version that carries a 120 mm mortar 120 KRH 92 and 14 rounds on its tail unit. Called Krh-TeKa in Finnish Army service.

=== Indirect fire ===
==== Artillery ====
- Patria 155 GH52 field gun.
- Patria ARVE, a self-propelled howitzer, using the Patria 155 GH52 field gun on a SISU E13TP truck
- 155 K 83, a towed 155 mm field gun.

==== Mortar systems ====
- Patria AMOS, a twin 120mm barrel mortar turret
- Patria NEMO, a single 120mm barrel mortar turret The variants include:
  - Patria NEMO turret for vehicles (CAVS NEMO, Patria AMV, BAE AMPV, GTK Boxer)
  - Patria NEMO container
  - Patria NEMO Navy, a turret for naval vessels (Swedish variant, UAE variant)
- Patria TREMOS (Traditional REborn Mortar System), a light 81 or 120mm mortar system. This system is suitable for 4x4, 6x6, 8x8 and light tracked vehicles
- 81 KRH 71 Y, a light mortar.
- 120 Krh/40, a 120 mm mortar.

=== Aircraft ===
- Assembly and maintenance center of the P&W F135, the engine of the F-35A
- Production of 400 F-35A front fuselages
- Production of F-35A landing gear door sets
- Patria Aerostructures provides design and production of composite parts for some aircraft:
  - NHIndustries NH90

=== Unmanned Systems ===
- Patria ONE, modular FPV drone, with different types of payloads, and radio or fibre optics guidance
- Patria SKY, long-range multi-purpose quadcopter drones
- Patria GEO, a terrain-mapping drone

=== Naval systems ===
==== Coastal artillery ====
- 130 53 TK, a fixed, heavy artillery piece.

==== Sea mine systems ====
- Patria SONAC ACS, an underwater minesweeping robot
- Patria SONAC DTS, a dual towed sonar system for anti-submarine operations
- Patria SIGMA, underwater measurement systems that capture the signature of vessels passing by (magnetic, electric, pressure and acoustic signals)
- Patria SIGMA Light, a smaller variant of the SIGMA that can be deployed with smaller boats, but with a shorter signals tracking capacity.
- Sea Mine 2000, a naval mine

=== Electronic systems ===
==== Radar ====
- Patria MUSCL, a passive radar

==== Electronic intelligence ====
- Patria ARIS, an ELINT system analysing the signal environment
- Patria ARIS-E, an ESM system that intercepts, recognises, geolocates and tracks radar platforms
- Patria CRAWLR, an open source intelligence and analytics tool for cyber intelligence

==== Communication systems ====
- Patria CANDL, Compact Airborne Networking Data Link (data link solution for communications requiring high reliability, such as UAS payload data and C2). It enables MUM-T operations, and is used by the Airbus SIRTAP.

===== Data systems =====
- Patria TADS, Tactical Debriefing System
- Patria DOME, real-time situational awareness data

==== Training systems ====
- Patria AMV PTT, Part Task Trainer
- Patria SHIFTR, a simulator with training scenarios for a vehicle crew
- Patria NEMO Training Simulator
- Patria ASW Training Target
- Patria LVC, Live, Virtual and Constructive, a training system for fighter pilots

== Major manufacturers ==
Patria is one of Finland's biggest defense contractors. It manufactures armoured vehicles, artillery, mortar systems, aircraft parts, unmanned systems, naval systems, and various electronic systems. As part of the European Defence Industrial Development Programme (EDIDP), Patria was selected to lead a defence industry consortium developing future armoured platforms and upgrading existing ground combat capabilities in 2021. The consortium comprises 19 leading defence companies from different EU countries.

SAKO, Tampella, and Nammo are three other large defense contractors. SAKO manufactures firearms and ammunition; Tampella manufactures artillery, anti-tank guns, coastal artillery, and mortars; and Nammo manufactures missile parts and assembly, ammunition, hand grenades, warheads, and shoulder-fired systems.

Sisu Auto is a truck manufacturer, which has a subsidiary company, Sisu Defence, producing high mobility tactical vehicles for military use.
