= Valmet Sniper M86 =

Finnish sniper rifle

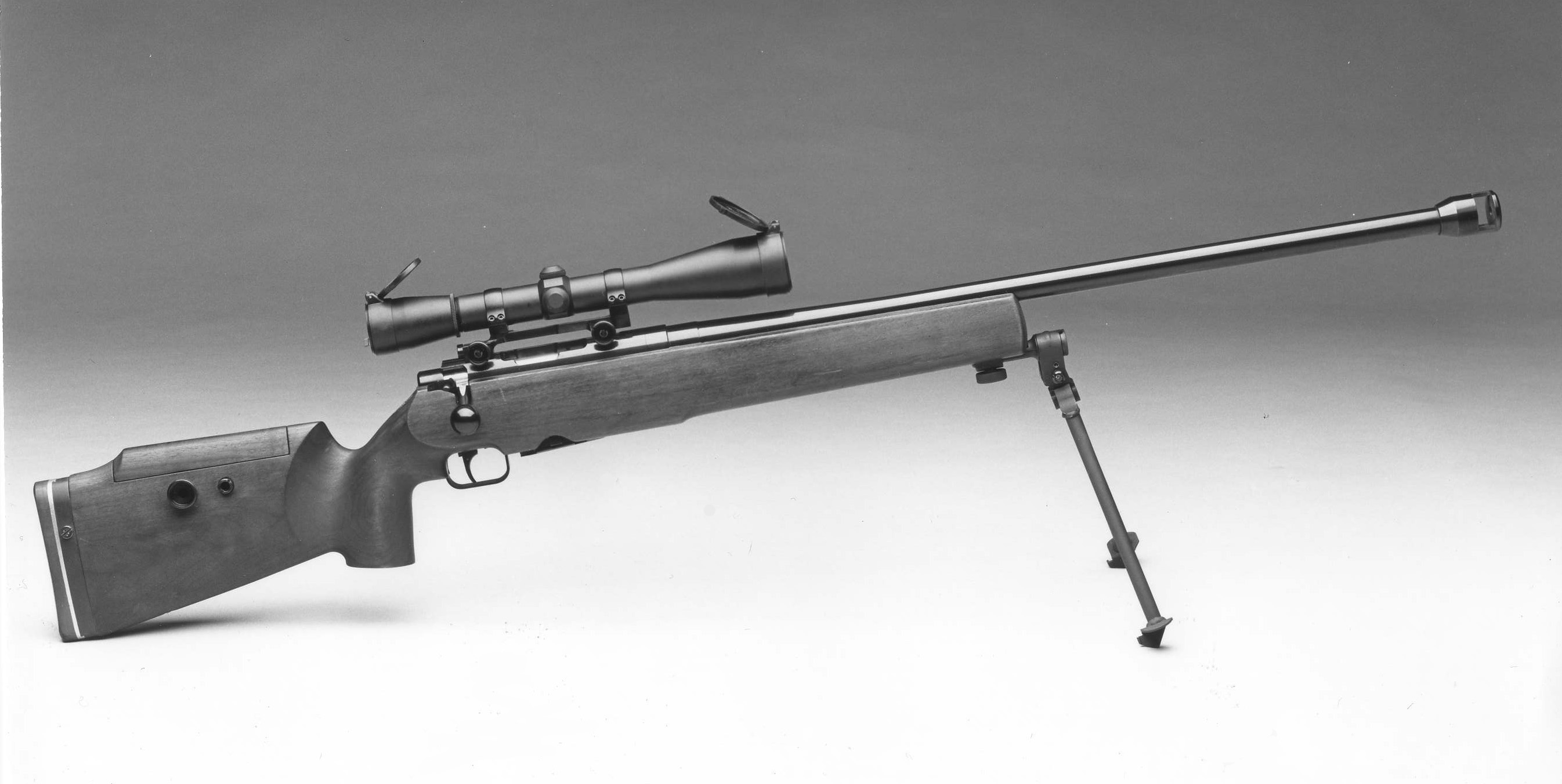
- Valmet Sniper M86
- Type: Sniper rifle
- Place of origin: Finland

Production history
- Designer: Valmet
- Designed: 1984-1986
- Manufacturer: Valmet
- Produced: 1987
- No. built: ~200
- Variants: Sniper rifle Target rifle Hunting rifle

Specifications
- Mass: 5.7 kg (without scope)
- Length: 1210 mm
- Barrel length: 720 mm
- Height: 170 mm
- Cartridge: .308 Winchester; 7.62×53mmR (prototype only)
- Action: Bolt action, 60° rotating bolt, three locking lugs
- Muzzle velocity: 760 m/s
- Effective firing range: 800 m
- Feed system: 5 or 9-round (.308 version); 20-round (7.62×53R version) detachable double stack box magazine
- Sights: Day or night optics, aperture sights for target shooting.

The Valmet Sniper M86 (also Valmet M86 Sniper and Valmet Sniper) is a Finnish sniper rifle designed by the former Finnish state firearms company Valmet. The rifle was Valmet's first and only proper sniper rifle, and after the merger with Sako in 1986, its development work was the basis for the Sako TRG sniper rifles. The rifle was produced only in small numbers in 1987 due to the merger.

== History ==
Valmet and the Finnish Defence Forces (FDF) had attempted to develop a semi-automatic sniper rifle, whose prototype name was Valmet TAK, during the 1970s on the basis of the Valmet RK 71 assault rifle. The prototypes however weren't satisfactory and the project was shelved as a failure, although Valmet incorporated some improvements developed from the experiences of the TAK project to their rifles. In the early 1980s the FDF was again looking for new sniper rifles in the FDF proprietary 7.62×53mmR cartridge, to replace the older Finnish M28 Mosin-Nagant based sniper rifles, whose latest model M28-76 was employed as a stopgap measure following the failure of the TAK. In 1982 FDF came to the conclusion that no commercial rifle in the Finnish market is suitable as a 7.62×53R military sniper rifle without distinct modifications to the action, and competing Finnish major firearms companies Sako and Tikkakoski (which was owned by Sako) weren't interested in developing a sniper rifle, especially not using the 7.62×53R cartridge. The tight production schedule laid out by the Finnish Defence Forces for the new sniper rifle programme led to them using once again the venerable Mosin-Nagant construction, albeit heavily modified, in the TKIV 85, which was assembled at Asevarikko 1 ('Arsenal 1') in Kuopio, with major input and parts production from Valmet.

Valmet started also designing a proper sniper rifle completely from scratch on their own, which was also recommended by a FDF HQ major Kari Aro. The initial setting was to produce a 7.62×53R sniper rifle; also .300 Winchester Magnum and other magnum options were planned to increase the effective range of the rifle, but since the initial aim was to produce a rifle which the FDF could use, the initial development was centered on the 7.62×53R. Creating a magazine for the 7.62×53R was problematic, and Valmet opted for using a modified Lahti-Saloranta M/26 magazine for the 7.62×53R version.

The trial rifle turned out very accurate, and a small batch was manufactured for the civilian market before the merger of Sako and Valmet. The produced rifles however didn't yet incorporate all of the features developed during the development, such as the multi-calibre rifle patent (Finnish patent No. 72807), which featured an aluminium bedding block (chassis) to which barrelled actions of different calibres could then be quickly changed. The produced rifle was meant to be a military sniper rifle in many of its features.

The idea for the multi-calibre rifle was later used by a small Finnish firearms company Pirkan Ase to develop their Lynx TD12 and TD15 rifles, as well as a modification to Sako 85. Sako also took up a similar design based on the patent No.72807 for production in their Sako M85 Exige.

== Design ==
The main design of the rifle features a forged receiver, to which a 60° rotating, three-lug bolt locks. The bolt face is big enough to use large rimmed cartridges such as 7.62×53mmR, and it can be disassembled without tools; at the rear of the bolt there is also a cocking indicator. The 720 mm cold hammer forged steel barrel is chambered to .308 Winchester with four rifling grooves and a twist rate of 270 mm (1:11"), and is threaded to the receiver. Complete length of the rifle is 1210 mm and height 170 mm without scope. Valmet guaranteed a 0.7 MOA accuracy for the rifle at 100 metres and 1.0 MOA at 500 metres.

The two-stage trigger mechanism is derived from Valmet Suomen Leijona target/competition rifles, and is adjustable between 0.7 and 2.0 kg (7 and 20 N) force. Both stages and trigger position are adjustable.

The production rifle had both wooden and fibreglass stocks available, with spacers to adjust length of pull, stock height and a fully adjustable cheek piece. The wooden or fibreglass stock attaches to an internal aluminium bedding block, which in turn attaches to the receiver, removing the need to use any specific bedding mass to bed the stock to the receiver. The cheek piece of the sniper variant is quickly adjustable, while the hunting variant has tool-adjustable screws. The stock has aluminium UIT rails on the underside and on the left side, to which a sling mount attaches; the hunting variant features lightening cuts on the front end of the stock. The magazine well is absent in the competition variant.

The magazine in the .308 production rifles is a 5 or 9 round double-stack staggered-feed box magazine. However, the competition variant doesn't feature a magazine.

A bipod with adjustable cant, traverse and tilt attaches to the ultimate front end of the stock, and folds to the underside of the stock when not in use.

The scope mount made by Valmet attaches to a dovetail section on the receiver.

The sniper version features a single chamber muzzle brake; this type of a muzzle brake was also tested on the TKIV 85 prototype rifles. The hunting version has a bare muzzle.

== Variants ==
- Valmet 7,62 Kiv 85: the 7.62×53mmR prototype version. Not to be mixed with the FDF 7.62 TKIV 85, whose production was also done partially by Valmet.
- Valmet Sniper M86: the production series.
  - Sniper rifle variant: the main planned military variant of the Valmet Sniper, of which only 25 were made. Included a muzzle brake.
  - Target rifle variant: a target rifle single-shot variant without a magazine. Only 5 were made.
  - Hunting rifle variant: a simplified hunting version of the sniper variant, of which around 200 pieces were made. Lightened stock, plain muzzle without a brake.

== See also ==
- 7.62 TKIV 85 - FDF sniper rifle whose development spurred the development of the Valmet Sniper M86.
- Sako TRG - successor of the Valmet Sniper M86.
- Accuracy International Arctic Warfare - contemporary development which also incorporated an aluminium bedding/chassis system.
