= Sako A7 =

Finnish rifle

- Type: Rifle
- Place of origin: Finland

Production history
- Designer: Sako
- Manufacturer: Sako
- Produced: 2008–

Specifications
- Mass: 2.9–4.2 kilograms (6.4–9.3 lb)
- Barrel length: 570, 600, 660 mm (22, 24, 26 in)
- Cartridge: S (short action): .22-250 Rem, .243 Win, 7 mm-08 Rem, .308 Win, .270 WSM, .300 WSM. M (long action): .25-06 Rem, .270 Win, .30-06 Springfield, 7 mm Rem Mag, .300 Win Mag.
- Action: Bolt action, 70° rotating bolt
- Sights: Receiver drilled and tapped for scope mount

Sako A7 is a bolt-action rifle made by Sako since 2008, and is meant to fill the gap between premium models such as Sako 85 and the cheaper Tikka T3 model made by the same company. Sako A7 has some technical similarities with both Sako 85 and Tikka T3, but also have some of its own unique design features. The receiver is available in the two action lengths short (denoted S by Sako) and medium/long (denoted M by Sako), and is drilled and tapped for mounting a scope rail or scope bases. The bolt has push feed, three locking lugs and a 70 degree bolt lift. The magazine is double-stack staggered-feed, and can be loaded from the top while it sits in the rifle. The magazine also has a locking lever which Sako calls Total Control Latch (TCL). The barrel is free floating, and the trigger is a single stage trigger with adjustable pull weight from 500 to 2000 grams. Sako A7 is delivered with either blued or stainless finish on the receiver and barrel, and was only available with a synthetic stock at its introduction.

== See also ==
- Tikka T3
- Sako 75
- Sako 85
- Sako TRG
- Sako S20
