= Sako M23 =

Finnish precision rifle

- Type: Designated marksman rifle Sniper rifle
- Place of origin: Finland

Service history
- Used by: See Users

Production history
- Designer: SAKO
- Designed: 2020–2023
- Manufacturer: SAKO
- Produced: 2022–
- Variants: 7.62 KIV 23; 7.62 TKIV 23

Specifications
- Mass: 3.9 kg (9 lb)
- Length: 880 to 965 mm (35 to 38 in)
- Barrel length: 406.2 mm (16 in)
- Cartridge: 7.62×51mm NATO
- Action: Gas-operated, rotating bolt
- Effective firing range: 600 m (656 yd) (KIV 23); 800 m (875 yd) (TKIV 23)
- Feed system: 10 or 20-round detachable polymer box magazine
- Sights: Iron or optical sights Trijicon VCOG 1–6×24 (KIV 23); Steiner M7Xi 2.9–20×50 (TKIV 23)

The Sako M23 (officially Kiväärijärjestelmä M23, 'Rifle system M23') is a Finnish family of military precision rifles designed by Sako in cooperation with the Finnish Defence Forces and the Swedish Armed Forces, manufactured by Sako. The M23 is a part of the larger Sako ARG rifle family.

== History ==
In May 2020, the Finnish Defence Forces announced that they had signed a letter of intent with Sako for the development of a new rifle system in two configurations, one for infantry designated marksmen and one as a sniper rifle.

At the time, the rifle system was known as the K22 (Finnish: Kokeilu 22, lit. 'Experiment 22'). The new rifle system was planned as a complete replacement for the existing Dragunov sniper rifle and as a partial replacement for the TKIV 85 sniper rifle.

The Inspector of the Infantry, Colonel Rainer Peltoniemi specified that the rifle system should be deliverable in 2022, be chambered in 7.62×51mm NATO and be more ergonomic than the previous systems. He noted, that at the time the K22 program did not have other participating nations, but other nations could join should they have similar needs for a rifle and a similar schedule.

In April 2021, the Finnish Defence Forces announced that they had signed an information exchange agreement with the Swedish Armed Forces concerning small arms. The Commander of the Finnish Army, Lieutenant General Petri Hulkko said in a press conference in October 2021 that Sweden was participating in the K22 program.

On 21 December 2021, the Finnish Defence Forces announced the procurement of the M23 in the planned two configurations, at an initial price of €10 million, with an option of up to €525 million. The purchase includes also equipment for the rifle, spare parts, servicing equipment and training for the system by Sako. At the same time, the Minister of Defence of Finland Antti Kaikkonen also authorised the Finnish Defence Forces to perform a joint acquisition with Sweden.

== Design ==
Short-stroke gas piston system

The Sako M23 is based on the American AR-10 and AR-15 (originally designed by Eugene Stoner), with a proprietary self-regulating short stroke gas piston.

As displayed in the announcement of the adoption of the rifle system by the Finnish Defence Forces, and confirmed by Major Mika Mäenpää, the rifle features a telescoping Magpul CTR stock, green ceramic surface treatment, ambidextrous controls, has a full length NATO Accessory Rail (STANAG 4694) on top of the receiver and handguard for sights and M-LOK rail on the handguard for various accessories.

FDF issued kit of the M23 includes 10 and 20 round magazines, bipod and an Ase Utra sound suppressor. The TKIV 23 has a Steiner Optics M7Xi 2.9–20×50 telescopic sight with the Finnaccuracy MSR reticle variant MSR FDF reticle, while the KIV 23 has a Trijicon VCOG 1–6×24 telescopic sight.

The Finnish Defence Forces also has signed a letter of intent with Nammo Lapua Oy for developing a domestically produced 7.62 cartridge for the Sako M23, the MG 3 and FN MAG which FDF uses.

== Adoption ==
=== Finland ===
The Finnish Defence Forces have adopted the rifle in two configurations, as the 7.62 KIV 23 (Finnish: Kivääri 2023, lit. 'Rifle 2023') designated marksman rifle variant and 7.62 TKIV 23 (Finnish: Tarkkuuskivääri 2023, lit. 'Sniper rifle 2023') variant, which are to enter service in 2023.

=== Sweden ===
In March 2023, Sweden announced it will procure 5.56 and 7.62 variants of the Sako ARG to replace their current carbine, rifle, and DMR inventory.

As of March 2023, the Swedish Defence Materiel Administration intends to buy the ARG in both 5.56 and 7.62 variants of different barrel lengths, as part of a larger project to replace their current small arms inventory.

The 5.56 personal defense weapon (SSV 24) will have an 11.5 inch barrel, an Aimpoint CompM5 red-dot sight and Magpul furniture.The introduction of the 5.56 variant will start in 2025, and the 7.62 variants will begin seeing service in 2026.

The 5.56 PDW variant with an 11.5" barrel will replace the current Swedish inventory of Ak 5D carbines and other PDWs, while the infantry 7.62 rifle (16" or 18") will replace existing Automatkarbin 5C rifles and Automatkarbin 4B/C rifles.

The 7.62 marksman variant (18" or 20") will replace the Ak 4D DMR. The Swedish procurement will supply both the armed forces (including Home Guard), police, customs service, SÄPO, and coast guard.

== Variants ==
- K22 – prototype
- 7.62 KIV 23 – designated marksman rifle
- 7.62 TKIV 23 – sniper rifle

== Users ==
- Finland
- Sweden

== See also ==
- Sako ARG
- M110 Semi-Automatic Sniper System
- Heckler & Koch HK417
