= Patria TRACKX =

- Type: Amphibious tracked armoured personnel carrier
- Place of origin: Finland

Production history
- Designer: Patria
- Manufacturer: Patria
- Developed from: Patria 6×6

Specifications
- Mass: 15 t (17 short tons)
- Length: 7.3 m (24 ft)
- Width: 2.95 m (9.7 ft)
- Height: 2 m (6.6 ft) (to roof plate)
- Crew: 2 (driver, commander)
- Passengers: 10
- Armor: Ballistic protection: STANAG 4569 Level 1 Mine protection: STANAG 4569 Level 1
- Engine: Caterpillar C7.1 in-line 6 engine 269.0 kW (360.7 hp); 1,423 N⋅m (1,050 ft⋅lb)
- Power/weight: 17.93 kW/t (24.04 hp/t)
- Drive: Tracked (rubber tracks); Track width: 56 cm (1 ft 10 in); Ground pressure: 32 kPa (4.6 psi)
- Transmission: Renk HSWL076 (automatic transmission, 6 forward / 6 reverse gears) with drive-by--wire capability
- Ground clearance: 55 cm (1 ft 10 in)
- Operational range: 500 km (310 mi)
- Maximum speed: Land speed: 80 km/h (50 mph); Amphibious swimming speed: 4 km/h (2.5 mph)

The Patria TRACKX is an amphibious tracked armoured personnel carrier designed by the Finnish defence industry company Patria.

== Variants ==
=== Variants in development ===
==== APC ====
The base variant is intended to become an APC.

=== Potential variant ===
==== Mortar carrier ====
Patria presented the TRACKX with the Patria NEMO, as a mortar carrier.

==== Light artillery ====
KNDS presented a concept of a TRACKX equipped with a 105 mm LG artillery cannon (GIAT LG1).

==== Uncrewed Ground Vehicle ====
Patria and Renk presented an UGV concept based on the TRACKX at Eurosatory 2026.

== Operators ==
=== Future operators ===
Finland
Finland and Sweden signed an Implementation Agreement in June 2026 at the Eurosatory fair for the preparation of its procurement. A Statement of Intent on the development and cooperation of the Trackx signed in July 2026 at the 2026 Ankara NATO summit.
A pre-production run of 5 vehicles was ordered on 30 September, 2026.
Sweden
Finland and Sweden signed an Implementation Agreement in June 2026 at the Eurosatory fair for the preparation of its procurement. A Statement of Intent on the development and cooperation of the Trackx was signed in July 2026 at the 2026 NATO Summit in Ankara.
A pre-production run of 5 vehicles was ordered on 30 September, 2026.

=== Potential operators ===
Latvia
A Statement of Intent on the development and cooperation of the Trackx was signed in July 2026 at the 2026 NATO Summit in Ankara.
