= Sako 75 =

Sako M75
- Type: Rifle
- Place of origin: Finland

Production history
- Manufacturer: Sako
- Produced: 1996–2006

Specifications
- Cartridge: .222 Rem to .500 Jeffery
- Action: Bolt action
- Feed system: Push feed
- Sights: Proprietary tapered dovetail rail for attaching optical sights

The Sako 75 is a bolt-action rifle produced by the Finnish manufacturer Sako from 1996 until it was replaced by its successor, the Sako 85 in 2006, and finally discontinued in 2007.

== History ==
The Sako 75 was named after the 75 year anniversary of Sako in 1996, when the first Sako 75 was made. The Model 75 was externally very similar to earlier Sako models, but its construction was different, having 3 symmetrical locking lugs, a manual ejector, and a detachable magazine. Hitherto, only one Sako rifle, the L46, had a detachable magazine.

== Models ==
The rifle was marketed as Sako's premium model for hunting, and was delivered in many different configurations and chamberings. Examples of some Sako 75 models are:

- Hunter
- Hunter Stainless
- Hunter left hand
- Laminated stainless
- Deluxe
- Synthetic stainless
- Finnlight
- Varmint
- Varmint Laminated Stainless

== Technical ==
The trigger pull weight is adjustable between 1 and 2 kg. The action can be cycled with the safety applied. The scope sight in the receiver bridge is a proprietary tapered dovetail rail with variable width (narrow at the rear, wide at the front). Proprietary scope rings are available, and aftermarket picatinny rail adapters are also available. The entirety of the bolt, including its handle, is milled from a single piece of cast steel.

The Sako 75 has a push feed mechanism, compared to its successor Sako 85 which has controlled feeding. The M75 and M85 also have different types of magazines.

=== Receiver lengths ===
The receiver was delivered in 6 different lengths depending on the cartridge group, graded with roman numerals from I to V:

I (Short)

- .222 Rem
- .223 Rem

II (PPC)

- .22 PPC USA
- 6 mm PPC USA

III (Medium)

- .22-250
- .243 Win
- .260 Rem
- 7 mm-08 Rem
- .308 Win

SM (Short magnum)

- .270 WSM
- .300 WSM

IV (Long)

- .25-06
- 6.5×55 mm
- .270 Win
- 7×64 mm
- .30-06
- 9.3×62 mm
- 9.3×66 mm

V (Magnum)

- 7 mm Rem Mag
- .300 Win Mag
- .375 H&H
- .416 Rem Mag

== See also ==
- Sako TRG
- Tikka T3
- Sako 85
- Sako S20
