= 7.62 Tkiv 85 =

7.62 TKIV 85
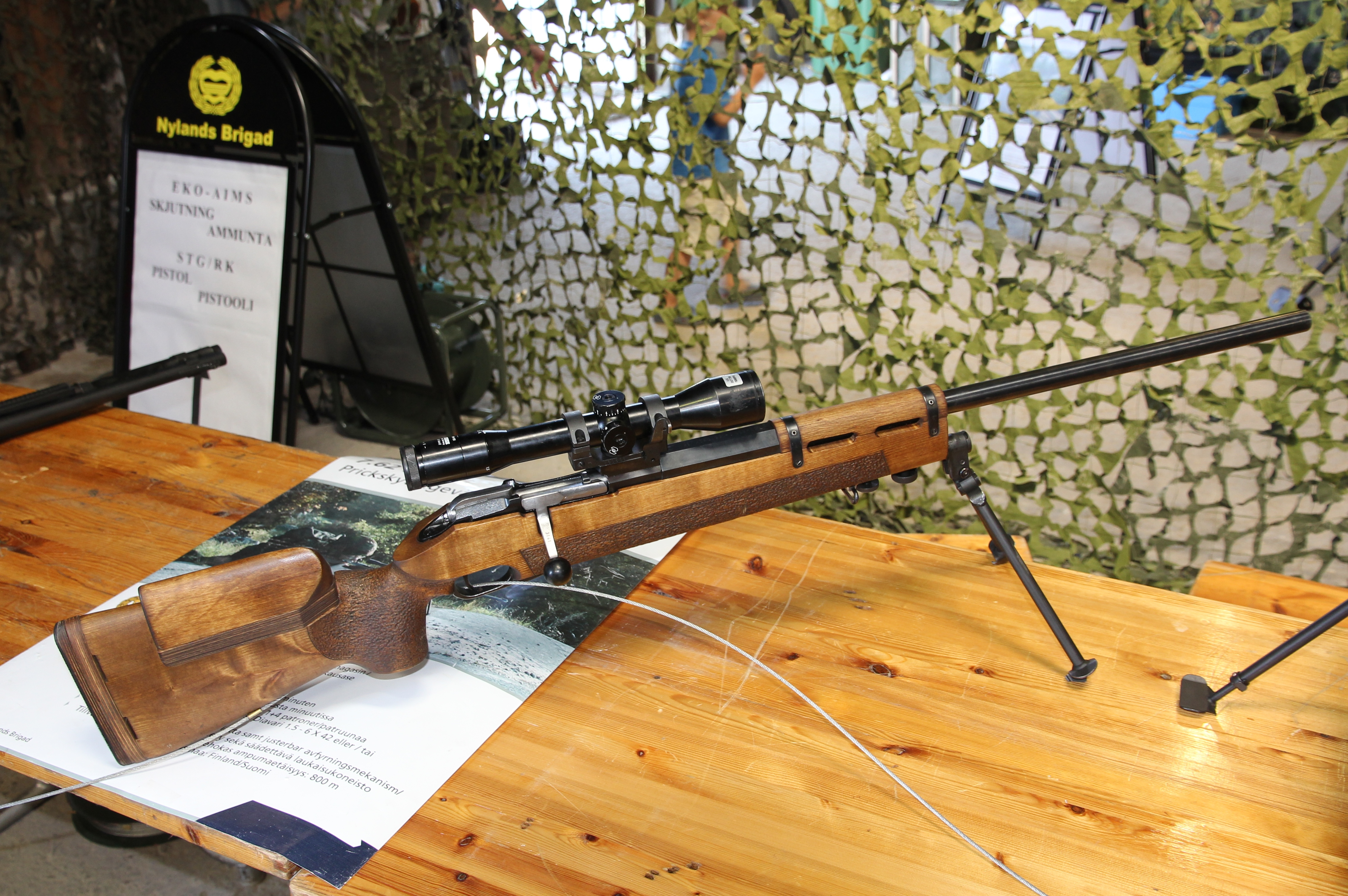
- 7.62 TKIV 85.
- Type: Sniper rifle
- Place of origin: Finland

Service history
- In service: 1984–present
- Used by: Finnish Defence Forces (FDF)

Production history
- Designed: 1984
- Manufacturer: Valmet, FDF Asevarikko 1
- Produced: 1984–1985

Specifications
- Mass: 7 kg (15.4 lb)
- Length: 1,300 mm (51.2 in)
- Cartridge: 7.62×53mmR
- Action: Bolt action
- Rate of fire: 8–10 rounds/min
- Effective firing range: 800 m (875 yd)
- Feed system: 5-round magazine
- Sights: Zeiss Diavari ZA 1.5–6×42 or Schmidt & Bender 4×36 telescopic sights Simrad KN 250/252 F nightscope

The 7.62 TKIV 85, short for 7.62 Tarkkuuskivääri 85 (7.62 sniper rifle 85) is a sniper rifle used by the Finnish Defence Forces.

It is derived from Mosin–Nagant, with Finland having made various derivatives of the rifle. The design was made in 1984 by Valmet, which also manufactured new barrels for these rifles. The rifles were assembled in 1984–1985 by Finnish Defence Forces (FDF) Asevarikko 1 ("Arsenal 1") in Kuopio, Finland. The 7.62 TKIV 85 sniper rifle has been extensively modified, while retaining the use of Mosin-Nagant style bolt-action.

One exclusive feature of the 7.62 TKIV 85 is its 7.62×53mmR chambering. No other currently used military firearm is chambered for this unique Finnish cartridge. Russian made firearms used by the FDF, such as Dragunov sniper rifle and PKM machine gun, are chambered for the 7.62×54mmR cartridge. The standard operating procedure calls for the use of 7.62×54mmR cartridges in 7.62 TKIV 85 rifles only in emergency situations when 7.62×53mmR ammunition is not available. The reason for this is the bullet diameter difference of 7.85 mm (0.309 in) in the 7.62×53mmR versus 7.92 mm (0.312 in) in the 7.62×54mmR. Some 7.62×53mmR rounds were also loaded with an intermediate 7.88 mm (0.310 in) diameter bullet.

On 25 May 2020, SAKO and Finnish Defence Forces signed a letter of intent regarding research and development of a family of rifles to replace the TKIV 85 and Dragunov sniper rifles. The sniper rifle version of the Sako M23 is 7.62 TKIV 23.
