= Sako Finnfire =

- Type: Repeating rifle
- Place of origin: Finland

Production history
- Designer: Sako

Specifications
- Length: 1,006–1,056 mm (39.6–41.6 in)
- Barrel length: 560–610 mm (22–24 in)
- Cartridge: .22 LR
- Action: Bolt action
- Sights: 11 mm (0.43 in) dovetail rail

Sako Finnfire, also known as the Sako Finnfire P94S, is a bolt action rifle made by Finnish firearms manufacturer Sako. The rifle was introduced in 1996, and is no longer in production. The Finnfire was largely based on the Finnscout 78, and also shared some parts with the TRG-S (M995) centerfire series of rifles. One of the main differences compared to the Finnscout 78 was that many of the steel parts on the Finnscout 78 had been replaced with plastic parts, such as for example the trigger guard and the magazine. The rifle had an adjustable single stage trigger where the pull weight could be set between 1–2 kg with a similar design as the TRG-S series.

The Finnfire was first launched in the Hunter version, which was followed by the larger Varmint version with a wider forend and heavier barrel. The even larger Range version was added later. All the versions came with walnut stocks and a free floating barrel. The Hunter version had the slimmest stock, while the Varmint version had a wider forend and a rubberized recoil pad, and the Range version stock was the heaviest stock intended for precision rifle shooting, but still became popular with some types of hunters. Only the Hunter version came with open sights, but it was not uncommon to remove those and instead attach a scope sight to the dovetail rail.

The receiver is machined from a piece of steel, and the barrel was mounted in the receiver with a push fit and attached with two cross bolts. The barrels were hammer forged with a 412.75 mm (16 1/4") rifling twist. The Finnfire Hunter was delivered with a 560 mm (22") long barrel, while the Varmint and Range version were delivered with a 610 mm (23") long barrel. Only later production models were delivered with a threaded muzzle from the factory. The bolt has two locking lugs on the back, and the bolt lift is 50 degrees.

== See also ==
- Sako Quad
- Sako Finnfire II
