= RK 71 =

Finnish assault rifle

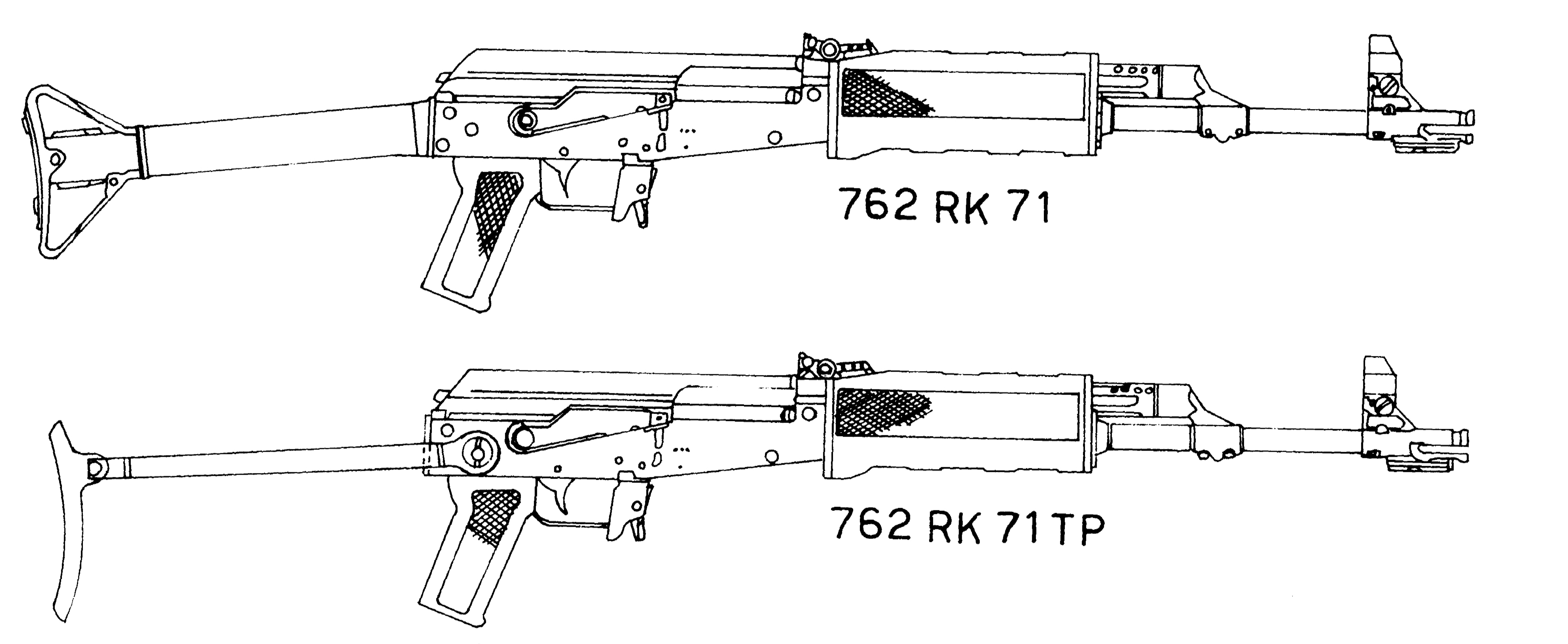
- RK 71 and RK 71 TP
- Type: Assault rifle
- Place of origin: Finland

Service history
- Used by: Users

Production history
- Designer: Valmet
- Designed: 1966–1971
- Manufacturer: Valmet
- Produced: 1970–1976
- Variants: RK 71; RK 71 TP; M71/S; M72; TAK

Specifications
- Mass: 3.5 kg empty
- Length: 928 mm (RK 71); 922 mm stock extended, 680 mm stock folded (RK 71 TP); 925 mm (M71/S)
- Barrel length: 420 mm (RK 71 and M71/S)
- Cartridge: 7.62×39mm.223 Remington/5.56×45mm NATO (M71/S)
- Action: Gas-operated, rotating bolt
- Rate of fire: 650 rounds/min
- Muzzle velocity: 715 m/s
- Effective firing range: 300 m
- Feed system: 30-round detachable AK magazine (7.62×39mm); 15 or 30-round detachable double-stack staggered-feed box magazine (5.56×45mm)
- Sights: Open rear sight, adjustable between 200 and 500 metres, forward post with flip-up tritium illuminated post, 375 mm sight radius

The RK 71 (Finnish: Rynnäkkökivääri 71, lit. 'Assault rifle 71'), commercially M71, is a Finnish assault rifle designed and manufactured by Valmet. It is based on the RK 62, which in turn is based on the Soviet AK-47. Finnish Defence Forces (FDF) tested the 7.62 RK 71 between 1971 and 1973 as a possible replacement of the RK 62, but logistics issues prevented its larger adoption by FDF. The rifle was also exported to Qatar.

== History ==
During the development of the Valmet RK 62 both the Valmet development team and Finnish Defence Forces HQ were contemplating on whether milling the receiver was the right choice or not, as well as whether the sights should be open sights or aperture sights. In 1962 FDF HQ and Valmet developed a prototype stamped receiver assault rifle, for possible quick and less labour and material intensive wartime production, called RK X. The rifle had a different receiver layout, but the action was same as in the RK 62.

In 1966 FDF and Valmet reached an agreement on the development of an assault rifle with a stamped receiver. The first prototype in 1967 was based on the RK X, with some influence from the Spanish CETME rifle (such as the location of the charging handle), but FDF HQ didn't accept it to further development. In 1968 FDF HQ sent more definitive requirements for the stamped receiver assault rifle, which was to be more similar to the RK 62 in layout and it was to be delivered in four different configurations, and a fifth prototype configuration was to be designed based on the experiences from the features of the prototypes.

The fifth prototype was delivered in 1969, and after a request of some minor changes to its sights, FDF HQ and Valmet made a deal on the production of a prototype series of 100 rifles for field trials. 90 of the weapons were to be of the fixed tubular stock variant (a stock similar to the stock in RK 62), 10 of the folding stock variant. The series was completed in June 1971, but due to delays in FDF accepting the tritium night sight inserts, they were delivered to FDF four months later, in October 1971.

In 1973 Valmet manufactured a stronger locking system for the folding stock versions, which FDF had noticed to start wobbling due to wear in the field trials, but it was never installed, as the prototype series were withdrawn from service to the FDF weapons depots.

In 1974 the FDF HQ Infantry Weapons Technical Department designed a sniper rifle called TAK based on the RK 71, which was chambered in the Finnish 7.62×53mmR cartridge. The rifle was fed from 20-round Lahti-Saloranta magazines, and had a 725 mm long, but quite thin barrel, which still retained the front sight and flash hider. The receiver was strengthened by a welded, pinned and riveted rib installed on the outside of the left wall of the receiver, to which the optical sight was also attached. Despite the ad hoc strengthening, the rifle with its light but long barrel suffered from poor accuracy, which was attributed to the structural decisions in the rifle, and the project was shelved. FDF attributed the failure to Valmet's decision to use the less sturdy stamped receiver instead of the milled receiver, while Valmet accused the FDF specifications as unfit for a sniper rifle. Later on, Valmet designed a remarkably strengthened stamped receiver based on the RK 62 76 for heavier calibres, which was used on the Valmet M78.

In 1974–1975 Valmet designed a 5.56×45mm NATO conversion of the RK 71, which was manufactured to export for civilians as the M71/S.

== Design ==
Gas operation with a long-stroke piston.

The main operating mechanism is based on the Kalashnikov gas operation with a long-stroke piston like the RK 62, with minor modifications. As in stamped receiver Kalashnikov-type rifles, the receiver consists of a stamped body, front and rear trunnions which are pinned, riveted and spot welded to the receiver body, and stamped rails for the bolt carrier, which are spot welded to the sides of the receiver body. The bolt with its two locking lugs locks to the front trunnion, to which the barrel is threaded and pinned to.

The receiver is slightly wider than in the RK 62, which makes the trigger group pins and selector switch of the RK 71 incompatible with the other RK variants. Even though the later RK 62 76 is stamped as is the RK 71, the RK 62 76 accepts the same parts as the RK 62, unlike the RK 71. The other trigger group parts, the bolt and the bolt carrier are interchangeable between the RK 62 and RK 71.

The magazine is the same AK-type magazine as in the AK-47 and RK 62. The 5.56 variant however has a specific Valmet-designed magazine, which is only interchangeable with other 5.56 Valmet RK-type rifles.

The sight layout is different from the RK 62, and similar to the Soviet AK rifles. The rear sight is moved from the rear of the receiver cover to the rear of the gas tube (in front of the receiver cover) and the front sight is moved from the top of the gas port to the muzzle end of the barrel. The rear sight consists of an elevation adjustable square notch slider on a bar welded to the gas tube, with range settings for 200, 300, 400 and 500 metres. The front sight is fully windage adjustable, with protective ears and an L-shaped flip-up post, with a thinner day post and a thicker night post with tritium illumination. The front sight base is built in on the flash hider; the three-prong design of the flash hider is identical to the RK 62. The bayonet lug is also machined in the flash hider as in the RK 62, and the blank firing adapter can be attached to it in the same way as in the RK 62.

The gas tube and piston are also slightly different from the RK 62. The gas tube has indentations like the AK-47, and the gas piston is similar to the AK-47 as it lacks the notched ring which is in the RK 62.

The pistol grip and handguard are made of a plastic called Maranyl A 190; FDF also tested a laminated fiberglass pistol grip and handguard in five of the field test series rifles. The chrome plated M72 variant has walnut pistol grips and handguards.

The buttstock in the baseline model is tubular as in the RK 62; also, a fully plastic stock was tested but rejected by FDF due to durability issues. The plastic stock was however installed to some of the exported civilian variants; though, most of the civilian variants were equipped with a walnut stock, as was the M72. The folding stock variant has an AKS-47 type stock, which had its locking system reinforced by Valmet, after field trials showed it had a tendency to start wobbling after some use.

== Variants ==
=== RK 71 ===
Baseline 7.62×39mm model with tubular stock and plastic handguard and pistol grip.

==== RK 71 TP ====
Folding stock variant with an AKS-47 style stock.

=== M72 ===
Chromed variant for the Royal Guard of the Qatar Armed Forces in 7.62×39 with walnut stock, handguard and pistol grip.

=== TAK ===
Sniper rifle prototype designed by FDF HQ Infantry Weapons Technical Department, chambered in 7.62×53mmR.

=== RK 71/S ===
CIvilian variant, available in both 5.56×45mm NATO and 7.62×39. Both wooden and plastic stock variants.

=== Further development ===
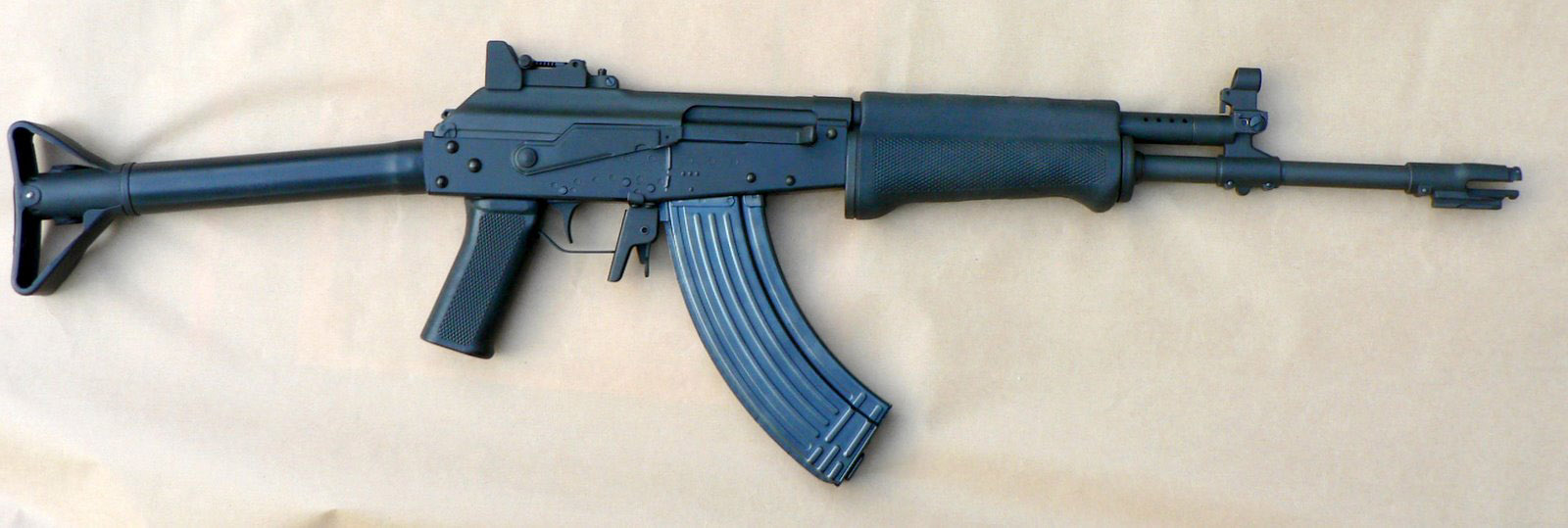
RK 62 76.

==== RK 62 76 ====
Stamped receiver variant of the RK 62, the manufacture of which used stamping techniques developed for the RK 71.

==== Valmet M78 ====
Light machine gun variant of the RK 62 76, which uses a similar sight layout as the RK 71.

==== Valmet M78/83S ====
Sniper rifle/designated marksman rifle variant of the M78.

== Users ==
- Finland
- Qatar
