= Sako Finnfire II =

- Type: Repeating rifle
- Place of origin: Finland

Production history
- Designer: Sako

Specifications
- Mass: 2.8 kg (6.2 lb)
- Length: 1,025 mm (40.4 in)
- Barrel length: 560 mm (22 in)
- Cartridge: .17 HMR, .22 LR
- Action: Bolt action
- Sights: 11 mm (0.43 in) dovetail rail

Sako Finnfire II is a bolt action rifle made by Finnish firearms manufacturer Sako since 2014. Even if the Finnfire II is related namewise to the older Sako Finnfire from 1996, it technically has a mix of features from the Sako Finnfire and the newer Sako Quad. The receiver has many similarities with the Quad, but the barrel interface to the receiver is neither similar to the quick change barrel system of the Quad nor the threaded interface of the Finnfire. Instead of using two cross bolts like on the Finnfire, the Finnfire II uses a cross pin such that the barrel is not easily swapped by the user. The bolt has two locking lugs and a 50 degree bolt lift. Factory barrels are available chambered in either .17 HMR or .22 LR, and have rifling twists of 229 mm (1:9") and 419 mm (1:16 1/2"). The muzzle is threaded from the factory (1/2"-20 threads, which corresponds to approximately 12.7 x 1.270 mm in metric designation). The rifle has an adjustable single stage trigger with where the pull weight can be set between 1–2 kg, and is also available as a set trigger.

== See also ==
- Sako Finnfire
- Sako Quad
