= Sako Quad =

- Type: Bolt-action rifle
- Place of origin: Finland

Production history
- Designer: Sako

Specifications
- Mass: 2.6–3.5 kg (5.7–7.7 lb)
- Length: 1,020 mm (40 in)
- Barrel length: 560 mm (22 in)
- Cartridge: .17 Mach 2 (.17 HM2), .17 HMR, .22 LR, .22 WMR
- Action: Bolt action
- Sights: 11 mm (0.43 in) dovetail rail

Sako Quad is a bolt-action rifle made by the Finnish firearms manufacturer Sako. Quad is delivered in many configurations, and has a quick change barrel system which lets the user swap barrels using a 5 mm hex key. The bolt lift is 50 degrees. Sako Quad factory barrels are delivered chambered for .17 Mach 2 (.17 HM2), .22 LR, .17 HMR and .22 WMR. There are two types of magazines, one type for the shorter .17 HM2 and .22 LR, and another for .17 HMR and .22 WMR.

Visually, the Sako Quad has many similarities with Sako Finnfire. The Quad is delivered with a blued receiver and barrel, and the barrels are color coded according to their chambering. In cooperation with Sako, Burris has developed a scope sight with corresponding color coding on its elevation turret to match the ballistics of the different cartridges. The stock is available in either wood or synthetic material. The synthetic stock is available with a rubberized grip. The trigger is adjustable from 500 g to 2000 g.

== See also ==
- Sako Finnfire
- Sako Finnfire II
