= 7.62×53mmR =

Finnish rifle cartridge

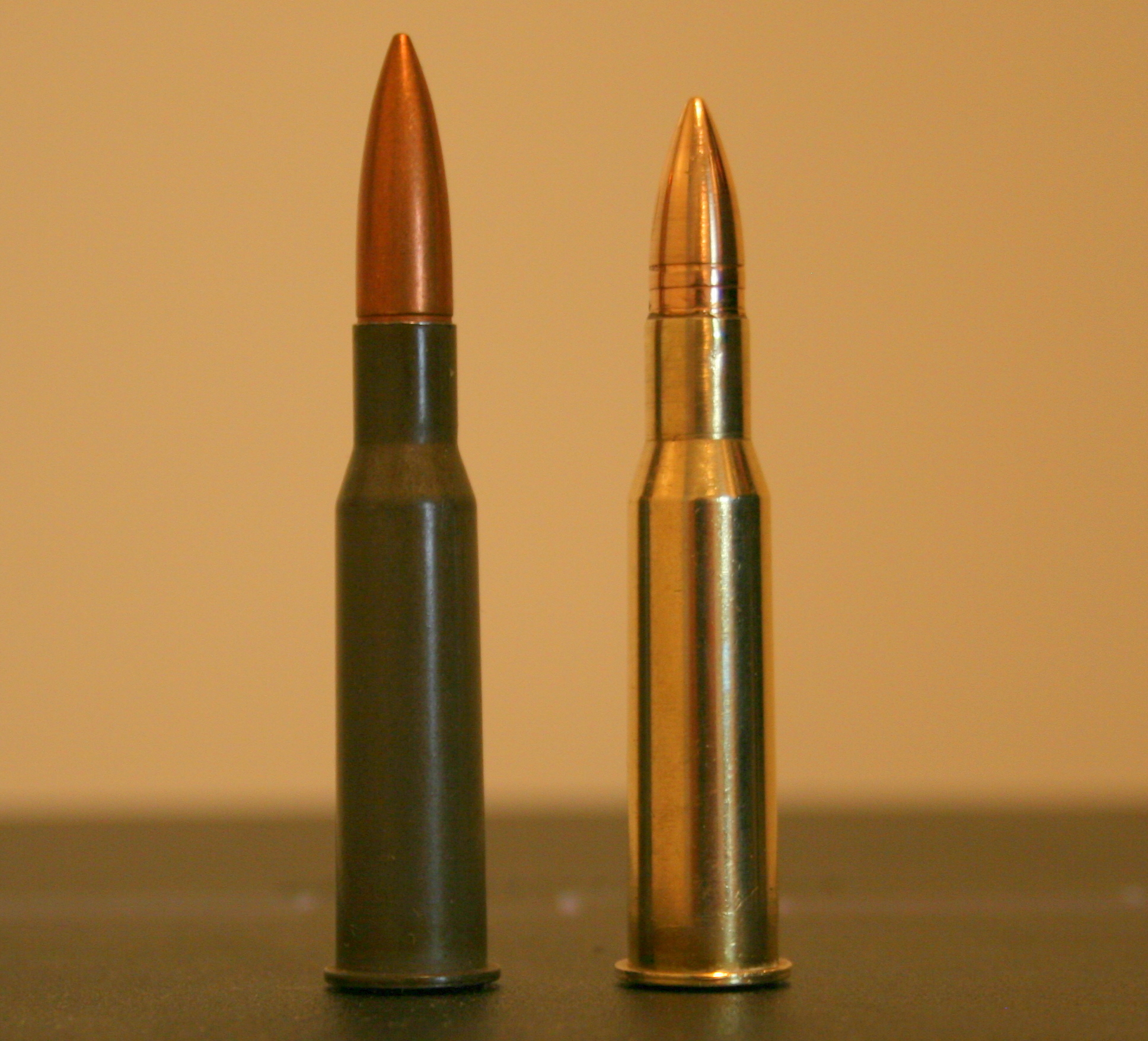
- 7.62×53mmR cartridges
- Type: Rifle
- Place of origin: Finland

Service history
- In service: 1918–present
- Used by: Finland

Production history
- Designed: 1918
- Produced: 1918–present

Specifications
- Parent case: 7.62×54mmR
- Case type: Rimmed, necked
- Bullet diameter: 7.85 mm (0.309 in)
- Land diameter: 7.59 mm (0.299 in)
- Neck diameter: 8.55 mm (0.337 in)
- Shoulder diameter: 11.61 mm (0.457 in)
- Base diameter: 12.42 mm (0.489 in)
- Rim diameter: 14.40 mm (0.567 in)
- Rim thickness: 1.60 mm (0.063 in)
- Case length: 53.50 mm (2.106 in)
- Overall length: 77.00 mm (3.031 in)
- Case capacity: 4.16 cm^{3} (64.2 gr H_{2}O)
- Rifling twist: 300 mm (1 in 11.81 in)
- Primer type: Berdan
- Maximum pressure: 390.00 MPa (56,565 psi)

Ballistic performance
Bullet mass/type	Velocity	Energy
185.4 gr (12 g) FMJ	812 m/s (2,660 ft/s)	3,960 J (2,920 ft⋅lbf)

The 7.62×53mmR (designated as 7,62 × 53 R by the C.I.P.) rifle cartridge is a Finnish design based on the Russian 7.62×54mmR round dating back to 1891.

== History ==
After gaining its independence in 1917 and after the Finnish Civil War of 1918, large numbers of Model 1891 Mosin–Nagant rifles were in the hands of the Finnish military. As the old barrels were worn out, they were replaced by new 7.83 mm (.308 in) barrels and the leftover 7.62×54mmR cartridges being in short supply, a domestic product was needed. This gave birth to the 7.62×53mmR.

In the late 1930s the Finnish Army started loading military cartridges with domestically produced 7.87 mm (.310 in) diameter D166 bullets as the production of new M39 "Ukko-Pekka" rifles barreled for 7.62×54R diameter bullets started. This change was due in part to allow the use of captured Soviet ammunition and machine gun ammunition which often was of a slightly greater bore diameter than its Finnish counterparts. The rifling twist rate was also changed from 300 mm (1 in 11.81 in) to 254 mm (1 in 10 in).

== Use ==
The 7.62×53mmR cartridge remains in military use to this day, although it is now only used by the 7.62 TKIV 85 sniper rifle. PKM machine guns and other Russian weapons in use by the Finnish Defence Forces use the 7.62×54mmR exclusively. The Finnish Defence Forces issued instructions that whenever possible, personnel issued with a rifle chambered for 7.62×53mmR (effectively the TKIV 85 rifle) should use 7.62×53mmR ammunition only, and that use of 7.62×54mmR is only allowed when 7.62×53mmR is not available.

== Cartridge dimensions ==
The 7.62×53mmR has 4.16 ml (64 grains) H_{2}O cartridge case capacity. The exterior shape of the case was designed to promote reliable case feeding and extraction in bolt-action rifles and machine guns alike, under extreme conditions.

7.62×53mmR maximum C.I.P. cartridge dimensions.All sizes in millimeters (mm).

Americans would define the shoulder angle at alpha/2 ≈ 19 degrees. The common rifling twist rate for this cartridge is 300 mm (1 in 11.81 in), 4 grooves, Ø lands = 7.59 mm, Ø grooves = 7.83 mm, land width = 4.20 mm and the primer type used to be Berdan, but nowadays large rifle is more common.

According to the official C.I.P. (Commission Internationale Permanente pour l'Epreuve des Armes à Feu Portatives) guidelines the 7.62 × 53 R case can handle up to 390 MPa (56,564 psi) piezo pressure. In C.I.P. regulated countries every rifle cartridge combo has to be proofed at 125% of this maximum C.I.P. pressure to certify for sale to consumers.

=== Differences between 7.62×53mmR (Finland) and 7.62×54mmR (Russia) ===
According to official C.I.P. rulings the TDCC sheets the 7.62 × 53 R and 7.62 × 54 R feature differences. C.I.P. rulings are indisputable legally binding for civilian use in C.I.P. member states like Finland and Russia. Only governmental organizations, like military and police forces and other firearms bearing public power agencies, from the C.I.P. member states are legally exempted from having to comply with C.I.P. rulings.

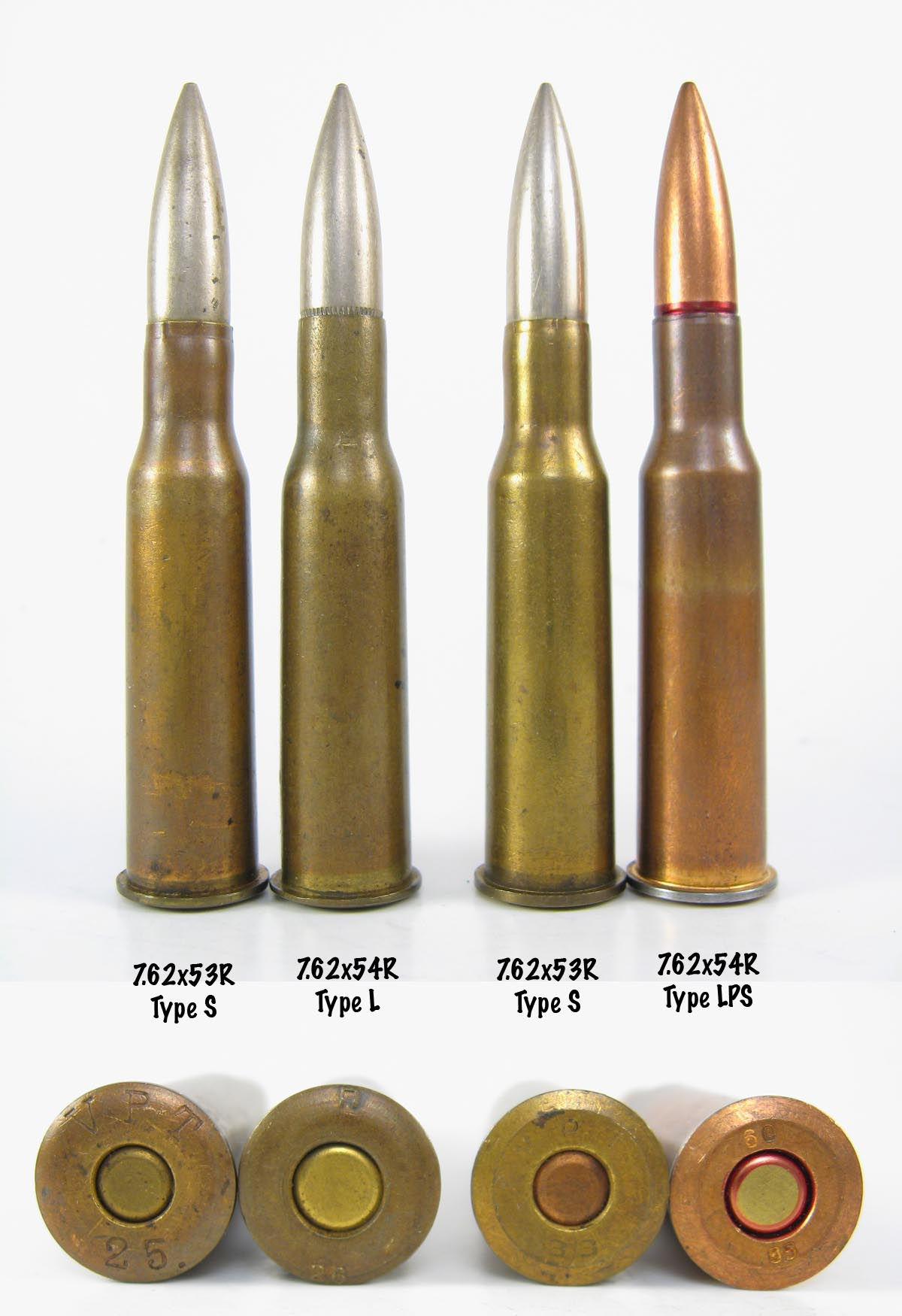
Comparison of Finnish 7.62×53mmR and Russian 7.62×54mmR cartridges

Some dimensional differences between the C.I.P. 7.62 × 53 R and 7.62 × 54 R TDCC sheets:

- C.I.P. 7.62×53R Bullet diameter (G1): 7.85 mm (vs. 54R: 7.92)
- C.I.P. 7.62×53R Round length (L6): 77.00 mm (vs. 54R: 77.16)
- C.I.P. 7.62×53R Case length (L3): 53.50 mm (vs. 54R: 53.72)
- C.I.P. 7.62×53R Rim diameter (R1): 14.40 mm (vs. 54R: 14.48)

The Finnish commercial ammunition manufacturer Lapua does not make a difference between the 53R and 54R, but produces cartridges that will function in weapons chambered for either one.

The Russian ammunition maker Barnaul states that Russian cartridges marked 7.62×53 are the same as 7.62×54. From their web site: "Some hunters have been confused because there have been varying marking on the package, case bottom and stamps: 7.62×53: 7.62×53R: 7.62×54: 7.62×54R. This happened because the 53.72 mm case length was rounded off differently in various countries. After Russia became a member of the European Permanent Coordinated Commission, the final name - "7.62×54R" - of the cartridge was accepted."

Additionally, Russian ammunition manufacturer LVE (Novosibirsk Cartridge Plant) states, "The cartridges cal.7,62×54R are produced by various producers around the world. Producers mark these cartridges differently, and this leads to confusion among the customers – 7.62х53; 7.62×53R; 7.62х54; 7.62×54R. The confusion is based on difference in rounding out (rounding up or rounding down) the case length (case length of our cartridges is 53.65-0.2 mm). The letter "R" indicates a case rim. After Russia’s joining European Commission (ПМК) a definite name of this cartridge was determined – 7,62×54R. Therefore, you may use cartridges of caliber 7.62х54R freely with your arms [marked as 7.62×53R]."

=== Derivative cartridges in Finland ===
After Finland declared independence in late 1917 with the fall of the Russian Empire, and especially after World War II, there were many Finnish military surplus rifles in 7.62×53mmR and captured Russian rifles chambered in 7.62×54mmR available to Finnish sportsmen and subsistence hunters. At one point the Finnish Authorities decided that there were too many wounded and escaped game animals that had not been humanely and quickly taken using the surplus military ammunition. Particularly when hunting large game such as moose and bear. They then had banned the use of the 7.62×53mmR and 7.62×54mmR for certain game species in certain areas. Finnish gunsmiths and cartridge companies responded and developed different derivative cartridges by "necking up" or "necking down" original 7.62 cases then trimming to correct case length specifications for the caliber to accept different diameter or "caliber" (therefore designed for different game) bullets for more humane hunting. These newer cartridges included 6.3×53mmR, 7×53mmR, 8.2×53mmR, and 9.3×53mmR. These bullet or projectile diameters were, and still are, common calibers for hunting rifles in Europe and much of the rest of the world, and are used in a variety of cartridge cases for different purposes. Therefore ammunition components are easily sourced for reloading purposes. It's crucial to consult official Finnish hunting regulations and local authorities to determine the specific legality of using the 7.62×53mmR cartridge for hunting specific game species in any particular area of Finland.

- 6.3×53mmR: non-CIP hunting cartridge developed in the 1940s, obsolete since 1971.
- 7×53mmR: non-CIP hunting cartridge developed in the 1930s, obsolete since the 1970s. 7.25 mm (.285) projectile.
- 8.2×53mmR (C.I.P.: 8,2 × 53 R): hunting cartridge developed in the 1930s, still occasionally manufactured by Sako up into the 2020s. 8.22 mm (0.3236) projectile per CIP, same as 7.92×57mm Mauser aka "8mm Mauser".
- 9.3×53mmR (C.I.P.: 9,3 × 53 R Finnish): hunting cartridge developed in the 1930s, still occasionally manufactured by Sako into the 2020s. A 9.30mm (.366 caliber) projectile per CIP, same as 9.3×62mm. In American "Wildcat" terms this would be an example of "necking up and resizing" a 7.62x54R case to accommodate a 9.3mm projectile.

== See also ==
- List of rimmed cartridges
- 7.62x54mmR
- 7.62 mm caliber
- Dragunov SVD
- Mosin–Nagant
- Degtyerev DP-28
- PK machine gun
- Russian M1910 Maxim
- 7.62 Tkiv 85
- Lahti-Saloranta M/26
