= Push feed and controlled feed =

Firearms - how a cartridge is fed into and extracted from the chamber

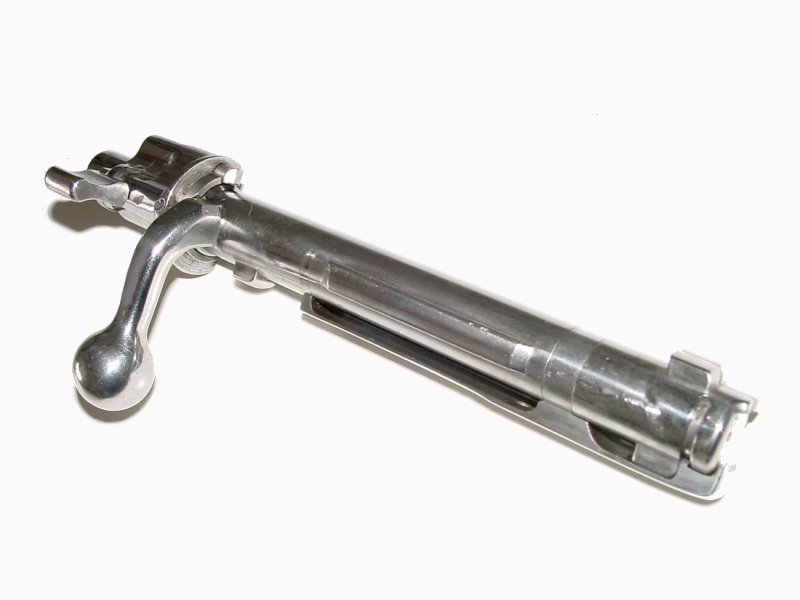
Mauser 98 bolt with controlled feed.

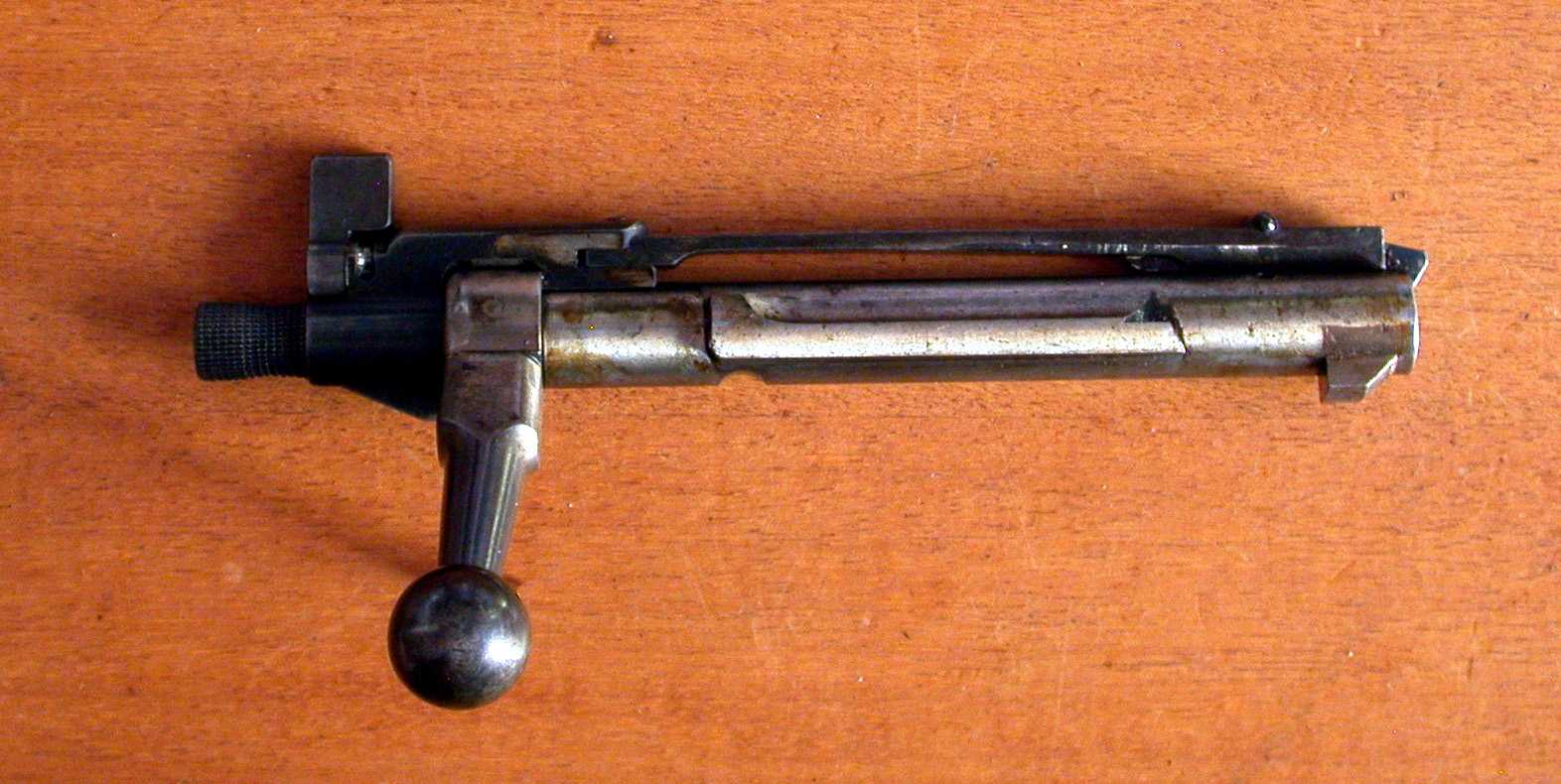
Krag–Jørgensen bolt with push feed.

Push feed and controlled feed (or controlled round feed) are two main types of mechanisms used in firearms to describe how the bolt drives the cartridge into the chamber and extracts the spent casing after firing.

- The push feed system does not grip the base of the cartridge before the cartridge has been fully entered into the chamber, and therefore under normal operation requires the cartridge to be fully chambered before it can be extracted.
- The controlled feed system grips the base of the cartridge with the extractor claw before the cartridge is stripped from the magazine, and therefore makes it possible to extract the cartridge before it has been fully chambered.

The better of the two systems has been debated for over 50 years, with both systems having their own strengths and weaknesses. Some prefer the controlled round feed for hunting dangerous game, while others state that either of the systems can be reliable or unreliable, depending for example on the quality of the rifle and maintenance. There has been a trend that newer rifle models tend to have a push feed mechanism, while almost every modern semi-auto pistol has a controlled feed mechanism. A push feed system in most cases is cheaper to manufacture than the more complex controlled feed mechanism.

== History ==
The first rifle with a controlled feeding mechanism was the M1885 Remington–Lee which first appeared in 1879. Lee applied for a patent, around the same time as Mauser applied for a patent on the same feature, DE51241 and US476290, which was introduced on the Mauser Model 1893.

== Discussion ==
=== Double feed ===
The main disadvantage with a push feed system is the possibility for a double feed malfunction if the bolt is not fully closed when chambering a round, followed with pulling the bolt back to strip another round from the magazine, resulting in one chambered and one partially chambered round. A double feed in itself is somewhat uncommon as an independent malfunction, but it often manifests itself as a consequence of other firearm malfunctions. A controlled feed mechanism should in theory not be able to double feed if it is set up correctly. In practice, however, double feed malfunctions sometimes also occur with controlled feed mechanisms.

=== Safety during case rupture ===
Push feed mechanisms in theory give the opportunity to design a safer firearm when it comes to a case rupture (for example due to overpressure or excessive headspace) since the bolt head can be designed with a smaller extractor claw which in turn gives the rest of the bolt head a bigger surface area and therefore better support for the cartridge during firing.

=== Ejector types ===
Most push feed mechanisms use a spring loaded plunger type of ejector situated at the breech face, and this system ejects the spent casing as soon as the case mouth clears the ejection port. Most controlled feed mechanisms use a fixed mechanical ejector attached to the receiver, which results in the bolt having to be pulled all or almost all the way back to eject the spent casing. This can give a marginally quicker cyclic rate with a push feed action, since the bolt no longer has to be repeated as far or all the way back.

=== Hand feeding directly into the chamber ===
Most controlled feed mechanisms should not be closed on a chamber already containing a cartridge (similar to how a push feed mechanism would operate). On the short term, this can result in difficulties with closing the bolt, and therefore also difficulties with extracting the unfired cartridge from the chamber. On the long term, the extractor may be significantly worn out or damaged, since the extractor claw on most controlled feed mechanisms has not been designed to slip over the rim of a chambered round. As a result, controlled feed mechanisms should always be fed with cartridges which first have been filled into the magazine.

One notable exception to this principle is the line of rifles based on the Ruger M77. This includes the Ruger M77 Mark II and Ruger Hawkeye rifles. While possessing a claw extractor and operating on the controlled feed principle, the M77 rifles have a "Mauser-type" bolt which is also designed to be able to "jump" over a round already in the chamber. This means that it is possible to feed a round directly into the chamber, as is possible with push-feed designs.

Push feed mechanisms on the other hand have an extractor which is designed to move around the rim of an already chambered round, and the cartridges can therefore either be fed via the magazine or hand fed directly into the chamber (sometimes called "single loading," providing one the ability to "top off" the magazine).

== Example firearms ==
=== Using controlled feed ===
- Mauser M98
- Kalashnikov rifle
- Winchester Model 70 (pre-1964, post-1992)
- Ruger M77 line
- Sako 85
- M1911 pistol

=== Using push feed ===
- Mosin–Nagant
- Weatherby Mark V
- Colt AR-15
- Winchester Model 70 (1964-1992)
- Remington 700
- Sako 75
- Ruger American Rifle

== See also ==
- Extractor/Ejector
- Pawl-type feeding mechanism, used on many belt fed firearms (such as MG 42, FN MAG, FN Minimi, etc.)
