= Sako ARG =

Finnish family of assault and battle rifles

- Type: Assault rifle Battle rifle Designated marksman rifle Sniper rifle
- Place of origin: Finland

Service history
- Used by: See Users

Production history
- Designer: SAKO
- Designed: 2020–2023
- Manufacturer: SAKO
- Produced: 2022–
- Variants: ARG 40 GP; ARG 40 DI; ARG 50 GP; M23; Ak 24; Ak 25

Specifications
- Mass: ARG 40 DI: 3.2 kg (7 lb); M23: 3.9 kg (9 lb); Ak 24: 3.2 kg (7 lb)
- Length: M23: 880 to 965 mm (35 to 38 in) (retractable stock); Ak 24: 714 to 800 mm (28.1 to 31.5 in)
- Barrel length: M23: 406.2 mm (16 in); Ak 24: 292 to 368 mm (11.5 to 14.5 in); Ak 25: 406.2 to 457.2 mm (16 to 18 in)
- Cartridge: 5.56×45mm NATO; 7.62×51mm NATO
- Action: Gas-operated, rotating bolt

The Sako ARG (lit. 'Arctic Rifle Generation') is a Finnish family of assault and battle rifles designed and manufactured by Sako.

== Background ==
Previously known as the K22 (Finnish: Kokeilu 22, lit. 'Experiment 22'), the ARG was designed along with the Finnish Defence Forces and the Swedish Armed Forces.

In October 2025, the Finnish Defence Forces announced that they will carry out field testing of 5.56 mm Sako rifles (based on the same design as the ARG). The trials will be used to determine requirements for a 5.56 mm rifle to replace the RK 62 and RK 95 TP as the standard Finnish service rifle.

As part of Project Grayburn, the ARG is being submitted as a potential replacement for the SA80 in the British military.

== Design ==
The ARG is based on the AR-10 and AR-15 design by Eugene Stoner but features a proprietary short-stroke gas piston system, similar to Heckler & Koch HK416 and other piston versions of AR-15-type assault rifles.

== Variants ==
=== ARG branding ===
==== ARG 40 GP ====
Assault rifle variant featuring short-stroke gas piston.

==== ARG 40 DI ====
Variant featuring direct impingent operation.

==== ARG S 40 MPK ====
Semi-auto 5.56 mm rifle made for the National Defence Training Association of Finland, equipped with a 16 inch barrel.

==== ARG S 40 Reserviläinen ====
Semi-auto 5.56 mm rifle made for the Finnish civilian market.

==== ARG 50 GP ====
Designated marksman rifle variant.

=== Military variants ===
==== Sako M23 ====
Finnish Defence Forces precision rifle variants.

===== 7.62 KIV 23 =====
Designated marksman rifle

===== 7.62 TKIV 23 =====
Sniper rifle

==== Automatkarbin 24 ====
Swedish Armed Forces variants.

===== Ak 24A =====
5.56 mm, 11.5 inch barrel assault rifle

===== Ak 24B =====
5.56 mm, 14.5 inch barrel assault rifle

===== Ak 25 =====
7.62 mm battle rifle

== Users ==
- Finland
- Sweden
