= Sako 85 =

Sako M85
- Type: Rifle
- Place of origin: Finland

Production history
- Manufacturer: Sako
- Produced: 2006–2022

Specifications
- Cartridge: .204 Ruger to .416 Rem Mag
- Action: Bolt action
- Feed system: Controlled feed
- Sights: Proprietary tapered dovetail rail for attaching optical sights

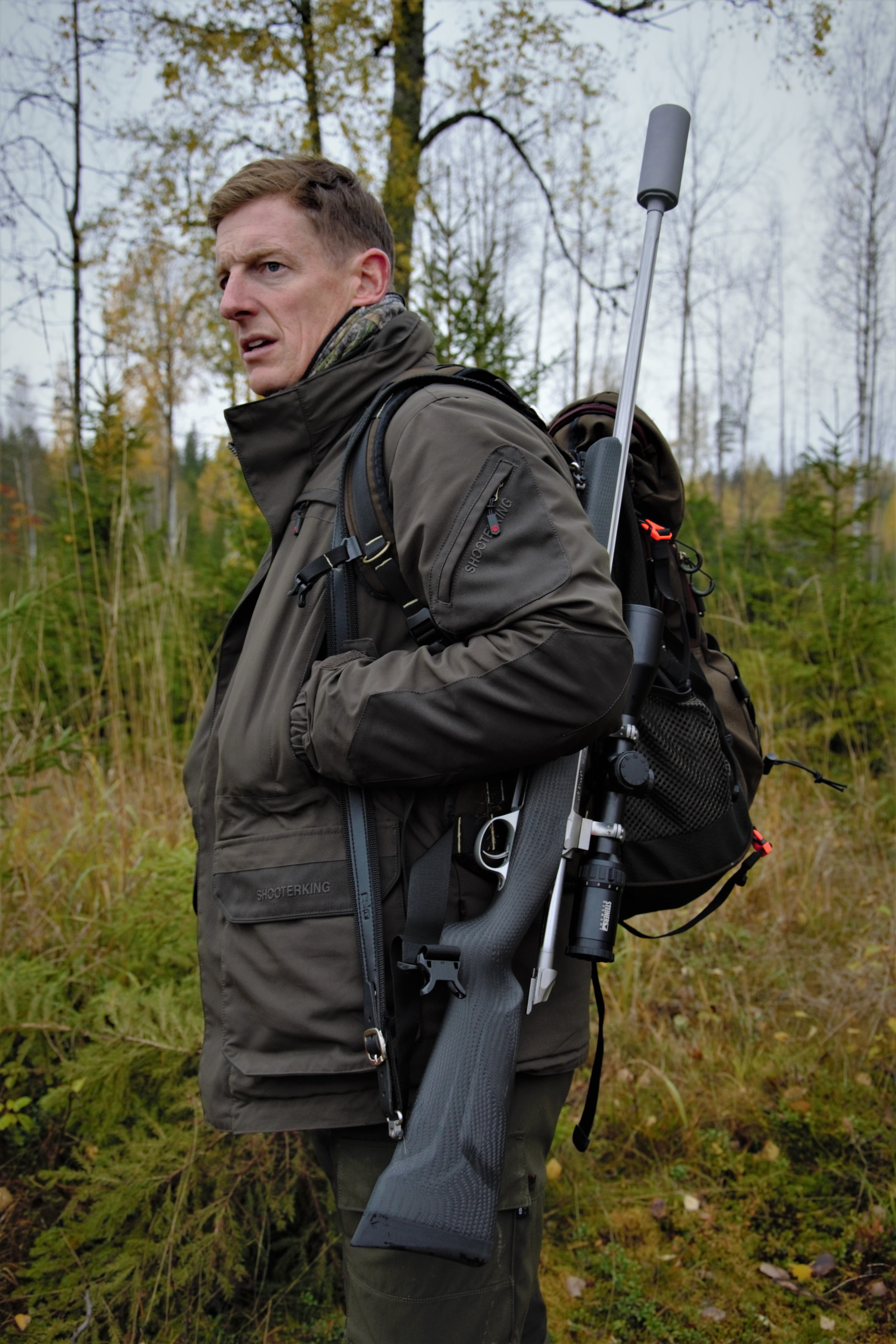
A hunter with a Sako 85

Sako 85 is a bolt-action rifle produced by the Finnish manufacturer Sako since 2006, and the name signifies that Sako celebrated 85 years that year. The model 85 is marketed as one of Sako's premium models for hunting, and is delivered in many different configurations and chamberings. According to Sako the rifle is available in over 1000 different configurations. Some examples are the Finnlight and Carbonlight models. Production ended at the end of 2022 for the newly introduced Sako 100.

== History ==
Sako 85 is the successor to the Sako 75. The M75 and M85 designs have many similarities, but also many differences. While Sako 75 has push feed, Sako 85 has controlled feed. The two models also have different types of magazines, and some parts such as the bottom metals do not interchange.

== Technical ==
The trigger pull weight is adjustable between 1–2 kg, and is delivered from the factory set to 1.5 kg. Sako 85 can also be delivered with a set trigger. The mechanism can be cycled with the safety applied. The bottom metal is made of aluminum for most of the M85 models, and is delivered in a color matching the receiver: Blued receivers are delivered with a black bottom metal, while stainless receivers are delivered with a grey bottom metal. The receiver has a proprietary integrated scope mount, which is a dovetail rail with varying width (narrower at the rear, wider at the front).

The Sako 85 is test fired at the factory with a 5-round group, which must satisfy a precision requirement better than 30 mm at 100 meters (0.3 mrad).

=== Stock ===
The rifle is delivered from the factory with a stock made of either walnut, laminate, plastic or carbon fiber, and with different shapes depending on the intended form of hunting or shooting discipline.

=== Receiver ===
The receiver is made in 6 different lengths depending on the cartridge group. The rationale behind the large number of action lengths is to achieve a good fit with the cartridge length, and thereby avoiding an unnecessary long bolt travel, as well as weight reduction.

Extra small (XS):

- .222 Rem
- .223 Rem

Small (S):

- .22-250 Rem
- .243 Win
- .260 Rem
- 6.5mm Creedmoor
- .308 Win
- 7 mm-08

Small-medium (SM):

- .270 Win Short Mag
- .300 Win Short Mag

Medium (M):

- .25-06 Rem
- .270 Win
- .30-06 Springfield
- 6.5x55 mm
- 7x64 mm
- 8x57 mm
- 9.3x62 mm
- 9.3x66 mm

Large (L):

- .300 Win Mag
- .338 Win Mag
- .375 H&H Mag
- 7 mm Rem Mag

Extra large (XL):

- .416 Rigby
- .450 Rigby
- .500 Jeffery

The bolt has three locking lugs, a 70 degree bolt lift, and is milled from a solid piece of cast steel (including the bolt handle). The bolt is cocked on opening, and has controlled feeding with the ejector fixed to the receiver. A special tool is provided for disassembly of the bolt. The bolt locks into the receiver.

Most models have a detachable magazine, and have a special form of locking to hinder unintentional release of the magazine. Some models instead have a hinged bottom metal. All types of magazines are double stack with staggered feed, which enables filling of the magazine while it is attached to the firearm.

=== Barrel ===
The factory barrel is either stainless or blued depending on the receiver. The action threads are imperial with 1"-16 TPI threads (in metric designation M25.4 x 1.588 mm). All factory barrels for Sako 85 are cold hammer forged, and can be delivered in various lengths, profiles and rifling twists, with or without iron sights, and either with a matte or polished finish.

== See also ==
- Sako TRG
- Tikka T3
- Sako S20
