= Sako S20 =

Finnish rifle

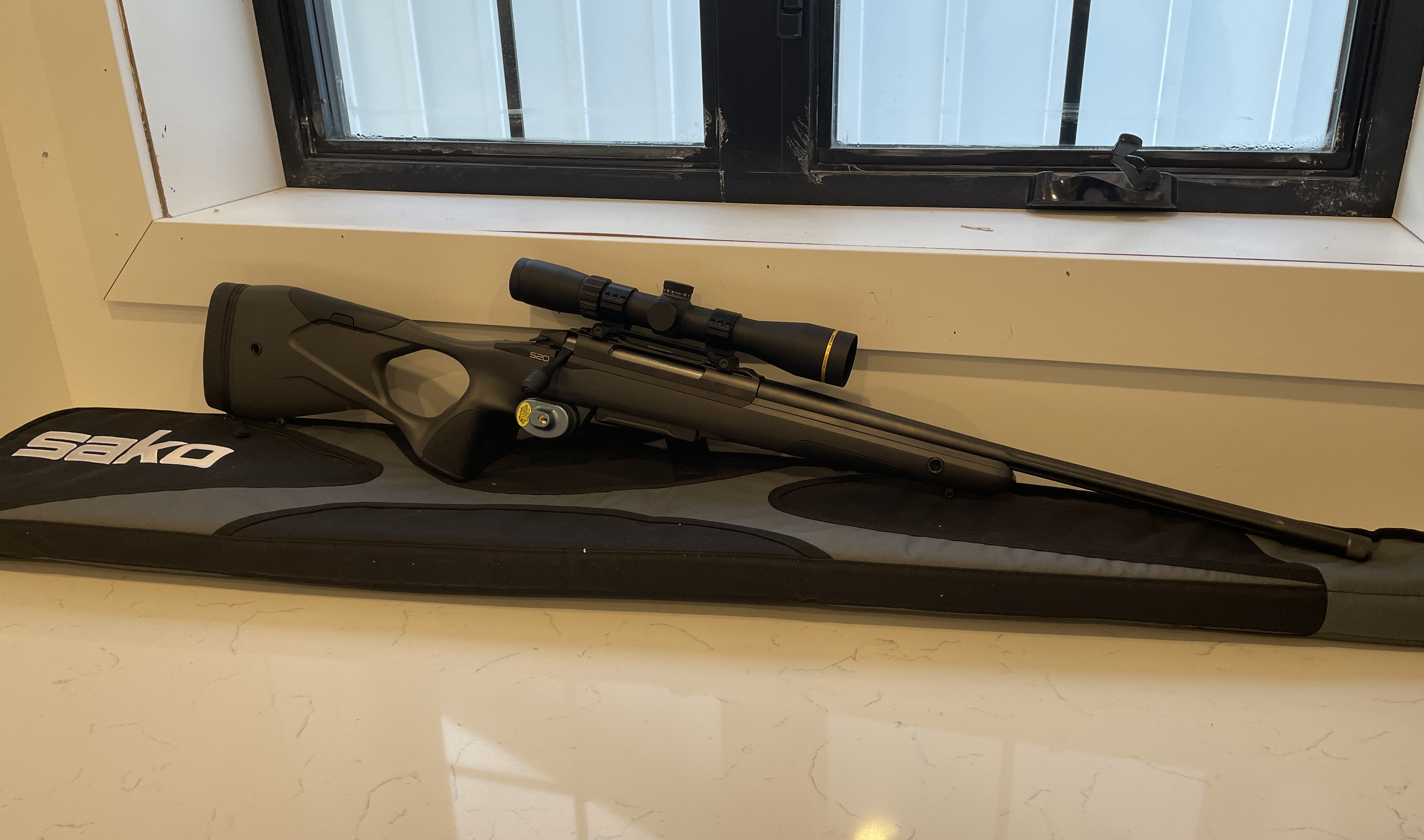
- S20 with hunter stock
- Type: Rifle; Precision rifle
- Place of origin: Finland

Production history
- Designer: Sako
- Designed: 2020; 5 years ago
- Manufacturer: Sako
- Unit cost: US$ 1600 (Hunter); US$ 1700 (Precision)
- Produced: 2020–
- Variants: Sako S20 Hunter; Sako S20 Precision

Specifications
- Mass: 3.3 kg (7.3 lb) to 4.0 kg (8.8 lb)
- Length: 109 cm (42.9 in); 119 cm (46.9 in)
- Barrel length: 51 cm (20.1 in); 61 cm (24.0 in)
- Cartridge: .243 Winchester; 6.5 Creedmoor; 6.5 PRC.270 Winchester; 7mm Remington Magnum.308 Winchester.30-06 Springfield.300 Winchester Magnum
- Action: Bolt action, 60° rotating bolt, three locking lugs
- Feed system: 5 or 10-round detachable double stack single feed box magazine 3 or 7-round detachable double stack single feed box magazine (magnum cartridges)
- Sights: Picatinny rail for day or night optics

The Sako S20 is a bolt-action rifle designed and manufactured by Finnish firearms company Sako since 2020. The rifle features an aluminium chassis, which allows for modularity and different configurations, due to which Sako calls it a hybrid rifle.

== History ==
Sako introduced the S20 rifle in 20 February 2020. At the date of its introduction, it is offered in two different main configurations, Hunter and Precision.

== Design ==
The S20 rifle features a steel receiver, which has two scope bases machined directly into it. The bottom of the receiver is milled to a V-shape for bedding into an aircraft-grade aluminium chassis for its whole length. The receiver and chassis are attached with three action screws. The S20 rifle is built on the TRG platform.

The cylindrical bolt features three locking lugs and is manufactured from stainless steel, and its handle is replaceable. The bolt throw is 60 degrees.

The barrel is cold hammerforged and is available in two different contours (fluted light, or smooth semi-heavy) and comes in lengths of 510 and 610 mm (20 and 24 in). The muzzle threading is 5/8-24 UNEF (3A tolerance class).

The stock, outside of the chassis, is made from high impact-resistant fiber-reinforced polymer. Both the front and rear parts of the stock are interchangeable and allow the difficult use as a takedown rifle; the hunter variant has a thumbhole grip, while the precision variant has a vertical grip. The stocks feature QD sling mounts, and the precision stock fore-end also features M-LOK accessory attachment points. The length of pull is adjustable with spacers and the stocks feature adjustable cheek risers with a visible dial number.

The trigger group is installed in an aluminium frame and has an adjustable pull weight of 1–2 kg (2.2–4.4 lb), and the trigger position can be adjusted front/back by 7 mm (0.28 in). Both single-stage and two-stage triggers are available. The safety blocks the firing pin when the it is engaged.

The magazines are detachable double-stack/single-feed magazines, and they are available in two different capacity: 5- or 10-round for standard short-action cartridges (.243 Winchester, 6.5 Creedmoor and .308 Winchester) and 3- or 7-round for long-action/magnum cartridges (6.5 PRC, .270 Winchester, 7mm Remington Magnum, .30-06 Springfield and .300 Winchester Magnum). The magazines also allow for longer-than-standard overall length for the ammunition.

The rifles can also be fitted with a wide array of accessories, including muzzle brakes, a thumb rest, barricade stop and such. Sako also manufactures a specific scope mount for 1 in (25.4 mm), 30 mm, 34 mm and 36 mm scopes, with three different saddle height options, or standard Picatinny rings may be used.

Sako guarantees a sub 0.3 mrad (1 MOA) accuracy for the rifle when using Sako factory ammunition.

== See also ==
- Sako TRG
