= Forearm (firearm component) =

Part of a gunstock between the receiver and muzzle

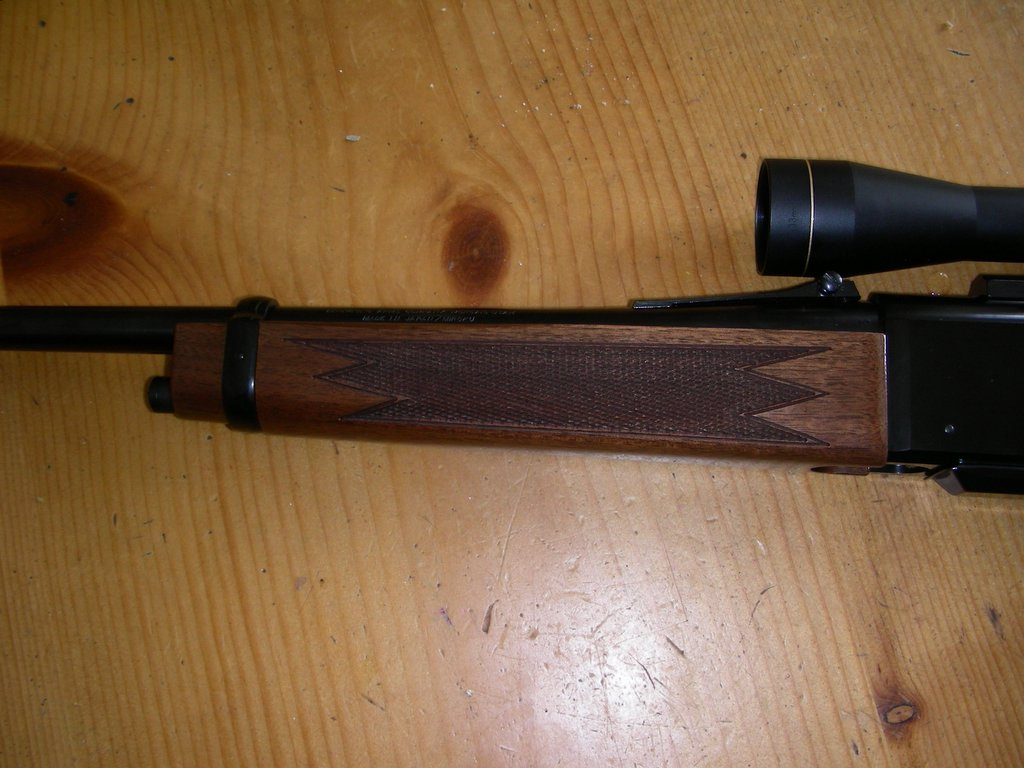
The wood forearm of a Browning BLR

In firearms, the forearm (also known as the fore-end/forend, handguard or forestock) is a section of a gunstock between the receiver and the muzzle. It is used as a gripping surface to hold the gun steady and is usually made out of heat-insulating material such as wood or reinforced plastic. Near the front of the forearm there is often an underside sling swivel stud and sometimes also a barrel-band to secure the forearm to the barrel (as seen in the photo).

Some forearms are equipped with additional heat shields to protect the user from heat radiating from the barrel when the firearm is fired.

== See also ==
- Glossary of firearms terms
- Thermal sleeve
- Vertical forward grip
