= SAKO =

Finnish firearm manufacturer

Sako Limited
- Native name: Sako Oy
- Type: Osakeyhtiö
- Industry: Arms
- Founded: 1921; 105 years ago
- Headquarters: Riihimäki, Finland
- Products: Firearms
- Parent: Beretta Holding
- Website: www.sako.global

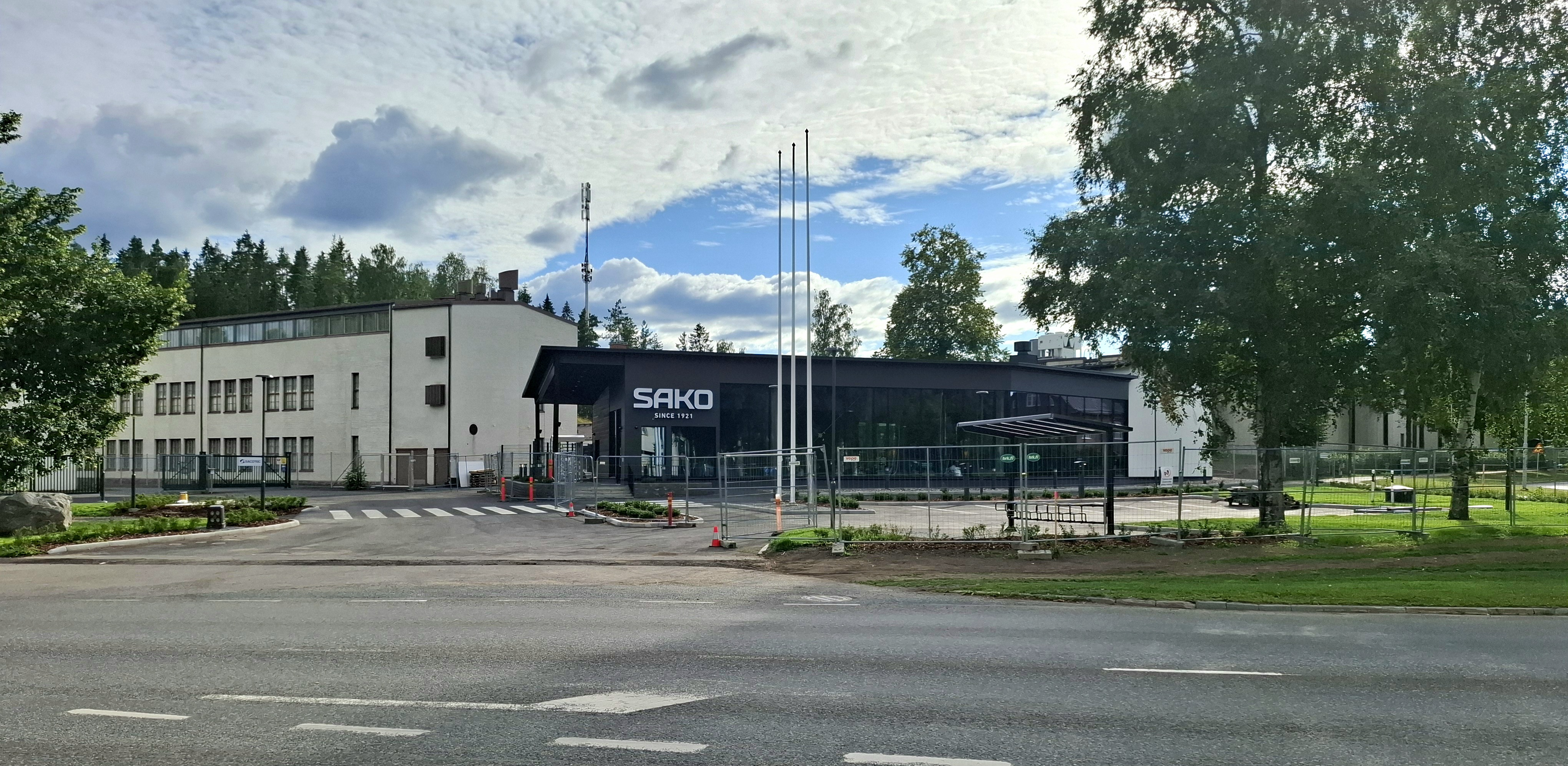
Sako's facilities in Riihimäki, Finland.

Sako Limited (natively Sako Oy) is a Finnish firearm and ammunition manufacturer located in Riihimäki, Kanta-Häme in southern Finland. It also has owned the Tikka brand of bolt-action rifles since 1983, and is now owned by the Italian firearm holding company Beretta Holding. The name Sako comes from the company's former name Suojeluskuntain Ase- ja Konepaja Oy (lit. 'Civil Guard Gun and Machining Works Ltd').

== History ==
In 1919, two years after Finland declared independence from the Russian Empire, the Suojeluskuntain Yliesikunnan Asepaja (Civil Guard Supreme Staff Gun Works) opened in a former Helsinki brewery to repair private arms and recondition Russian military rifles for Finnish service. The rifle repair shop became financially independent of the civil guard in 1921. The Suojeluskuntain Yliesikunnan Asepaja moved from Helsinki to an ammunition factory in Riihimäki on 1 June 1927, and reorganized as SAKO in the 1930s. Sako started exporting pistol cartridges to Sweden in the 1930s and continued manufacturing submachine gun cartridges through World War II.

Another Finnish firearms manufacturer Tikkakoski, which owned the Tikka brand, was merged into SAKO in 1983. In 1986, the arms manufacturing division of the government-owned Valmet conglomerate (which itself had been derived from the Valtion Kivääritehdas, VKT) was merged with Sako and called Sako-Valmet, with ownership split evenly between Nokia and Valmet. After further organizational shifts in state ownership, the company was sold to the Italian Beretta Holding in 2000.

== Post–World War II production ==
The first civilian rifle bearing the Sako name was the L42 (Luodikko [rifle] model 1942) chambered for the 7×33mm Sako cartridge, prototyped in 1942, and commercial production started after World War II. Sako developed the 7×33mm cartridge based on the 9×19mm Parabellum pistol cartridge, by making a longer case and "necking" the case down to 7 mm calibre (7.21 mm bullet diameter). This cartridge was designed for and well suited to capercaillie and black grouse hunting, a popular sport in Finland, Sweden and Norway. The L46 was later denoted L461 "Vixen". The L461 has been very popular in Finland and Sweden, especially chambered for the .222 Remington cartridge and has a great reputation among aficionados.

In 1957, Sako launched a longer action, the L57, subsequently renamed L579 "Forester". This is a "medium action" intended for the .308 Winchester and similar cartridges.

In 1961, Sako introduced the L61R "Finnbear" for long cartridges like the .30-06 and 6.5×55mm.

Between 1959 and 1974, Sako produced a lever-action gun, the Sako Finnwolf, in .243 Winchester and .308 Winchester.

Between 1976 and 1988, Sako produced an autoloading match pistol, the ".22-32", then ".22-32 New Model", then "Triace", three versions of the same handgun, slightly modified. It was chambered for .22 Short, .22 Long Rifle and .32 Smith & Wesson Wadcutter, with conversions (barrels, slides and magazines) for each caliber. It is suitable for ISSF (then "UIT") sport pistol events (Rapid Fire Pistol, Standard Pistol, 25m Pistol, and Centerfire Pistol events. It can be used for 50m Free pistol).

Sako has also produced a number of rimfire rifles, among them are the P72 Finnscout, M78, Finnfire, Quad and Finnfire II. The M78 was also chambered for the .22 Hornet and the .22 WMR in addition to the .22 Long Rifle.

During the 1980s (1987), Sako started using the AI/AII/AV designations (previously used for models imported to the US) for the three action lengths in Europe. The complete rifles were still designated L461/L579/L61. The bolt was given a slight cosmetic makeover, with the hammer covered by a conical shell. This visual design was also used on the later models (M4/5/691, M75, M85).

The L579 could be delivered with detachable magazine although the default was a hinged floorplate.

From 1987 to 1992, a version of the short (Vixen) action was produced for the .22 PPC and 6mm PPC cartridges, when Sako introduced these former wildcat cartridges as commercial cartridges, denoted ".22 PPC USA" and "6mm PPC USA" to avoid confusion with the specialized bench rest cartridges which required a "tight neck" chamber. These actions are the same external dimensions, and have the same bolt diameter as the 222 Remington, 222 Rem. Magnum, 223 Rem. cartridge actions. Only the bolt face recess was enlarged to suit the PPC case.

In 1992, the first of the "newer" Sakos, the 591, was introduced as a replacement for the L579. Shortly after, the 491 and the 691 were launched. These rifles (491/591/691) are not as highly regarded as the L461/L579/L61R and according to folklore, the quality of the workmanship is slightly inferior for the 491/591/691. They featured a separate recoil lug, also found on the 75, and a Tikka trigger assembly. However, these rifles were available in left-hand configuration both as a medium action (591) and long action (691)

In 1997, Sako launched the 75, named for Sako's 75th anniversary. The 75 was externally similar to previous Sako models, but the construction was radically different featuring three symmetrical locking lugs and a detachable magazine.

Before the 75, Sako hunting rifles (except the L46 and the L579) did not have detachable magazines, but a hinged floorplate with the lock placed on the front of the trigger guard.

Sako's latest (and current) model, the M85, was introduced in 2006. In 2020, S20 was released.

== Current production ==
Including the new Sako 90 and 100 series. Updated August 2024.

=== Sako brand ===
- Sako S20 — A modular "hybrid" rifle with aluminium bedding chassis and interchangeable furnitures (buttstock/grip and fore-end)
- Sako 85 — Sako's premium-line bolt-action centerfire hunting rifle, available in many configurations and calibres from .204 Ruger through to .416 RM
- Sako A7 — Sako's mid-price-range hunting rifle, filling the gap between the Sako 85 premium line and the Tikka T3x value line hunting rifles. The A7 combines different features from the Sako 85 and the Tikka T3, along with a unique in-line detachable magazine design, and is currently (2010) available only with a synthetic stock, in combination with either a blued chromoly or stainless steel barrelled action.
- Sako TRG — A long-range sniper rifle geared toward law enforcement and military use
- Sako Quad — A rimfire rifle, available in a variety of configurations with interchangeable barrels in .17 HMR, .17 HM2, .22 LR and .22 WMR calibres
- Sako Finnfire II — A rimfire rifle available in .17 HMR and .22 LR calibres
- Sako ARG - A family of AR-15-style rifles for military and law enforcement.

=== Tikka brand ===
- Tikka T3x — Sako's budget-range centerfire hunting rifle, available in calibres from .204 Ruger to .338 WM
- Tikka T1x MTR — A "multi-task rimfire" rifle with the same receiver footprint as the T3x, introduced in 2018, available in .17 HMR and .22 LR calibres

== Sako model history (Europe) ==
Introduced	Model	Chambered for	Comments
1942	L42	7×33mm Sako	
1946	L46	5.6×35mmR, .22 Hornet, .218 Bee, .222 Rem, .222 Rem Mag, .25-20 Win, 7×33mm Sako, .32-20 Win	Detachable magazine
1954?	P54/P54T	.22 LR	
195?	M98	.270 Win, .30-06, .300 H&H, 8×60mm, 9.3×62mm, .375 H&H	FN M98 action, Sako stock and barrel
1957	L57	.243 Win, .244 Rem, .308 Win	Fixed magazine
1959	L579 Forester	.22-250, .243 Win, .244 Rem, .308 Win	Fixed magazine, later in production detachable as option
1961	L461 Vixen	.17 Rem, .222 Rem, .222 Rem Mag, .223 Rem	Fixed magazine
1961	L61R Finnbear	.264 Win, .270 Win, 30-06	Three locking lugs: Two in front and one on the rear end of the bolt
1961	L61R Finnbear Magnum	7mm Rem Mag, .300 Win Mag, .300 H&H, .338 Win Mag, .375 H&H	Three locking lugs: two in front and one on the rear end of the bolt
1963	VL63 Finnwolf	.243 Win, .244 Rem, .308 Win, .358 Win	Lever-action, rotating bolt with three locking lugs
1972	L61R Finnbear	.25-06 Rem, 6.5×55mm, .270 Win, 7×64mm, .30-06, 9.3×62mm	Two locking lugs in front
1972	L61R Finnbear Magnum	7mm Rem Mag, .300 Win Mag, .338 Win Mag, .375 H&H	Two locking lugs in front
1972	P72 Finnscout	.22 LR, .22 WMR	
1974?	Sako M74 Super	.222 Rem, .223 Rem, .22-250, .243 Win, .308 Win, .25-06, .270 Win, .30-06, .264 Mag, 7mm Rem Mag, .300 Win Mag, .300 H&H, .338 Win Mag, .375 H&H	
1975	P75	.22 Hornet	
1978	M78 Finnscout	.22 LR, .22 WMR, .22 Hornet	
1979/80	AI/L461	.17 Rem, .222 Rem, .223 Rem	Also available as single-shot action
1987	AI/L461 PPC	.22 PPC USA, 6mm PPC USA	Also available as single-shot action
1979/80	AII/L579	.22-250 Rem, .243 Win, 7mm-08, .308 Win	Also available as single-shot action
1979/80	AIII		Early version of the AV, short tang
1979/80	AIV		
1979/80	AV/L61R	.25-06 Rem, 6.5×55, .270 Win, 7×64, .30-06, 9.3×62mm	Long tang
1979/80	AV Mag/L61R Magnum	7mm Rem Mag, .300 Win Mag, .300 Wby, .338 Win Mag, .375 H&H, .416 Rem Mag	.458 Win Mag has been produced on special order
1982?	VL63 Finnwolf Sako Collectors Association	.243 Win, .308 Win	Lever-action
1988	M579 SM (Super Match)	.308 Win	
1989	TRG-21	.308 Win	Three locking lugs in front, detachable magazine
1989	TRG-41	.338 Lapua Mag	Three locking lugs in front, detachable magazine
1992	M591 Left hand	.22-250, .243 Win, 7mm-08 Rem, .308 Win	
1992	M995 TRG-S	.25-06 Rem, 6.5×55, .270 Win, .280 Rem, 7×64, .308 Win, .30-06 Spr, 9.3×62	Three locking lugs in front, detachable magazine, .473" bolt face
1992	M995 TRG-S Magnum	.270 Wby, 7mm Rem Mag, 7mm Wby, 7mm STW, .300 Win Mag, .300 Wby, .338 Win Mag, .340 Wby, .375 H&H, .416 Rem Mag	Three locking lugs in front, detachable magazine, .532" bolt face
1992	M995 TRG-S Super Magnum	7.21 Firebird, 7.82 Warbird, .30-378 Wby, .338 Lapua Magnum	Three locking lugs in front, detachable magazine, .590" bolt face
1993	S491	.17 Rem, .222 Rem, .223 Rem, .22 PPC USA, 6mm PPC USA	
1993	M591	.22-250, .243 Win, 7mm-08 Rem, .308 Win	
1993	L691	.25-06, 6.5×55mm, .270 Win, 7×64, .280 Rem, .30-06, 9.3×62mm	
1993	L691 Mag	.270 Wby, 7mm Rem Mag, 7mm Wby, .300 Win Mag, .300 Wby, .338 Win Mag, .340 Wby, .375 H&H, .416 Rem Mag	
1997	Sako 75 I	.222 Rem, .223 Rem	Three locking lugs in front, detachable magazine
1997	Sako 75 III	.22 PPC USA, 6mm PPC USA	Three locking lugs in front, detachable magazine
1997	Sako 75 III	.22-250, .243 Win, .260 Rem, 7mm-08 Rem, .308 Win	Three locking lugs in front, detachable magazine
1997	Sako 75 SM	.270 WSM, .300WSM	Three locking lugs in front, detachable magazine
1997	Sako 75 IV	.25-06, 6.5×55mm, .270 Win, 7×64mm, .30-06, 9.3×62, 9.3×66mm Sako	Three locking lugs in front, detachable magazine
1997	Sako 75 V	7mm Rem Mag, .300 Win Mag, .375 H&H, .416 Rem Mag	Three locking lugs in front, detachable magazine
1999	TRG-22	.260 Rem, .308 Win	Three locking lugs in front, detachable magazine
1999	TRG-42	.300 Win Mag, .338 Lapua Mag	Three locking lugs in front, detachable magazine
2001	Sako 75 V Safari anniversary model	.375 H&H	Three locking lugs in front, detachable magazine
2001	Sako Finnfire (P94S)	.22 LR	
2006?	Sako Quad	.17 Mach 2, .17 HMR, .22 LR, .22 WMR	Interchangeable barrels
2006	Sako 85 XS	.204 Ruger, .222 Remington, .223 Remington	Three locking lugs in front, detachable magazine
2006	Sako 85 S	.22-250, .243 Win, .260 Rem, 7mm-08 Rem, .308 Win, .338 Federal	Three locking lugs in front, detachable magazine
2006	Sako 85 SM	.270 WSM, 7mm WSM, .300 WSM	Three locking lugs in front, detachable magazine
2006	Sako 85 M	.25-06, 6.5×55mm, .270 Win, 7×64mm, .30-06, 9.3×62mm, 9.3×66mm Sako	Three locking lugs in front, detachable magazine
2006	Sako 85 L	7mm Rem Mag, .300 Win Mag, .338 Win Mag, .375 H&H Mag	Three locking lugs in front, detachable magazine
2011	Sako TRG M10	.308 Win, .300 Win Mag, .338 Lapua Mag	User configurable multi caliber modular sniper system
2014	Sako Finnfire II	.17 HMR, .22 LR	
2020	Sako S20	.243 Win, 6.5 CM, 6.5 PRC, 7mm Rem Mag, .308 Win, .30-06, .300 Win Mag	Three locking lugs in front, detachable magazine
2023	Sako 90	.243 Win, 6.5 CM, 6.5 PRC, 7mm Rem Mag, .308 Win, .30-06, .300 Win Mag	Updated Sako 85, Three locking lugs in front, detachable magazine
2024	Sako TRG 62 A1	9.5×77 mm	

=== Models ===
Models A-series actions
	L461/AI	L461/AI PPC	L579/AII	L61R/AV	L61R Mag/AV Mag
Hunter	X	X	X	X	X
Deluxe	X		X	X	X
Super Deluxe	X		X	X	X
Laminated	X		X	X	X
Varmint	X	X	X		
Target	X	X	X		
Carbine			X	X	X
Handy			X	X	
Handy Fiber				X	
Battue			X	X	X
Classic			X	X	X
Fiberclass				X	X
Safari					X

Models 4/5/691 series actions
Hunter, Deluxe, Super Deluxe, Laminated, Varmint, Carbine, Classic

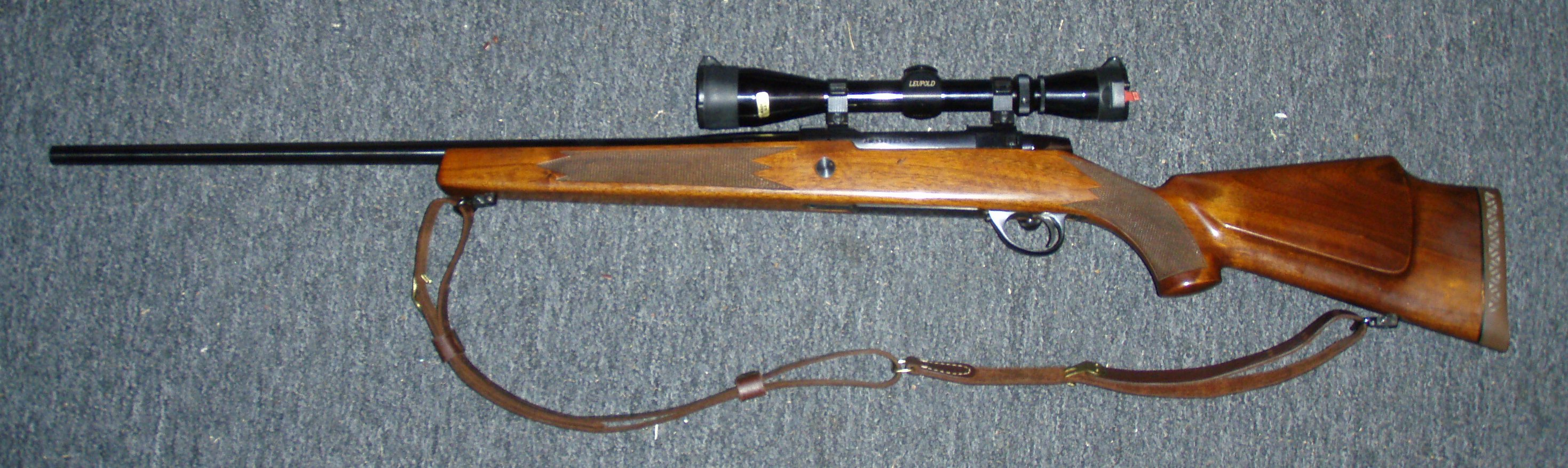
Sako Rifle in .25-06

Models M75 series actions
	I (Short)	III (Medium)	SM (Short magnum)	IV (Long)	V (Magnum)
Hunter	X	X	X	X	X
Hunter Stainless	X	X		X	X
Hunter left hand				X	
Laminated stainless	X	X	X	X	X
Deluxe	X	X	X	X	X
Synthetic stainless		X	X	X	X
Finnlight		X	X	X	X
Varmint	X	X		X	
Varmint Laminated Stainless	X	X			

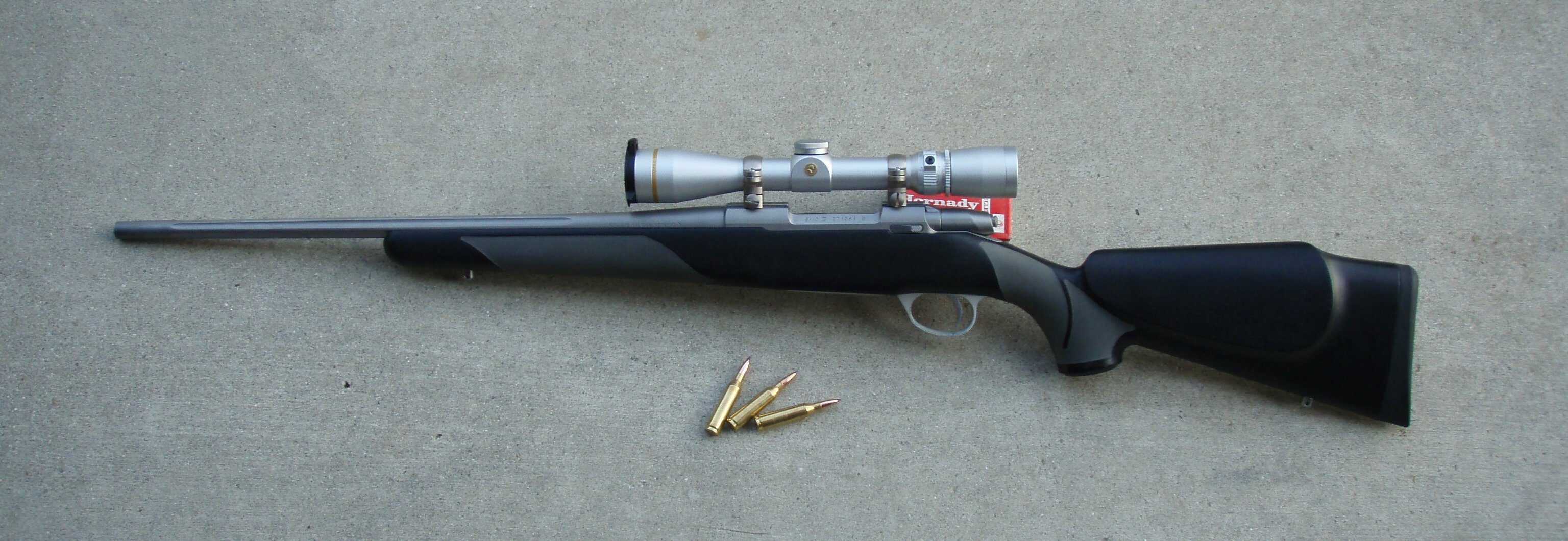
Sako Finnlight in .243 Winchester

Models M85 series actions
Hunter, Laminated Stainless, Stainless, Synthetic Stainless, Finnlight, Bavarian, Bavarian Carbine, Varmint, Brown Bear, Black Bear, Kodiak, Grizzly, Long range, Varmint Stainless Synthetic Black, Carbonlight, Classic Deluxe, Deluxe, Safari, Black Wolf, Finnlight ǁ, Carbon Wolf, Safari 90th Anniversary
