= RKK =

RKK may refer to:

== Groups, organizations ==
- RKK Energia (Russian: Ракетно-космическая корпорация «Энергия» им. С. П. Королёва, romanized: Raketno-kosmicheskaya korporatsiya «Energiya» im. S. P. Korolova, lit. 'S.P. Korolev Rocket and Space Corporation Energia'), a Russian manufacturer of spacecraft and space station components
- Sweet Scent of Service (RKK; 2006–2011; Persian: ائتلاف رايحه خوش خدمت, romanized: Etelaf Rayheh Khosh Khodamat), a conservative political group in Iran that supported president Mahmoud Ahmadinejad and his government
- Reichskommissariat Kaukasien (RKK; 1942–1943; German: Reich Commissariat Caucasus), military occupation command planned for the Caucasus region by Germany in WWII; planning and preparation started but no occupation occurred
- Reichskulturkammer (RKK; 1933–1945; German: Reich Chamber of Culture), German government agency
- Revi Karunakaran Memorial Museum (RKK Museum), Alappuzha, Kerala, India; a private art museum
- Ring Ka King, a pro-wrestling promotion in India
- Risshō Kōsei Kai, a Japanese religious movement with an emphasis on the Lotus Sutra
- Rooms-Katholiek Kerkgenootschap (RKK; Dutch: Roman Catholic Church Association), a broadcaster in the Netherlands
- Rotterdamse Kunstkring (RKK), an artists association in Rotterdam, Netherlands
- Runda Kumpulan Kecil, an insurgent group in Southern Thailand
- RKK Kumamoto Broadcasting, a radio and television broadcaster in Kumamoto Prefecture, Japan

== People ==
- Revi Karunakaran (1931–2003), Indian businessman
- Robert Kenneth Kraft (born 1941), American businessman

== Other uses ==
- RKK Line, a ferry line operating out of Kagoshima, Japan

== See also ==
- The dictionary definition of РКК at Wiktionary
- RK2 plasmid
- R2K
- RRK (disambiguation)
- RK (disambiguation)
