= KK 62 =

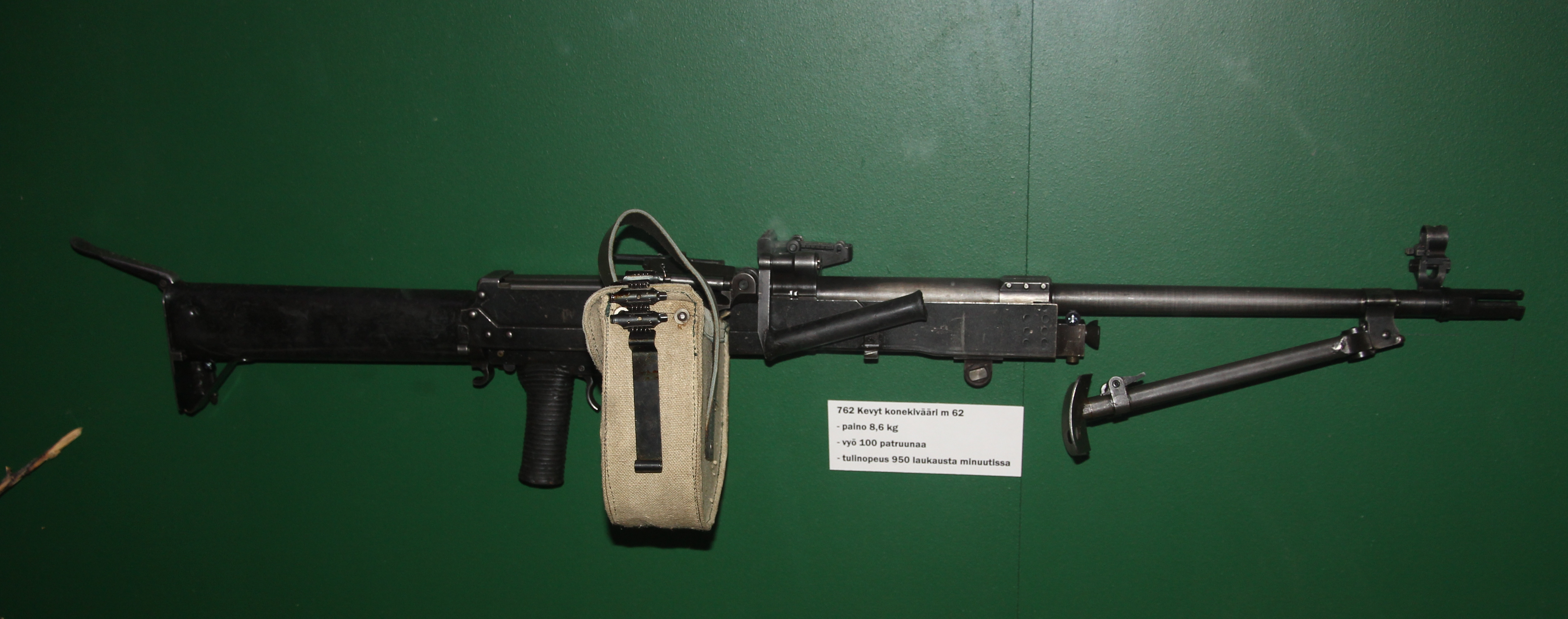
- Valmet KK 62 light machine gun.
- Type: Light machine gun
- Place of origin: Finland

Service history
- In service: 1962–present
- Used by: Finnish Defence Forces

Production history
- Designer: Valmet
- Designed: 1950s
- Manufacturer: Valmet
- No. built: 6,500

Specifications
- Mass: 8.5 kg (18.74 lb)
- Length: 1,085 mm (42.7 in)
- Barrel length: 470 mm (18.5 in)
- Cartridge: 7.62×39mm
- Action: Gas-operated, tilting breechblock
- Rate of fire: 1,000–1,100 rounds/min
- Feed system: 100-round belt in detachable cloth container
- Sights: Iron sights

The KK 62 (from Finnish konekivääri 62, 'machine gun 62'), officially 7.62 KK 62 (previously also 7.62 KvKK 62, from Finnish kevyt konekivääri, 'light machine gun') and colloquially KVKK or KVKK 62, is a Finnish 7.62×39mm light machine gun designed in late 1950s with the first prototype ready for testing in 1960. It was officially adopted as the standard infantry support weapon of the Finnish Defence Forces (FDF) in 1962 as the 7.62 konekivääri 62; the first weapons were delivered in 1966. It remains in service, although a replacement has already entered use, namely the PKM general-purpose machine gun.

== Design details ==
The KK 62 is a gas-operated, belt-fed automatic weapon. It fires from an open bolt, and uses a tilting bolt that locks by protrusions in recesses of the side walls of the receiver. The overall system of operation is modeled on that found in the Czech LK vz. 52/57 machine gun. The KK 62's receiver is machined from steel, and a tubular metal buttstock houses the recoil spring. To facilitate shooting with heavy mittens, there is no trigger guard. A substantial vertical bar in front of the trigger is used for pulling the trigger/handgrip assembly and bolt back when loading.

The KK 62 is fed from the right-hand side, from 100-round belts that are carried in pouches that clamp onto the receiver wall. The KK 62 has no quick-change barrel, which is a serious drawback when sustained firepower is required; the original usage doctrine was based on agile hit-and-run tactics rather than suppressive fire from a strong position. The cleaning rod is attached to the right side of the butt and receiver. A side-folding carrying handle is provided in front of the feeding mechanism. The KK 62 is also equipped with a folding bipod.

The KK 62 uses the intermediate Soviet 7.62×39mm M43 cartridge, which can be interchanged with any FDF standard assault rifles (from RK 62 to RK 95 TP). The major drawbacks are the lack of a quick-change barrel and sensitivity to dirt and humidity—the KK 62 requires much more care in a combat environment than most FDF assault rifles.

== Variants ==
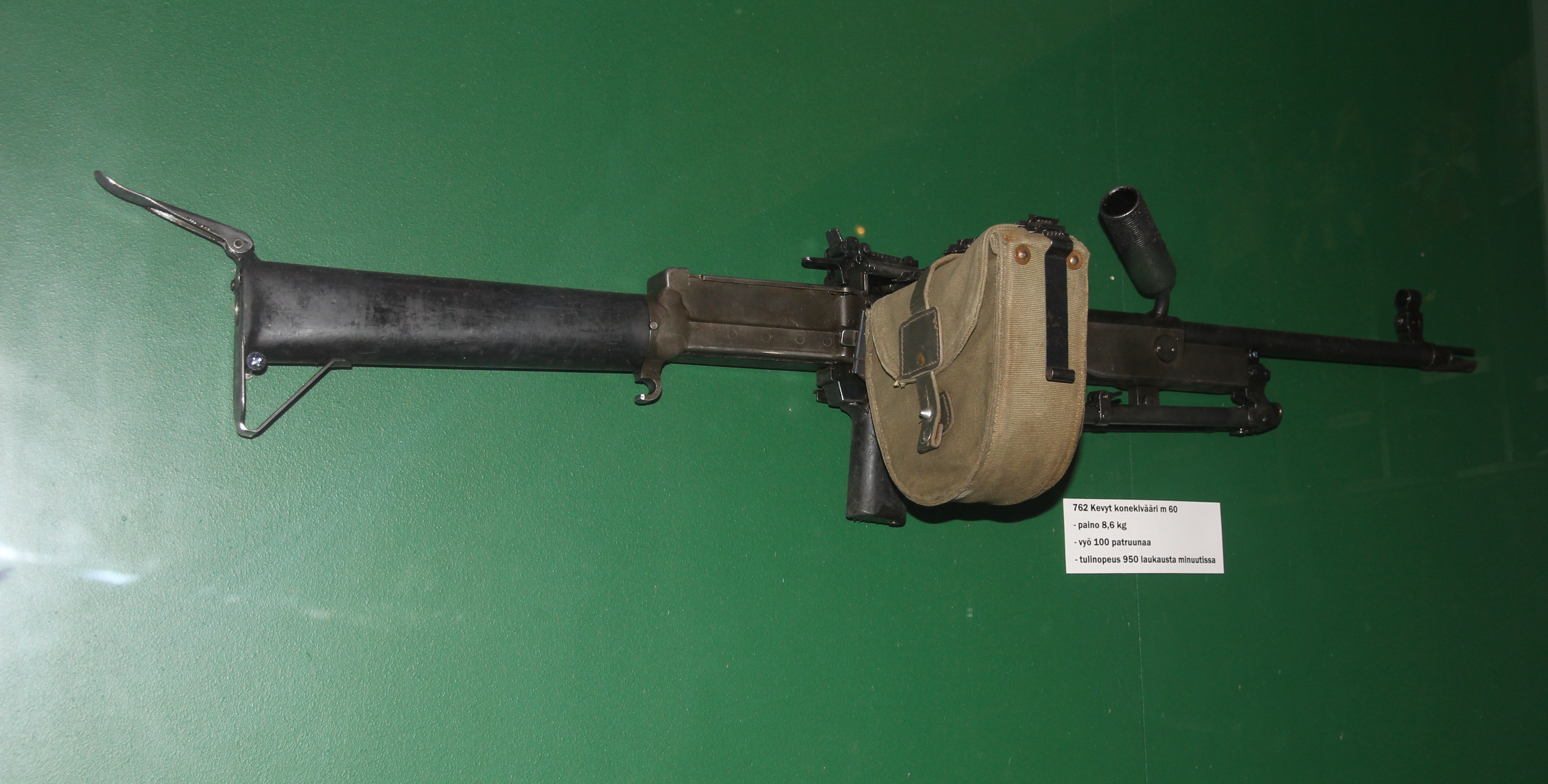
KVKK 60 IP VS (m/60 D) prototype.

- kvkk m/58 - initial custom prototypes based on the Czechoslovak vz. 52-57 machine gun.
  - kvkk m/58 A - first Valmet-made prototype based on the exact action of the Czechoslovak vz. 52-57 machine gun and FDF requirements, but without the magazine feed option due to manufacturing limitations.
  - kvkk m/58 B - Valmet modification more suitable for mass production, with a fixed barrel and both belt and magazine feed for AK-47 type magazines.
- KVKK 60 - prototype batch of 50 machine guns for field trials.
  - KVKK 60 KP VS LS (Valmet production name m/60 A) - variant with a fixed barrel, belt and magazine feed.
  - KVKK 60 IP VS LS (Valmet production name m/60 B) - variant with a quick change barrel, belt and magazine feed.
  - KVKK 60 KP VS (Valmet production name m/60 C) - variant with a fixed barrel and only belt feed.
  - KVKK 60 IP VS (Valmet production name m/60 D) - variant with a quick change barrel and only belt feed.
- KVKK 62 pre-production batch - based on the KVKK 60 KP VS (m/60 C). Its receiver suffered from durability issues; out of the 30 pre-production machine guns, 2 had an improved, reinforced receiver installed.
- KK 62 (also KVKK 62)- production variant of the KK 62, based on the KVKK 62 pre-production series with the improved receiver.
  - KK 62 late production variant with modernised night sights.

== Users ==
- Finland
- Qatar
