= Valmet M82 =

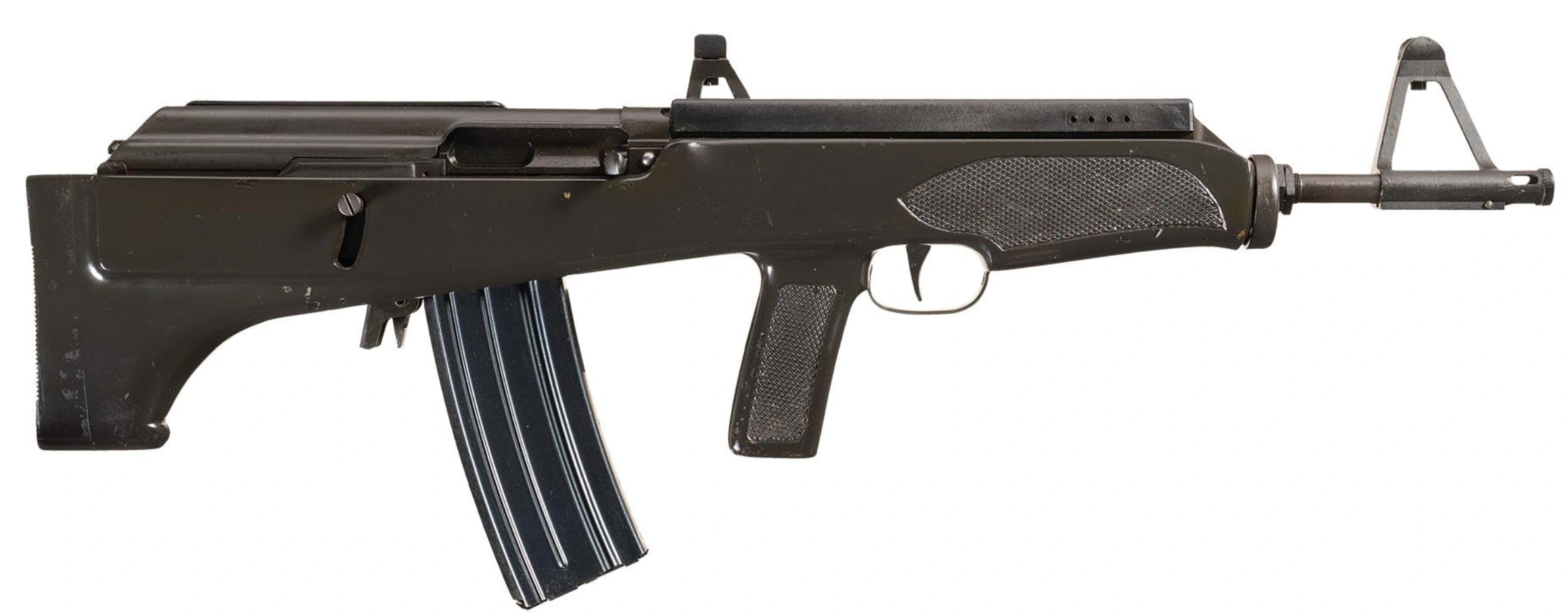
- A Valmet M82
- Type: Bullpup assault rifle
- Place of origin: Finland

Production history
- Designer: Valmet
- Manufacturer: Valmet
- Produced: 1978–1986
- No. built: Approx. 2000

Specifications
- Mass: 3.3 kg
- Length: 710 mm
- Barrel length: 415 mm
- Cartridge: 5.56×45mm NATO; 7.62×39mm
- Action: Gas-operated, rotating bolt
- Rate of fire: 750 rounds/min
- Feed system: 30-round detachable box magazine
- Sights: Iron sights

The Valmet M82 is a bullpup assault rifle with a Valmet RK 62 76 internal design created by Finnish company Valmet.

== History ==
The M82 was introduced in Finland in 1978 and discontinued production in 1986. Only around 2,000 were manufactured, mostly as semi-automatic versions in 5.56 mm NATO caliber for ODIN International Ltd. of Alexandria, Virginia. A few samples were issued to Finnish Army paratroopers, but the rifle was found to be unsuitable as a service weapon. One issue that cropped up during its short service life was that the rear sight of an uncased rifle had a tendency to hit the lower face, nose and cheekbones of the paratrooper during landing. The rifle was also poorly balanced, as nearly all the weight was in the rear.

== Technical data ==
It is chambered for 5.56×45mm NATO caliber as model 255 470 and for 7.62×39mm caliber as model 255 490. It has a Valmet RK 62 76 receiver, which is made from stamped and riveted sheet metal, constructed inside urethane stock. The trigger of the weapon is polymer to prevent heat of the barrel conducting to it, as the trigger is mounted to the barrel of the gun.

== Features ==
The M82 features an unusual sight arrangement. The front and rear sights, similar to a Bren light machine gun or some other belt fed machineguns, are offset to the left. The sights are aligned normally with the right eye, but are offset from the barrel about 3.175 cm. This results in the rifles windage being accurate for the zeroed range only. Shots taken at closer ranges to zero will hit to the right of the target and shots taken at longer ranges will hit to the left of the target. With the sight offset from the barrel by approximately 3.175 cm, if the rifles windage were zeroed at 50 meters, at 100 meters' distance the windage error would be about 3.175 cm and at 200 meters' distance the windage error would be 9.575 cm. This results in a margin of error making shots over 300 meters difficult. Since the fixed sights do not allow for any elevation adjustment, it is clear that this weapon is meant for combat accuracy (15.24 cm at 100 meters) at short/urban ranges only and not meant to be a precision sniping tool.

The offset sight arrangement and right side ejection mean that this weapon is very difficult to use for left-handed users. Modern bullpups have eliminated this drawback by using centrally-aligned optics and either forward, downward or rearward ejection to allow ambidextrous use in combat situations.

== See also ==
- List of assault rifles
- List of bullpup firearms
