= RK =

RK may refer to:

== Science and technology ==
- Radial keratotomy, a surgical procedure on the eye
- Rhodopsin kinase, an enzyme
- r/K selection theory, in biology, relating to the trade-off between quantity and quality of offspring
- Runge–Kutta methods, in numerical analysis

== Airlines ==
- Royal Khmer Airlines (former IATA code: RK), ceased operations 2007
- R Airlines (former IATA code: RK), ceased operations 2018
- Ryanair UK (IATA code: RK), UK based subsidiary airline of Ryanair

== Other uses ==
- Radha Krishnan Chidambaram, Indian actor and producer, known as RK
- Raising Kaine, a defunct political blog in Virginia, US
- Reichskommissariat, a historical Nazi territorial division in Europe
- Rangkasbitung railway station, station code RK, Indonesia
- Ridwan Kamil, former governor of West Java province, Indonesia

== See also ==
- RK (RynnäkköKivääri), Finnish assault rifles; for example RK 62
- Republic of Korea (ROK)
- Republic of Kazakhstan
