= Revi Karunakaran =

Indian businessman (1931 - 2003)

- Born: 22 November 1931; Alleppey, India
- Died: 25 November 2003 (aged 72); Ernakulam, India
- Occupation: Businessman

Revi Karunakaran (22 November 1931 – 25 November 2003) was an Indian businessman and coir exporter from Kerala. He served as a chairman and managing director of the Karan Group of Companies, which became one of the world's largest exporters of coir products. Karunakaran played a role in modernizing India's coir industry and was a director of the Industrial Development Bank of India (IDBI). In 2006, his wife Betty Karan built the Revi Karunakaran Memorial Museum (RKK Museum) in his memory.

== Early life and education ==
Revi Karunakaran was born in Alleppey (formerly Travancore state) on 22 November 1931 into an upper class family. He was the son of K.C. Karunakaran, an industrialist who graduated from Heidelberg University, Germany, and Margret, a German National from wealthy family. His grandfather Krishnan Muthalaly was the first Indian to establish a handloom factory to export coir products, which had been a monopoly of European companies until then.

Karunakaran completed his early education in Surrey, UK, and later attended high school in Lausanne, Switzerland. He later graduated with a degree in Business Administration from Babson College, MA, USA. Karunakaran was a polyglot and fluent in several languages, including German, French, English, Italian, Spanish, Dutch, and Malayalam.

== Life as entrepreneur ==
After his father's death in 1952, Karunakaran assumed leadership of the Karan group at the age of 20. He was the chairman of the Karan Group, which includes companies such as Kerala Balers, Alleppey Company, and William Goodacre & Sons, all leading coir export houses.

Karunakaran participated in trade delegations and represented India at International forums, including the Food and Agriculture Organization (FAO) and UNCTAD. He served as a consultant for FAO for three years as a consultant on hard fibers and participated in the Tariff Negotiations with the European Economic Community countries.

== Revi Karunakaran Memorial Museum ==
The Revi Karunakaran Memorial Museum is a privately owned museum established in 2006 by Karunakaran's wife Betty, located in Alappuzha, Kerala, holding one of the world's largest private collections of Swarovski crystals, along with porcelain, jade, ivory, and Tanjore paintings. The museum spans 28,000 square feet and showcases elements from Hinduism, Christianity, Islam, and Buddhism in its design and displays. The third phase of the museum was inaugurated in 2015 by Chandrika Bandaranaike Kumaratunga, former president of Sri Lanka.

== Death ==
Karunakaran died on 25 November 2003 at a hospital in Ernakulam. His body was cremated on the premises of Santhi Bhavan, his home in Alappuzha, on the same day.
