= Revi Karunakaran Memorial Museum =

Private museum in Kerala, India

Coordinates: 9.499180°N 76.328827°E

The Revi Karunakaran Museum

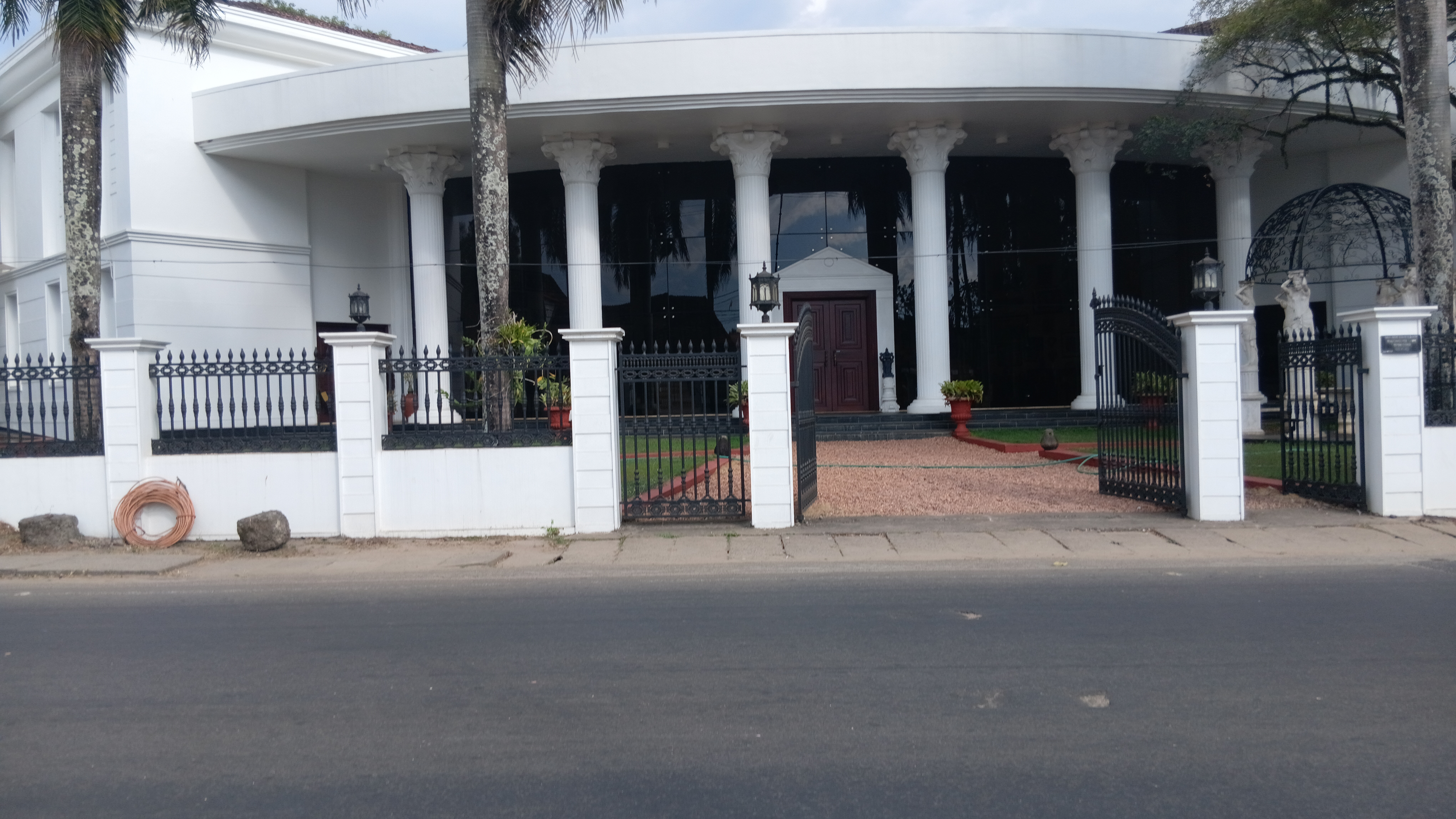
Ravi Karunakaran Memorial Museum, Alappuzha

The Revi Karunakaran Memorial Museum is a privately owned museum located in Alappuzha, Kerala, in southern India. It is named in memory of Revi Karunakaran.

== The Museum ==
In 2003, it was built by Betty Karan in memory of her husband, the coir industrialist Revi Karunakaran. It holds one of the largest private collections of Swarovski crystals in the world along with porcelain, jade, ivory, Keralan artifacts, furniture, and Tanjore paintings.

The museum was inaugurated on 22 November 2006 by the former governor of Meghalaya M.M. Jacob. The third phase of the museum was inaugurated on 22 November 2015 by Chandrika Bandaranaike Kumaratunga, the fifth President of Sri Lanka.

== See also ==
- List of museums in India
