= RK 62 =

Finnish assault rifle

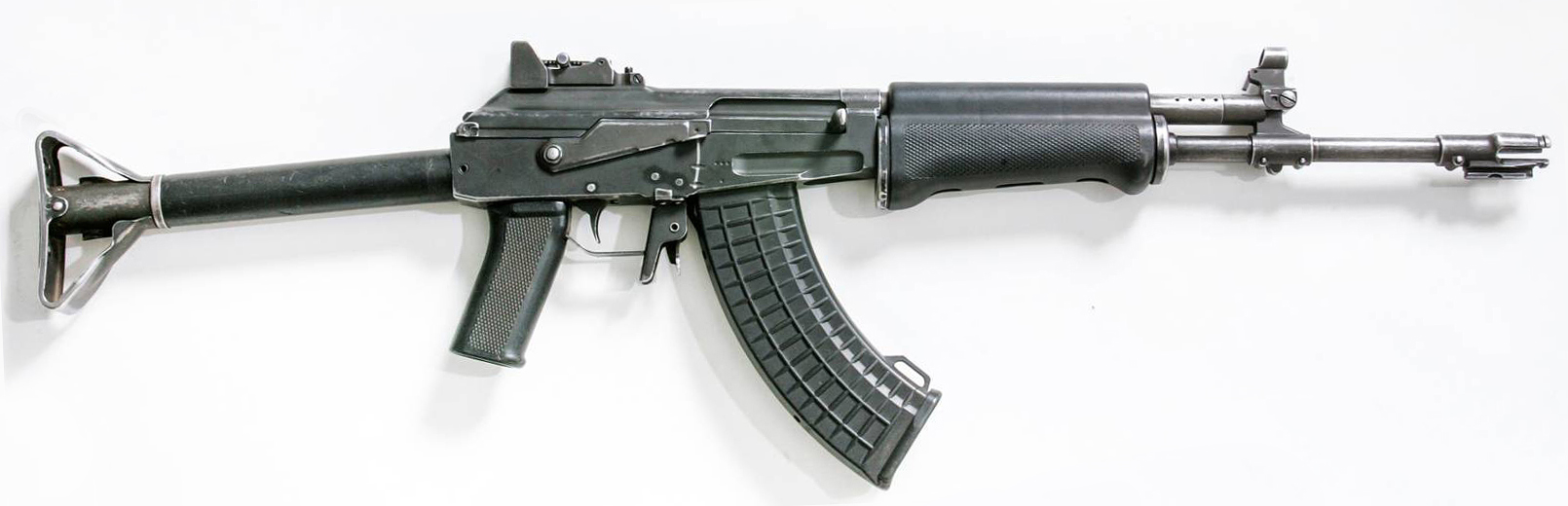
- RK 62
- Type: Assault rifle
- Place of origin: Finland

Service history
- In service: 1965–present
- Used by: See Users
- Wars: War in Afghanistan

Production history
- Designer: Lauri Oksanen; Valmet
- Designed: 1962
- Manufacturer: Valmet, SAKO
- Produced: 1965–1994
- No. built: 350,000+
- Variants: RK 95 TP

Specifications
- Mass: 3.5 kg (7.7 lb) empty (RK 62); 3.27 kg (7.2 lb) empty (RK 62 76)
- Length: 940 mm (37 in) with fixed or extended stock / 710 mm (28 in) with stock folded
- Barrel length: 418 mm (16.5 in)
- Cartridge: 7.62×39mm (main); .222 Remington; .223 Remington/5.56×45mm NATO; .243 Winchester; .308 Winchester/7.62×51mm NATO; .30-06 Springfield; 7.62×53mmR (prototype only)
- Action: Gas-operated, rotating bolt
- Rate of fire: 700 rounds/min
- Muzzle velocity: 715 m/s (2,350 ft/s)
- Effective firing range: 300 m (980 ft)
- Feed system: 30-round detachable AK magazine
- Sights: Aperture rear sight on a sliding tangent with flip tritium night sight, forward hooded post, 470 mm (19 in) sight radius

The RK 62 (Finnish: Rynnäkkökivääri 62, lit. 'Assault rifle 62'), officially 7.62 RK 62 and commercially M62, is an assault rifle manufactured by Valmet and Sako. It is the standard issue infantry weapon of the Finnish Defence Forces (FDF).

== History ==
The development of a Finnish assault rifle in 7.62×39mm Soviet intermediary cartridge began in the 1950s. Various foreign models were looked at, the Soviet AK-47 being the most important.

The RK 62 was designed in 1957–1962 by a Valmet engineer Lauri Oksanen and is based on the Polish licensed version of the Soviet AK-47 design.

In October 2025, the Finnish Defence Forces announced that they intend to replace the RK 62 with a 5.56x45mm rifle by the end of the decade. The replacement is part of a plan to switch to NATO-standard calibres for all small arms in Finnish service.

== Design ==
The RK 62 uses the same 7.62×39mm cartridge as the AK-47. Between 1965 and 1994 350,000 M62 rifles were produced jointly by Valmet and Sako.

The RK 62 has a three-pronged flash suppressor, and a groove for a specially designed knife bayonet, which can be used alone as a combat knife.

One of the most distinctive features of the Valmet rifles, including the M62 and all subsequent variations, is the open-ended, three prong flash suppressor with a bayonet lug on its lower side. In addition to the flash suppression, the end can quickly cut barbed wire by pushing the muzzle onto a strand of wire and firing a round.

The biggest single improvement, apart from the metallurgical quality of the receiver and the overall quality of the barrel, are the sights: most AK variants have the rear sight mounted on top of the gas piston housing on top of the receiver. In the RK 62 the rear sight is mounted on the rear of the receiver cover with tritium illuminated night-sights. The sight radius is doubled enhancing the accuracy along with the hammer-forged match CM barrel.

This is apparent especially in its accuracy, as it can frequently achieve less than one minute of arc. The rifle uses a "peep" diopter sight, which is flipped over to reveal the open tritium enhanced rear night sight. The forward sight also has a mode for night operation. The gas tube is dove tailed into the front trunnion, and is a single-diameter tube, unlike the AK/AKM tube, which has a star-shaped cross-section to guide the piston while allowing gasses to vent behind it. The gas piston has a cog shaped ring on the stem, behind the piston head. The ring's diameter matches the tube diameter, and it acts as the guide within the gas tube, the notches on the ring allowing excess gasses to be vented behind the piston head/guide. This system reduces the number of parts, and simplifies manufacturing as well as assembly/disassembly. This design made its way into the IMI Galil. A port in the shoulder pad allows storing items (e.g. the cleaning kit) in the tubular buttstock.

All RK variants are designed to withstand the extreme environmental conditions of Northern Europe.

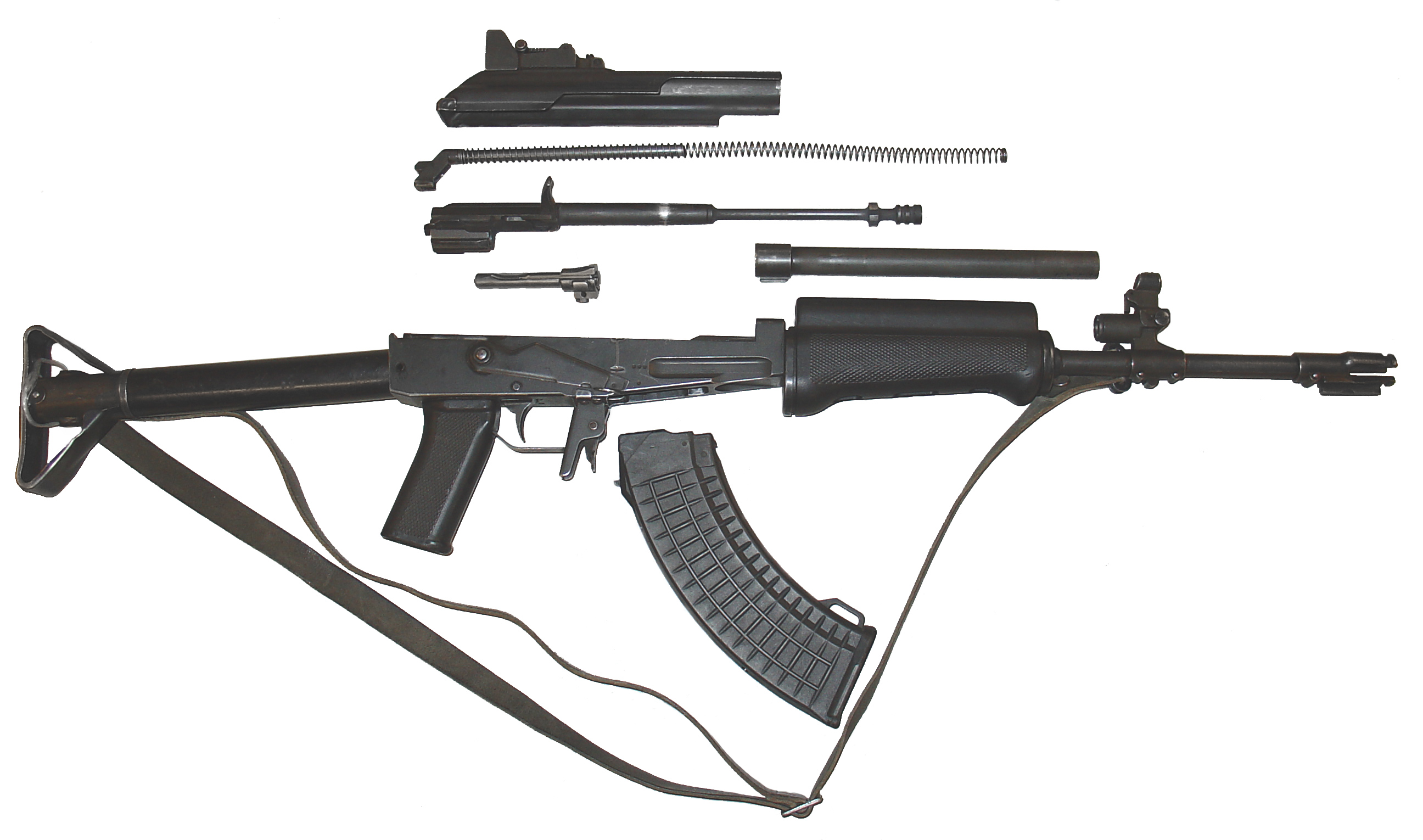
RK 62 field stripped

== Variants ==
=== Prototypes ===
==== m/58 ====
The very first prototype with which Valmet beat the Sako prototype in the competition for designing a locally produced Kalashnikov-pattern rifle.

The prototype had a wooden stock, pistol grip and handguard instead of the iconic tubular stock and plastic pistol grip and handguard.

==== RK 60 ====
The first factory production prototype.

The RK 62 was produced in 1960 at the Valmet factory in Tourula and was internally almost a copy of the AK-47.

It featured a metallic buttstock, a plastic handguard and pistol grip but lacked the trigger guard (it was hoped that it would make firing this weapon easier in cold Finnish winter when soldiers wore warm mittens).

The very first prototypes, closely modeled after Polish licence made AKs, had tinted birchwood stocks. After testing by the military, the RK 60 was slightly modified (trigger guard was reinstated) and adopted as the 7.62 RK 62.

The first variant included a hinged trigger guard and no muzzle device, second variant had an open trigger guard and an experimental muzzle brake, which was later on changed to the well-known three-pronged flash suppressor.

==== Unnamed short prototype ====
AKS-74U-inspired folding stock carbine prototype variant by the HQ Infantry Weapons Technical Department.

==== M/74 ====
FDF HQ Infantry Weapons Technical Department RPK-style prototype ratsuväen konekivääri ('Cavalry LMG'). Had a different sight layout with a KvKK 62 sight on top of the gas tube and front sight at the front end of the barrel, a conical flash suppressor, bipod and modified buttstock and handguard. Developed separately from the Valmet M78.

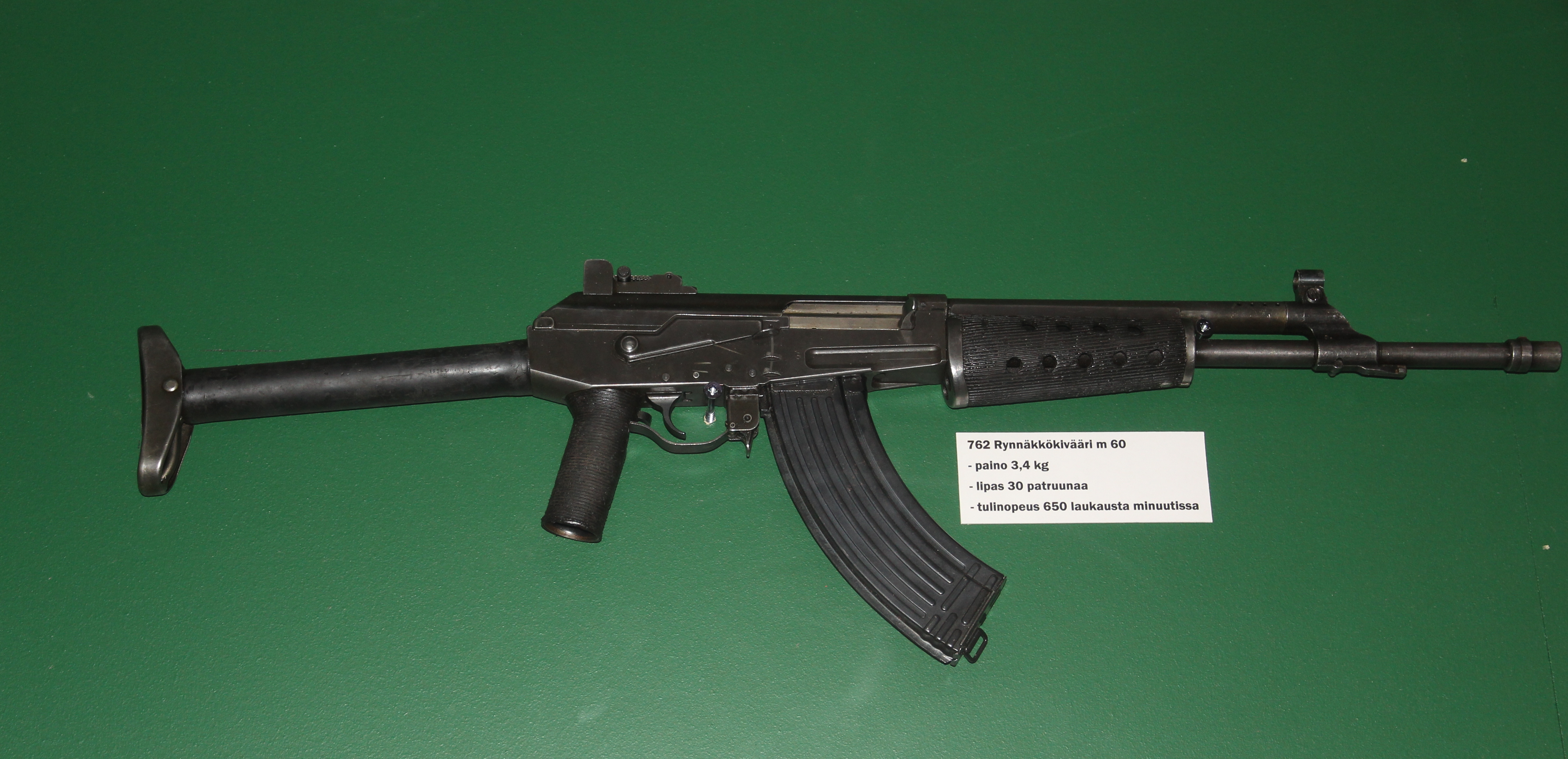
RK 60, first variant

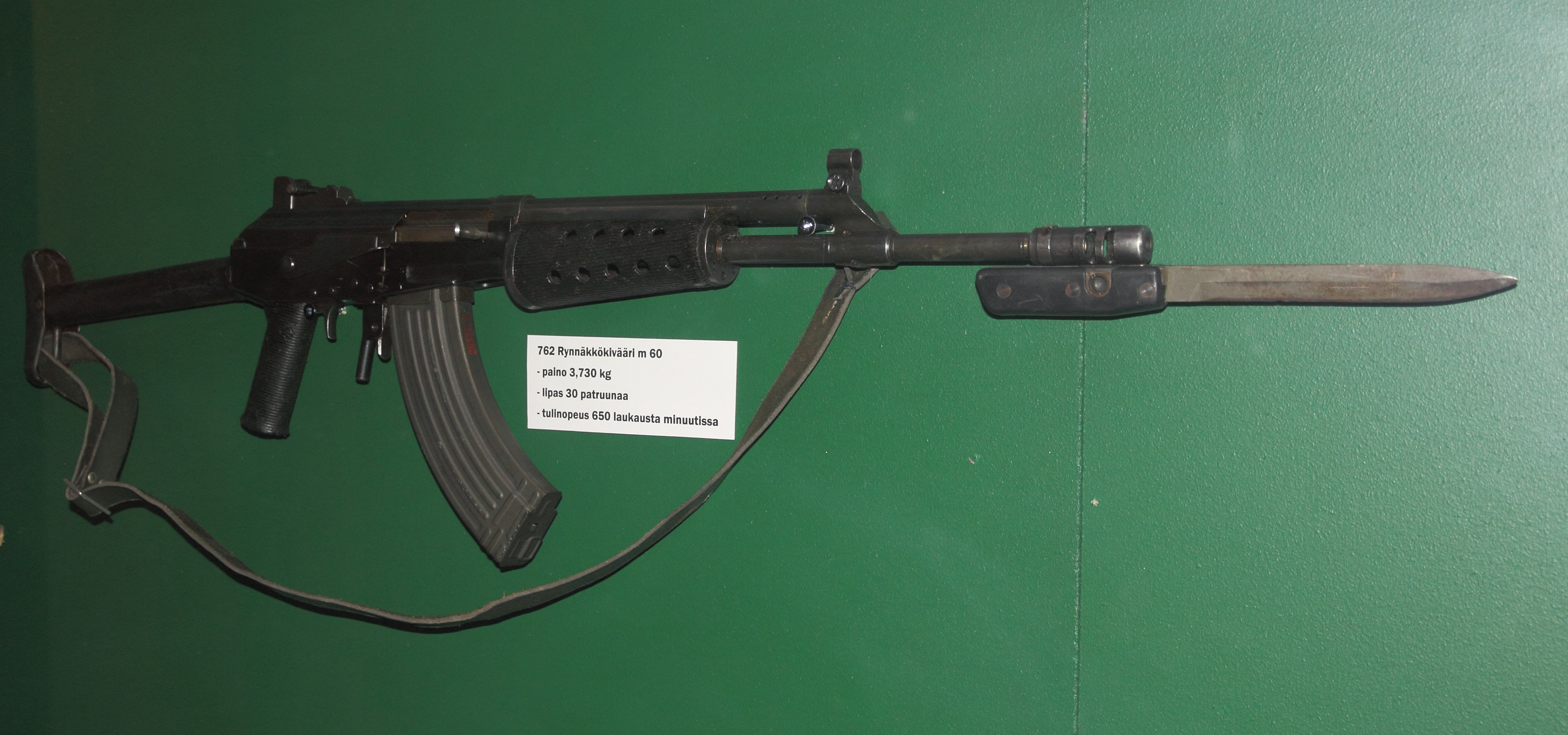
RK 60, second variant with bayonet

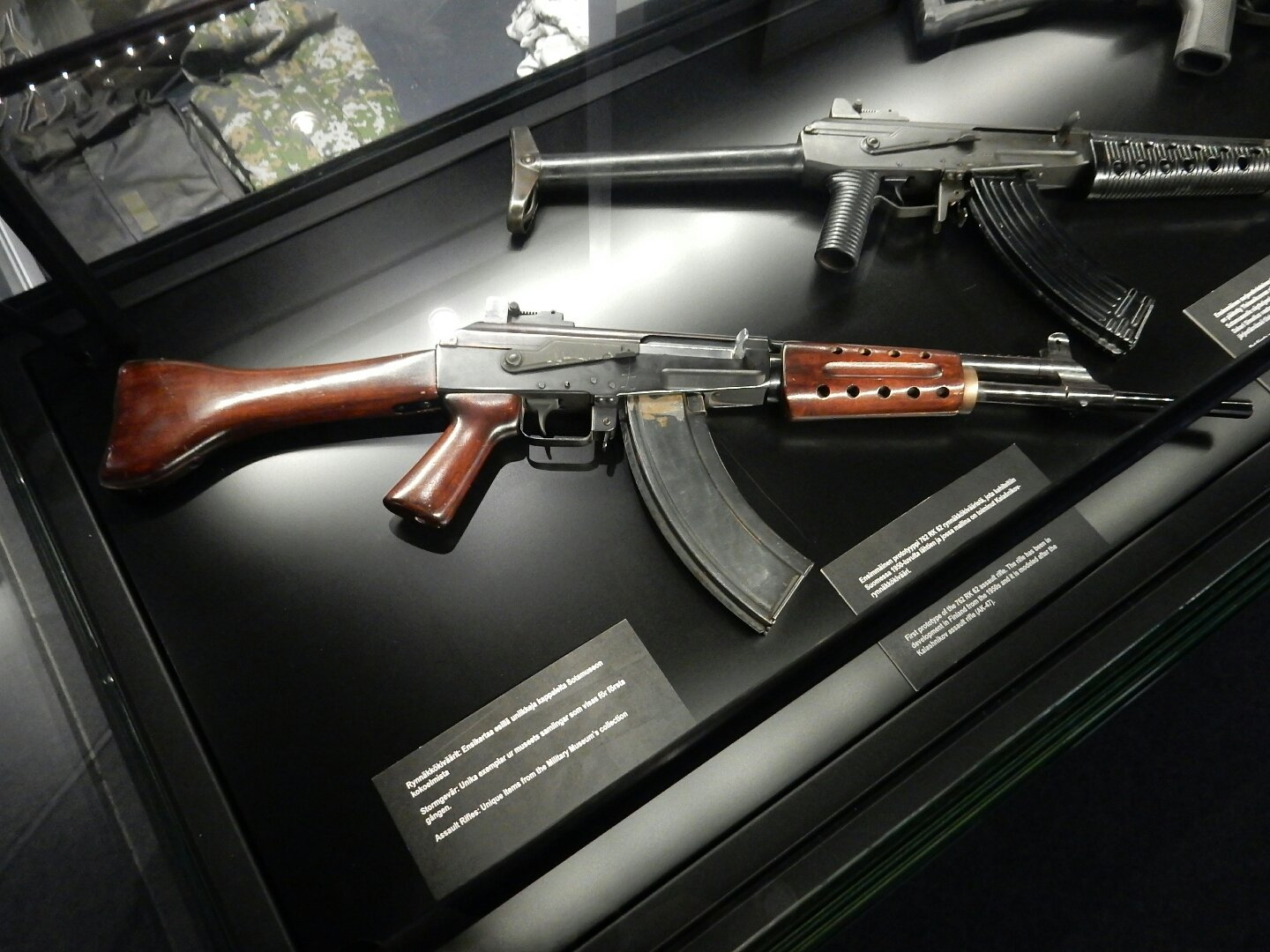
M58

==== TAK ====
Valmet sniper rifle prototype for FDF, based on the RK 71, chambered in 7.62×53mmR and fed from 20-round Lahti-Saloranta M/26 magazines.

==== RK 90 ====
Sako prototype for the FDF incorporating many features from the Galil.

==== RK 92 ====
Sako prototype for the FDF, returning from the RK 90 to a conventional Kalashnikov-type decisions in many aspects.

=== Military ===
==== RK 62 series ====
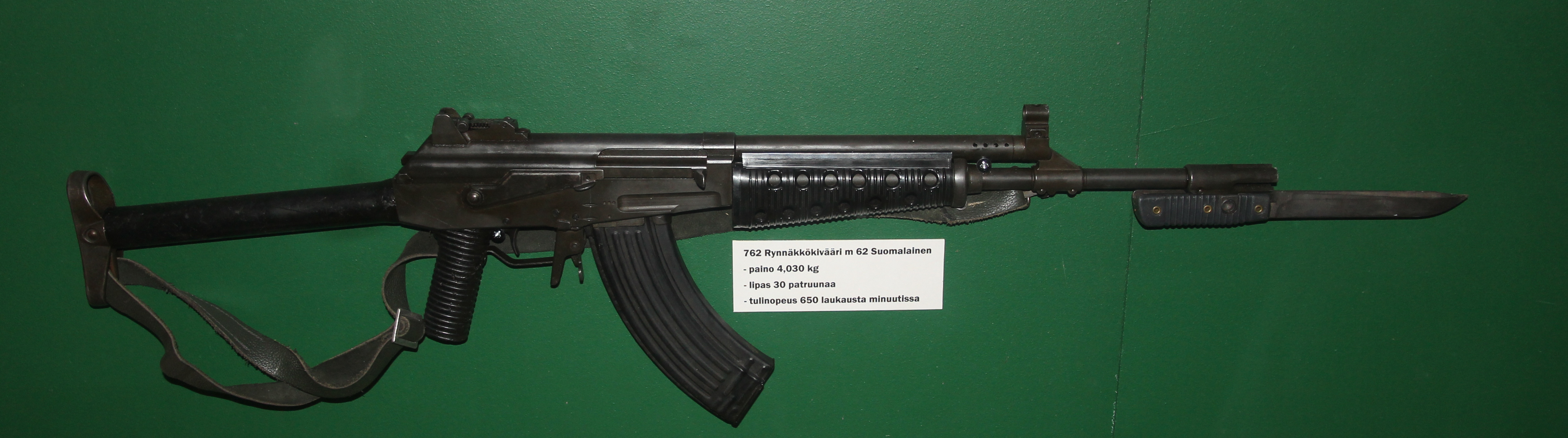
RK 62 PT

===== RK 62 PT =====
The initial production type rifles, with the PT suffix added after the main RK 62 production run started.

These lacked the tritium illuminated night sights and had a buttstock and rear and front sight similar to the RK 60.

Most have since been converted to RK 62 standard, the remaining have been phased out of service.

===== RK 62 =====
The main production runs since the mid-1960s. These have the new style sights with tritium illuminated night sights, strengthened buttstock, and a new style gas port.

Earlier runs featured the older type plastic furniture, while the production since the early 1970s has the new style plastic furniture, which has been retrofitted to the earlier rifles as well if the parts were in need of maintenance.

Later production runs have the rear of the receiver simplified and the buttstock tube attachment system was changed to the same roll pin system as in the Israeli Galil.

The versions with the later style plastic hardware weight a total of 3.5 kg. When rifles in circulation return to the FDF armories they have holes drilled to them for attaching a rail for optical sights, adding VV to the end of the name.

===== RK 62 TP =====
Folding stock version from the later batches of the RK 62, with a Galil-type buttstock attaching system and hinge. The hinge of the folding stock makes the rifle slightly longer than the standard RK 62 when the buttstock is extended.

===== RK 62 95 TP =====
Folding stock version of the rifles used by the Finnish Border Guard, which features the folding stock and selector switch from the RK 95 TP, as well as a rail for optics.

===== RK 62 kromattu =====
Fully functional chrome plated version of the late RK 62 production variant for FDF conscript band displays.

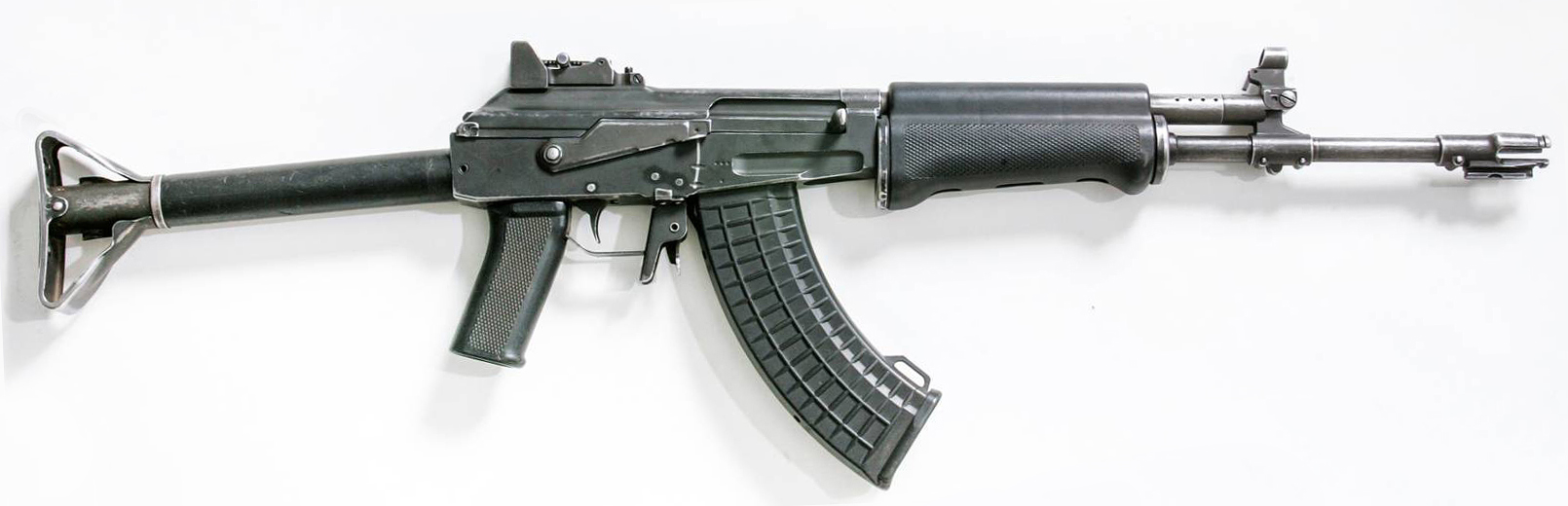
RK 62 with later version plastic furniture and Galil-type roll pin fastened buttstock

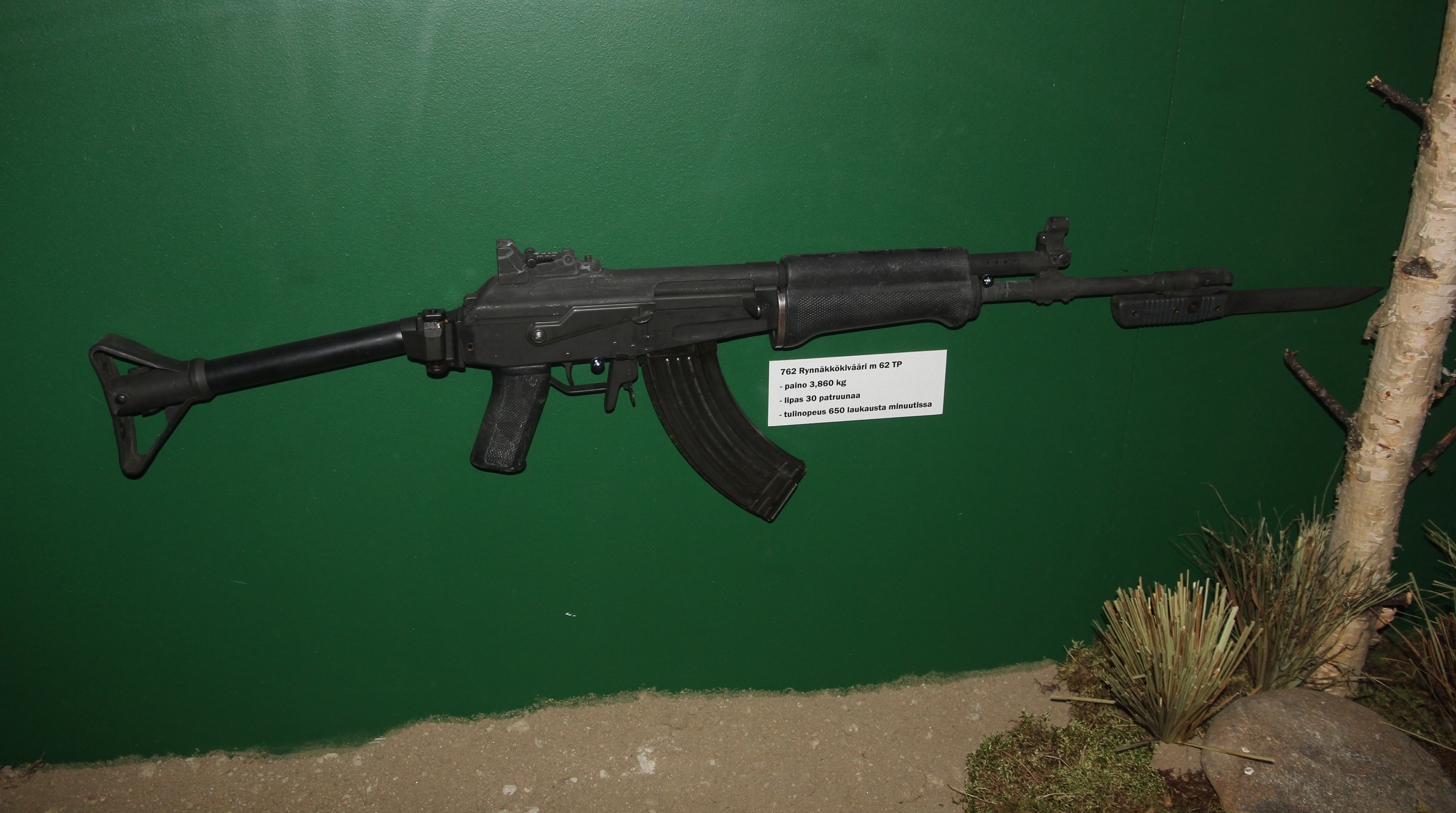
RK 62 TP

==== RK 62 M series ====
In August 2015, the Finnish Defence Forces announced that they will gradually modernize existing RK 62 rifles.

The old tubular butt and leather sling will be replaced with a telescopic stock and tactical sling. An option for mounting a top rail for telescopic sights and night vision devices will be added to all rifles; likewise, the barrel will get an attachment point for tactical lights and lasers.

===== RK 62 M1 =====
FDF baseline modernisation of existing RK 62 rifles with a telescoping stock and mounting rails for optical sights and tactical lights as well as a new, improved selector switch.

===== RK 62 M2 =====
More extensive modernisation over the RK 62 M1, with a new front handguard with M-LOK rail interface, and a new Ase Utra BoreLock flash hider which can mount a suppressor or a rebar cutter.

===== RK 62 M3 =====
RK 62 M2 with OD Green Cerakote surface treatment.

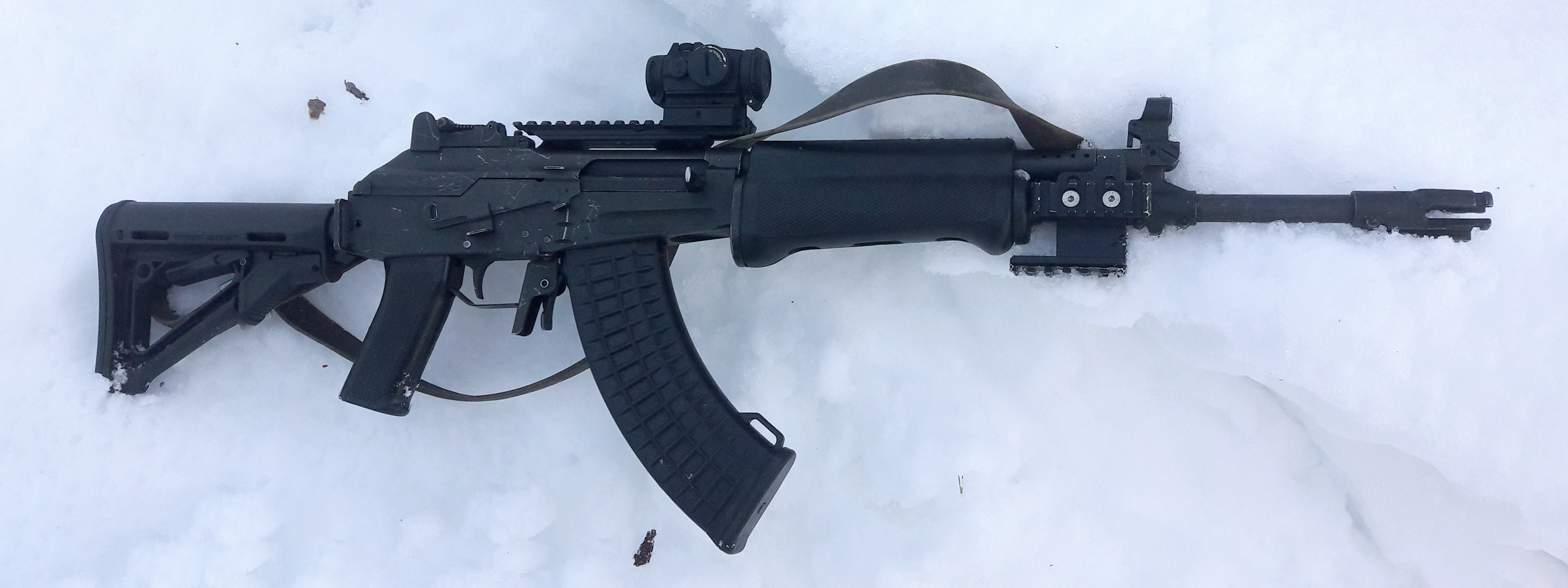
RK 62 M1

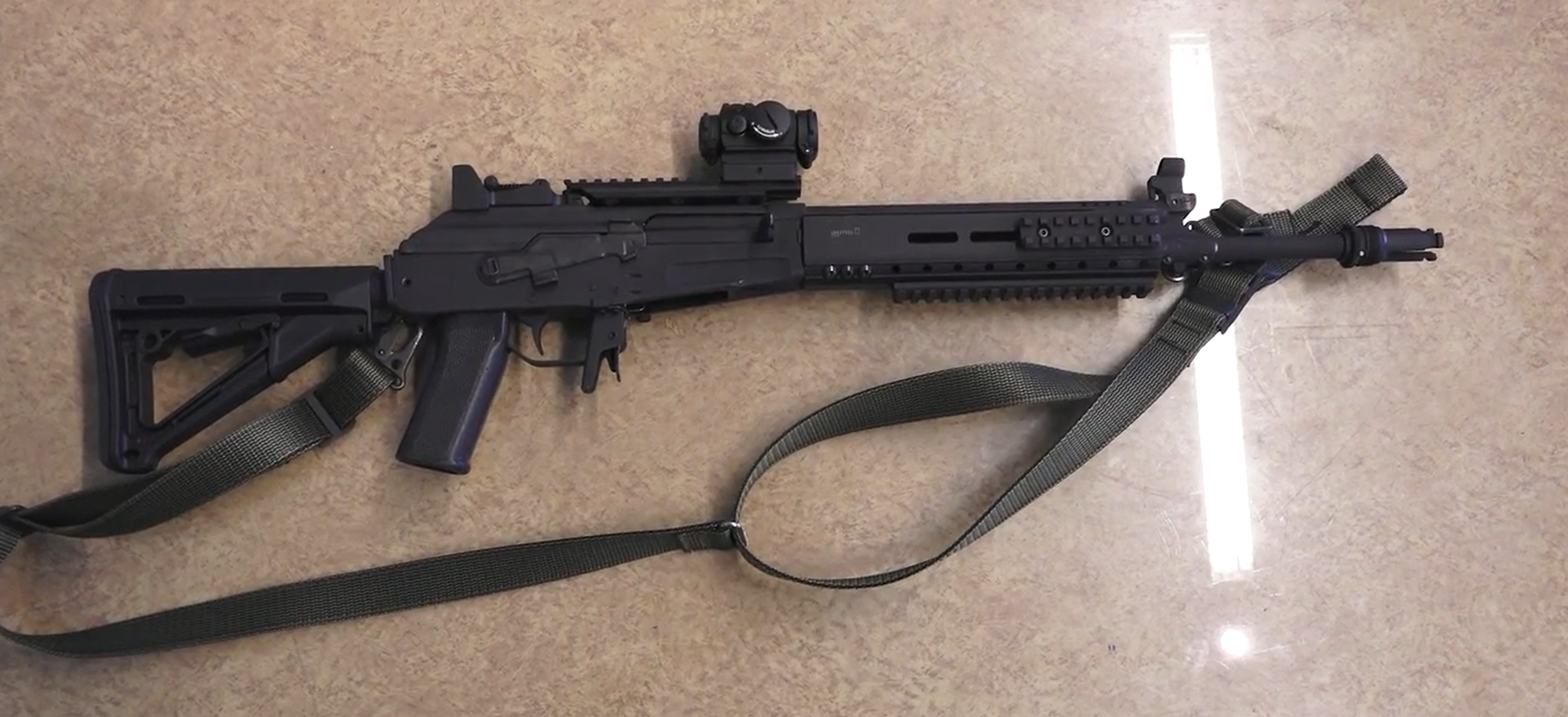
RK 62 M2

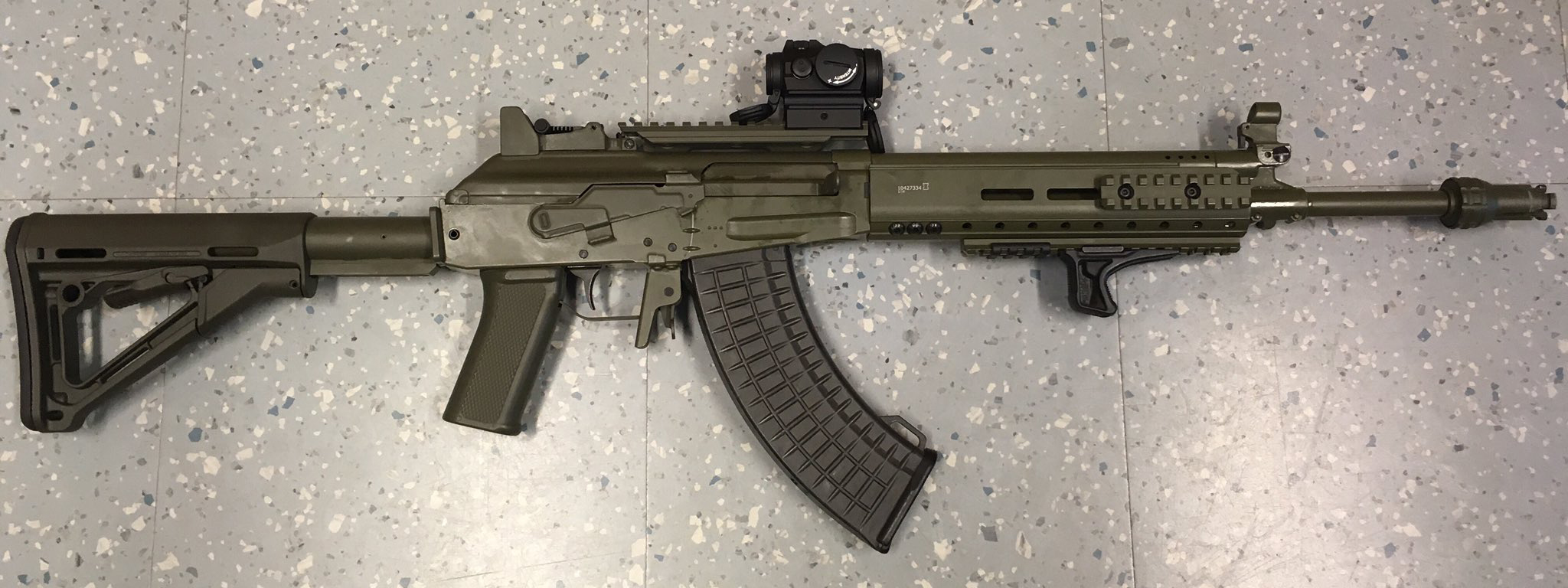
RK 62 M3

==== RK 62 76 series ====
===== RK 62 76 =====
Stamped steel receiver version, which resembles the RK 62 with newer style plastic furniture, but features a lighter weight receiver.

The total weight of the RK 62 76 is 3.27 kg. Unlike between AK-47 and AKM, the internal parts are fully interchangeable between RK 62 and RK 62 76, the only difference being the receiver.

===== RK 62 76 TP =====
Stamped steel receiver version with an early type folding stock.

===== M/82 =====
Bullpup prototype assault rifle using the RK 62 76 receiver.

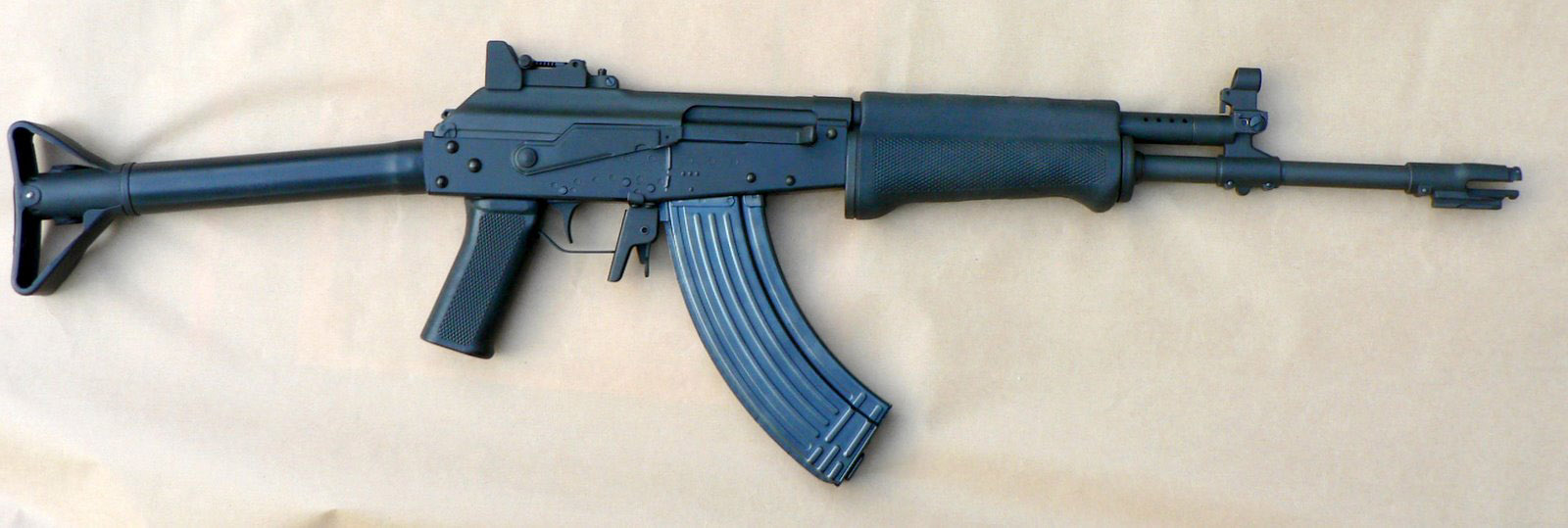
RK 62 76

==== RK 71 ====
Stamped steel receiver rifle, which has a different sight layout from the RK 62: rear sight is an open notch with distance adjustment welded on the gas tube and front sight is at the front end of the barrel, behind the flash suppressor. The internal parts of the receiver aren't fully compatible with the RK 62 or RK 62 76.

===== RK 71 TP =====
Folding stock version of the RK 71 with an AKS-47 type folding stock.

==== RK 95 TP ====
Newer Sako production derivative of the RK 62 with several features inspired by the Galil and other assault rifles.

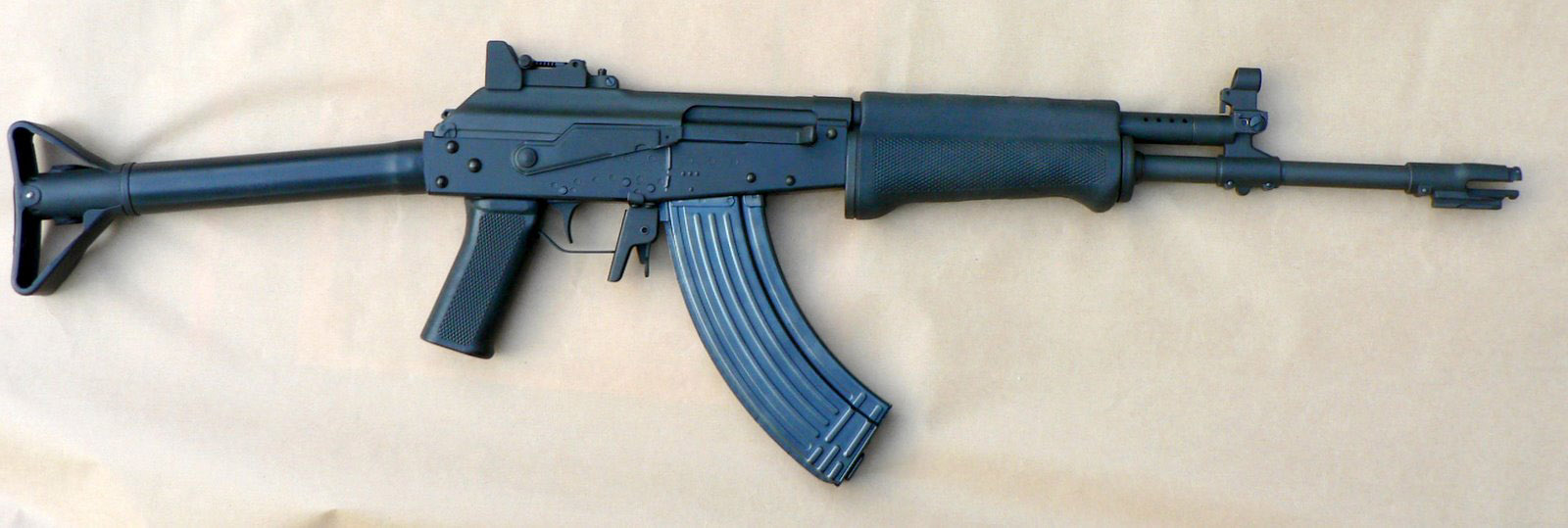
RK 62 76

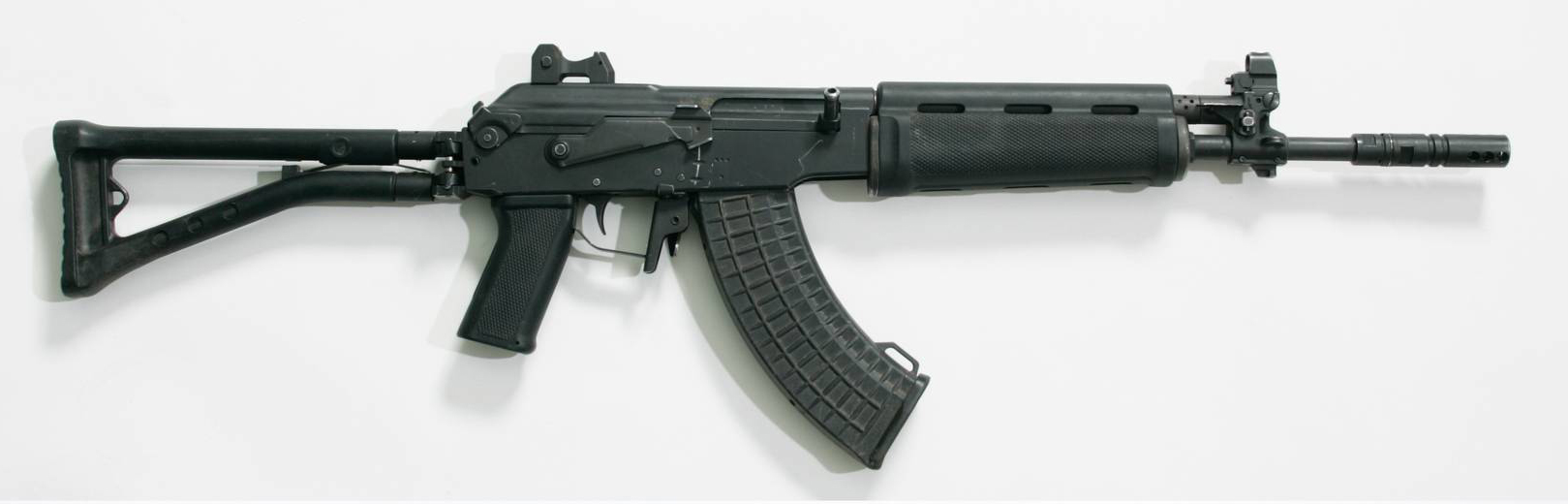
RK 95 TP

=== Export (Military/LE) ===
- Valmet M62 – RK 62. Exported for the Qatar Armed Forces.
- Valmet M72 – a chrome plated variant of the RK 71 for the Royal Guard of the Qatar Armed Forces in 7.62×39mm.
- Valmet M76 – RK 62 76. Exported for the Indonesian Sea and Coast Guard in .222 Remington.
- Sako M95 – a proposed export variant of the RK 95 TP, in 5.56×45mm NATO and 7.62×39.

=== Civilian ===
- Valmet M62/S – a civilian semi-automatic variant of the RK 62 with early type plastic hardware, some models had also wooden buttstock. Produced only in 7.62×39mm.
- Valmet M71/S – a civilian semi-automatic variant of the RK 71. Features all wooden, plastic and tubular stock versions, with both plastic and wooden front handguards.
- Valmet M76 (stamped) – a civilian semi-automatic variant of the RK 62 76, produced in .222 Remington, .223 Remington/5.56×45mm NATO and 7.62×39.
  - Valmet M76W – a wooden stock version
  - Valmet M76F – a folding stock version
  - Valmet M76P – a plastic stock version
- Valmet M76 (milled) – a civilian semi-automatic variant of the RK 62, produced in .243 Winchester, 7.62×39 and .308 Winchester.
- Valmet M78 (stamped) – an export variant of the RK 62 76 with a strengthened front trunnion, heavier barrel and sight layout of the RK 71, which led to external resemblance to the Soviet RPK. Developed separately from the FDF M/74 prototype; experiences from the FDF/Valmet TAK prototype were used in the development of the M78, which led to the decision to strengthen the front trunnion. Produced in .223 Rem/5.56 NATO, 7.62×39 and .308 Win. This weapon is also notorious among Canadian gun owners, as when Canada banned the AK, and any variant, the Valmet M78 was one of the only rifles that were specifically excluded.
  - Valmet M78/83s – a modified DMR variant of the M78, in which the stock and pistol grip are replaced by a thumbhole grip and a scope mount with a Mauser Mark X Electro-Point 4×40 scope.
- Valmet M78 (milled) – a milled (RK 62) receiver variant of the stamped M78.
- Valmet M82 – a civilian semi-automatic variant of the M82 bullpup assault rifle. Produced in .223 Rem/5.56 NATO.
- Valmet M83 – a civilian semi-automatic variant of the late-production RK 62.
- Valmet Petra/Hunter M/83 – a civilian semi-automatic hunting rifle using the RK 62 action. Sold in Finland as the Valmet Petra M/83 and outside Finland as the Valmet Hunter M83. Produced in .223 Rem/5.56 NATO, .243 Win, .308 Win and .30-06 Springfield. In Finland there are also series of a bullpup aftermarket modification chambered in 9.3×62mm.
  - Valmet Petra/Hunter M/88 – modified version of the Valmet Petra, with a push safety replacing the Kalashnikov-type selector lever, and a different sight layout (front sight at the front end of the barrel).
- Sako M92 S – a civilian semi-automatic variant of the RK 95 TP. Most have a fixed stock in place of the folding stock.

=== Derivatives ===
The Rk 62 is the basis of the IMI Galil, an Israeli-made assault rifle with many similarities and were made with the assistance of and on machinery bought from Valmet.

== Gallery ==
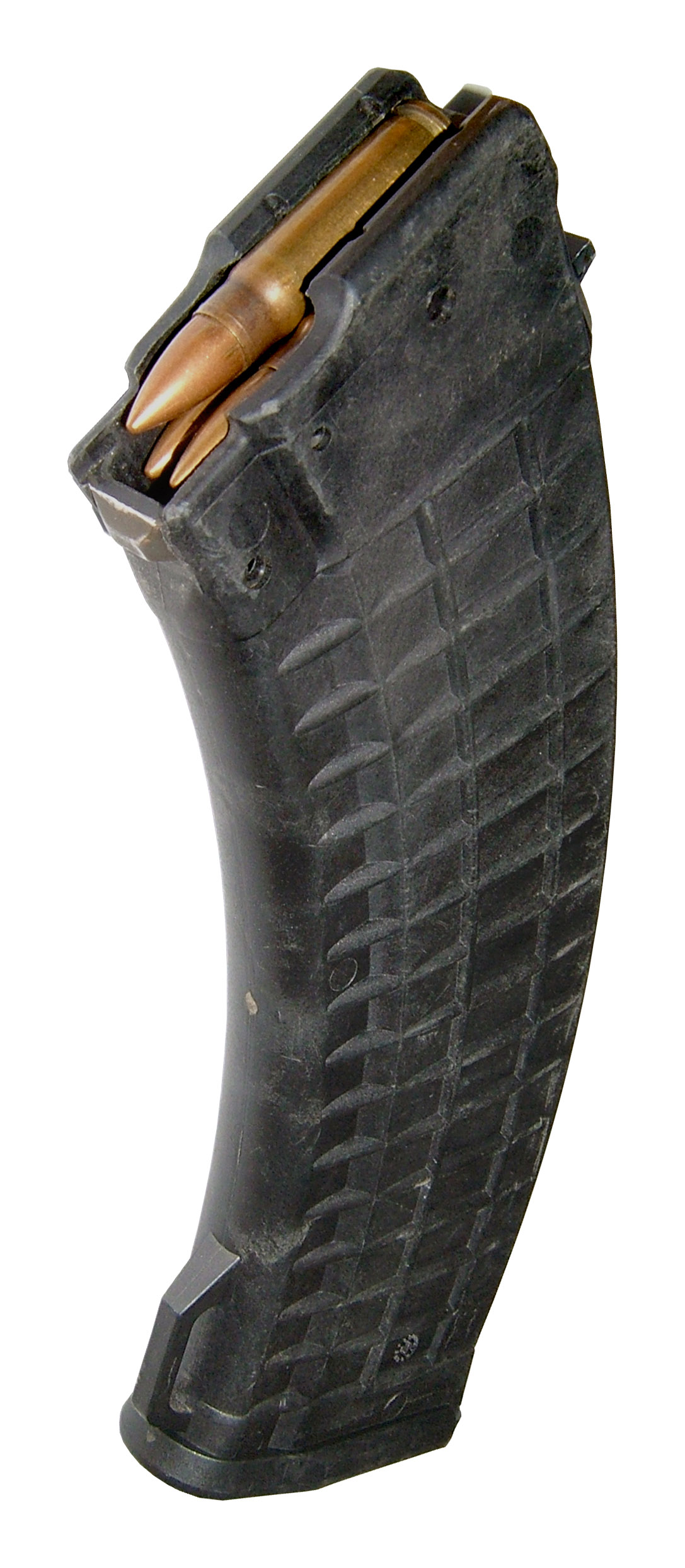
Loaded RK 62/95 magazine

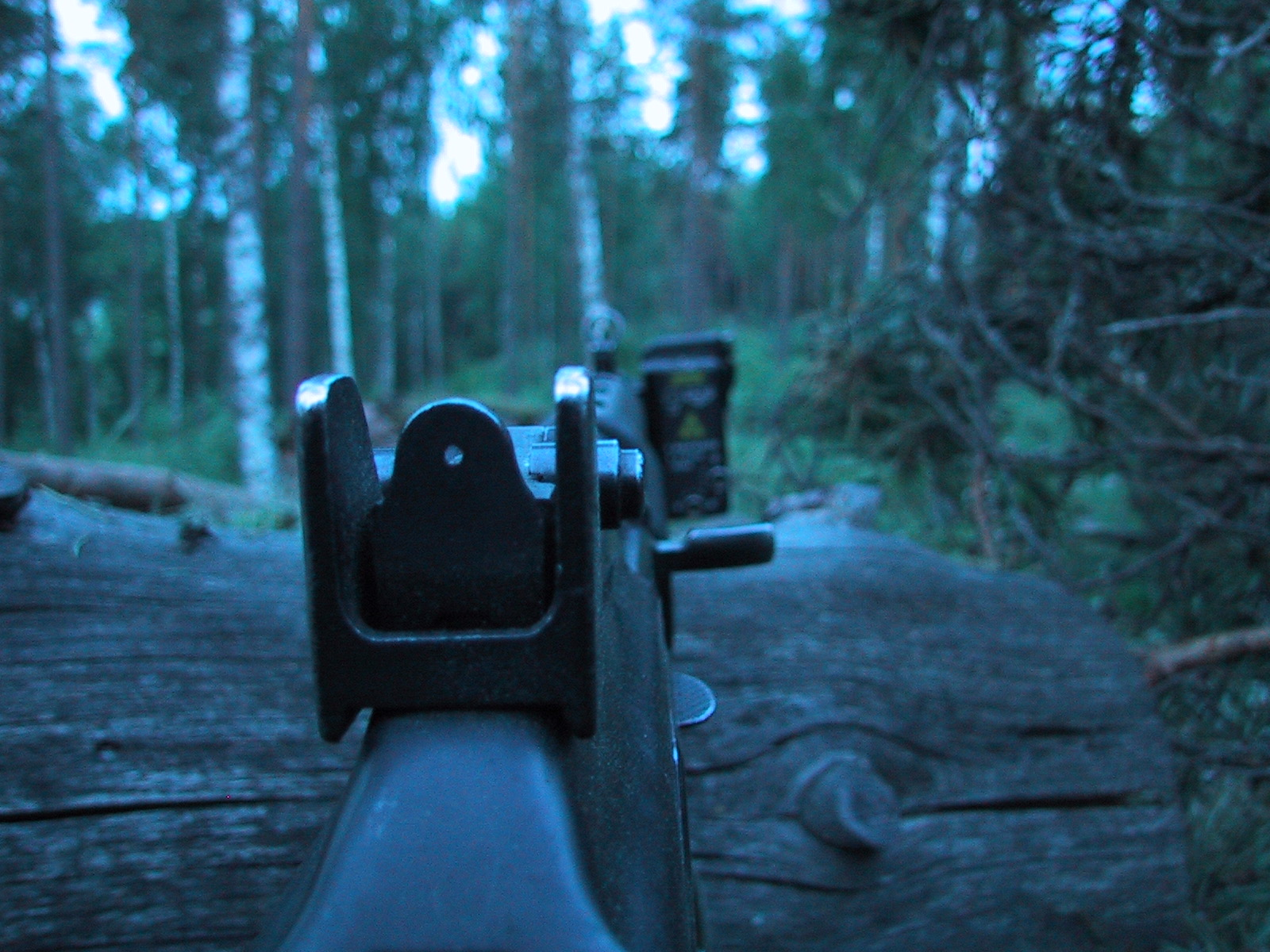
RK 62 rear sight

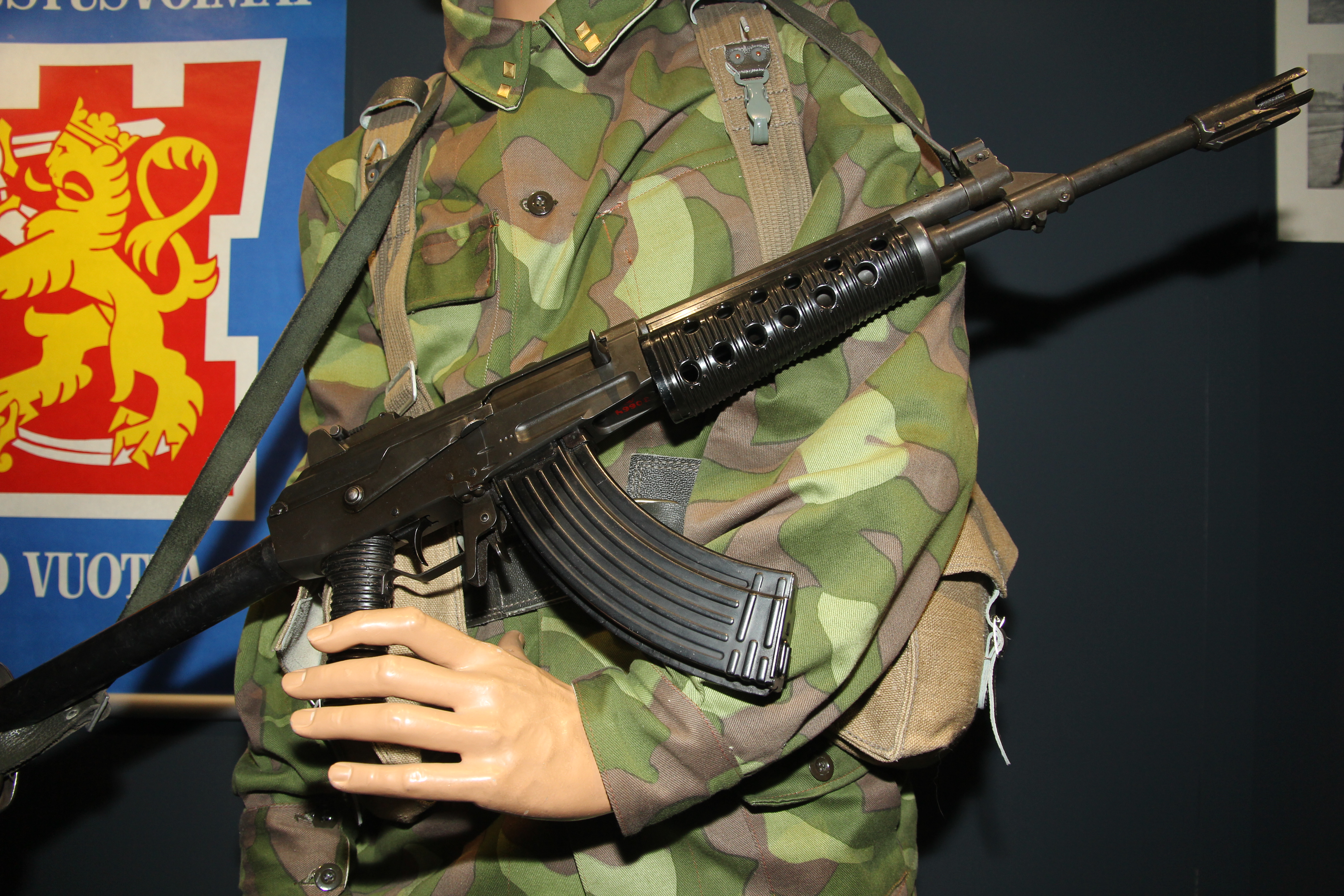
A mannequin of a Finnish reserve officer candidate from the 1960s with an RK 62

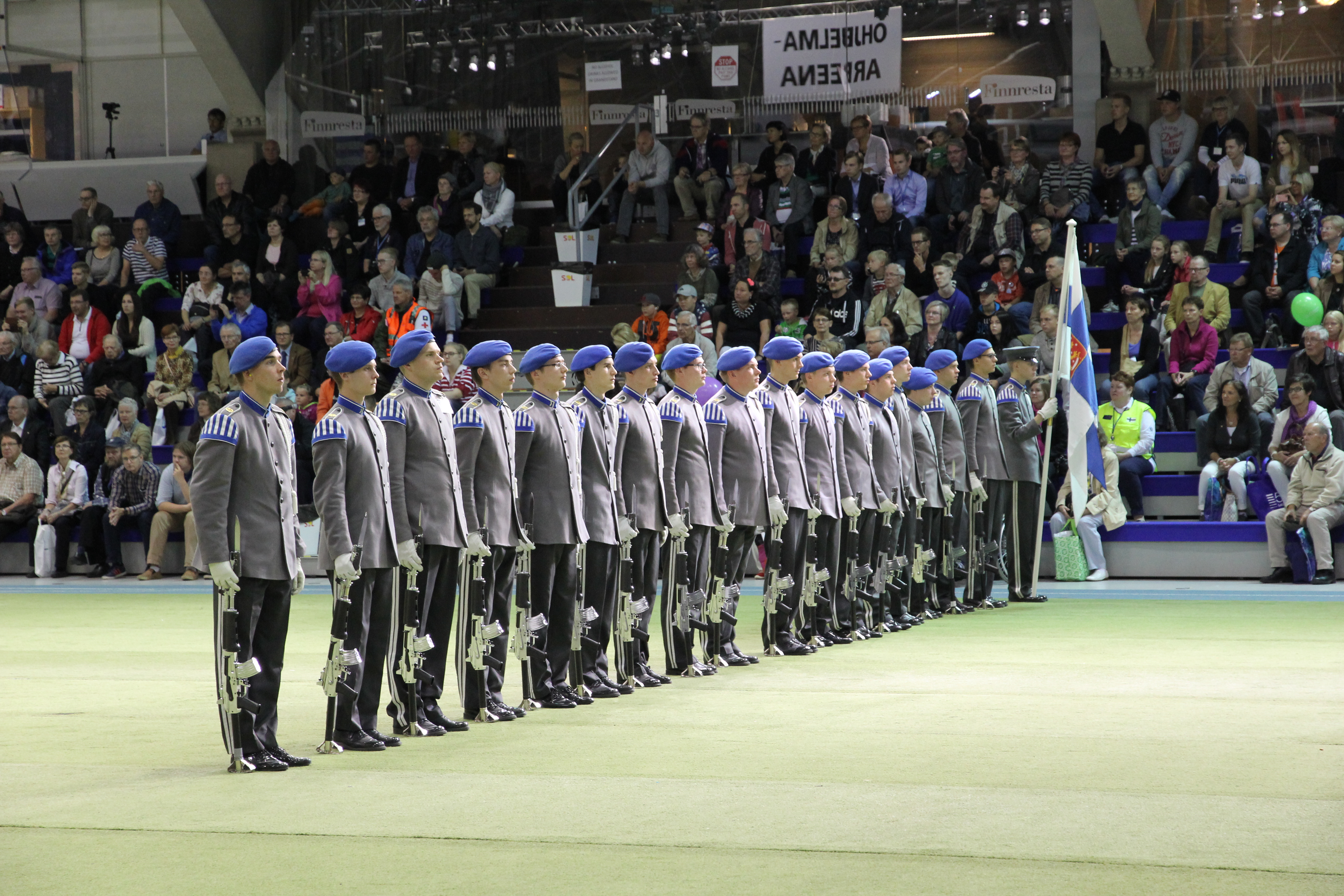
FDF Conscript Band soldiers handling chrome plated RK 62 rifles

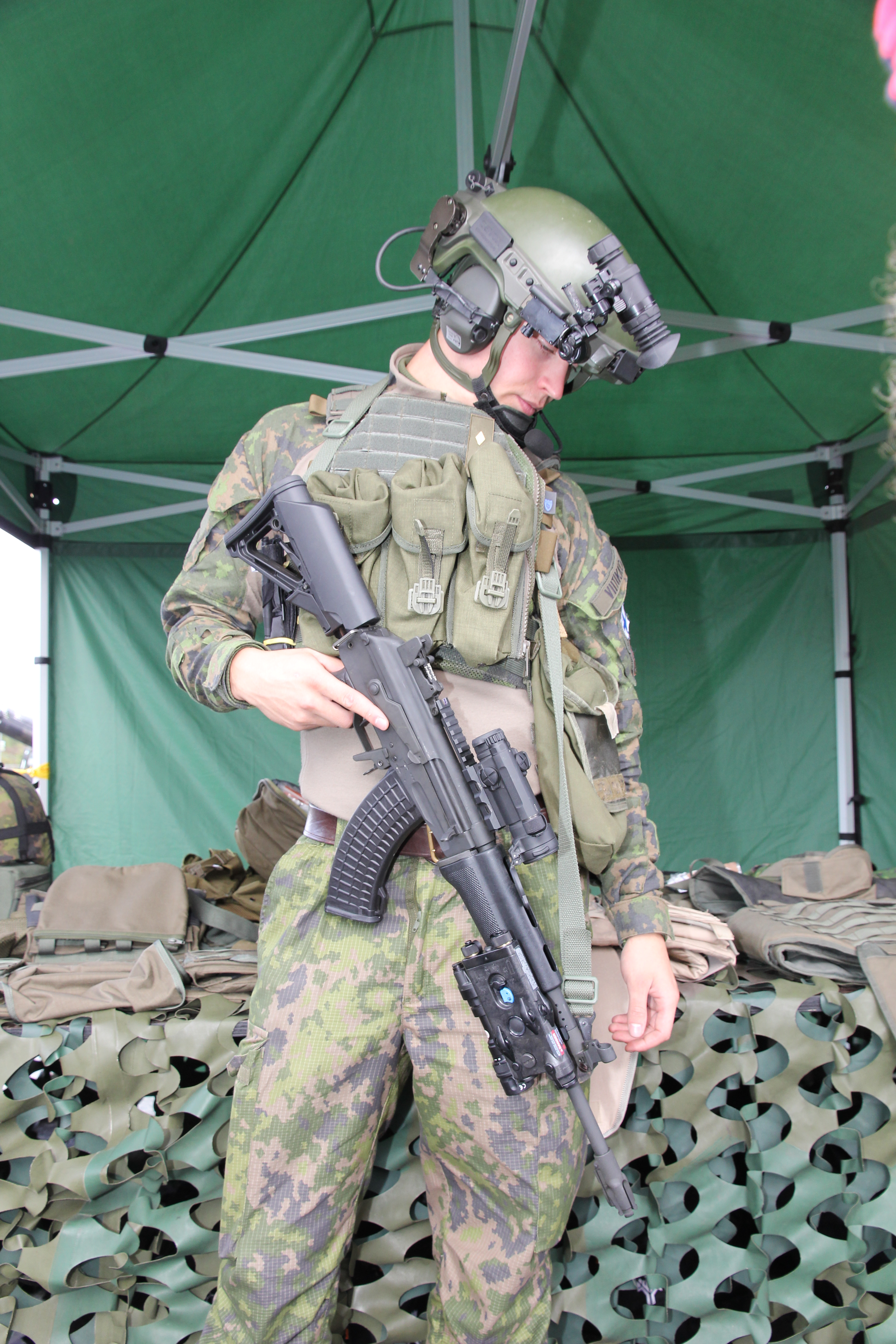
A Finnish soldier with an RK 62M

== Users ==
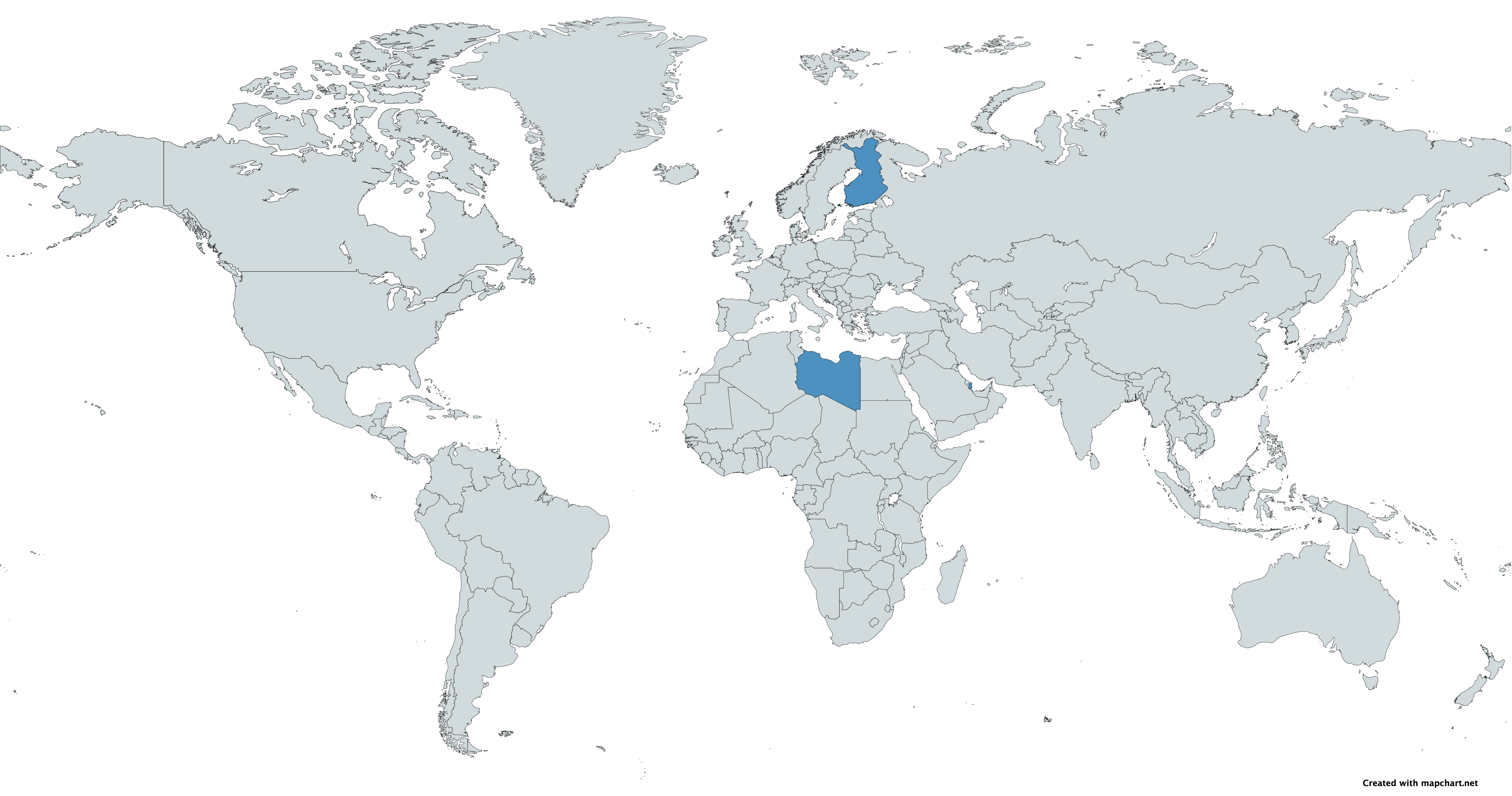
A map with nations who use the RK 62 in blue

- Finland
- Indonesia
- Libya
- Qatar

== See also ==
- Valmet M82
- RK 95 TP
- IMI Galil
- Madsen LAR
