= RK 95 TP =

Finnish assault rifle

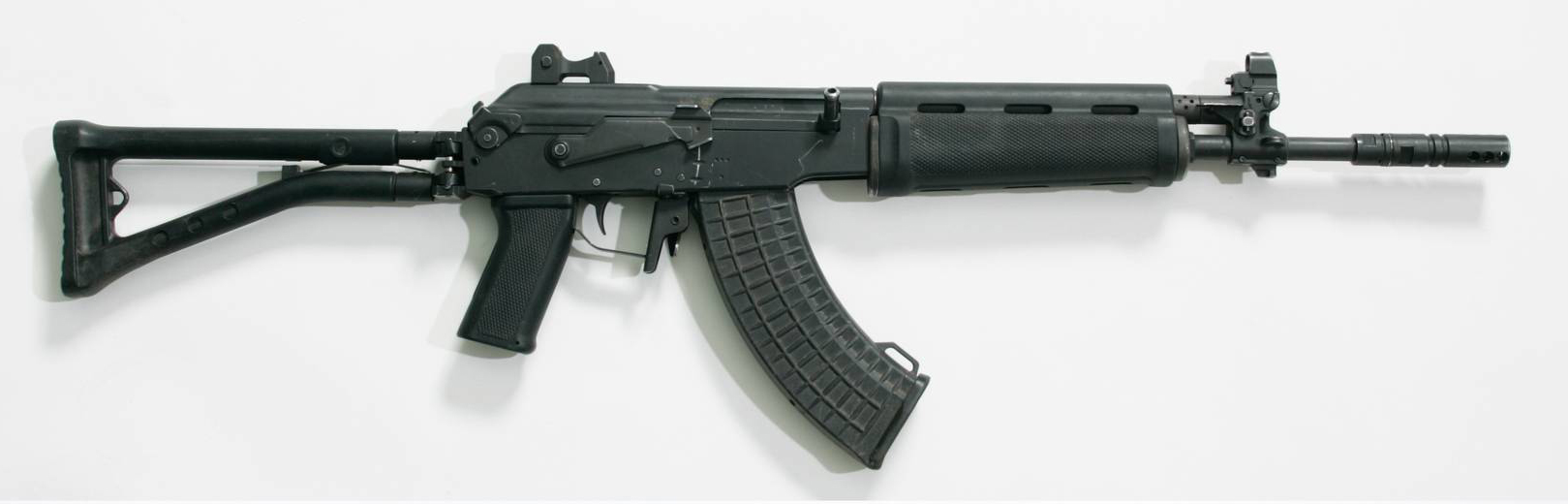
- Sako RK 95 TP
- Type: Assault rifle
- Place of origin: Finland

Service history
- In service: 1995–present
- Used by: See Users
- Wars: War in Afghanistan

Production history
- Designed: 1988–1990
- Manufacturer: SAKO
- Produced: 1995–1998
- No. built: 20,000
- Variants: M92S

Specifications
- Mass: 3.7 kg (8.16 lb)
- Length: 935 mm (36.8 in) stock extended / 675 mm (26.6 in) stock folded
- Barrel length: 420 mm (16.5 in)
- Cartridge: 7.62×39mm
- Action: Gas-operated, rotating bolt
- Rate of fire: 600–750 rounds/min
- Muzzle velocity: 715 m/s (2,346 ft/s)
- Effective firing range: 150, 300 m (490, 980 ft) sight gradations
- Feed system: 30-round detachable box magazine
- Sights: Flip-up dual rear aperture and front post with tritium inserts 465 mm (18.3 in) sight radius

The RK 95 TP (Finnish: Rynnäkkökivääri 95 taittoperä, lit. 'Assault Rifle 95 folding stock'), officially 7.62 RK 95 TP and commercially known as the M95, is a 7.62×39mm Finnish assault rifle adopted in relatively small numbers by the Finnish Defence Forces in the 1990s.

== History ==
The rifle was developed in the late 1980s in response to a requirement to replace the 7.62mm RK 62 service rifle. Between 1988 and 1990, the SAKO company developed the M90 prototype, which was a substantially upgraded variant of the RK 62. Changes to the original design included the fire control and safety selector, whose lever was transferred to the left side of the receiver housing, the cocking handle cut-out in the bolt carrier assembly was covered with a strip of metal.

The cocking handle itself was placed at an upward angle (enhancing left-handed reloading), the rear sight assembly was installed on a sliding tangent with 150 and 300 m range adjustments and the rifle was equipped with a folding tubular stock with a latch modeled on the locking solution employed in the SIG SG 540 rifle. The M90 was also equipped with a multifunction muzzle device and manual gas valve, enabling the use of rifle grenades.

Some advertisements released in Finland in the 1990s suggested that SAKO was going to produce the M90 in 5.56 NATO caliber. However, this type was never produced.

Two prototypes were developed by SAKO, known as the RK 92, were delivered to the FDF for combat trials.

After undergoing further testing and implementing several changes (among them, the selector mechanism was reverted to the familiar RK 62 configuration) the rifle was introduced into service with the Finnish Army as the 7.62 RK 95 TP. Deliveries to the Finnish started in 1995 and ended at 1997 with further orders ceasing in 1998. The first RK 95 with the serial number 960,001 was presented by SAKO representatives to the Military Museum in Helsinki, which is on display.

Prior to the adoption of the RK 95, several Chinese and East German-based AKs were purchased by Finland to easily arm mobilized Finnish soldiers in the 90s.

In 2015, the RK 95 is supplemented by the FN SCAR-L, which is used by Finnish special forces units.

On April 18, 2023, it was reported that Sako made several RK 95s in a gold finish for export to the UAE in the late 1990s for the Amiri Guard.

== Design ==
=== Operating mechanism ===
The RK 95 TP is a select-fire, gas-operated firearm using the Kalashnikov-pattern operating system with a long stroke gas piston rod coupled to the bolt carrier as in the AK rifle. The rotating bolt locks into battery via two locking lugs.

=== Features ===
The weapon's spring extractor is installed inside the bolt head and enclosed in one of the locking lugs while the ejector is a fixed protrusion of the internal bolt carrier guide rail. The firearm uses a hammer-type firing mechanism and a trigger group that enables semi-automatic and fully automatic firing modes. The fire selector switch, which is also the manual safety toggle, can occupy one of three positions: the top "safe" setting (the trigger and bolt carrier are both disabled mechanically), the middle setting (marked with three dot symbols) produces continuous fire and the bottom setting (single dot) activates a disconnector for single fire mode.

The weapon's barrel has a multipurpose muzzle attachment, which performs the role of a muzzle brake, flash suppressor and a mounting base for launching rifle grenades. The gas block incorporates a manually adjustable gas regulator that isolates and disconnects the gas system in the closed position and a lug at its base—used to attach a blade bayonet (i.e. KCB-type bayonet).

The RK 95 TP has a plastic-coated tubular metal shoulder stock that folds to the right side and features an internal compartment used to store a cleaning rod. Both the forward handguard and pistol grip are made of a lightweight synthetic.

For maintenance the weapon is field stripped into the following components: the receiver and barrel, bolt carrier, bolt, return mechanism, gas tube, receiver cover and magazine.

=== Feeding ===
The RK 95 TP is chambered for the intermediate 7.62×39mm M43 cartridge, due to its reliability in cold and harsh weather/terrain conditions. The rifle feeds from curved box magazines made of an impact-resistant polymer (empty weight: 0.16 kg), with a 30-round capacity of double-stacked cartridges. These magazines are also interchangeable with standard AK-47/AKM magazines.

=== Sights ===
The rifle comes with adjustable iron sights, consisting of a forward post and an L-shaped dual-aperture rear flip sight with settings for firing at ranges of 150 and 300 m. The front sight, corrected for windage and elevation, is mounted in a semi-shrouded post on top of the gas block, and the rear sight—on the receiver top cover.

For operation in low-level lighting conditions the rifle uses subdued self-luminous tritium gas vials, installed in a separate folding post attached to the base of the front sight and deployed manually, and in the rear sight assembly in a fixed notch sight, exposed by rotating the rear sight arm 180° forward around its pivot axis.

Additionally the rifle can be adapted to use various optical sights (e.g. the Trijicon ACOG or night vision equipment such as the Patria VV 2000 passive night sight), through the use of a receiver-mounted side-rail. A detachable cheek riser is employed when using optics.

=== Accessories ===
The rifle can be used with a barrel-mounted bipod or a 40 mm underslung grenade launcher attachment. A railed gas block attachment was also developed for the weapon and is used to mount tactical accessories. It can also use a mounted suppressor.

== Variants ==
=== M92S ===
A civilian 7.62mm-caliber semi-automatic variant was manufactured and marketed as the M92S. This was marketed to civilians, as well as for law enforcement sales. One way to tell this apart from the RK 95 TP is the absence of an automatic sear axis.

=== M95S ===
The M95S is a semi-auto variant of the RK 95 TP.

=== M95 ===
An export variant of the rifle was also produced, modified to use the 5.56×45mm NATO cartridge with the SS109 bullet, fed from plastic 30-round curved magazines. The barrel has four right-hand grooves with a rifling twist rate of 185 mm (1:7 in), and has a muzzle velocity of 920 m/s (3,018 ft/s) using standard ammunition.

Small numbers of this variant were made in order to show to clients for potential contracts that call for the purchase of the RK 95 TP in 5.56 NATO caliber in trade shows and arms conventions.

== Gallery ==
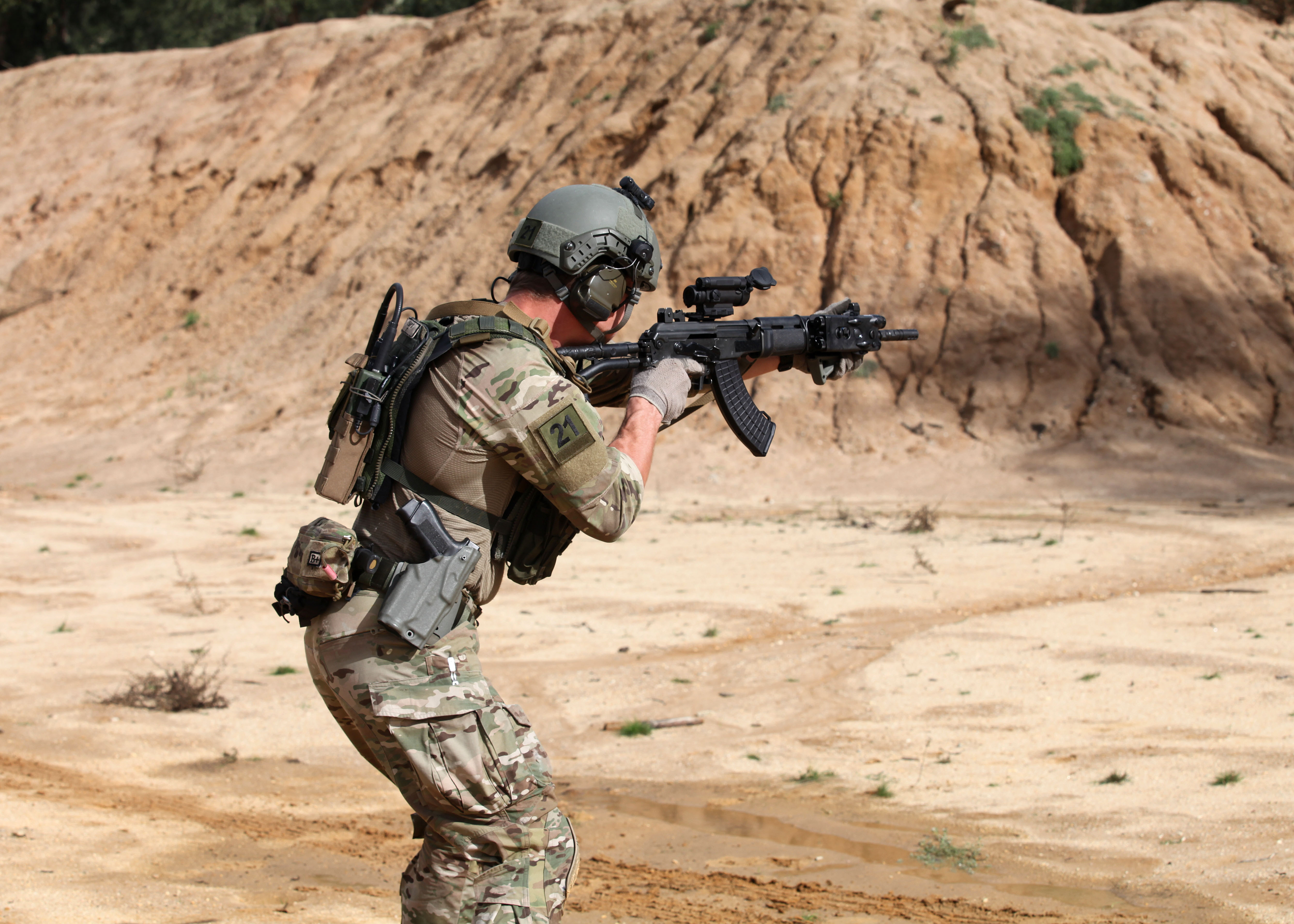
A Finnish soldier from the Naval Special Forces Unit ETO (Erikoistoimintaosasto) shooting with an RK 95 TP during an exercise.

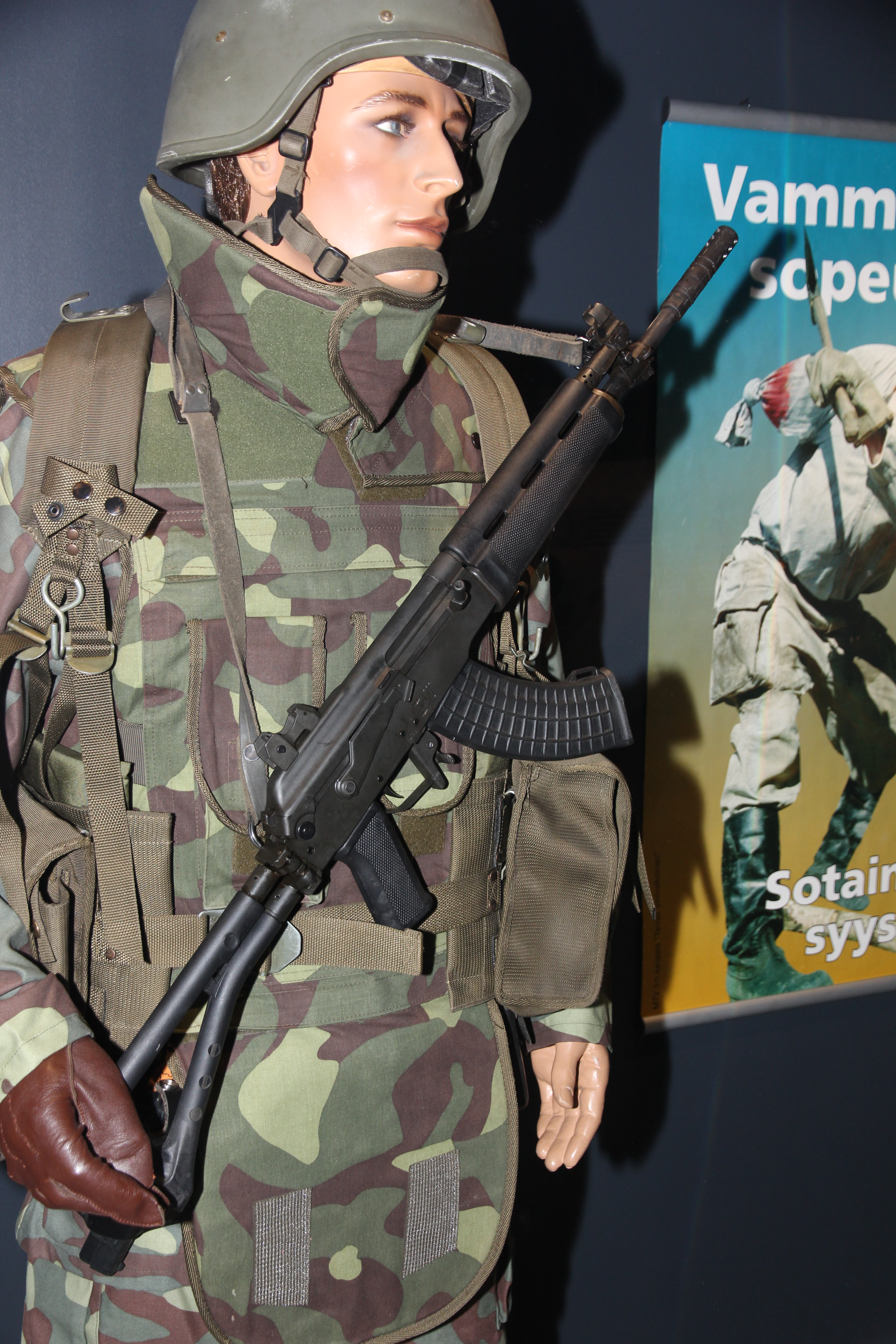
A Rk 95 on display

== Users ==
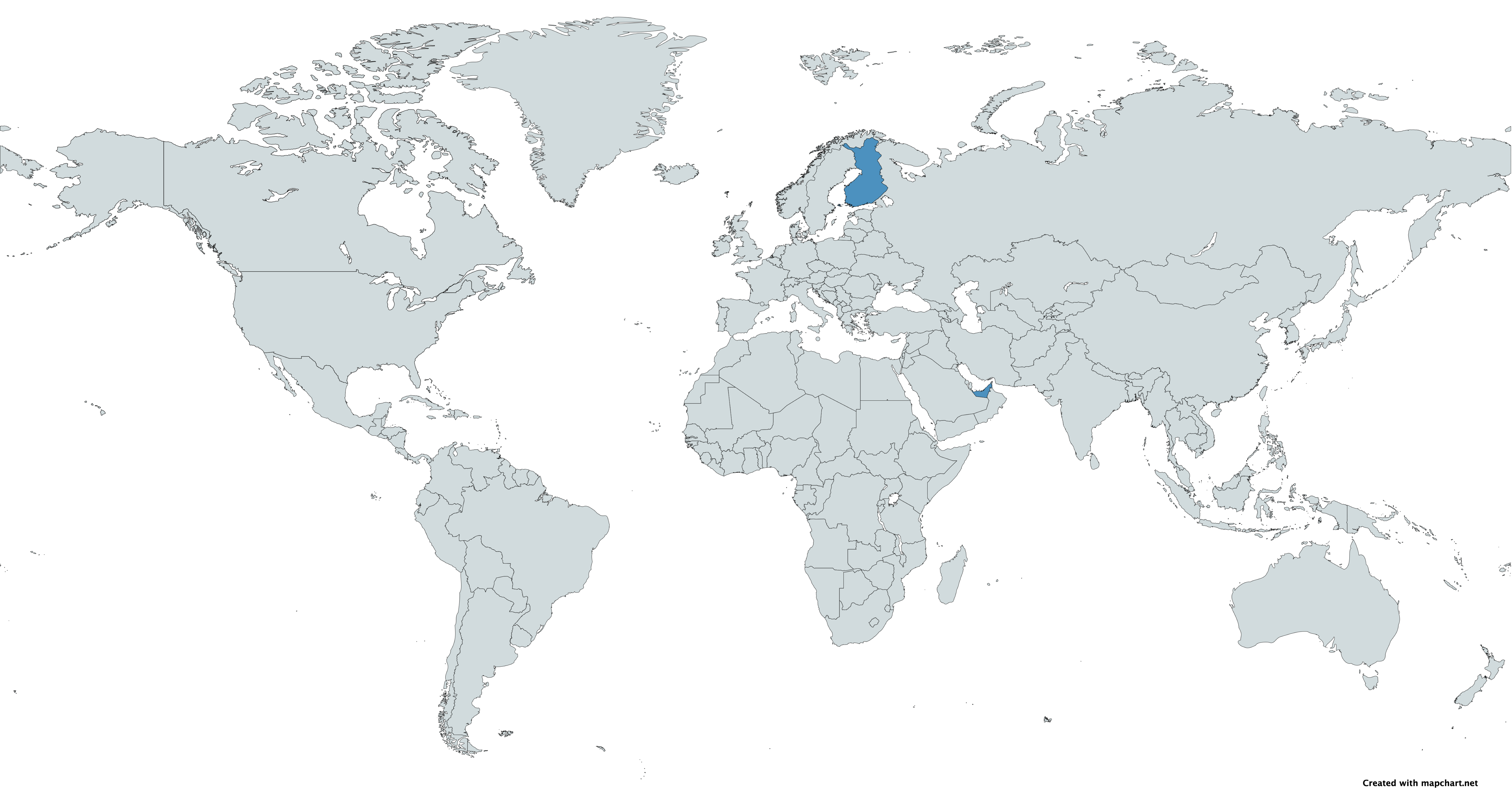
A map with users of the RK 95 TP in blue

- Finland
- United Arab Emirates

== Bibliography ==
- Roodhorst, Cor (2015). The Kalashnikov Encyclopedia: Recognition and Weapon Forensic Guide for Kalashnikov Arms and Derivatives I: Albania-Israel. Netherlands: Roodhorst Publications. ISBN 978-90-9027549-9.
- Salo, Pauli (2007). Rynnäkkökivääri 7,62x39. (Assault Rifle 7.62x39) (2nd ed.). ISBN 978-952-92-1328-3.
