= RRK =

RRK may refer to:

- Rahsaan Roland Kirk (1935–1977), American jazz multi-instrumentalist
- Revised Romanization of Korean, the Korean language romanization system of South Korea
- R. R. Keshavamurthy (1913–2006), Indian violinist
- Reinhard Rudolf Karl Hartmann, lexicographer and linguist
- Rice–Ramsperger–Kassel theory of chemical reactions, a precursor to RRKM theory
