= List of equipment of the Finnish Army =

This is a list of weapons used by the Finnish Army, for past equipment, see here.
For equipment or ships of the Finnish Navy, see List of equipment of the Finnish Navy and List of active Finnish Navy ships; for Finnish Air Force aircraft, see List of military aircraft of Finland.

== Armour and other vehicles ==
=== Main battle tanks ===
| Model | Origin | Type | Quantity | Image | Details |
|---|---|---|---|---|---|
| Leopard 2A6 | Germany | Main battle tank | 100 | | One hundred Leopard 2A6 tanks were acquired used from the Netherlands between 2015 and 2019. |
| Leopard 2A4 | Germany | Main battle tank | 100 | | The vast majority of the Leopard 2A4 tanks were acquired used from Germany between 2002 and 2004; more were purchased in 2009. Some of the existing 2A4s are equipped with Israeli made Urdan mine rollers. Fire-control systems of all vehicles will be upgraded between 2022 and 2026. There have been a total of 143 Leopard 2A4 vehicles in the Finnish army: 100 MBTs; 6 MBTs equipped with Urdan mine rollers; 10 Leopard 2L bridging tanks; 6 Leopard 2R mine-clearing tanks (all given to Ukraine in 2023, to help repel the Russian invasion of Ukraine); 6 Leopard 2 Marksman; 1 MBT in the armour museum; 14 MBTs stored for cannibalisation of spares, one is placed as a memorial in Hattula. |

=== Infantry fighting vehicles ===
| Model | Origin | Type | Quantity | Image | Details |
|---|---|---|---|---|---|
| BMP-2MD | Germany; Finland | Infantry fighting vehicle | 110 | | All vehicles modernised to the Finnish BMP-2MD standard with a new main gun supplied by Slovak ZTS Special AS, thermal imaging and Polish multi-spectral camouflage Berberys-R between 2015 and 2019. |
| CV9030 FIN | Sweden | Infantry fighting vehicle | 102 | | CV90 Mk II armed with a 30 mm Bushmaster II autocannon. |

=== Armoured personnel carriers (tracked) ===
| Model | Origin | Type | Quantity | Image | Details |
|---|---|---|---|---|---|
| MT-LB | Soviet Union | MT-LB: Armoured personnel carrier MT-LBv: Armoured personnel carrier MTP-LB: Technical support vehicle | 320 | | |
| MT-LBu | Soviet Union | Artillery command vehicle Ambulance Signals vehicle | 74 | | |
| Patria TRACKX | Finland | Armoured personnel carrier | 5 | | A pre-production series for testing purposes at the Kainuu Brigade. 2,5 MEUR/unit. Sweden ordered a similar amount. |

=== Armoured personnel carriers (wheeled) ===
| Model | Origin | Type | Quantity | Image | Details |
|---|---|---|---|---|---|
| Patria AMV XA-360 | Finland | Armoured personnel carrier | 62 | | With Protector (RWS) remote weapon station from Norway. |
| Protolab Misu | Finland | MRAP APC | 4 | | Four test vehicles have been ordered. |
| Sisu Pasi XA-180/185 | Finland | XA-180/185 Armoured personnel carrier XA-185AS: Armoured ambulance XA-185ST: NBC Reconnaissance vehicle | 464 | | |
| Sisu Pasi XA-202 | Finland | XA-202 VIPA: Signals vehicle XA-202 EPA: Command vehicle | 101 | | |
| Sisu Pasi XA-203 OWS | Finland | Armoured personnel carrier | 48 | | |
| Patria 6×6 XA-300 | Finland | Armoured personnel carrier Heavy armoured personnel carrier | 164 (19) | | Three pre-production vehicles bought in January 2022, A total of 91 series production vehicles in June 2023 with an option for 70 more for a total of 161, and 41 of the option were bought in December 2023 and January 2024 and the remaining 29 in September 2024, with deliveries until the end of 2025. A heavier armoured version with a Kongsberg RWS was ordered in April 2024, with an option for 18 more for a total of 19; deliveries are to take place 2026-2028. |
| Sisu GTP | Finland | MRAP APC | 44 (+more on order) | | Six test vehicles were ordered for delivery in 2021. In December 2022, an order of 25 production vehicles was announced. And in December 2023 a further 13 vehicles were ordered. Order in November 2025 in common with Sweden for over 300 vehicles (split unknown), deliveries 2026-28. |
| RG32M | South Africa | MRAP | 74 | | Will be replaced by Sisu GTP 4x4. |

=== Utility vehicles ===
| Model | Origin | Type | Quantity | Image | Details |
|---|---|---|---|---|---|
| Mercedes-Benz G-Class | Germany | Armoured utility vehicle Military ambulance | | | 4×4 and 6×6 versions in use. |
| Mercedes-Benz Sprinter | Germany | Van Ambulance Anti-aircraft command vehicle | | | |
| Volkswagen Transporter | Germany | Van | | | Used by military police. |
| Škoda Octavia | Czech Republic | Military police car | | | |
| Land Rover Defender 110 | United Kingdom | Utility vehicle | | | |
| Toyota Hilux | Japan | Pickup truck | | | |

=== All-terrain vehicles ===
| Model | Origin | Type | Quantity | Image | Details |
|---|---|---|---|---|---|
| BV206 D6N | Sweden | Tracked articulated all-terrain transport vehicle | 409 | | Some 274 have recently been purchased from Norway in several batches (49 in 2003, 123 in 2012 and another 171 in 2013, plus an additional 85 in 2014). |
| BV308 | Sweden | Tracked articulated all-terrain transport vehicle | 19 | | Some were included in the a joint purchase from Norway and Sweden (two batches, 123 in 2012 and another 171 in 2013). Troop transport, command, ambulance and transport pallet changer variants. |
| Polaris Sportsman 500/800 EFI Sportsman MV7 | United States | All-terrain vehicle | | | |
| Yamaha WR250R | Japan | Military motorcycle | | | |
| Lynx 49 Ranger ST 900 ACE | Finland | Snowmobile | | | |

=== Military engineering vehicles ===
| Model | Origin | Type | Quantity | Image | Details |
Recovery equipment
| Leopard 1A2 ARV | West Germany | Armoured recovery vehicle | 8 | | BPz-2 |
Engineering equipment
| Leopard 2R | Germany; Finland | Combat engineering vehicle | ? (6 in 2022) | | The vehicles were stored due to their unsuitability in Finnish terrain. All were donated to Ukraine in 2023. New vehicles have been purchased from Germany. |
| Leopard 1A2 AEV | West Germany | Combat engineering vehicle | 8 | | Pionierpanzer 1. |
| Leopard 2A4 with Urdan Mine Clearing Roller System (MCRS) | Germany; Israel | Mine clearing roller system (MCRS) | 6 | | |
| Sisu RA-140 DS | Finland | Mine clearing vehicle | | | |
| Mercedes-Benz Unimog U5000 | Germany | Engineering equipment vehicle | | | |
| Lännen 940 PS | Finland | Backhoe loader | | | |
| Liebherr 554 | Germany; Switzerland | Wheeled loader | | | |
| Liebherr R900 | Germany; Switzerland | Tracked excavator | | | |
| Liebherr 924 | Germany; Switzerland | Tracked excavator | | | |
| Liebherr 934 | Germany; Switzerland | Tracked excavator | | | |
Bridging vehicles
| Leopard 2L Leguan | Germany; Finland | Armoured vehicle-launched bridge | 10 (+6 on order) | | Six on order with deliveries in 2026–2028. |
| Sisu E15TP-L Leguan | Finland; Germany | Bridging vehicle | 9 | | |
| BLG-60M2 | East Germany; Poland | Armoured vehicle-launched bridge | 12 | | |
| PMP Pontoon bridge | Soviet Union | Pontoon bridge | | | Transported on Scania 8x8 truck, and moved on water by the Faster 670CAT bridge erection boats and Multi III Army auxiliary boats. |
Emergency equipment
| Saurus FLC 3 | Finland; Germany | Light rescue vehicle | | | Based on Mercedes-Benz Sprinter 519 CDI Oberaigner 6×6 |
| Scania P 370 | Sweden | Military medium heavy fire truck | | | |
| Ensihoitoasema, EHAS M2005 | Finland | Prehospital care mobile station | | | |
| Ensihoitopaikka, EHP | Finland | Prehospital care mobile place | | | |
CBRN equipment
| Saurus FDS 43/5 | Finland; Sweden | Decontamination vehicle | | | Customi×ed by Finnish contractor Saurus Oy using Swedish-built Scania P380CB 6×6HHZ/4400 chassis. |
| CBRN-kenttälaboratorio | Finland | Field laboratory | | | |
| CL-800 | Finland | Personnel decontamination container | | | |

== Field artillery ==
=== Towed field guns and howitzers ===
| Model | Origin | Type | Calibre | Quantity | Image | Details |
|---|---|---|---|---|---|---|
| 155 K 83-97 | Finland | Gun-howitzer | 155 mm L/39 | 113 | | Provides indirect fire support for various units and is used to form heavy artillery battalions under direct supreme HQ command. 155 K 83-97 is an upgrade of the existing 155 K 83. |
| 155 K 98 | Finland | Gun-howitzer | 155 mm L/52 | 56 | | Supports readiness brigades with indirect fire. Equipped with an auxiliary power unit for short distance movement adjustments. 155 K 98 is based on the earlier 155 K 83 with some major enhancements to both the breech and the barrel. |
| 122 H 63 | Soviet Union | Howitzer | 122 mm L/38 | 474 | | Soviet 2A18 (D-30). The main artillery support of Jaeger and infantry brigades as well as battlegroups. |
| 152 K 89 | Soviet Union | Field gun | 152 mm L/49 | 24 | | Soviet 2A36 Giatsint-B. Provides indirect fire support for Jaeger and infantry brigades as well as battlegroups. An unknown number was sent to help Ukraine's war efforts. |

=== Self-propelled artillery ===
| Model | Origin | Type | Calibre | Quantity | Image | Details |
|---|---|---|---|---|---|---|
| KRHPSAJON XA-361-AMOS | Finland; Sweden | Self-propelled gun-mortar | 120 mm L/25 | 18 | | 120mm twin-barrel Patria AMOS mortar on a Patria AMV platform. |
| 122 PSH 74 | Soviet Union | Self-propelled howitzer | 122 mm L/38 | 74(-38) | | Supports mechanised and motorised battle groups with indirect fire. Some were donated to Ukraine.: 38 moved to storage or donated to Ukraine |
| 155 PSH K9 | South Korea | Self-propelled howitzer | 155 mm L/52 | 96 (+112 on order) | | Supports mechanised and motorised battlegroups with indirect fire. Orders: First contract: 48 + 48 option; 48 ordered in 2017; 10 ordered from the option in 2021; 38 ordered in 2022; All 96 had been delivered as of late 2025 and entered operational service; Second contract: 112 surplus K9 ordered in April 2026; Expected to be completed by 2031; Note: all howitzers are former Korean surplus equipment |

=== Multiple rocket launchers ===
| Model | Origin | Type | Quantity | Image | Details |
|---|---|---|---|---|---|
| 122 RAKH 89 M1 | Czechoslovakia | Multiple rocket launcher | 35 | | Czechoslovak 122 mm self-propelled multiple rocket launcher, originally 36 units bought from East German stocks. Used to support mechanised and motorised units. In December 2022 Finland ordered long-range 122mm ACCULAR rockets from Israel for 70 million Euros. |
| 298 RSRAKH 06 | United States | Multiple rocket launcher | 41 | | M270D1 vehicles used for long-range strikes against enemy reserves, command posts, and combat support organisations up to operational depth at the point of main effort. 22 M270s were obtained from the Netherlands in 2007, an additional 12 from Denmark in 2014 and 6 from the US in 2014. All 41 to be upgraded to A2 versions, allowing them to fire Precision Strike Missiles.: M28 training rockets; AT2 anti-tank mine disperser rockets; M30A1 GMLRS-AW (150 pieces bought in 2016).; M31A1 GMLRS-U (90 pieces bought in 2016); M30A2 ER-GMLRS-AW and; M31A2 ER-GMLRS-U ordered in February 2022 for 70 MEUR.; The extended range rockets (ER) have a range of over 150 km. |

=== Forward observer vehicles ===
| Model | Origin | Type | Quantity | Image | Details |
|---|---|---|---|---|---|
| BMP-1 TJ | Soviet Union; Finland | Forward observation vehicle | 10 | | BMP-1 vehicles modified in Finland for use as forward observer vehicles. The turret and main gun are removed and replaced with observation devices in the TJ version. |
| BMP-1 TJJ | Soviet Union; Finland | Forward observation vehicle | 24 | | BMP-1 vehicles modified in Finland for use as forward observer vehicles. The TJJ version retains the original turret and main gun. |

=== Artillery radars ===
| Model | Origin | Type | Quantity | Image | Details |
|---|---|---|---|---|---|
| TYTKA 21 | Israel | Counter-battery radar | | | ELTA EL/M-2311, designated as TYTKA 21 ("Artillery Radar, model 2021"), C-band, 3D AESA, GaN based TRM. Ordered in 2019 and entered service in 2021. |

== Anti-aircraft systems ==
=== Surface-to-air missile systems ===
| Model | Origin | Type | Quantity | Image | Details |
|---|---|---|---|---|---|
| ITO 15 | United States | Man-portable air-defense system | 200 (+350 on order) | | FIM-92F Stinger-RMP Block I missiles. 171 Stinger-missiles were brought from Denmark to be used for training purposes. An additional 350 FIM-92K missile systems were ordered in December 2022. |
| ITO 05 ITO 05M | Germany; Sweden | Surface-to-air missile system | 16 86 | | ITO 05 (ASRAD-R) is a short-range, mobile air-defence system that holds four RBS 70 missiles at ready and protects the readiness brigades as well as the Capital Region. Every ITO 05 launch unit is paired with an ITO 05M MANPADS. ITO 05M also protects the readiness brigades' Jaeger and armoured battalions. A total of 450 Bolide missiles delivered. In December 2022 Finland ordered additional missiles for 76.6 million EUR. In 2026, the RBS 70 NG systems were acquired for SEK 1.2 billion (€108 million). |
| ITO 90M | France; United States | Surface-to-air missile system | 20 | | Crotale NG. Short-range, mobile all-weather weapon system that holds eight VT-1 missiles at ready and is used to protect targets and troops vital to national defence. 480 missiles delivered. Some launch units have been given to Ukraine. |
| ITO 12 NASAMS II FIN | Norway | Surface-to-air missile system | Eight batteries 24 launchers | | Medium-range, mobile air-defence system that holds six AIM-120 C-7 AMRAAM missiles at ready. They are primarily used to protect the Capital Region. Nasams 2 FIN configuration, also known as ITO 12. A battery has three firing units, and each firing unit has six missiles. The firing units are transported by a missile transporter, using an Sisu E13TP 8×8 all-terrain flat bed truck. The battery is led from an FDC (Fire Distribution Centre) command vehicle, using a Sisu A2045 4×4 all-terrain truck. Equipped with GPS-positioning system and three radios. Built by Insta Oy. The targets are found and tracked by a Thales Raytheon AN/MPQ-64F1 Improved Sentinel 3D targeting radar, equipped with an IFF-system. Additionally the battery has an electro-optical sensor vehicle, called MSP-600, which has a 3D-tracking Saphir-heat camera, ELEM laser distance measuring instrument that can measure up to 40 km, a Nedinsco camera for daytime use (10 × magnification) and a GPS positioning device. It is built onto a Mercedes-Benz G-series utility vehicle. Built by Finnish Defence Power Systems. |
| David's Sling | Israel | Surface-to-air missile system | | | Long-range, all-weather weapon system ordered on 5 April 2023. The main contract is valued at approximately 316 million Euros and includes further options worth 216 million Euros. |

=== Target acquisition radars ===
| Model | Origin | Type | Quantity | Image | Details |
|---|---|---|---|---|---|
| MOSTKA 87M | Sweden | Target acquisition radar | | | Saab Giraffe Mk IV, designated as MOSTKA 87M ("Target Acquisition Radar, model 1987, modernised"). Installed on a modified XA-180 chassis. |
| MOSTKA 12 | United States | Target acquisition radar | | | AN/MPQ-64 Sentinel for the NASAMS. |

=== Anti-aircraft artillery ===
| Model | Origin | Type | Quantity | Image | Details |
|---|---|---|---|---|---|
| 23 ITK 95 23 ITK 61 | Soviet Union | Twin-barreled AA autocannon | 45 1100 | | Commonly known as "Sergei". ITK 61 is the Soviet ZU-23-2, while the ITK 95 is a Finnish modernised variant, where the gun is gyro-stabilised and has an auxiliary power unit, a laser range finder and a digital fire-control system. An undisclosed amount of 23 ITK 61s have been donated to Armed Forces of Ukraine as military aid following Russian invasion of Ukraine 2022. |
| 35 ITK 88 | Switzerland | Twin-barreled AA autocannon | 16 | | Originally 35 ItK 58. 35 ItK 88 is a modernised Oerlikon KD that incorporates features such as a digital fire-control system, automatic re-loading and, since the 2000s, a new radar system. |
| ITPSV Leopard 2 Marksman | Germany; United Kingdom; Finland | Self-propelled, twin-barreled AA autocannon Training vehicle | 6 1 | | The Marksman turrets were moved from T-55AM chassis to Leopard 2 chassis in 2014 and 2015. In service use from 2016 onward. |

== Logistics ==
| Model | Origin | Type | Quantity | Image | Details |
Trucks
| Leyland-DAF MMLS | United Kingdom | 8×6 truck | 125 units | | A total of 125 surplus vehicles acquired from the UK in 2017–18. |
| Mercedes-Benz Actros | Germany | Heavy truck | | | Additional order in 2022 to Veho Oy Ab for 135 trucks equipped with MULTILIFT Ultima 21Z hooklifts and 7 equipped with HIAB X-HiDuo 188 loader cranes. |
| Mercedes-Benz Actros 4160 | Germany | 8×4 semi-truck | | | |
| Mercedes-Benz Atego | Germany | 4×4 general-purpose truck | | | |
| Mercedes-Benz Arocs 4452 | Germany | 8×4 truck | | | |
| Mercedes-Benz Zetros 1833 | Germany | 4×4 offroad truck | 60+ units | | 60 ordered in 2020 |
| Scania 114C Scania 114G | Sweden | 6×4 heavy truck | | | |
| Scania 124G | Sweden | 6×4 heavy truck | | | |
| Scania G460 | Sweden | 8×8 heavy truck | | | |
| Scania G480 | Sweden | 6×4 heavy truck | | | |
| Scania G490 | Sweden | 6×4 heavy truck | | | |
| Scania P380 | Sweden | 4×4 truck | | | |
| Scania P420 | Sweden | 6×4 heavy truck | | | |
| Scania R144G | Sweden | 8×4 heavy truck | | | |
| Scania R164C Scania R164G | Sweden | 8×4 heavy truck | | | |
| Scania R470 | Sweden | 6×4 heavy truck | | | |
| Scania R480 | Sweden | 8×4 heavy truck | | | |
| Scania R500 | Sweden | 6×4 heavy truck | | | |
| Scania R500 | Sweden | 8×4 heavy truck | | | |
| Scania T144 | Sweden | 6×4 heavy truck | 10 | | Ten surplus vehicles bought from Belgium in 2017. Used for heavy transport, e.g. road transport of Leopard 2 tanks. |
| Sisu A2045 | Finland | 4×4 general-purpose truck | 232 | | A total of 232 vehicles for delivery 2009–2010 with an option for an additional 240 vehicles to be bought after 2010. |
| Sisu E11T | Finland | 6×6 towed artillery mover 8×8 heavy transport Airfield crash tender Catapult vehicle | | | |
| Sisu E13TP | Finland | 8×8 heavy transport | 60 units | | Armoured cabin. |
| Sisu SA-150 | Finland | 4×4 offroad truck | | | Nicknamed "Masi" |
| Sisu SA-240 | Finland | 6×6 offroad truck | | | Nicknamed "Rasi" |
| Sisu SK181 MIL | Finland | 4×4 general-purpose truck | | | |
| Tatra 815 | Czech Republic | 8×8 heavy truck | | | |
Tractors
| Valtra N163 Direct | Finland | 4×2 tractor with trailer | 106 | | |
| Valtra N174 Active | Finland | 4×2 tractor with trailer | 77 (ordered) | | FMG hooklift trailer to transport ammunition, but also usable as forklift, snowplough or grader |
| Kerberos | Finland | Multi-purpose tractor trailer | | | Among the equipment included is the M20 mine emplacement drill. |
Logistics handling
| LM Trac 687 | Finland | Wheeled loader | | | |
Trailers
| Närko 3-axle trailer | Finland | Trailer | | | |
| Närko 4-axle trailer | Finland | Swap-body trailer | 140 | | 140 ordered in 2014, delivered by 2017. |

== Infantry weapons ==
=== Pistols ===
| Model | Origin | Type | Quantity | Image | Details |
|---|---|---|---|---|---|
| 9.00 PIST 2008 | Austria | Pistol | | | Glock 17 with specially made RTF2 checkering texture around the grip, 20 N (4.5 lb_{f}) trigger pull, self illuminating tritium sights and a 17+1-round magazine. Used by military police. |
| 9.00 PIST 80–91 | Belgium | Pistol | | | FN HP-DA. Standard issue pistol for military police conscripts. |
| 9.00 PIST 2003 | Germany | Pistol | | | Walther P99. Used by special forces and military police. |
| 9.00 PIST SIG P226; 9.00 PIST SIG P225 | Germany | Pistol | | | SIG Sauer P226 and the shorter variant P225. Used by crisis management troops. |

=== Assault rifles ===
| Model | Origin | Type | Quantity | Image | Details |
|---|---|---|---|---|---|
| 7.62 RK 62; 7.62 RK 62 TP; 7.62 RK 62 76; 7.62 RK 62 76 TP; 7.62 RK 62 M1; 7.62 RK 62 M2; 7.62 RK 62 M3 | Finland | Assault rifle | 350,000 | | Standard issue assault rifle. [Top] RK 62 with later version pistol grip and handguard. [Middle upper] RK 62 76 with an older stamped steel magazine. [Middle] RK 62 M1 - the baseline modification with a telescoping stock and mounting rails for optical sights and tactical lights as well as some other small improvements. [Middle lower] RK 62 M2 - front handguard with M-LOK rail interface, Ase Utra BoreLock flash hider, suppressor/rebar cutter (the two latter not pictured), surface manganese phosphated. [Bottom] RK 62 M3 - Identical to the M2 version, but treated in green Cerakote. |
| 7.62 RK 95 TP | Finland | Assault rifle | 20,000 | | Modernised standard assault rifle. |
| 5.56 RK SCAR | Belgium | Assault rifle | 300–500 | | FN SCAR-L, used by special forces. |
| 7.62 RK 72; 7.62 RK 72 TP | East Germany | Assault rifle | 100,000 | | East German made AKM (MPi-KM fixed stock and MPi-KMS-72 folding stock variants). Purchased in the 1990s in large numbers for reserve troops. Folding stock version is used by various tank, APC and IFV crewmen. |
| 7.62 RK 56 TP | China | Assault rifle | 100,000 | | Type 56-2, Chinese-made folding stock AK type rifles, purchased in the 1990s in large numbers for reserve troops, now in long-term storage. |
| 7.62 RK 54; 7.62 RK 54 TP | Soviet Union | Assault rifle | ~ 40,000 | | Soviet AK-47 and its folding stock variant AKS-47. Purchased in late 1950s and early 1960s to introduce the Kalashnikov type assault rifle to FDF use before sufficient amount of RK 62 were produced. Now in long-term storage. Some were also included in the arms purchases from ex-DDR stocks, in the form of MPi-K (Soviet-made AK-47, also named RK 54 in Finnish service) and MPi-KmS (GDR-made AKS-47, also named RK 54 TP in Finnish service). |

=== Battle rifles ===
| Model | Origin | Type | Quantity | Image | Details |
|---|---|---|---|---|---|
| 7.62 KIV 23 | Finland | Designated marksman rifle | | | Sako M23, delivered in 2022. Equipped with Trijicon VCOG 1-6×24 |

=== Precision rifles ===
| Model | Origin | Type | Quantity | Image | Details |
|---|---|---|---|---|---|
| 7.62 TKIV 23 | Finland | Sniper rifle | | | Sako M23, to be delivered in 2022. Initial order for 10 MEUR. Equipped with Steiner M7Xi 2.9–20×50 sight. |
| TRG-21 | Finland | Sniper rifle | | | Sako TRG-21. For marksmanship competition shooting. Doesn't have a specific name within the FDF standard naming system. |
| 7.62 TKIV 85 | Finland | Sniper rifle | | | Equipped with Zeiss Diavari ZA 1.5–6×42 or Schmidt & Bender 4×36 sight. |
| 7.62 TKIV Dragunov | Soviet Union | Sniper rifle | | | Equipped with 4×24 PSO-1 sight. |
| 8.6 TKIV 2000 | Finland | Sniper rifle | | | Sako TRG-42. Equipped with Zeiss Diavari V 3–12×56T sight. |
| 8.6 TKIV M10 | Finland | Sniper rifle | | | Sako TRG M10 in .338 Lapua Magnum, with 7.62 NATO calibre change kits for training. Order for 11 MEUR in February 2023. Optical sight Steiner M7Xi 2,9-20×50 |
| 12.7 RSTKIV 2000 | United States | Anti-materiel rifle | | | Barrett M82A1. |
| 12.7 TKIV 2000 | United States | Anti-materiel rifle | | | Barrett M95. |

=== Submachine guns ===
| Model | Origin | Type | Quantity | Image | Details |
|---|---|---|---|---|---|
| 9.00 KP 2000 | Germany | Submachine gun | | | Heckler & Koch MP5A5. Used by special forces. |
| 9.00 KP 2000 VAIM | Germany | Submachine gun | | | Heckler & Koch MP5SD6. Used by special forces. |

=== Support weapons ===
| Model | Origin | Type | Quantity | Image | Details |
Standard support weapons
| 7.62 KVKK 62 | Finland | Light machine gun | 6,500 | | Standard light machine gun. |
| 7.62 KK PKM; 7.62 KK PKM PICA; 7.62 KK PKT | Soviet Union; Russia | General-purpose machine gun | | | Standard general-purpose machine gun. 7.62 KK PKT is used in all IFVs in the Finnish army. |
| 12.7 ITKK 96 | Soviet Union | Standard heavy machine gun | 5,000+ | | Soviet NSV machine gun; standard heavy machine gun. |
Specialised support weapons
| 7.62 PSVKK MAG | Belgium | General-purpose machine gun | | | Light armament on Leopard 2A6 tanks. |
| FN Minimi | Belgium | General-purpose machine gun | | | Used by special forces. |
| 7.62 KK MG3 | West Germany | General-purpose machine gun | | | Light armament on Leopard 2A4 tanks and NH90 helicopters. |
| 12.7 RSKK 2005 | United States | Heavy machine gun | | | Found on the Patria AMVs Kongsberg weapon turrets. M2 Browning heavy machine gun. |
| 7.62 KK Dillon | United States | Rotary machine gun | | | M134D-H Minigun. Used as light armament on NH90 helicopters by the Utti Jaeger Regiment. |
| 40 KRKK 2005 | Germany | Grenade machine gun | | | |
| 40 KRPIST 2002 | Germany | Grenade launcher | | | |

=== Shotguns ===
| Model | Origin | Type | Quantity | Image | Details |
|---|---|---|---|---|---|
| 12 HAUL REM 870 | United States | Shotgun | | | Standard shotgun. |

=== Mortars ===
| Model | Origin | Type | Quantity | Image | Details |
|---|---|---|---|---|---|
| 120 KRH M3 | Finland | Mortar carrier | 100+ | | The M3 mortar system (M3 = Modular Mobile Mortar) had been employed since the beginning of 2026. An order for 100+ systems and an additional option for "several hundreds of systems" was placed in September 2026. |
| ATARV TEKA | Finland | Ammunition carrier | 14 | | Sisu NA-123 GT ammunition carrier variant of the Sisu NA-120 series tracked articulated vehicles. |
| 120 KRH TEKA | Finland | Mortar carrier | 27 | | Sisu NA-122 GT mortar carrier variant of the Sisu NA-120 series tracked articulated vehicles. |
| 81 KRH TEKA BV | Sweden; Finland | Mortar carrier | | | A light mortar carrier variant of the Hägglunds BV206 D6N tracked articulated vehicle. The British L16 81mm mortars originally mounted on the carrier vehicle have been replaced with the 81 KRH 71 Y, with the L16 having been stored as infantry mortars under the designation 81 KRH 13. |
| 120 KRH M3 | Finland | Mortar carrier module | | | Patria TREMOS, a mortar carrier module, which can be mounted on a multitude of military vehicles. Pre-series ordered with delivery in 2025. |
| 120 KRH 65 Y 120 KRH 65 73 | Finland | Mortar | 15 | | Old Tampella heavy infantry mortar. A total of 15 were manufactured with an amphibious floating carriage in 1965 and more with a new carriage in 1974. In long-term storage. |
| 120 KRH 85; 120 KRH 85 92 | Finland | Mortar | 60 | | Tampella heavy infantry mortar model 1985. To be withdrawn from service when barrels wear out. Undisclosed amount of 120 KRH 85 92 has been donated to Armed Forces of Ukraine as military aid following Russian invasion of Ukraine 2022. |
| 120 KRH 92; 120 KRH 92 76 | Finland | Mortar | 822^{a} | | Standard issue Finnish Tampella lightweight heavy infantry mortar. Old 120 KRH 40 were withdrawn from service and scrapped when the 120 KRH 92 were acquired. There are some units that have old parts such as base plates, carriages or bipods, and these are either listed as KRH 92 such as the KRH 92 76, or as upgrades of their own base model like the KRH 85 92 (in FDF nomenclature the first number defines the model and second the submodel).^aTotal number of all 120 KRH is 822, the KRH 92 number here is that minus the known orders for KRH 65 and KRH 85. |
| 81 KRH 71 Y | Finland | Mortar | | | Standard issue Finnish Tampella light infantry mortar. |
| 81 KRH 96 | Finland | Mortar | 550 | | 81 KRH 71 Y with an improved baseplate designed after the 120 KRH 92 baseplate, manufactured by Vammas. |
| 81 KRH 13 | United Kingdom | Mortar | | | British L16 81 mm mortars removed from the BV206 D6N mortar carriers. Few in number, in long-term storage. |

=== Anti-armour ===
| Model | Origin | Type | Quantity | Image | Details |
Unguided systems
| 66 KES 12 PST; 66 KES 12 RAK | United States; Norway | Recoilless launcher | 70,000 | | M72 EC LAW Mk.I (66 KES 12 PST) HEAT and M72 ASM RC (66 KES 12 RAK) aluminised HE (anti-structure) variants. Colloquially known as kessi. In September 2022 Finland ordered more 66 KES 12 for €58 million. |
| AT4 | Sweden | Recoilless launcher | Unknown | | Order in February 2023 for €46 million (includes NLAW and AT-4). |
| Carl Gustaf M4 | Sweden | Recoilless launcher | Unknown | | Order in February 2023 for €46 million (includes NLAW and AT-4). Used by special forces. |
| 112 RSKES APILAS | France | Recoilless launcher | <39,000 units | | Portable one-shot 112 mm recoilless anti-tank launcher. Colloquially known as jumppaputki ("Gym tube"). Will be taken out of service in the 2020s. Bought in 1986 for 290 MFIM (approx €48.8M) with a reported unit price of 2,000 EUR per unit. A follow-up order was done in 1990 for 149 MFIM (€25M). |
| RGW 110 | Germany | Rocket launcher | Order for €84.5M | | 110mm recoilless anti-tank launcher. Ordered in large numbers and they are to be taken into use around 2027. |
Guided systems
| 102 RSLPSTOHJ NLAW | Sweden; United Kingdom | Anti-tank guided missile | 3,000-10,000 | | Disposable, man-portable, short range predicted line of sight missile system. 1,500 ordered in 2007 1,000 ordered in 2015 500 ordered in 2017 Order in February 2023 for €46 million. |
| PSTOHJ 2000; PSTOHJ 2000M; PSTOHJ 2000 LR2 | Israel; Germany | Anti-tank guided missile | 140; 45 | | Israeli Spike missile, MR and LR variants, some of them are made in Germany by Diehl Defence. 140 Spike-MR launch units, 500 Spike-MR missiles. 45 GILL launchers were purchased from the Netherlands in 2013. These were modified by the Finns to Spike-LR. The Finnish Navy operates also Spike-ER under the designation RO 06 (18 launch units). 400 Spike-ER missiles. In December 2022, Finland ordered Spike SR, LR2 and ER2 missiles, the ER2s for the Navy. |
| PSTOHJ SR | Israel | Anti-tank guided missile | | | Spike SR missiles bought in 2022. |

=== Land mines ===
| Model | Origin | Type | Quantity | Image | Details |
|---|---|---|---|---|---|
| REP 12 | Finland | Anti-handling device | | | Anti-handling device for anti-tank mines. The device is laid under the anti-tank mines and explodes when the mine above is removed. |
| VP 88 | Finland | Directional mine | | | Anti-personnel directional charge with 0.9 kg hexotol (a mixture of hexogen (RDX) and TNT similar to Composition B). Very similar to the American M18 Claymore mine. |
| VP 2010 | Finland | Directional mine | | | Anti-personnel directional charge with 1.3 kg FPX R1 (PBX type) explosive. |
| TM 65 77 | Finland | Anti-tank mine | | | Blast mine with 9.5 kg TNT and a pressure fuse. |
| MHPM 12 | Finland | Anti-tank mine | | | 11.4 kg mine, with 6.9 kg either East German or Finnish made TM-62 explosive, and a Finnish multiple sensor fuse. |
| POM 87 | Finland | Anti-tank mine | | | Shaped charge mine with 4 kg hexotol. Magnetic and seismic sensor fuse. |
| POM 87 94 | Finland | Anti-tank mine | | | Shaped charge mine with 4 kg hexotol. Magnetic and seismic sensor fuze, main explosive is similar to POM 87 but the fuse can also be programmed with a run-over counter and for self-deactivation. |
| KP 81 | Finland | Anti-vehicle mine | | | Off-route EFP anti-vehicle mine with 12 kg hexotol. |
| KP 87 | Finland | Anti-vehicle mine | | | Off-route EFP anti-vehicle mine with 1.6 kg hexotol. |
| VP 84 | Austria | Anti-vehicle mine | | | Anti-vehicle directional fragmentation mine with 11.5 kg hexotol. Used against lightly armored vehicles. |
| VP 01 | | Anti-vehicle mine | | | Anti-vehicle directional fragmentation mine with 10.3 kg Composition B. Used against lightly armored vehicles. |

=== Hand grenades ===
| Model | Origin | Type | Quantity | Image | Details |
|---|---|---|---|---|---|
| Sirpalekäsikranaatti M43 | Finland | Fragmentation grenade | | | Simplified version of the Sirpalekäsikranaatti M41. Consist of a cylindrical cast iron shell with vertical grooves and a 60 g cylindrical explosive, the same shape which is used as the detonator in TM 65 77 or the now defunct anti-personnel mines. Uses either the fuse M83 or M95, both being 3.5 second. |
| Sirpalekäsikranaatti M50 | Finland | Fragmentation grenade | | | Made from 50 mm mortar shells, and equipped with a new JVA 1634 fuze. |
| Sirpalekäsikranaatti M95 | Finland | Fragmentation grenade | | | Commercially Nammo HGF165-3,5. Spherical prefragmented steel shell and a 165 g explosive. Uses the 3.5 second fuse M95. |
| Painekäsikranaatti M99 | Finland | Concussion grenade | | | Commercially Nammo HGO225-3,5. Consist of a cylindrical plastic shell and a 225 g cylindrical explosive. Uses the 3.5 second fuse M95. |
| Fosforikäsikranaatti | Finland | Incendiary grenade | | | Phosphorus hand grenade. Uses either the fuse M83 or M95, both being 3.5 second. |
| Paukkuvaloheite 2 | Finland | Stun grenade | | | Stun grenade. |
| Paukkuvaloheite 7 | Finland | Stun grenade | | | Stun grenade. |
| Savuheite 80-16 | Finland | Smoke grenade | | | Grey smoke grenade. |
| Merkkisavuheite 80-16 | Finland | Smoke grenade | | | Coloured marker smoke grenade. |
| 2 savurasia 83-16 | Finland | Smoke grenade | | | 2 kg grey smoke canister. |

== Infantry equipment ==
| Model | Origin | Type | Quantity | Image | Details |
Combat uniforms
| Taisteluasujärjestelmä M05 | Finland | Combat uniform system | | | |
| Taistelupaita M11 | Finland | Combat shirt | | | |
| Taisteluasujärjestelmä M23 | Norway | Combat uniform system | | | Nordic Combat Uniform |
Load bearing equipment
| Taisteluvyö M85 | Finland | Load bearing equipment | | | Supplied by Finn-Savotta. |
| Kantolaitejärjestelmä M05 | Finland | Load bearing equipment | | | Supplied by Finn-Savotta. |
| Taskusarja M23 | Finland | Load bearing equipment | | | Supplied by Finn-Savotta. |
Body armour
| Sirpalesuojaliivi M91 | Finland | Flak jacket | | | |
| Sirpalesuojaliivi M05 | Finland | Flak jacket | | | |
| Luotisuojaliivi M05 | Finland | Body armour | | | |
| Luotisuojaliivi M10 | Finland | Body armour | | | |
| Luotisuojaliivi M13 | Finland | Plate carrier | | | |
| Luotisuojaliivi M17 | Finland | Plate carrier | | | Supplied by C.P.E. Production and Finn-Savotta. |
Helmets
| Kypärä M92 | Finland | Combat helmet | | | Finnish FY-Composites helmet |
| Kypärä M2000 | Finland | Combat helmet | | | Finnish FY-Composites helmet |
| Kypärä M2005 | Finland | Combat helmet | | | Finnish FY-Composites helmet |
| Taistelijan kypärä M20 | United States | Combat helmet | | | Ops-Core FAST XP High Cut |
| Taistelijan kypärä M23 | Canada | Combat helmet | | | Galvion Caiman, ordered in 2022 via NSPA. |
Other personal equipment
| Taistelijan reppu M20 | Finland | Backpack | | | |
| Suojanaamari M20 | United Kingdom | Respirator gas mask | | | |
| Suojanaamari M95 | United Kingdom | Respirator gas mask | | | |
Optical sights
| Punapistetähtäin 2004 | Sweden | Red dot sight | | | Aimpoint CS |
| Punapistetähtäin 2009 | Sweden | Red dot sight | | | Aimpoint CompM4 |
| Punapistetähtäin 2016 | Sweden | Red dot sight | | | Aimpoint Micro T-2 |
| Lisäoptiikka 3× | Sweden | Sight magnifier | | | Aimpoint 3×-P magnifier, to be used with the Aimpoint Micro T-2 |
| Kiväärikaukoputki 2004 | United States | Telescopic sight | | | Trijicon ACOG TA11FIN |
| Kiväärikaukoputki 2014 RK Kiväärikaukoputki 2014 PKM | Germany | Telescopic sight | | | Zeiss/Hensoldt ZO 4×30i |
Electronic equipment
| Valonvahvistin M20 | Finland | Image intensifier | | | Senop EVA 40 |
| Johtajan lasertähtäin M20 | Finland | Tactical laser sight | | | Senop LUKE (leader laser sight) |
| Taistelijan lasertähtäin M20 | Finland | Tactical laser sight | | | Senop LUKE (soldier laser sight) |
| Asevalaisin M20 | United States | Weapon light | | | |
| Kypärävalo M20 | United States | Helmet light | | | |
| Merkinantovalo M20 | United States | IFF strobe light | | | |
| Tunnistemerkkisarja M20 | Finland | Identification patches | | | |
| MPL21 | Finland | Target acquisition device | | | Senop LILLY |
| MPL15 | Finland | Target acquisition device | | | Senop LISA |

== Aircraft ==
=== Unmanned aerial vehicles ===
| Model | Origin | Type | Role | In service | Image | Details |
|---|---|---|---|---|---|---|
| Aeronautics Defense Orbiter | Israel | UAV, fixed-wing, FLIR (Forward-looking infrared) | ISTAR (Intelligence, surveillance, target acquisition, and reconnaissance) | 250 | | A total of 55 systems with a total of drones. |
| RUAG Ranger | Israel; Switzerland | UAV, fixed-wing, FLIR (Forward-looking infrared) | ISTAR (Intelligence, surveillance, target acquisition, and reconnaissance) | 11 | | |
| Parrot ANAFI USA | France; United States | Mini-UAV, Multicopter | ISR Intelligence, surveillance and reconnaissance | | | First purchase in a 2023 worth €2.6 million. |
| Parrot ANAFI UKR | France; United States; Finland | Mini-UAV, Multicopter | ISR Intelligence, surveillance and reconnaissance | | | Order in December 2025 worth €15 million, more advanced than the USA variant. |
| Insta FPV | Finland | FPV multirotor UAV | Training | | | Finnish-manufactured FPV drones scheduled for introduction across all Finnish Army units in 2027. |
| Perennial Autonomy Bumblebee | | AI-assisted UAV | Training | | | Scheduled for introduction in 2027. Intended to reduce the training time required for reservists. |
| Perennial Autonomy Hornet | | Armed UAV | Armed drone training | | | Armed drone intended for longer-range missions. Scheduled for introduction into training in 2027. |
| Merops AS3 | | Counter-UAV interceptor drone | Drone interception | | | Acquired by the Finnish Army for counter-drone operations. |
| DJI Mavic Pro Platinum | China | Mini-UAV, Multicopter | Training and ISR Intelligence, surveillance and reconnaissance | 150 | | 150 systems |

=== Army aviation ===
| Model | Origin | Type | Variant | In service | Image | Details |
|---|---|---|---|---|---|---|
| NHIndustries NH90 | France; Germany; Italy; Netherlands | Transport helicopter | NH90 TTH | 20 | | Operated by the Utti Jaeger Regiment. |
| McDonnell Douglas MD 500 Defender | United States | Utility helicopter | MD 500D | 2 | | Operated by the Utti Jaeger Regiment. |
| McDonnell Douglas MD 500 Defender | United States | Utility helicopter | MD 500E | 5 | | Operated by the Utti Jaeger Regiment. |

== See also ==
- List of former equipment of the Finnish Army
