= Multi-spectral camouflage =

Camouflage designed to work at multiple frequencies, not just visible light

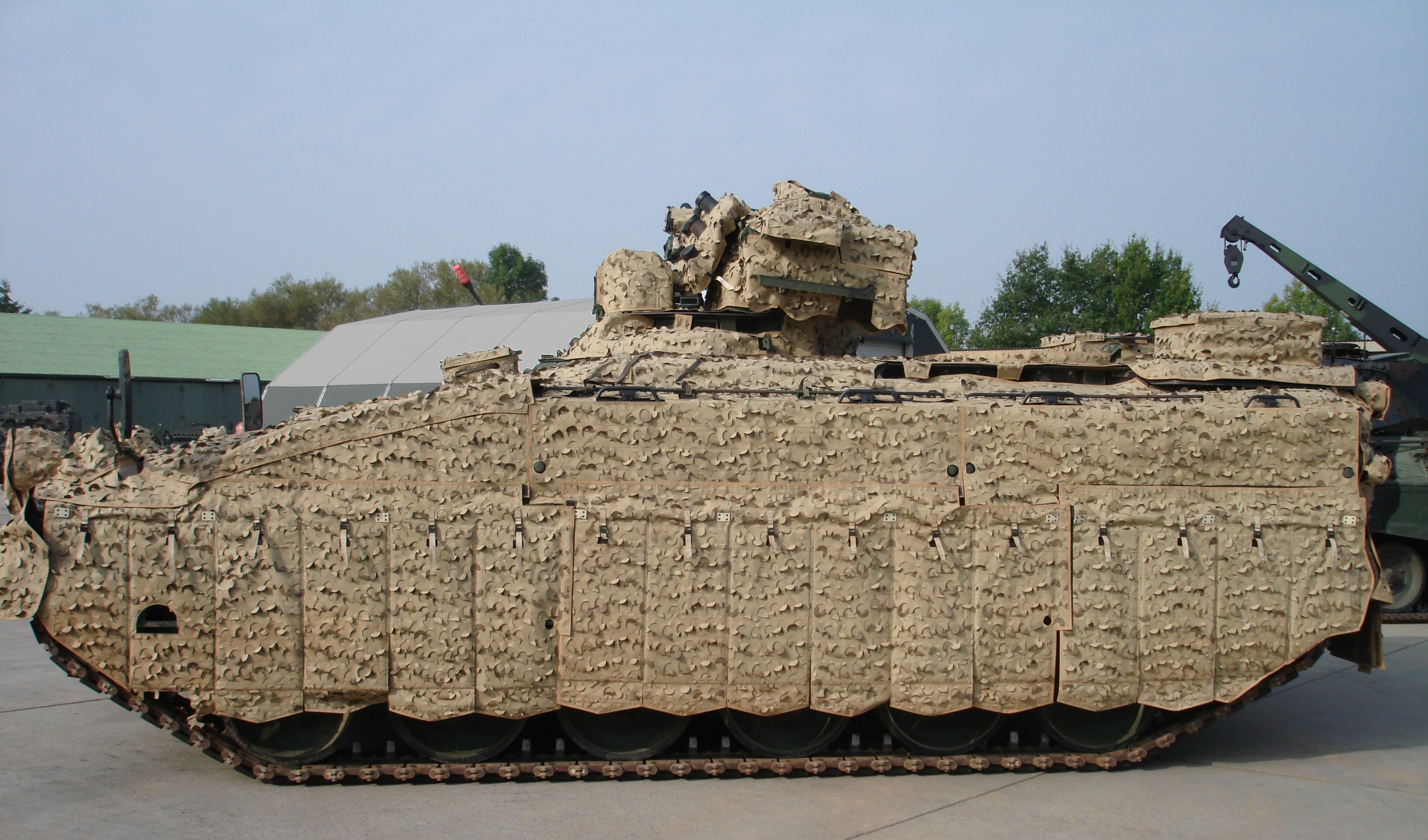
German Marder 1A5 with Saab Barracuda mobile multi-spectral camouflage

Multi-spectral camouflage is the use of counter-surveillance techniques to conceal objects from detection across several parts of the electromagnetic spectrum at the same time. While traditional military camouflage attempts to hide an object in the visible spectrum, multi-spectral camouflage also tries to simultaneously hide objects from detection methods such as infrared, radar, and millimetre-wave radar imaging.

Among animals, both insects such as the eyed hawk-moth, and vertebrates such as tree frogs possess camouflage that works in the infra-red as well as in the visible spectrum.

== History ==
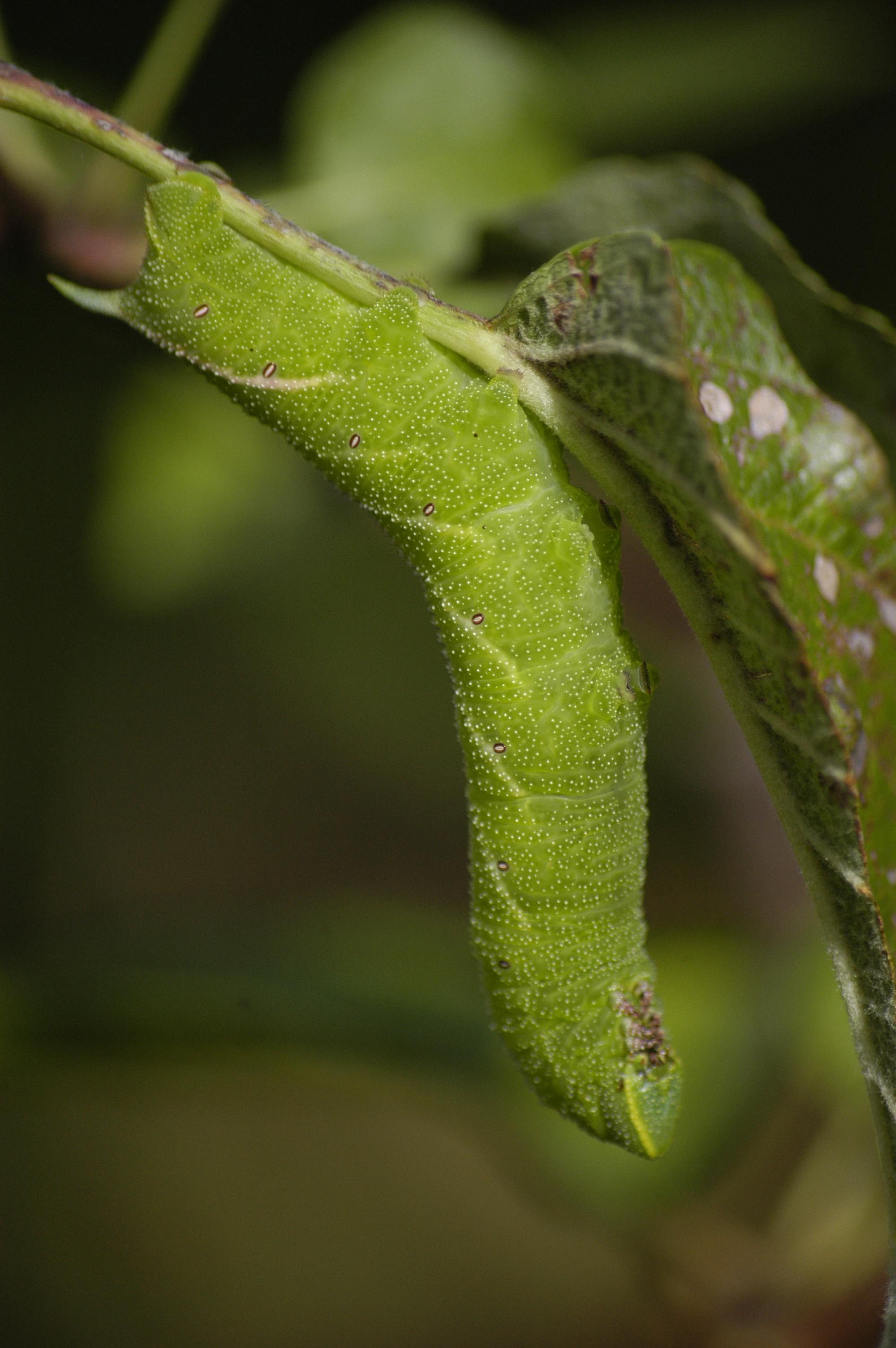
The caterpillar of the eyed hawk-moth Smerinthus ocellatus is camouflaged to match a leafy background in both visible and infra-red light.

The English zoologist Hugh Cott, in his 1940 book Adaptive Coloration in Animals, wrote that some caterpillars such as the eyed hawk-moth Smerinthus ocellatus, and tree frogs such as the red-snouted treefrog Hyla coerulea, are coloured so as to blend with their backgrounds whether observed in visible light or in infra-red. Cott noted the importance of camouflage in the infra-red, given the ability of tactical reconnaissance to observe in this part of the spectrum:

Because such screens are effective against direct observation and ordinary photography, by no means does it follow that they will be hidden in the infra-red photograph. Comparison of aerial photographs taken simultaneously on panchromatic and infra-red plates will reveal much that before the advent of this new technique would have been adequately camouflaged...

— Hugh Cott, 1940.

A German-led NATO research project concluded in 2004 that while "the multispectral signatures of most military equipment can be significantly reduced by combinations of various camouflage materials", multi-spectral camouflage for individual soldiers remained lacking. The main problems identified were operational constraints such as mobility, weight, and the soldier's physiology.

== Camouflage ==
Multi-spectral camouflage can be applied to individuals, to vehicles, and to buildings. It can take the form of specialised paints or camouflage nets that provide conventional camouflage, reduce the amount of heat given off by an object, and alter the shape and size of its radar signature. The Saab Barracuda Mobile Camouflage System provides a degree of concealment in the visible, thermal infrared, and radar parts of the electromagnetic spectrum, as does the Miranda Berberys-R multispectral camouflage system from Poland. Similarly, other companies such as the American-Israeli Fibrotex and Ametrine, and the Greek Intermat Defence proposed their own products ranging from static vehicle camouflage fabric to multispectral spray paints.

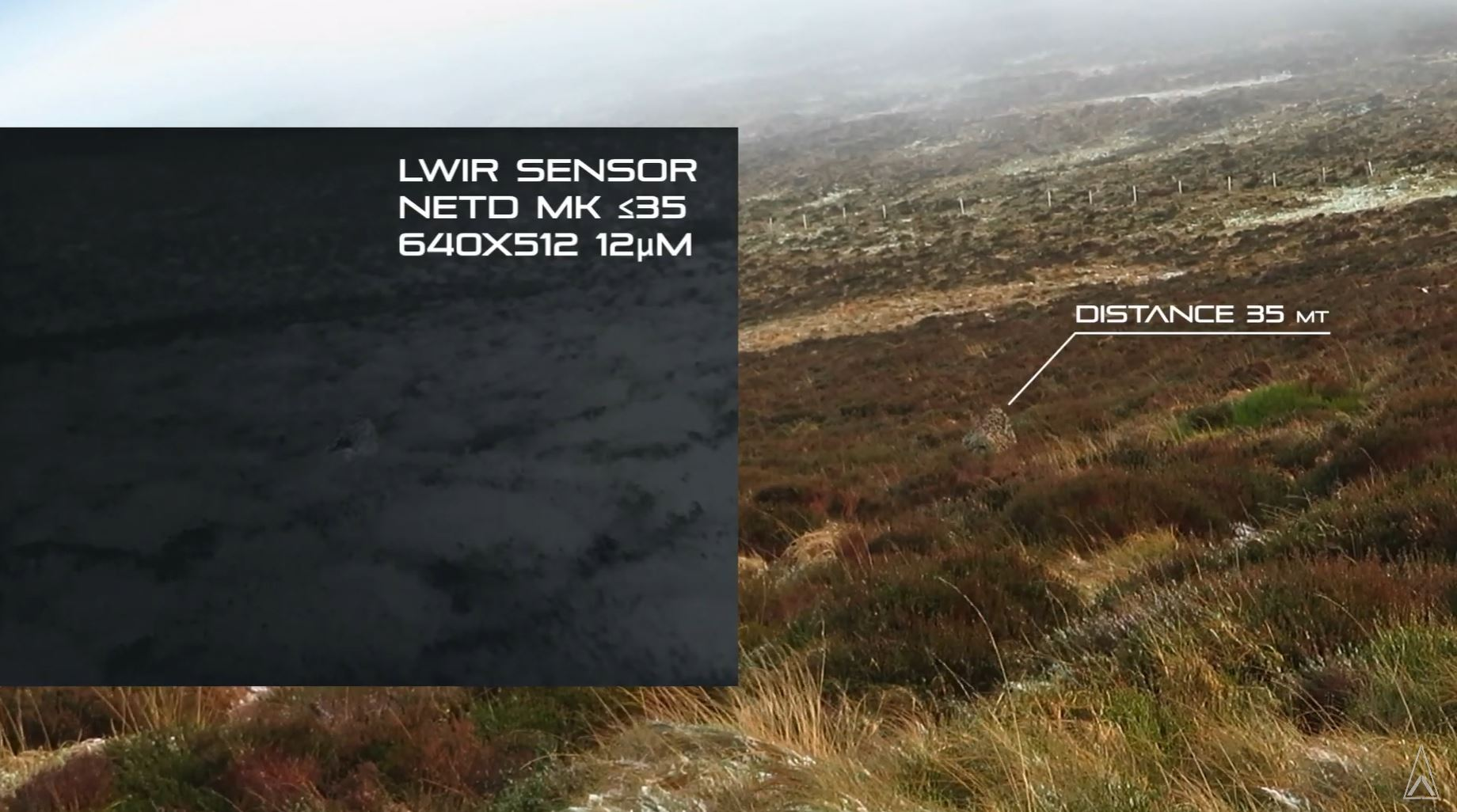
An example of individual multispectral camouflage. The showcased suit provides simultaneous camouflage in the VIS and LWIR wavelengths of the electromagnetic spectrum. The soldier's thermal signature matches the surrounding environment. Credits: ProApto Camouflage

Saab AB began offering a multi-spectral personal camouflage system known as the Special Operations Tactical Suit (SOTACS) as early as 2005. And as of 2018, multiple countries are phasing out legacy camouflage systems with multi-spectral systems.

In 2024, IIT Kanpur introduced Anālakṣhya, a Meta-material Surface Cloaking System (MSCS). The Meta-material Microwave Absorber improves stealth capabilities against Synthetic Aperture Radar (SAR) imaging by wave absorption across a wide spectrum. In the last decade other companies developed their own individual multispectral camouflage, such as the Israeli SpectralX (former Polaris Solutions), the German Phantom Leaf, the American Relv Camo, and the Italian ProApto. The latter developed the first Italian patent regarding multispectral camouflage and specifically focuses on 3D individual camouflage, producing multispectral Ghillie Suits designed also for amphibious operations and both tropical and arctic environments.

== Examples across the electromagnetic spectrum ==
Electromagnetic spectrum
Name	Wavelength	Detected by	Camouflage Technology	Example application
Ultraviolet	10 nm – 380 nm			
Visible light	380 nm – 700 nm	Eyes, cameras	Paint, nets, counter-illumination	Uniforms
Shorter Infrared	700 nm – 3 μm	Image intensifiers		
Mid or Thermal infrared	3 μm – 8 μm	Heat-seeking missile		
Long infrared	8 μm – 15 μm	Thermal imaging sensor	Peltier cooling plates	Adaptiv
Far infrared	15 μm – 1 mm			
Microwave	1 mm – 1 m	Radar	Stealth technology	Northrop Grumman B-2 Spirit, F-117 Nighthawk
Longer Radio waves	1 m – 100,000 km			

== Problems and Limitations ==
As this type of camouflage hinders electromagnetic radiation, radio-communications and GPS are also hindered. This can be overcome by using frequency selective surfaces, allowing specific frequencies to pass through.

In addition, multispectral camouflage effectiveness depends on many factors including environmental conditions, global electromagnetic irradiance, the kind of environment (urban and human artefacts VS natural environments) and individual variations related to physical conditioning and clothing layering (particularly in matter of human thermal concealment).

== See also ==
- Multispectral image
- Electro-optical MASINT
