= 81 KRH 71 Y =

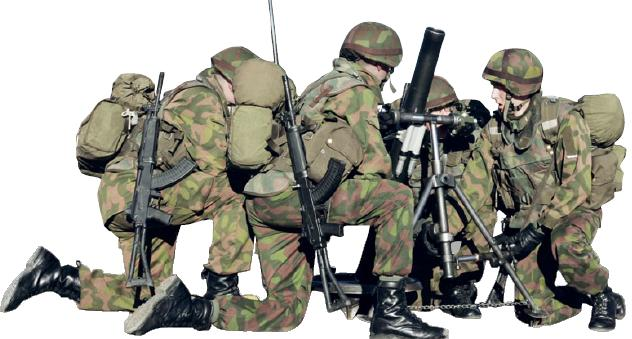
- Type: Mortar
- Place of origin: Finland

Service history
- Used by: Finland

Production history
- Designer: Tampella
- Manufacturer: Tampella (81 KRH 71); Vammas (81 KRH 96)
- No. built: 550 (81 KRH 96)
- Variants: 81 KRH 71 Y 81 KRH 71 RT; 81 KRH 96

Specifications
- Mass: 56 kg (123 lb)
- Barrel length: 1.2 m (3 ft 11 in)
- Crew: 1+6
- Caliber: 81 mm (3.2 in)
- Rate of fire: up to 20 rpm sustained
- Effective firing range: HE: 100 - 5,800 m (109 - 6,342 yds)
- Maximum firing range: 6,300 m (6,900 yd)
- Feed system: manual
- Sights: Vammas KRH SNT 94 collimator sight

81 KRH 71 Y (81 mm kranaatinheitin malli 1971 ympäriampuva, '81 mm mortar model 1971, 360-degree traverse') is a light mortar manufactured by Tampella for use by the Finnish Army. It is usually used to support the infantry by indirect fire, but it can also be used for direct fire. Each Finnish infantry company has a platoon of 81 mm mortars. The mortar platoon consists of three seven-man mortar squads, each squad manning a single 81 mm mortar. Jaeger Company M2005 has a fire support squad, which consists of two five-man mortar teams, both equipped with an 81 mm mortar. It can fire HE-fragmentation, smoke, illumination and practice rounds.

Tampella also manufactured a static installed 81 KRH 71 RT (81 mm kranaatinheitin malli 1971 rannikkotykistö, '81 mm mortar model 1971, coastal artillery') for use in the Finnish coastal artillery fortresses.

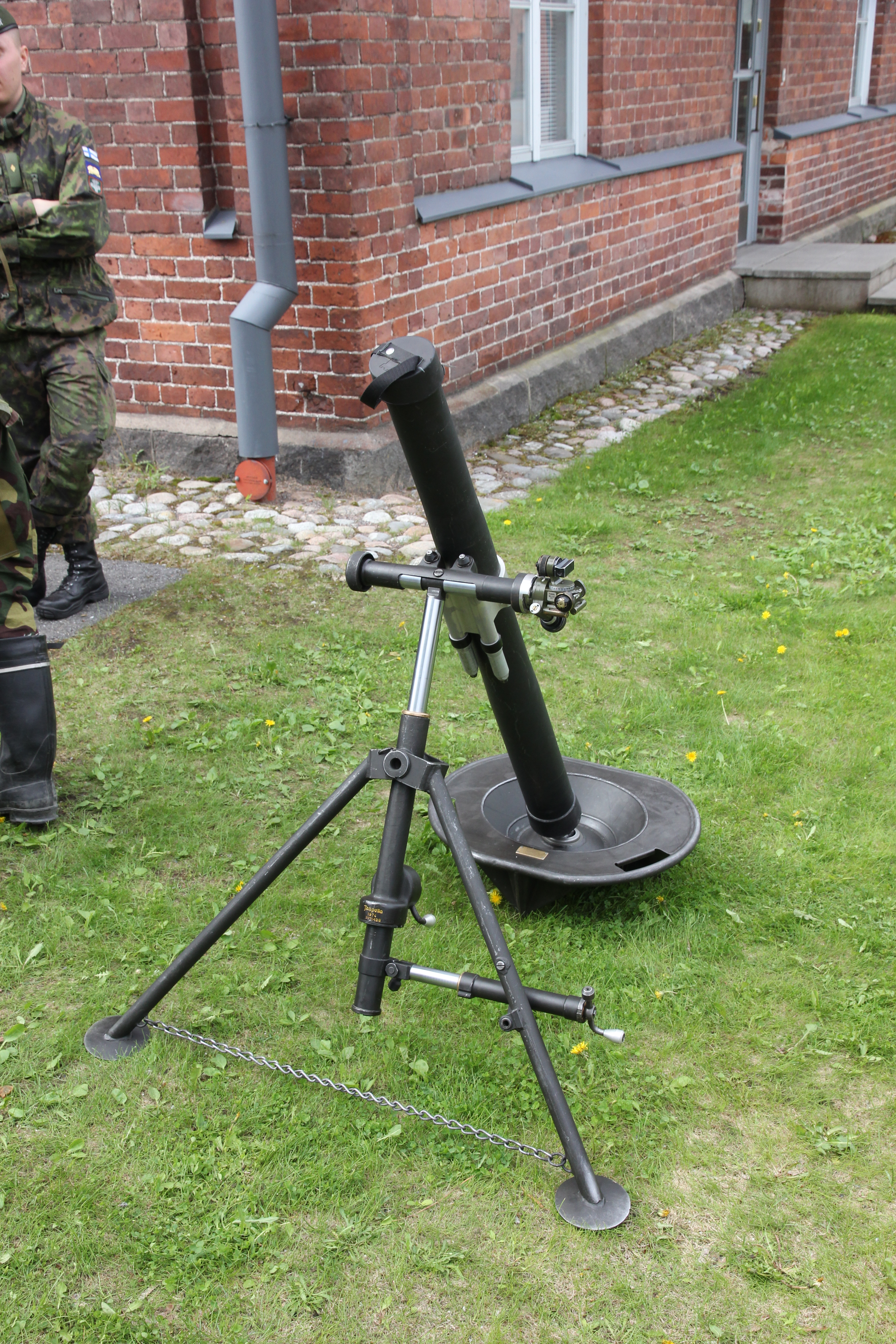
81 KRH 71 96 Y, a model 71 tube with the model 96 baseplate.

A newer version of the 81 KRH 71 Y with an improved baseplate made by Vammas is called the 81 KRH 96 (81 mm kranaatinheitin malli 1996, '81 mm mortar model 1996'). The baseplate is designed by scaling down the baseplate of the 120 KRH 92.

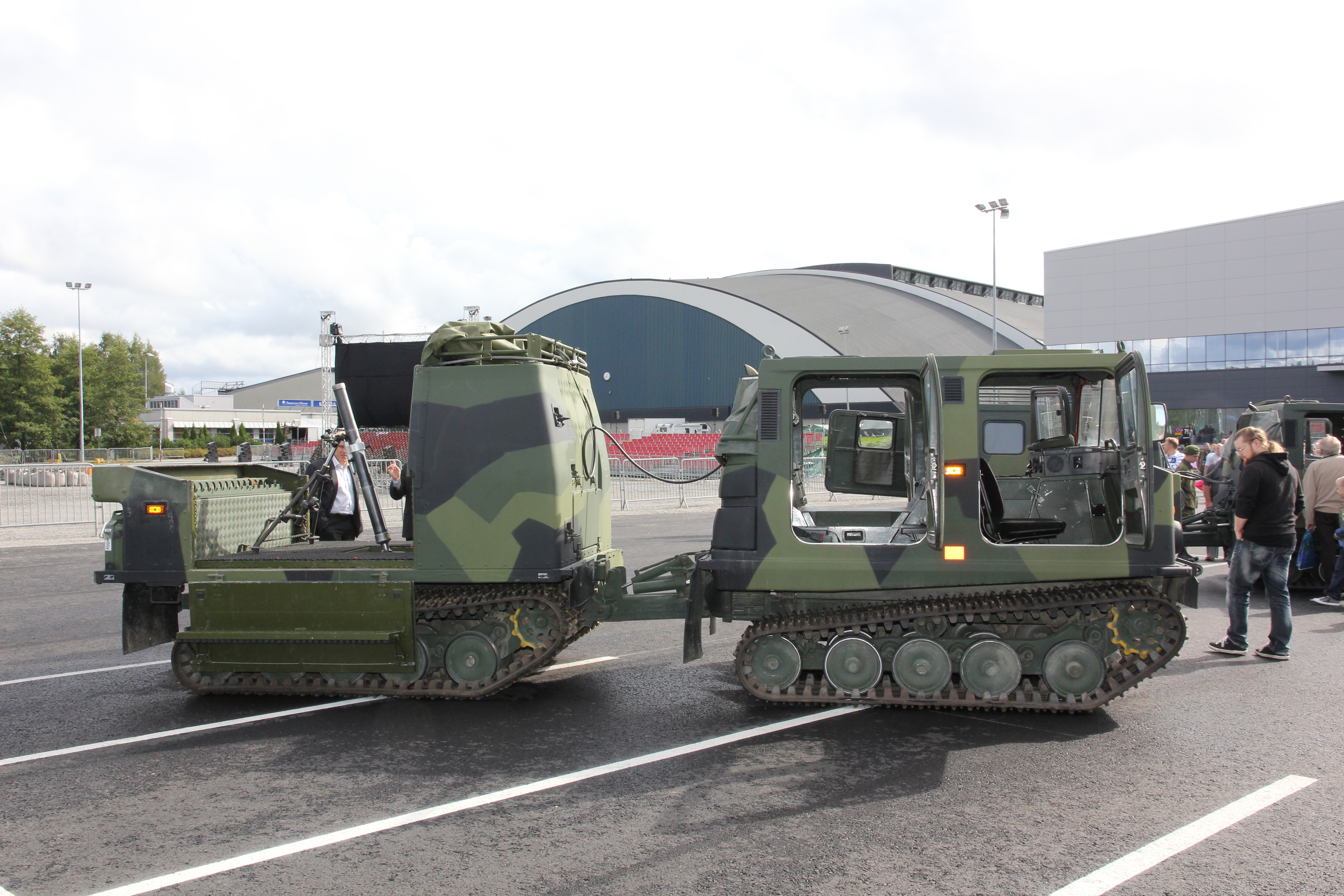
81 KRH 71 Y installed on a Finnish military Bv 206 mortar carrier.
