= TM 65 mine =

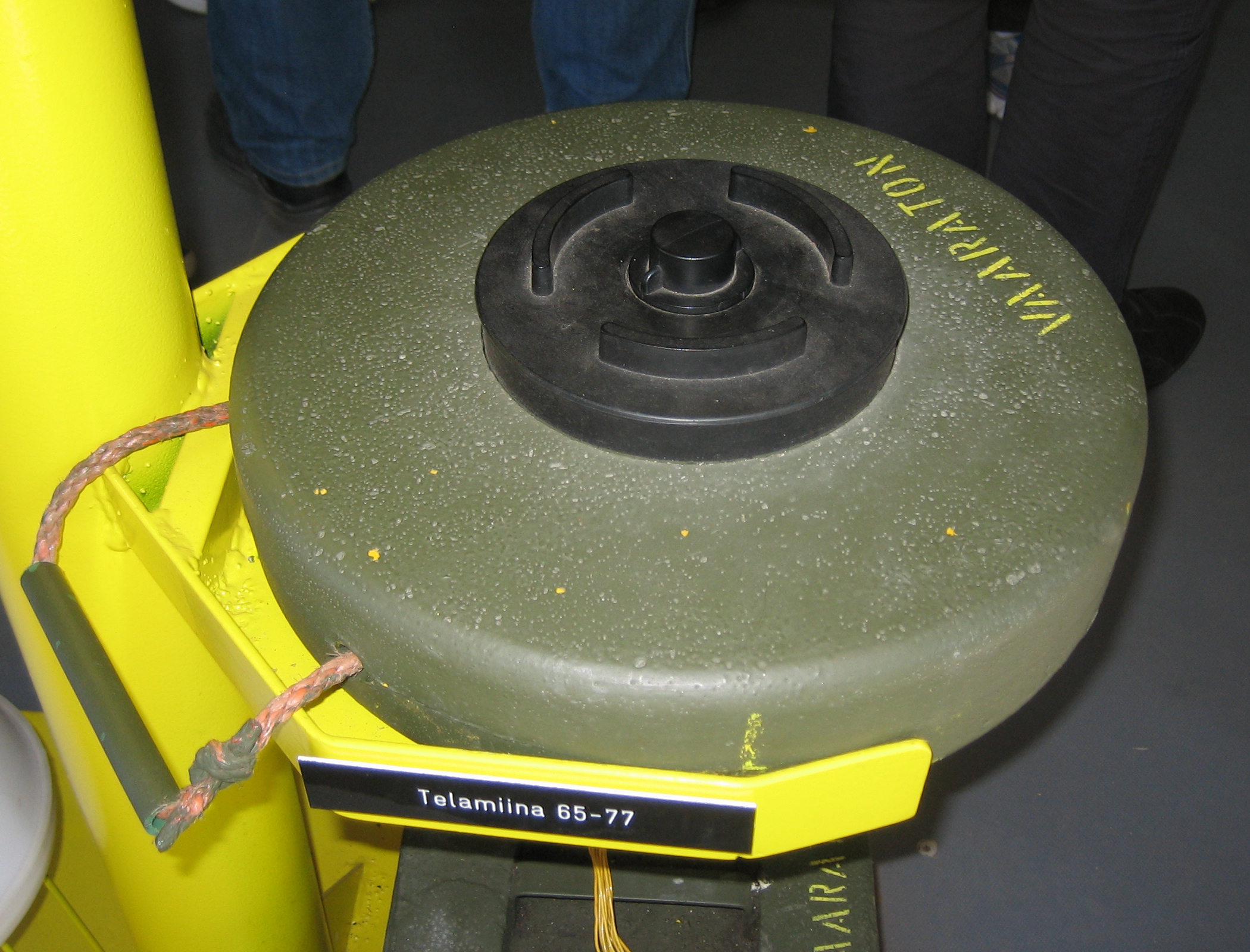
An inert TM 65 77 on display.

The TM 65 (Telamiina 65) is a circular Finnish minimum metal anti-tank blast mine. It is broadly based on the Soviet TM-62 mine. The mines body is made from a thin shell of fibreglass over a cast block of explosive, with a central fuze well that holds the pressure fuze. The original TM 65 used a US-65 fuze as used in the SM-65 anti-personnel mine, the later TM 65 77 uses a pressure fuze similar to the Russian MV-5 fuze called Painesytytin 77.

The fuze is covered with a plastic pressure plate, giving it an activation pressure of 150 to 300 kg. However, if this is not installed, the mine will activate with a pressure of a few kg. The mine also has a secondary fuze well on the side for the installation of anti-handling devices or daisy chaining several mines.

== Specifications ==
- Diameter: 320 mm
- Height: 110 mm
- Weight: 10 kg
- Explosive content: 9.5 kg of cast TNT, plus a total of 61 g of Hexogen (A RDX/TNT mix) in the fuze and booster.
- Operating pressure: 150 to 300 kg

== Variants ==
- TM 65 - original version fitted with US-65 fuze
- TM 65 77 - variant fitted with MV-5 style fuze, the PS 77
