= Patria TREMOS =

Finnish vehicle-mounted mortar system

Patria TREMOS is a mortar system developed by the Finnish company Patria, in which an 81 or 120 mm mortar is mounted on a vehicle.

== Development ==
Patria developed the new type of vehicle-mounted mortar launcher in collaboration with the Finnish Army and the Finnish Defence Forces Logistics Department. The idea was to improve the mobility of traditional mortar launchers on the modern battlefield, where changing firing positions is important.

It took only a year from the decision to implement the initial ideas to the testing of the first prototype. Patria used experience from its Patria AMOS and Patria NEMO systems, among others, in the development. TREMOS was launched at the Future Mortar Systems conference in London on 29 October 2024.

== Design ==
TREMOS includes an integration module that can be quickly and easily installed on various platforms, such as off-road trucks and tracked vehicles. The module can also be transferred from one vehicle to another, for example in the event of a failure of the original vehicle. The module is modular, meaning it can be modified to meet different needs.

The TREMOS module can be fitted with a conventional 81 or 120 mm smoothbore launcher, and the system supports all of their ammunition. The launcher is attached to a recoil dampener, which reduces the recoil of the shot onto the ground. Thanks to the dampening, the vehicle does not need ground supports, which speeds up operations. Ammunition can be carried with it.

TREMOS is capable of opening fire within 60 seconds of entering a firing position and exiting immediately after the last shot. The rapid movement helps protect the vehicle and its crew from incoming fire as the firing position can be accurately located and quickly returned. The vehicle can operate alone or as part of a larger fire unit.

== Operators ==
=== Future operators ===
Finland (>100 on order)
Finland will procure over 100 TREMOS mortar systems, designated 120 KRH M3, from Patria.
