= Berberys-R =

Polish multispectral camouflage system

- Type: Military camouflage pattern
- Place of origin: Poland

Service history
- Wars: Operation Enduring Freedom

Berberys-R is a Polish multispectral camouflage system manufactured by company Miranda sp. z o.o. (Poland).

== Design ==
Berberys-R reduces visibility in the visible and infrared spectra, to thermal vision, and to radiolocation signatures.

== Adoption ==
The Berberys-R is offered for individual soldiers, PT-91 and Leopard 2 MBT's, and also for the KTO Rosomak vehicle among others. It was used by Polish Army units participating in Operation Enduring Freedom in Afghanistan.
