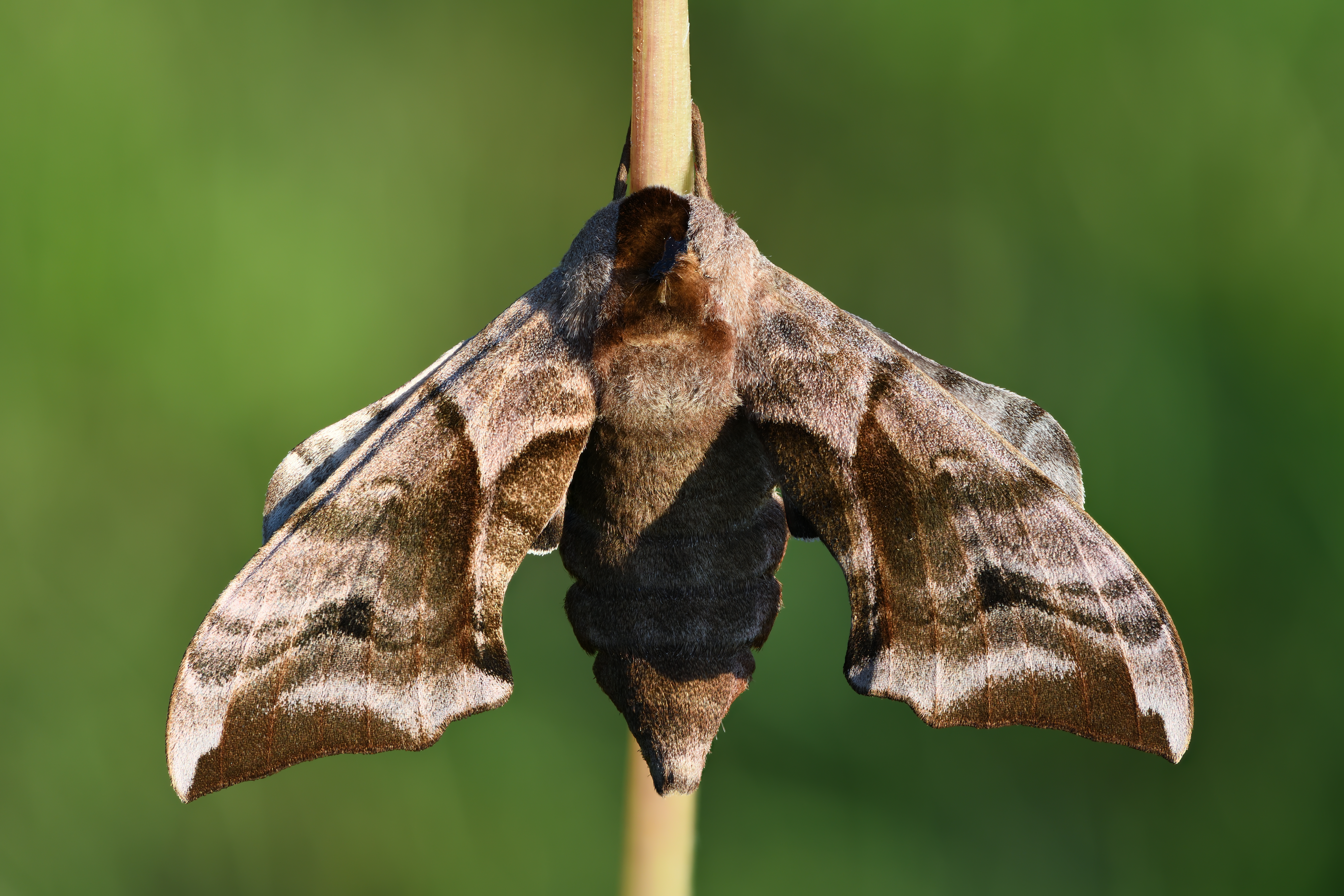
- Female in resting position
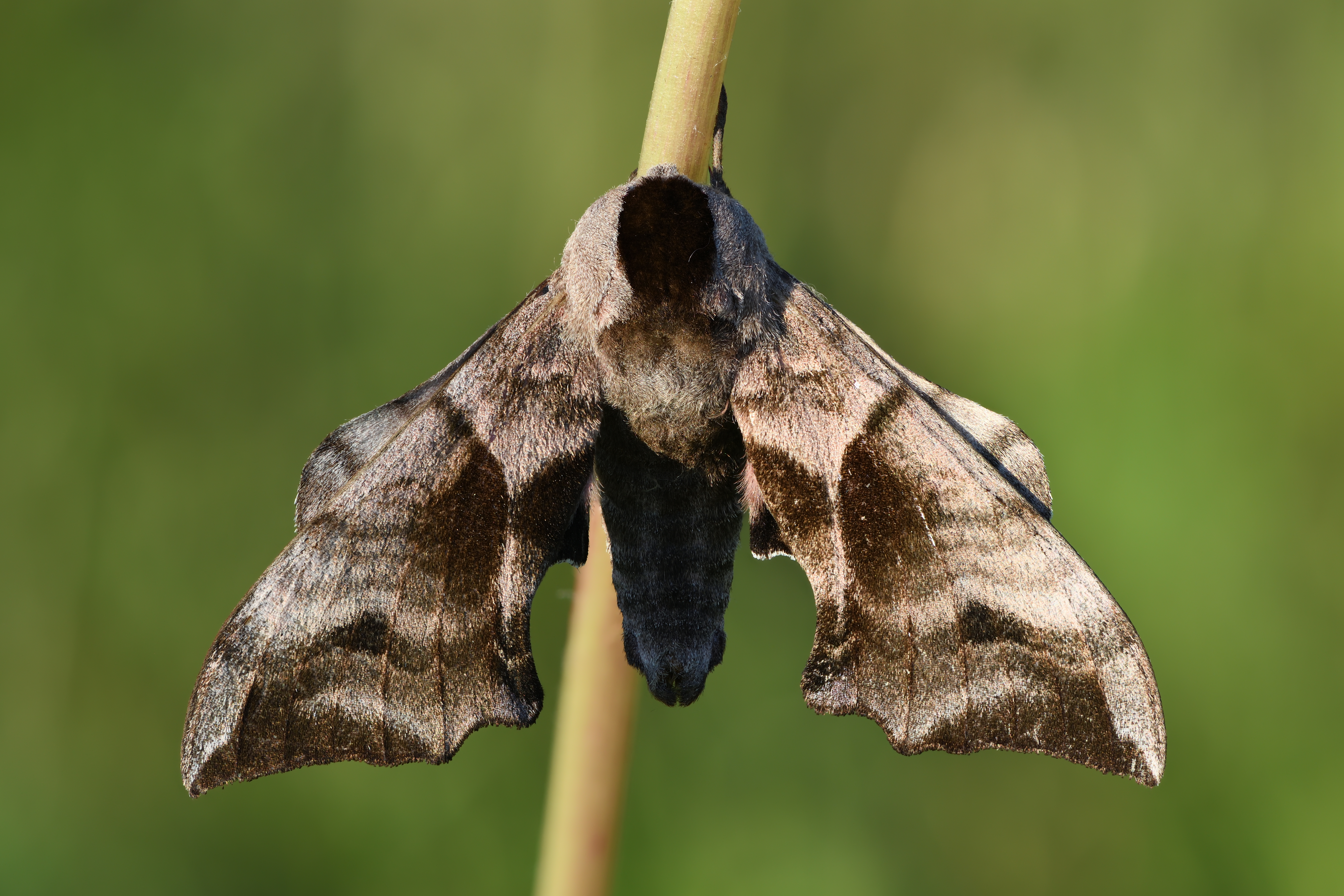
- Male in resting position

Scientific classification
- Kingdom: Animalia
- Phylum: Arthropoda
- Clade: Pancrustacea
- Class: Insecta
- Order: Lepidoptera
- Family: Sphingidae
- Genus: Smerinthus
- Species: S. ocellatus

Binomial name
- Smerinthus ocellatus (Linnaeus, 1758)

Synonyms
- Sphinx ocellata Linnaeus, 1758; Sphinx salicis Hübner, 1796; Sphinx semipavo Retzius, 1783; Smerinthus ocellata (misspelling); Smerinthus atlanticus Austaut, 1890; Smerinthus atlanticus aestivalis (Austaut, 1890); Smerinthus ocellata albescens Tutt, 1902; Smerinthus ocellata biocellata (Lempke, 1959); Smerinthus ocellata brunnescens (Lempke, 1959); Smerinthus ocellata caeca Tutt, 1902; Smerinthus ocellata caerulocellata (Lempke, 1959); Smerinthus ocellata cinerascens Staudinger, 1879; Smerinthus ocellata deroseata (Lempke, 1959); Smerinthus ocellata diluta (Closs, 1917); Smerinthus ocellata flavescens Neumann, 1930; Smerinthus ocellata grisea (Closs, 1917); Smerinthus ocellata kainiti Knop, 1937; Smerinthus ocellata monochromica Cockayne, 1953; Smerinthus ocellata ollivryi Oberthür, 1920; Smerinthus ocellata pallida Tutt, 1902; Smerinthus ocellata parvocellata (Lempke, 1959); Smerinthus ocellata reducta Schnaider, 1950; Smerinthus ocellata rosea Bartel, 1900; Smerinthus ocellata rufescens (Lempke, 1959); Smerinthus ocellata uniformis (Lempke, 1959); Smerinthus ocellata viridiocellata (Lempke, 1959)

= Smerinthus ocellatus =

Eyed hawk-moth

Species of moth in the family Sphingidae

Smerinthus ocellatus, the eyed hawk-moth, is a European moth of the family Sphingidae. The species was first described by Carl Linnaeus in his 1758 10th edition of Systema Naturae.

The eyespots are not visible in resting position, where the forewings cover them. They are displayed when the moth feels threatened, and may startle a potential predator, giving the moth a chance to escape.

== Imago ==
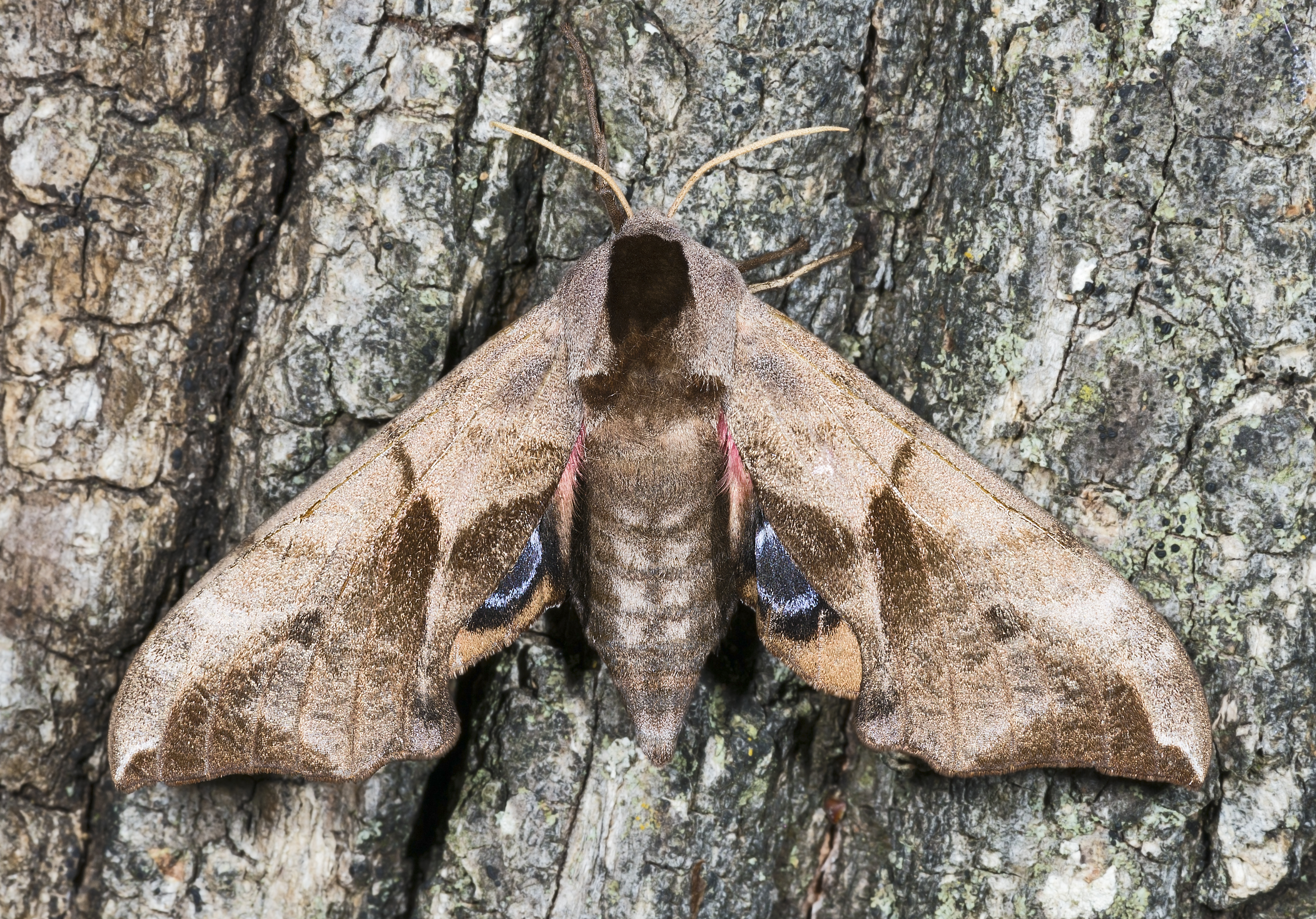
The eyespots are displayed when the moth feels threatened

The adult (imago) is very similar in appearance to the other two western Palaearctic Smerinthus species, Smerinthus caecus and Smerinthus kindermannii but differentiated by an apical thorn on the foretibia, and the large, circular hindwing ocellus. The upperside forewings are marked in light and dark shades of brown and resemble the colouring of bark. The hindwings are pink coloured basally and then a yellow ochre. The hindwings are dominated by a large, blue, dark-centred and black-rimmed eyespot. The thorax has light brown sides and dark brown hairs in the middle. In addition to variations in the density of the forewing pattern intensity, differences in colour are also found on the hindwing. In f. flavescens Neumann hindwing pink is replaced by yellow in f. pallida Tutt by grey and in f. albescens Tutt. In f. rosea Bartel, the pink is deep and the forewings are yellowish brown; in f. ollivryi Oberthür, the ocellus is replaced by a buff brown patch. The adult moth has a wingspan of 70–80 millimetres (2.8–3.1 in).

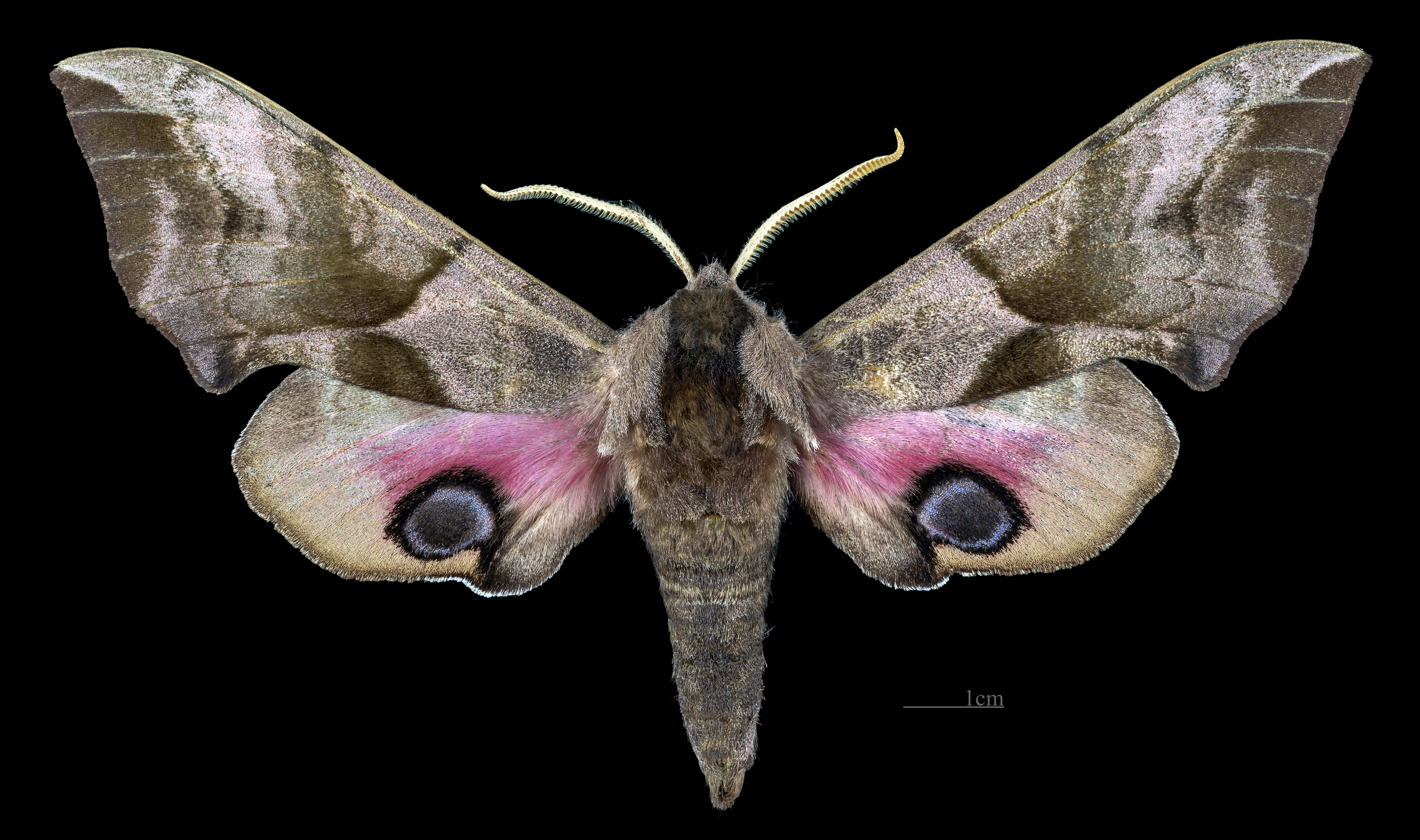
Smerinthus ocellata ♂

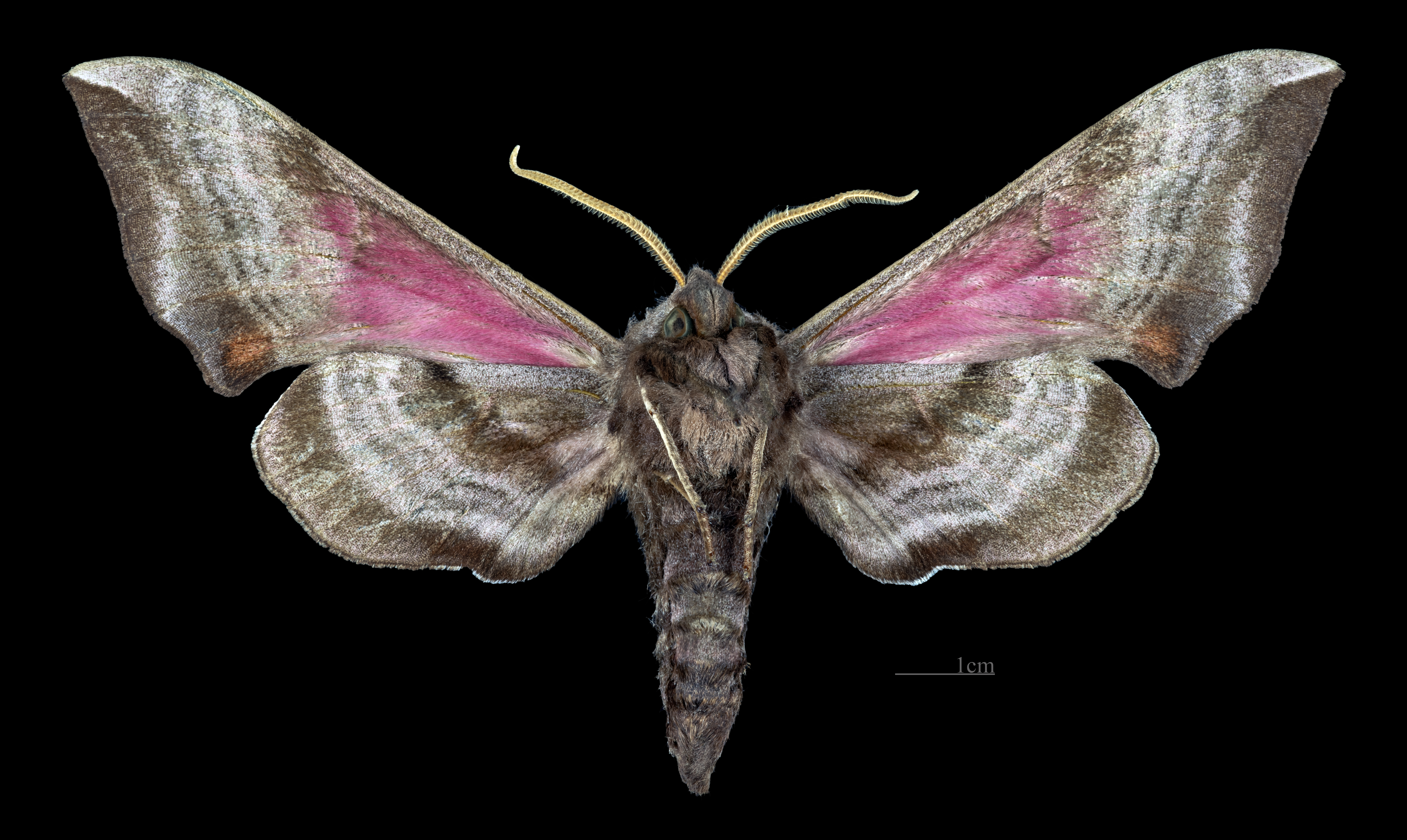
Smerinthus ocellata ♂ △

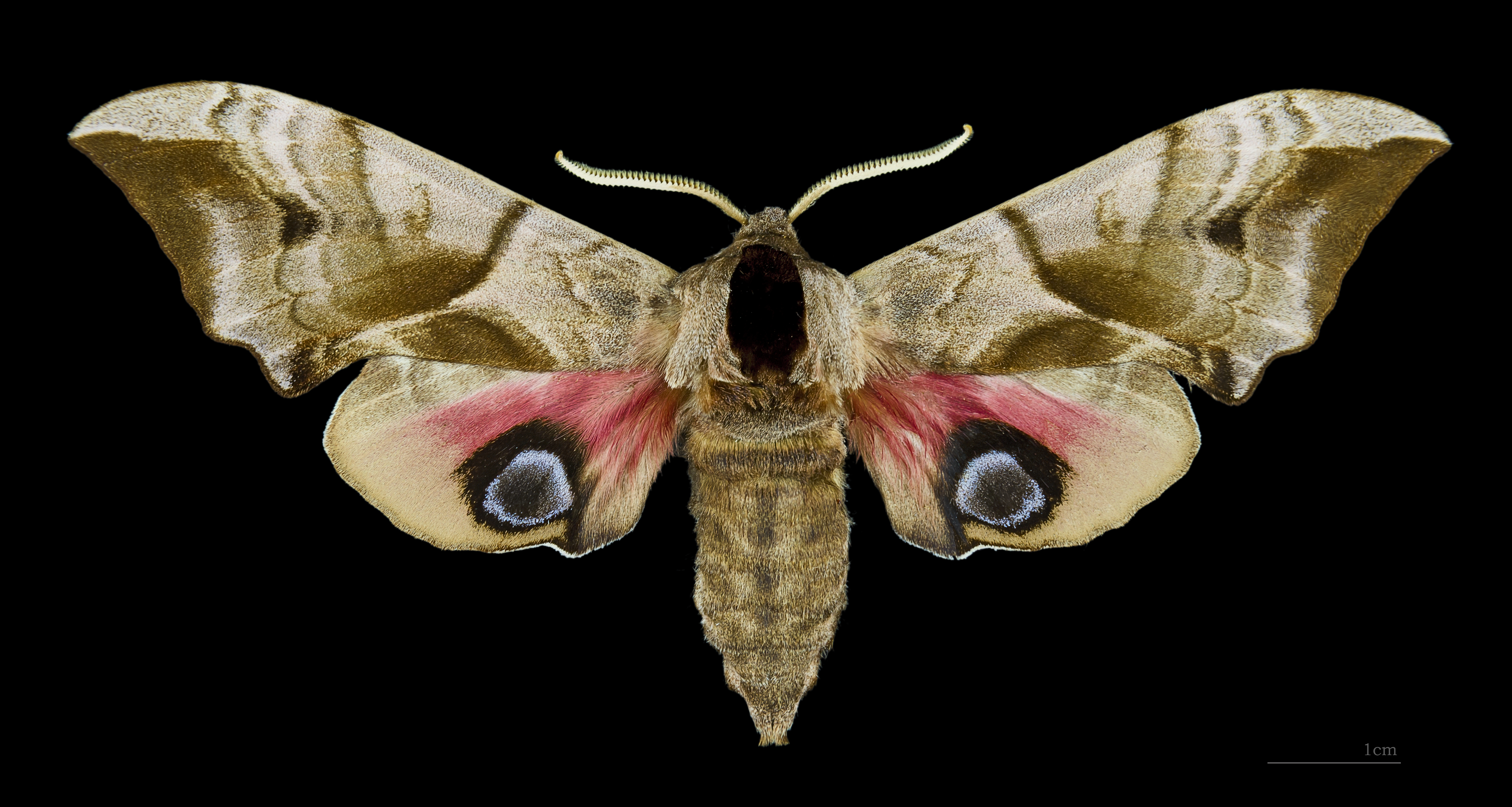
Smerinthus ocellata♀

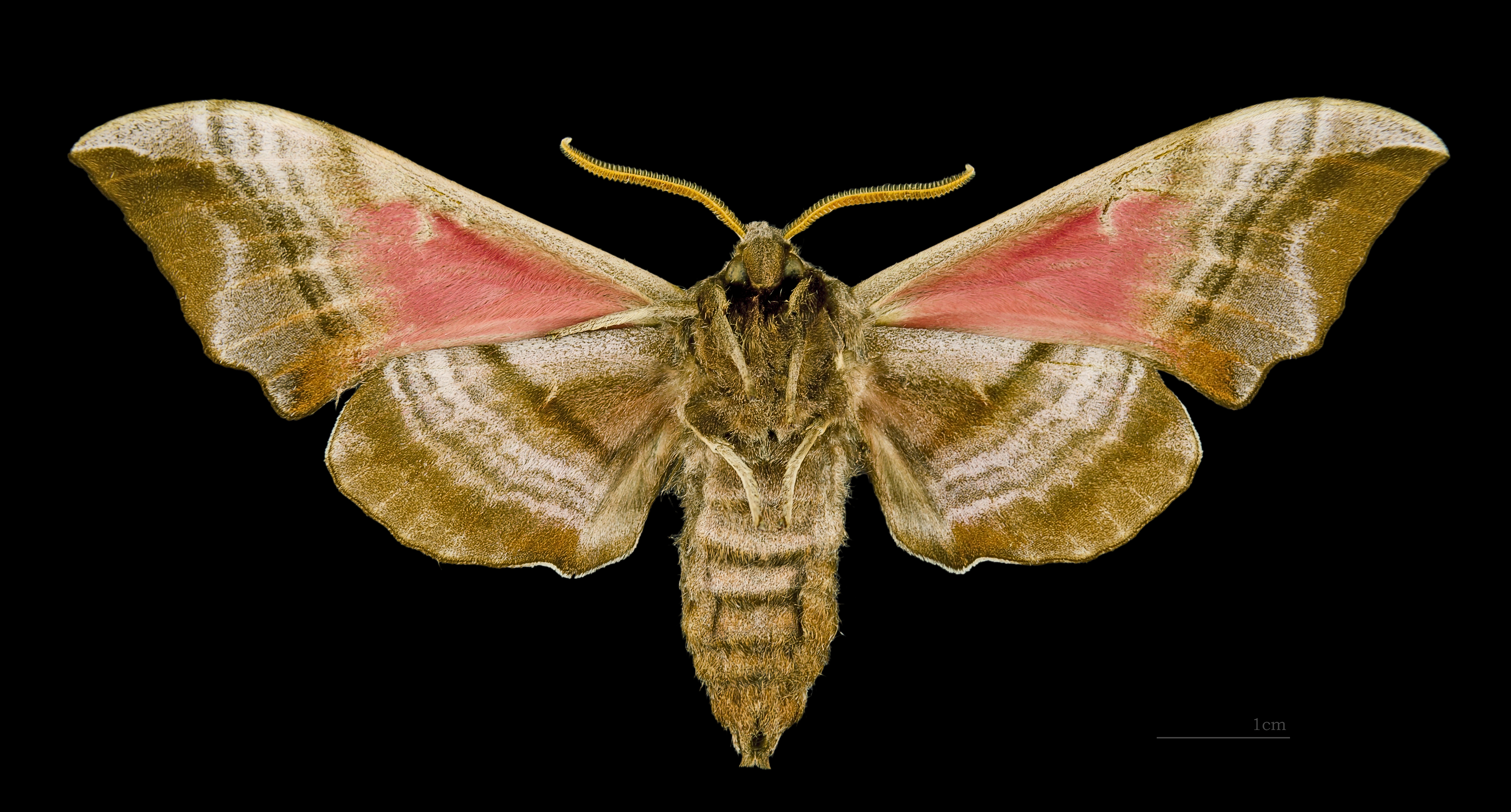
Smerinthus ocellata ♀ △

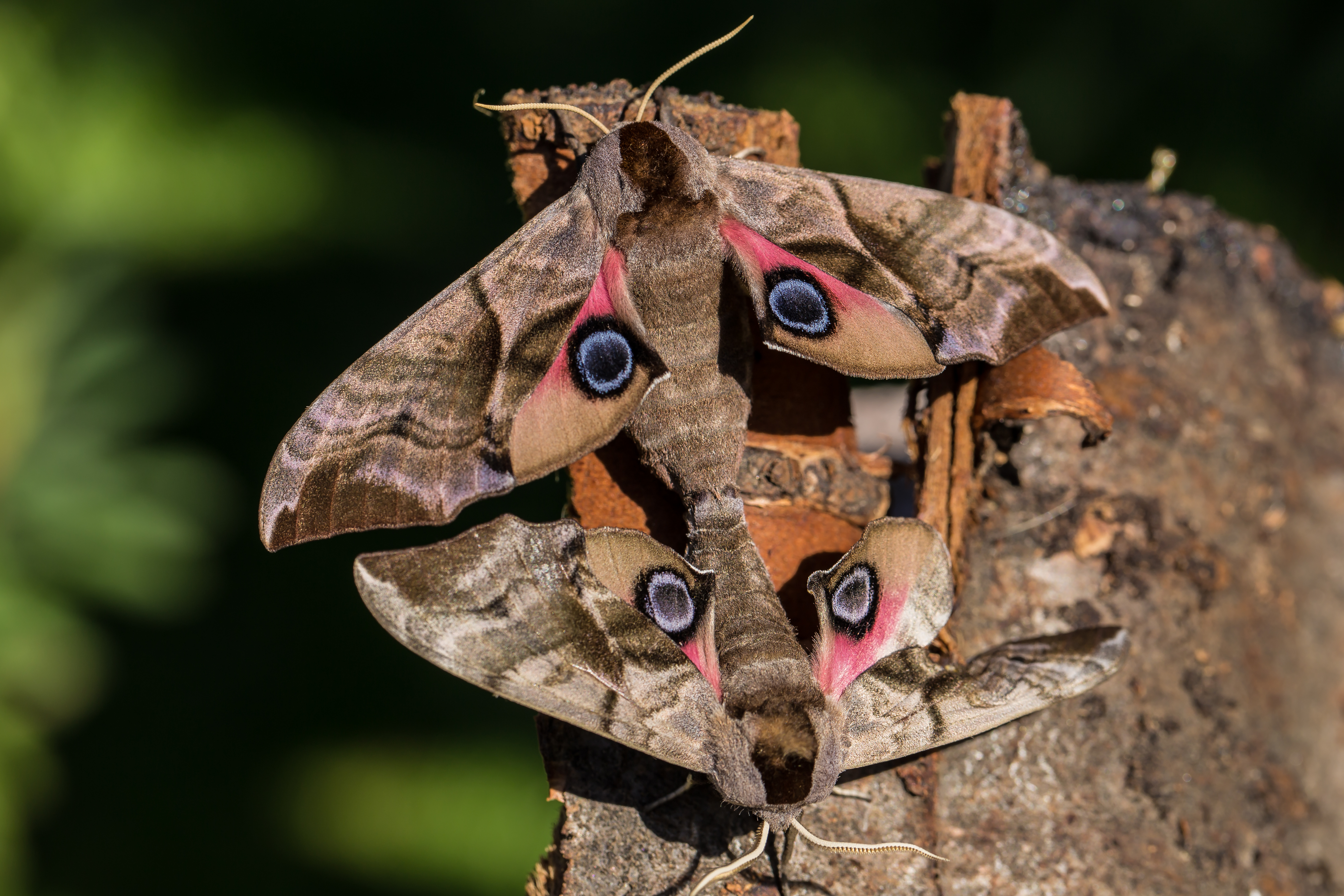
♂ and ♀ mating

=== Historical description ===
Edward Newman described it thus:

The Eyed Hawk-Moth, so called from a large and beautiful spot in each of the hind wings that somewhat resembles an eye. The fore wings are brown, with a very beautiful reddish bloom over them, and clouded with olive-brown. The hind wings are of a delicate rosy red at the base, and a pale brown towards the margin; and each has a large and beautiful eye-like spot, grey in the centre, surrounded with blue, and the blue surrounded by a black ring. The skin of the caterpillar is rough, like shagreen; it is pale green, sprinkled with white, and has seven oblique white stripes on each side. The horn at the tail is blue. It is very common in the autumn, feeding on apple trees in gardens, and on willow bushes in hedges. The chrysalis is red-brown, and glossy. The Moth is found about Midsummer.

== Larva ==
The larva (caterpillar) is pale bluish or yellowish green with small white-tipped tubercules and a grey-blue tail horn. The sides are striped white or yellow and the spiracles are white ringed with dark red. The larvae grow to about 80 mm. The larval food plants are various species of Salix, Populus and Malus.

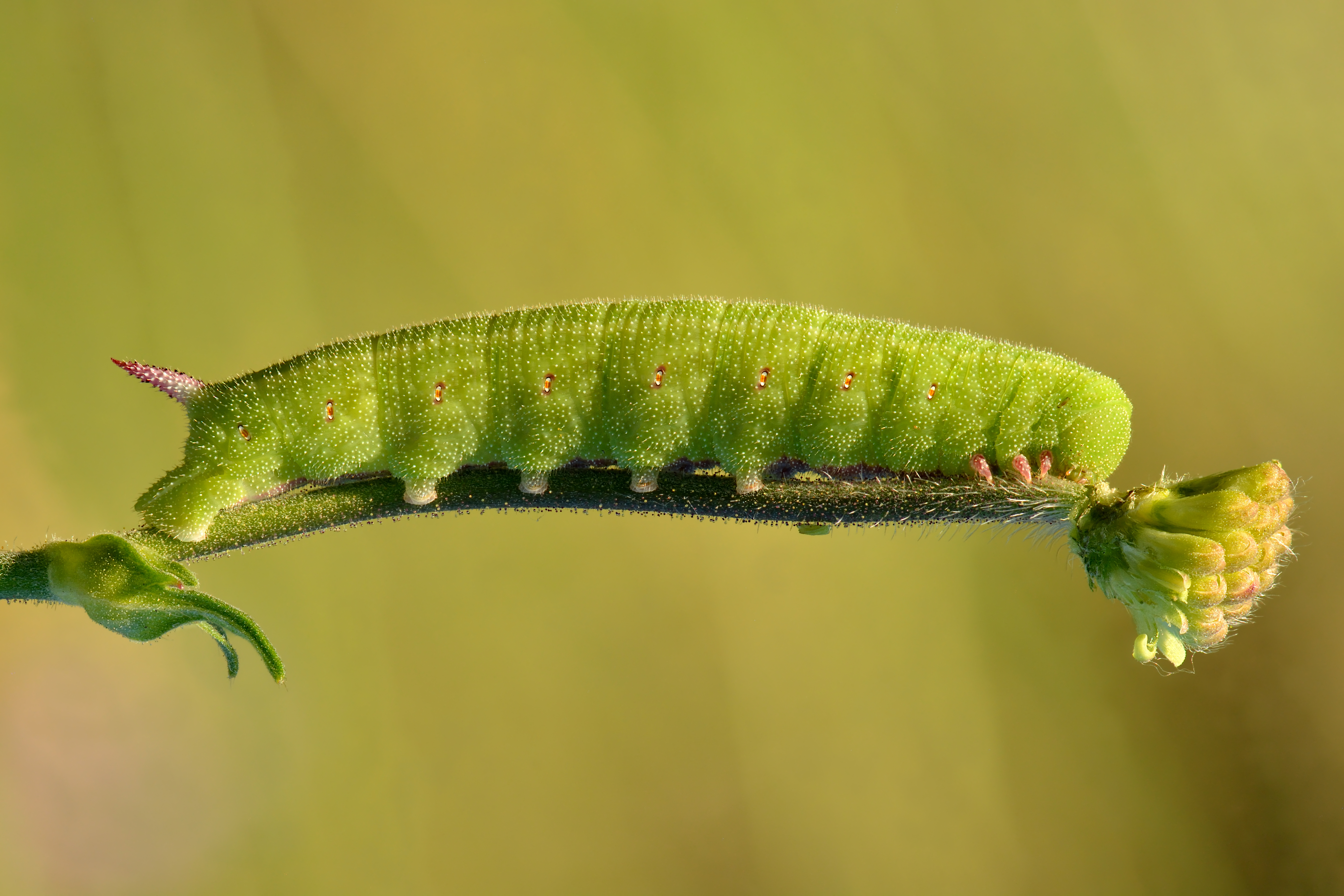
Caterpillar

== Pupa ==
The pupa is glossy reddish brown, and is formed below the soil surface in late summer, where it overwinters. The adults emerge the following summer in May or June.

== Subspecies ==
- Smerinthus ocellatus ocellatus
- Smerinthus ocellatus atlanticus Austaut, 1890 (confined to the Atlas Mountains and their surrounding lowlands, from Morocco to Tunisia)
- Smerinthus atlanticus protai Speidel & Kaltenbach, 1981 (Sardinia and Corsica)

Smerinthus ocellatus atlanticus is sometimes treated as a full species, in which case Smerinthus atlanticus protai is placed as a subspecies of this species, rather than Smerinthus ocellatus.

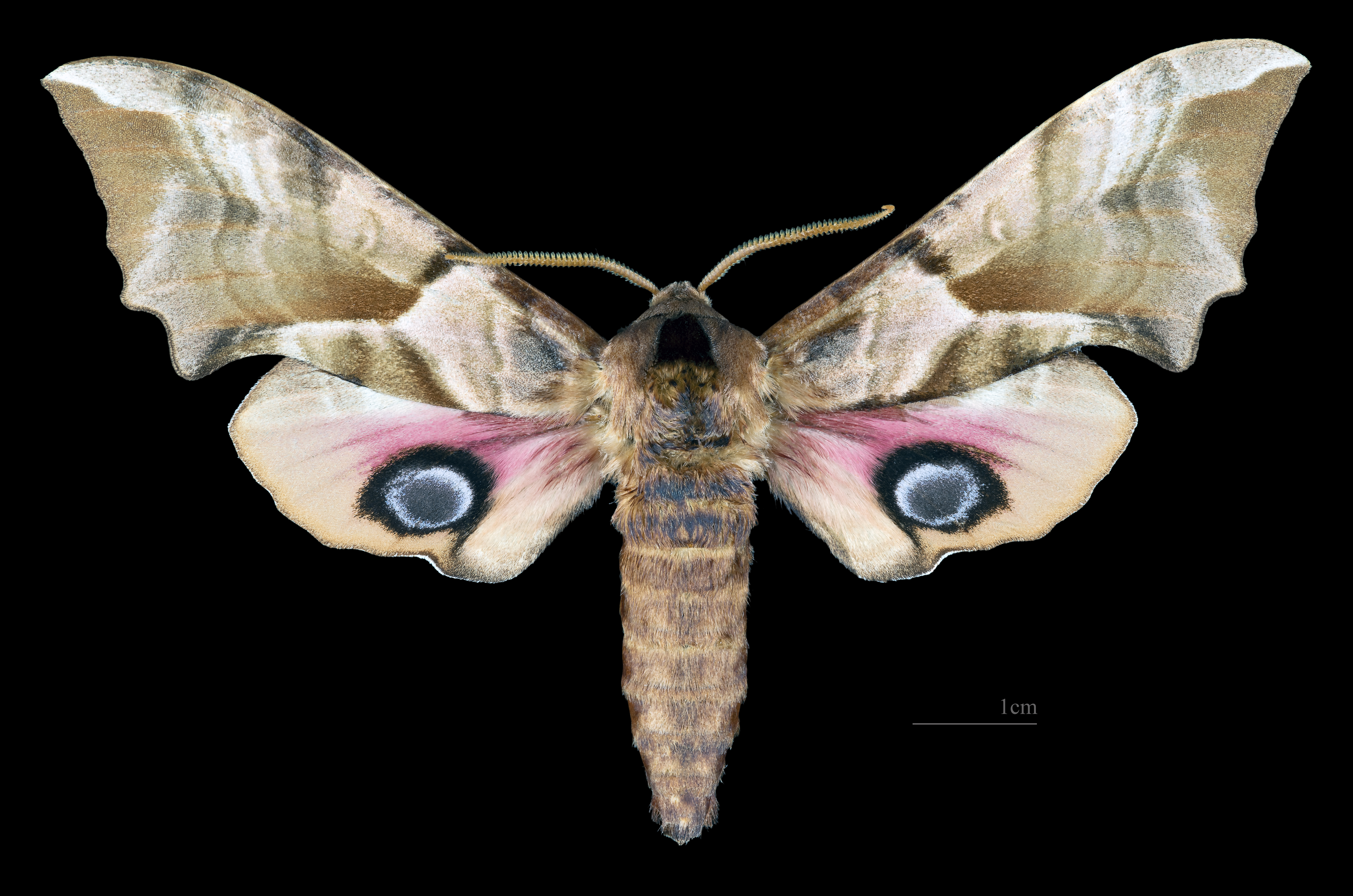
Smerinthus ocellata atlanticus ♂

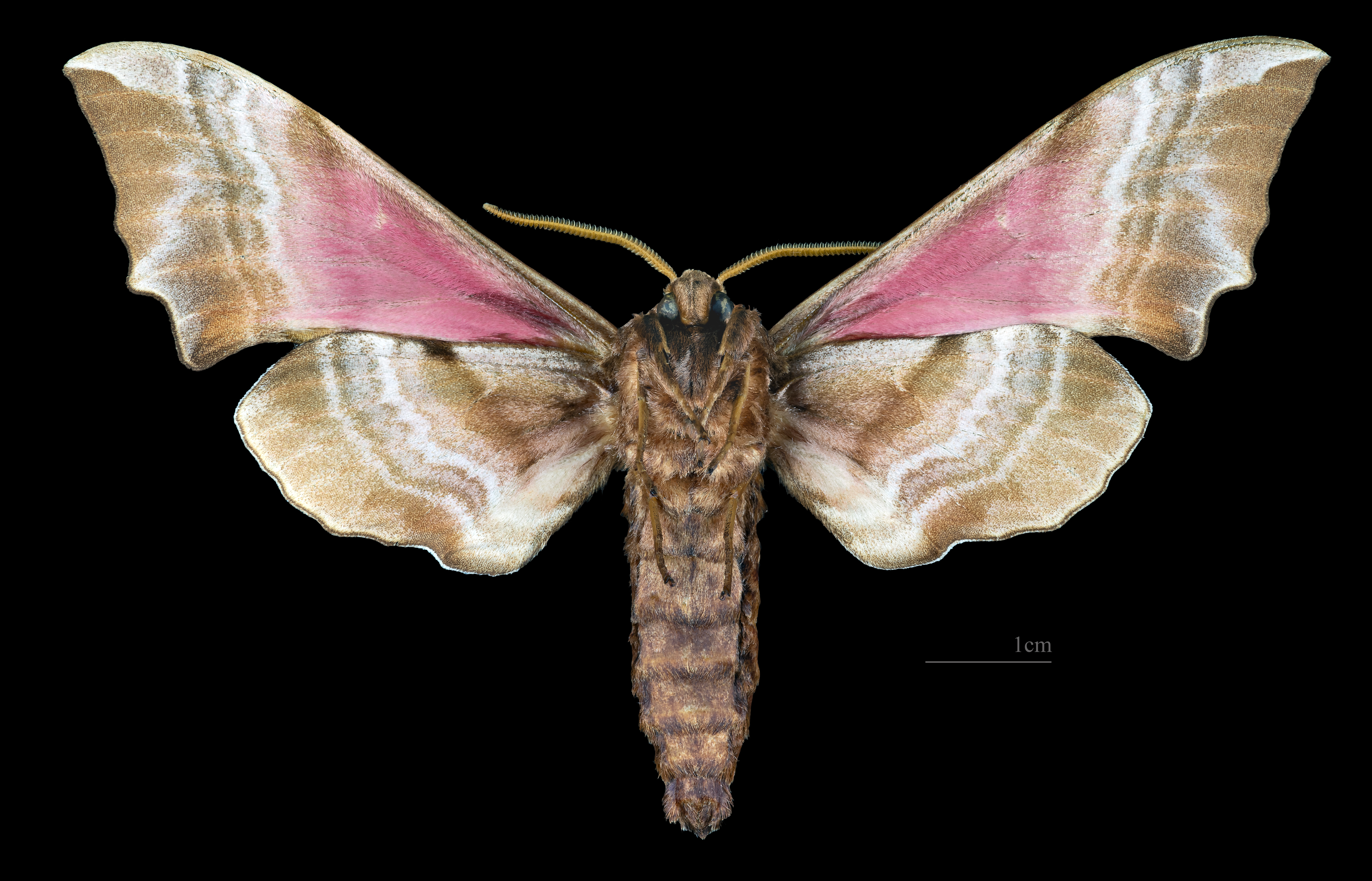
Smerinthus ocellata atlanticus ♂ △

== Nomenclatural note ==
The name Smerinthus is apparently derived from the Greek feminine noun 'Merinthos', but has been Latinised with the masculine -us ending and is thus, according to the ICZN article 30.1.3, masculine. As the ICZN rules that species names that are adjectives should agree in gender with the genus name, the common use of Smerinthus ocellata for this species is incorrect.

== See also ==
- Smerinthus cerisyi
- Smerinthus jamaicensis
