= M76 =

M76 or M-76 may refer to:

- M-76 (Michigan highway), a former state highway in Michigan
- Smith & Wesson M76, an American variant of the Swiss Carl Gustav M/45 submachine gun
- Valmet M76, a Finnish gas operated assault rifle
- Zastava M76, a semi-automatic Yugoslav sniper rifle
- Messier 76, a planetary nebula in the constellation Perseus
- M76 Otter, an amphibious cargo carrier
- Tikka M55 or originally Tikka M76, a Finnish rifle
- Marszałkowska 76 Office Center (also known as M76), an office building in Warsaw
