= Tikka M65 =

Finnish rifle

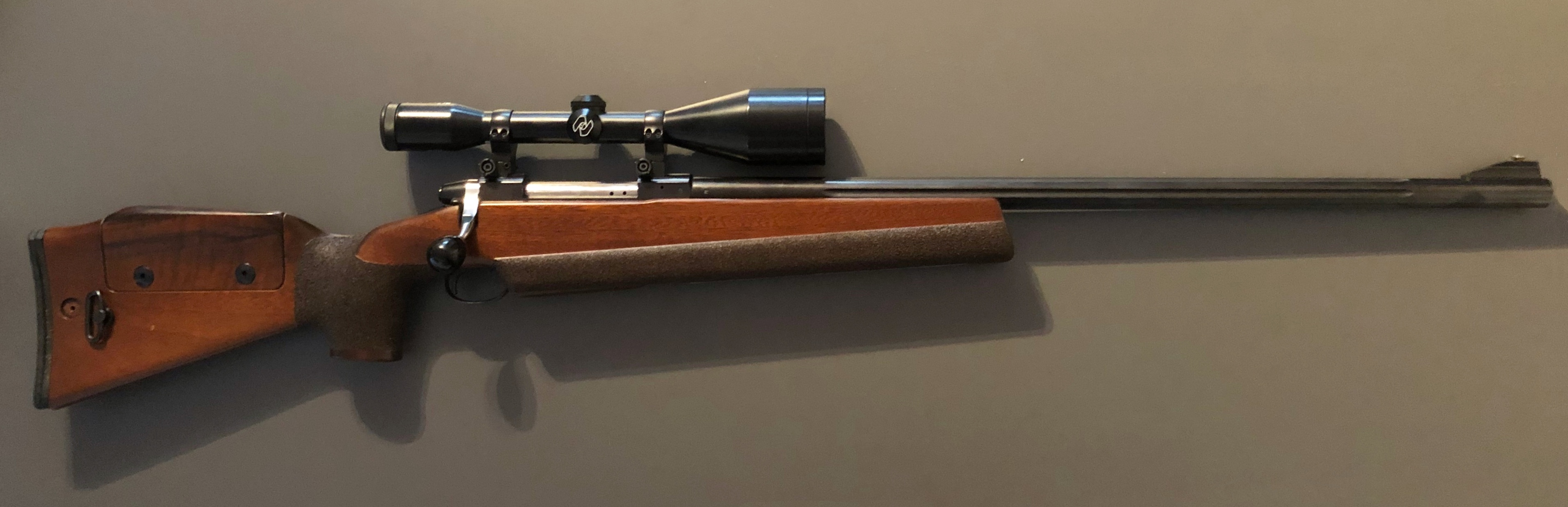
- Tikka M65 Super Sporter
- Type: Rifle; Sniper rifle
- Place of origin: Finland

Production history
- Designer: Tikkakoski
- Designed: 1969
- Manufacturer: Tikkakoski
- Produced: 1969–1989
- Variants: Tikka LSA65 Standard; Tikka LSA65 Deluxe; Tikka LSA65 Sporter; Tikka M65 Standard; Tikka M65 Deluxe; Tikka M65 Trapper; Tikka M65 Fullstock; Tikka M65 Hirvester; Tikka M65 Battue; Tikka M65 Continental; Tikka M65 Sporter; Tikka M65 Super Sporter; Tikka M65 Master; Tikka M65A

Specifications
- Mass: 3.1 kg (Trapper); 3.4 kg (Fullstock and Battue); 3.5 kg (Standard and Deluxe); 4.2 kg (Continental); 4.5 kg (Sporter); 4.5 kg (Super Sporter); 4.7 kg (Master); 4.5 kg (M65A)
- Length: 1040 mm (Trapper, Fullstock and Battue); 1090 mm (Standard and Deluxe); 1140 mm (Sporter, Super Sporter and Continental); 1180 mm (Master); 1140 mm (M65A)
- Barrel length: 520 mm (Trapper, Fullstock and Battue); 560 mm (Standard and Deluxe); 620 mm (Sporter, Super Sporter and Continental); 660 mm (Master)
- Cartridge: .25-06 Remington; 6.5×55mm Swedish.270 Winchester; 7×57mm Mauser; 7×64mm 7mm Remington Magnum.308 Winchester.30-06 Springfield.300 Winchester Magnum.338 Winchester Magnum; 9.3×62mm
- Action: Bolt action, 90° rotating bolt, two locking lugs, two safety lugs
- Feed system: 4, 5, 7, 8 or 10-round detachable double stack box magazine 5 or 10-round detachable single stack box magazine (M65A)
- Sights: Day or night optics; open or aperture iron sights

The Tikka M65 (originally Tikka LSA65) is a Finnish rifle designed by a Finnish firearms company Tikkakoski in 1969. It was designed as a long action rifle on the basis of the short action Tikka M55 rifle, however its action differs much from the M55. Like the Tikka M55, the M65 was imported to the United States by Ithaca Gun Company.

== History ==
Tikkakoski company had designed the Tikka M55 in 1967–1968 and it had been brought to production in 1968 (initially called Tikka M76 but already in 1969 LSA55). However, it could only use cartridges with cases up to 55 mm, and Tikkakoski decided to develop a long action rifle in 1969, the M65, which initially was called LSA65, for cases up to 65 mm long (after which the rifle was named). In 1972 the rifle was renamed to M65.

Tikkakoski company was bought by Nokia in 1974 and by Sako in 1983. Sako also bought Valmet in 1986. After the success of the Tikka M55 as a sniper rifle, in 1988 Sako brought a purpose-built sniper rifle Tikka M65A to the market, with significant modifications to the basic design. The M65A took some design features from the Valmet Sniper M86, such as the aluminium bedding block.

In 1987 the Tikkakoski factory was run down, all its machinery was destroyed, and production of Tikka rifles was transferred to Sako factory at Riihimäki. The last Tikka M55 and M65 were assembled in 1989. In 1990 the Tikka M65 was superseded by the Tikka M658 rifle of the Tikka M88 series.

The design work from the Tikka M65A and Valmet Sniper M86 were used to develop the Sako TRG sniper rifle in the early 1990s.

== Design ==
The Tikka M65 action is based on the Tikka M55, which in turn is loosely based on the Mauser action, which Tikkakoski had wanted to modernise. The repeating magazine fed rifle features a milled receiver made from special steel, to which a 90° rotating, two-lug cylindrical bolt locks; the M65 also incorporates two additional safety lugs at the rear of the bolt, as well as two vent holes in the bolt body to vent off gases to the side if a primer breaks. Unlike the M55, the M65 also features an integral recoil lug, which is made to the receiver in the milling process. The receiver has 17 mm dovetail rails milled on its top side for attaching optical sights as in the M55. The later model bolts have a large handle with a plastic ball-shaped end. The M65A also has a polyacrylamide bushing as a bolt guide.

The barrel is cut rifled with 6 grooves and depending on the model, either 520 mm (20.47 in), 560 mm (22.83 in), 620 mm (24.41 in) or 660 mm (25.98 in) long. Just as in the M55, some models feature iron sights attached to the barrel; rear sight is an open notch and front sight is a hooded post. The barrel is free-floating, also in the Fullstock variant.

The trigger mechanism has an adjustable trigger pull between 0.8–1 kg and 3 kg. The trigger pull can be adjusted by rotating a screw inside the magazine well. The trigger has a tendency to produce unintentional discharges if the trigger pull is set too light.

In the standard versions, the magazine is either a 4, 5, 7, 8 or 10-round double stack stamped steel magazine, and the magazine catch is located in front of the trigger, within the trigger guard. In M65A, the magazine is either a 5 or 10-round single stack single feed stamped steel magazine, and the magazine catches are attached to both sides of the magazine itself, as in the Valmet Sniper M86.

The sporter variants feature heavy walnut stocks which are convex towards the cheek and concave on the away side, and have UIT rails on their underside and left side, for attaching different accessories. The M65A has an aluminium bedded stock with an aluminium chassis inside the walnut stock like the Valmet Sniper M86. The butt of the M65A rifle is attached to the chassis with an aluminium tube, and it has a fully adjustable walnut cheekpiece; the front end of the stock is made with two walnut stocksides, which attach to the aluminium chassis. At the underside of the M65A there is an UIT accessory rail for bipods and such accessories.

== Variants ==
- LSA65 (also LSA 65 and LSA-65) – The initial name of the rifle
  - LSA 65 Standard – Standard hunting variant.
  - LSA 65 Deluxe – Premium variant of the LSA65 Standard.
  - LSA 65 Sporter – Heavy barrel variant designed for sports shooting.
- M65 – LSA65 renamed to M65 in 1972.
  - M65 Standard – Standard hunting variant.
  - M65 Deluxe – Premium variant of the M65 Standard.
  - M65 Leather – Variant of the M65 Standard with the stock clad in leather.
  - M65 Trapper – Light barrel hunting variant.
  - M65 Fullstock – Light barrel hunting variant with a full-length stock.
  - M65 Hirvester – Hunting variant. Its name is a pun on hirvi ('moose' or 'elk') and harvester.
  - M65 Battue – Hunting variant.
  - M65 Continental – Heavy barrel hunting variant.
  - M65 Sporter – Heavy barrel variant designed for sports shooting and for use as a sniper rifle. Improved stock over the LSA65 Sporter.
  - M65 Super Sporter – Improved version of the M65 Sporter.
  - M65 Master
- M65A – Late purpose-built sniper rifle variant.

=== Derivatives ===
- Tikka M88 series – successor to the Tikka M55 and M65.
  - Tikka M658 – long action rifle of the Tikka M88 series.

== See also ==
- Tikkakoski company
- Tikka M55, short action rifle on which the Tikka M65 is based on.
- Tikka T3, modern day successor to the Tikka M55 and M65 legacy.
- Valmet Sniper M86
- Sako TRG
