= KP m/44 submachine gun =

KP m/44
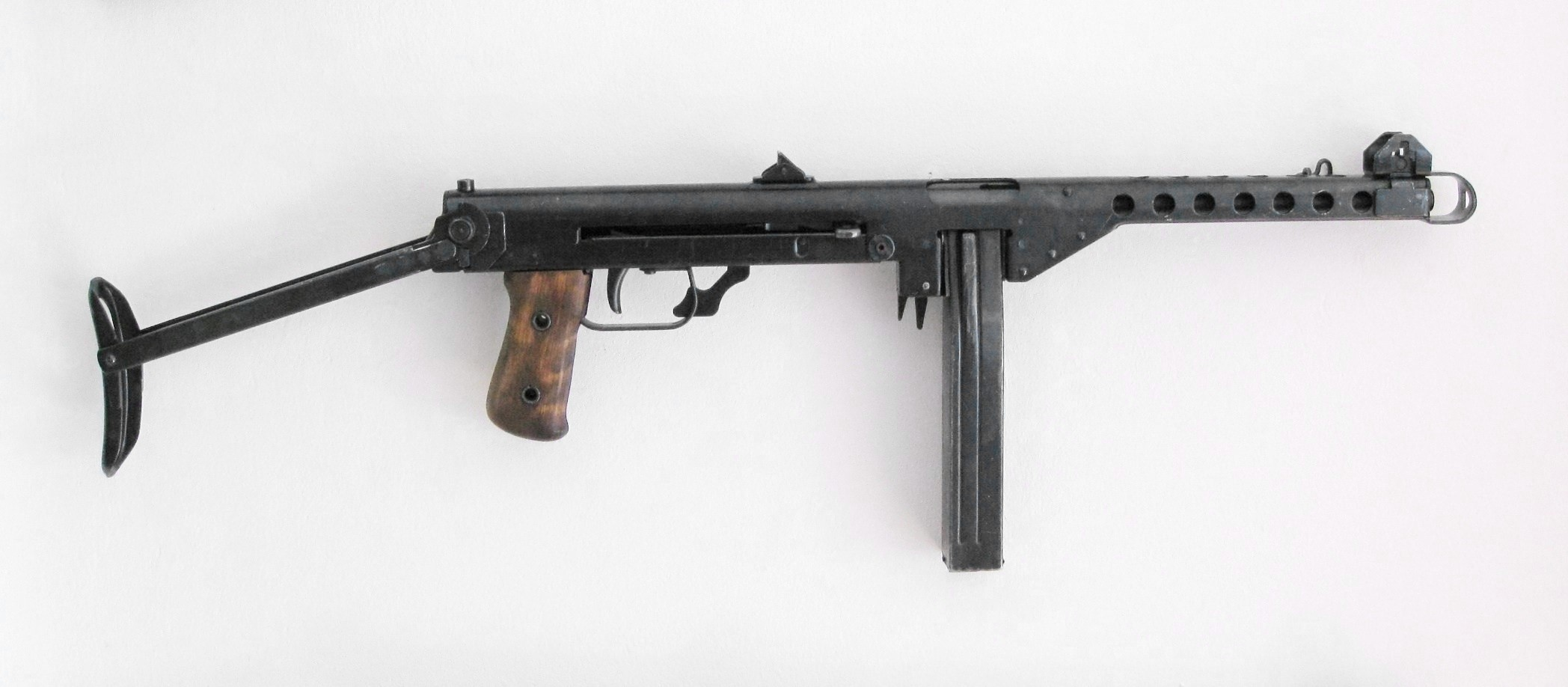
- 9.00 konepistooli 44
- Type: Submachine gun
- Place of origin: Finland

Service history
- In service: 1945–1970's
- Used by: See Users
- Wars: World War II (possibly); Suez Crisis

Production history
- Designed: 1944
- Manufacturer: Tikkakoski
- Produced: 1945 (Finland)

Specifications
- Mass: 2.95 kg (6.5 lb)
- Length: 830 mm (32.7 in) stock extended / 620 mm (24.4 in) stock folded
- Barrel length: 250 mm (9.8 in)
- Cartridge: 9×19mm Parabellum
- Action: Blowback, open bolt
- Rate of fire: 650 rounds/min
- Muzzle velocity: Approx. 400 m/s (1,312 ft/s)
- Effective firing range: 200 m
- Feed system: 20, 50, and 36-round detachable box magazines, 40 and 71-round drum magazines
- Sights: Flip rear sight, fixed blade front sight

The KP m/44 (Finnish: Konepistooli malli 1944, lit. 'Submachine gun, model 1944'), nicknamed "Peltiheikki" or "Pelti-kp", which could be translated as "sheet-metal Heikki" and "sheet-metal machine pistol"/"sheet-metal submachine gun" respectively, was a Finnish 9mm copy and modification of the Soviet mass-produced 7.62 mm submachine gun PPS-43.

== History ==
Starting in 1942, and becoming more common as the Finnish-Soviet Continuation War progressed, both PPS-42 and PPS-43 began showing up among Soviet units, and many were captured by the Finnish Army. The simple construction of these weapons immediately caught the interest of the Finnish arms industry. It was decided that they would try to copy the sheet-steel stamped construction process, but redesigned to use the 9×19mm Parabellum round instead of the original Soviet 7.62×25mm Tokarev and to use the magazine of the Suomi KP/-31 submachine gun, the standard SMG in Finnish service at that time. The new submachine gun was a much cheaper design than the Suomi submachine gun and could be manufactured much faster. All parts were made out of stamped steel (excluding the barrel, bolt and the wood hand grips). The weight of the gun was almost halved compared to the Suomi (2.95 kg vs. 5 kg).

The Finnish Defence Forces ordered 20 000 m/44 submachine guns from Tikkakoski in August 1944. The end of the war saw the order reduced to 10 000 units and the guns were produced during 1945. It is unlikely the m/44 actually saw action during WWII but the gun was used by the Finnish Defence Forces as a training weapon until the 1970s. The Finnish Border Guard and United Nations troops also used the weapon, the latter particularly during the Suez Crisis.

Willi Daugs, Tikkakoski Oy's principal shareholder, took the blueprints with him to Spain after World War II. The gun was produced there at the Oviedo arms factory, who re-designated it DUX-53. In 1953, the West German border guards (Bundesgrenzschutz) adopted the Spanish-made DUX-53 and DUX-59 submachine guns, copied from the PPS-43 by way of the Finnish M/44.

== Users ==
- Finland

== Bibliography ==
- Palokangas, Markku: Sotilaskäsiaseet Suomessa 1918-1988 osa II ja III
- Sotatieteen laitos: Talvisodan historia 1
- Erjola, Risto: Asetuotanto Suomessa toisen maailman sodan aikana
- Harvila, Lauri: Suomen armeijan käyttämät aseet
- Timo Hyytiäinen: Arma Fennica 2, Gummerus, Jyväskylä, 1987
- Thompson, Leroy (23 Mar 2017). The Suomi Submachine Gun. Weapon 54. Osprey Publishing. ISBN 9781472819642.
