= Tikka T3 =

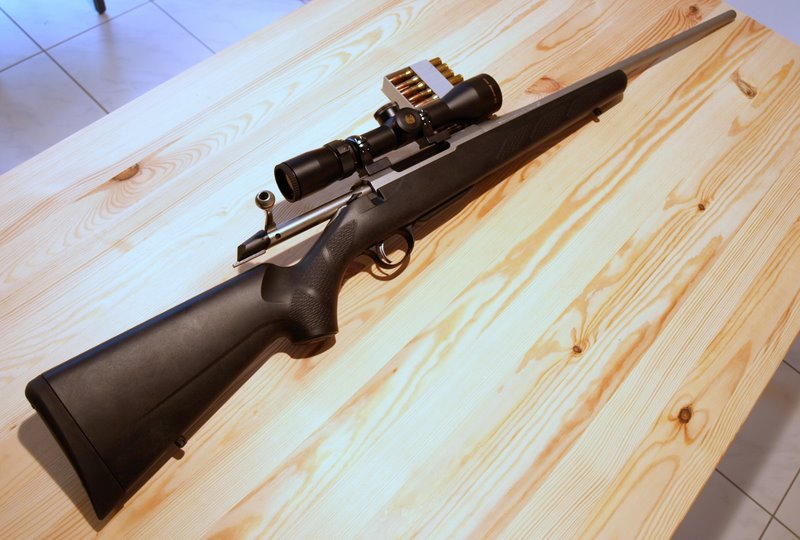
- Tikka T3 rifle
- Type: Rifle
- Place of origin: Finland

Service history
- In service: 2006–present
- Used by: See Users

Production history
- Designer: Sako
- Designed: 2003
- Manufacturer: Sako
- Produced: 2003–present
- Variants: T3; T3x; T3 Tactical PN/GN; C19

Specifications
- Mass: 2.7 kg (6.0 lb) to 5.1 kg (11.2 lb) empty
- Length: 910 mm (35.83 in) / 675 mm (26.57 in) (stock folded) to 1,140 mm (44.88 in)
- Barrel length: 406 mm (15.98 in); 510 mm (20.08 in); 570 mm (22.44 in); 600 mm (23.62 in); 620 mm (24.41 in)
- Cartridge: .204 Ruger.222 Remington.223 Remington.22-250 Remington.243 Winchester.25-06 Remington.260 Remington; 6.5 Creedmoor; 6.5×55mm 6.5 PRC.270 Winchester.270 Winchester Short Magnum; 7mm-08 Remington; 7×64mm 7mm Remington Magnum.308 Winchester/7.62×51mm NATO.30-06 Springfield.300 Winchester Short Magnum.300 Winchester Magnum; 8×57 IS.338 Federal.338 Winchester Magnum; 9.3×62mm
- Action: Bolt action, two locking lugs
- Feed system: 3-, 4-, 5- or 6-round single stack or 10-round double stack detachable box magazine
- Sights: Open or aperture; day or night optics

The Tikka T3 is a series of bolt-action rifles manufactured by Sako under their Tikka brand in Riihimäki, Finland, since 2003.

== Design ==
The series is available in a wide variety of different sight, calibre and stock configurations as well as several barrel lengths. The rifle series was developed by Sako product development team led by Kari Kuparinen.

== Variants ==
=== T3 Tactical PN/GN ===
Used by law enforcement in France. Chambered in 7.62×51mm.

=== T3 TAC ===
Used by the Indian Navy MARCOS. Chambered in 7.62×51mm.

=== Tikka T3x ===
In 2016, the T3 series received an overhaul and the improved models were named Tikka T3x.

The main changes were an enlarged ejection port, a steel recoil lug replacing the T3's aluminium lug, and a metal bolt shroud replacing the T3's plastic.

All improved parts of the T3x are backward compatible with the older T3 models.

=== Colt Canada C19 ===
Licensed variant of the T3 CTR manufactured by Colt Canada.

==== Tikka T3x Arctic ====
Civilian version of the C-19.

== Users ==
- Canada
  - C-19
    - Canadian Rangers
- France
  - T3 Tactical PN/GN
    - French National Police
    - French National Gendarmerie.
- India
  - T3 TAC
- Pakistan
  - T3x TAC
    - Special Service Group
- Ukraine
  - Territorial Defense Forces
- United Kingdom
  - Essex Police
- United States
  - T3x TAC A1
    - Stillwater Oklahoma Special Operations Team

== Gallery ==
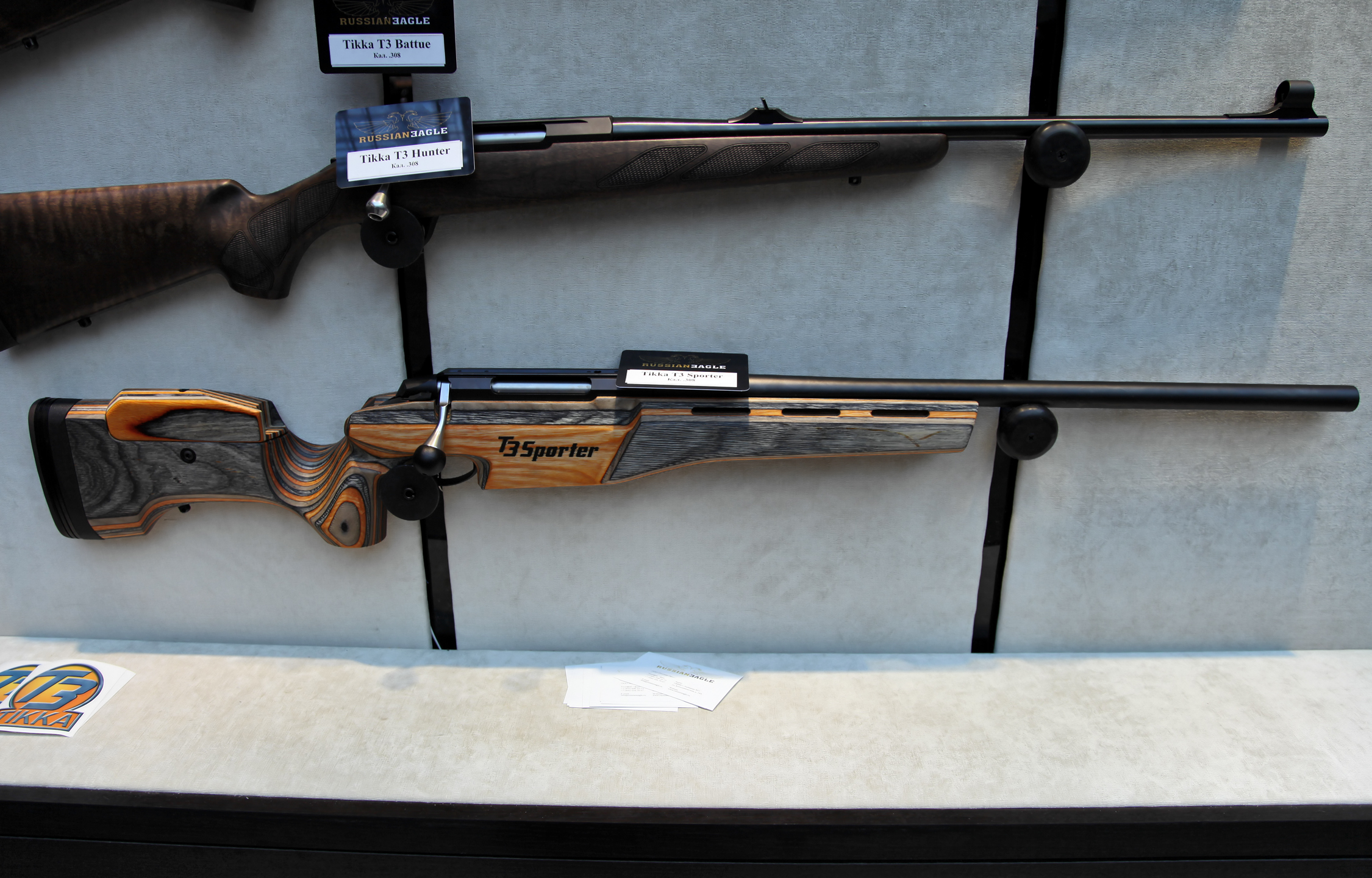
Tikka T3 Hunter and Tikka T3 Sporter rifles

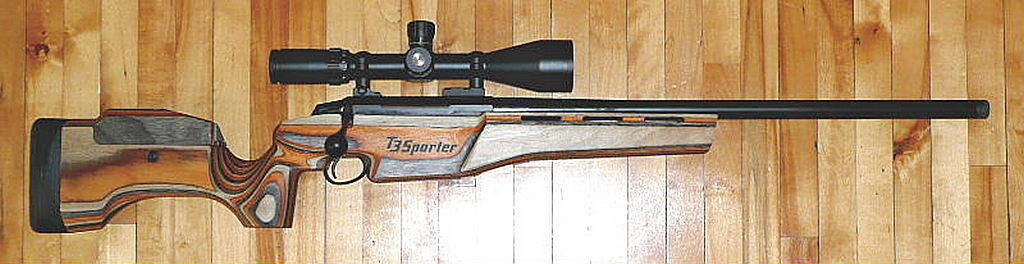
Tikka T3 Sporter .223 Rem with Bushnell scope

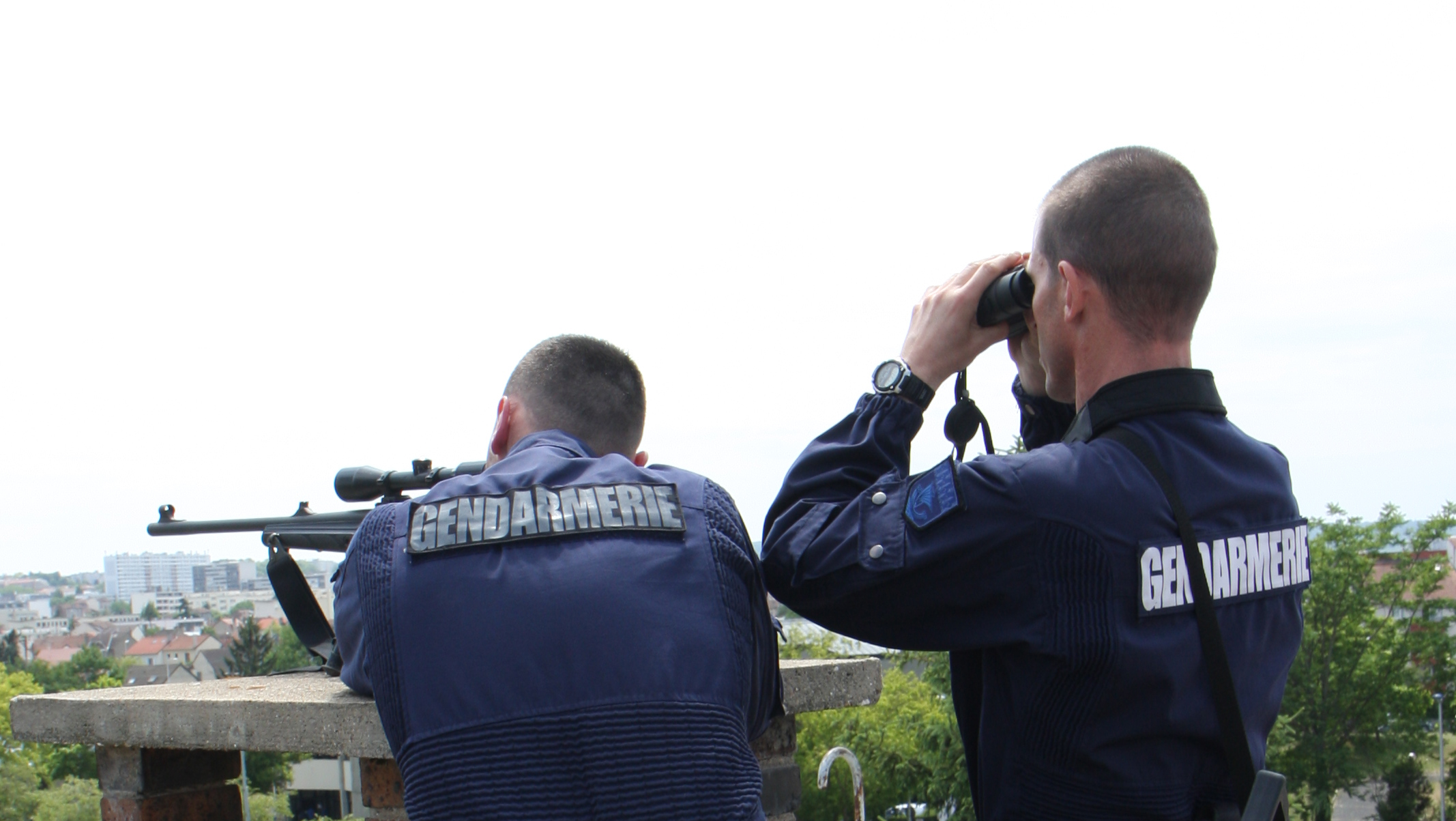
French National Gendarmerie Republican Guard snipers using a Tikka T3 Tactical PN/GN.

== See also ==
- Tikka M55 and Tikka M65, the original Tikkakoski factory rifles on which the Tikka rifle development is based on.
- Sako TRG, Sako long range sniper rifle series.
