= DUX submachine gun =

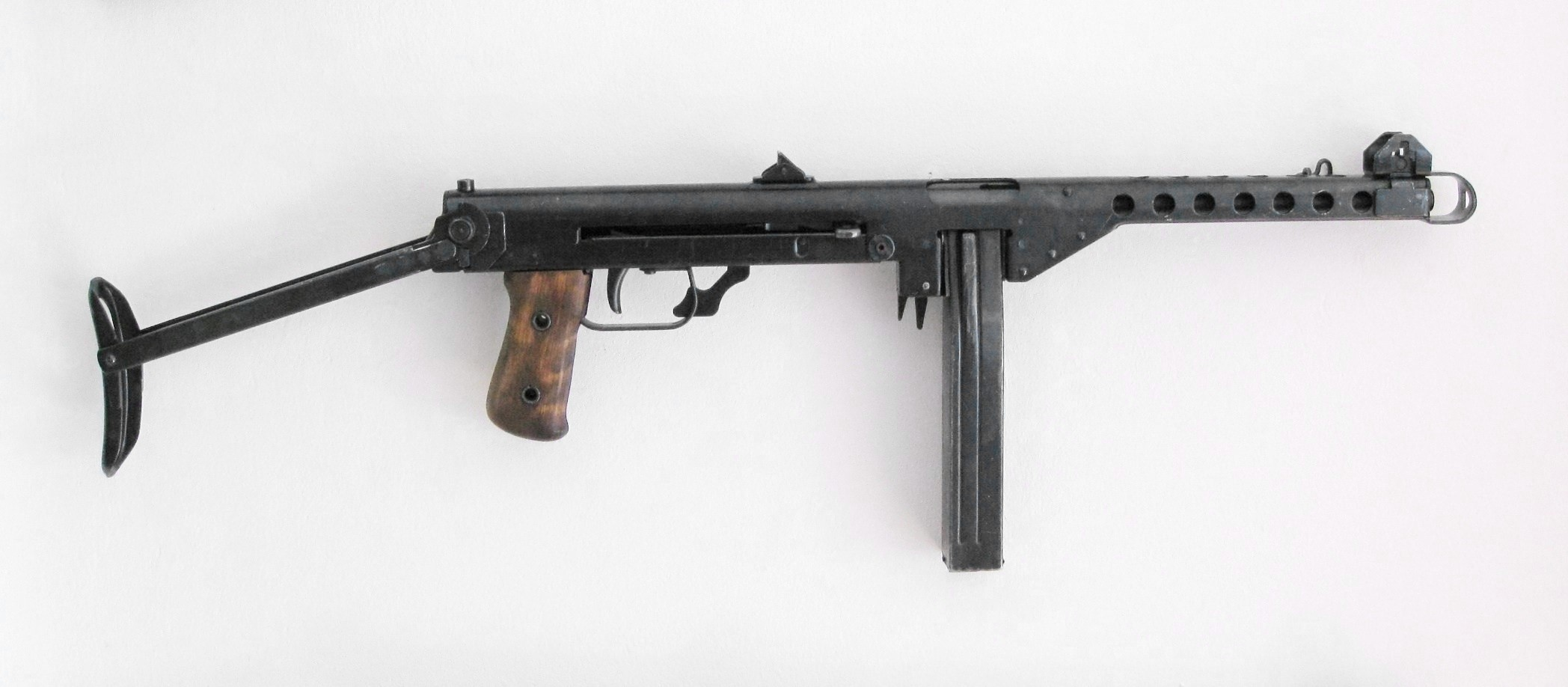
- Finnish KP m/44 on which the DUX was based
- Type: Submachine gun
- Place of origin: Spain

Service history
- Used by: Bundesgrenzschutz

Production history
- Manufacturer: Oviedo Military Arsenal
- Variants: DUX-53, DUX-59

Specifications
- Cartridge: 9×19mm Parabellum
- Caliber: 9mm
- Action: Blowback
- Maximum firing range: 230 ft
- Feed system: Detachable 20 or 36 round box magazine, or 71 round drum magazine
- Sights: Iron

The DUX-53 and DUX-59 were submachine guns manufactured at the Oviedo Arsenal in Spain. They were based directly on the design of the Finnish 9mm Model 44 submachine gun, which in turn was based on the Soviet PPS-43.

== Users ==
- West Germany: Sold to the Bundesgrenzschutz.
