= Tikka M55 =

Finnish rifle

- Type: Rifle; Sniper rifle
- Place of origin: Finland

Service history
- In service: 1968 — Present
- Used by: See Users

Production history
- Designer: Tikkakoski
- Designed: 1967–1968
- Manufacturer: Tikkakoski
- Unit cost: 3000 mk (560 US$)
- Produced: 1968–1989
- Variants: Tikka M76; Tikka LSA55 Standard; Tikka LSA55 Deluxe; Tikka LSA55 Sporter; Tikka M55 Standard; Tikka M55 Deluxe; Tikka M55 Trapper; Tikka M55 Fullstock; Tikka M55 Continental; Tikka M55 Sporter; Tikka M55 Super Sporter

Specifications
- Mass: 2.9 kg (6.4 lb) (Trapper); 3.2 kg (7.1 lb) (Fullstock); 3.3 kg (7.3 lb) (Standard and Deluxe); 4.0 kg (8.8 lb) (Continental); 4.1 kg (9.0 lb) (Sporter); 4.3 kg (9.5 lb) (Super Sporter)
- Length: 1,000 mm (39 in) (Trapper and Fullstock); 1,070 mm (42 in) (Standard and Deluxe); 1,100–1,140 mm (43–45 in) (Sporter and Continental); 1,120 mm (44 in) (Super Sporter)
- Barrel length: 520 mm (20 in) (Trapper and Fullstock); 580 mm (23 in) (Standard and Deluxe); 620 mm (24 in) (Sporter, Super Sporter and Continental)
- Cartridge: .17 Remington.222 Remington.223 Remington.22-250 Remington; 6mm Remington.243 Winchester; 7.62×39mm.308 Winchester
- Action: Bolt action, 90° rotating bolt, two locking lugs
- Effective firing range: 800 m (2,600 ft)
- Feed system: 3, 5 or 10-round detachable single stack box magazine
- Sights: Day or night optics; open or aperture iron sights

The Tikka M55 (originally Tikka M76 and also Tikka LSA55) is a Finnish rifle designed by Finnish firearms company Tikkakoski in 1967–1968. M55 was the first centerfire rifle action designed by Tikkakoski, and it was manufactured from 1968 to 1989. Tikkakoski also developed a long action rifle based on the M55, called Tikka M65. The Tikka M55 was imported to the United States by Ithaca Gun Company.

== History ==
Tikkakoski company, which had been under German ownership, was expropriated in 1944 and handed over to the Soviet Union in 1947 as ruled by the Moscow Armistice. Under the Soviet ownership, the firearms production was run down by the end of 1954. After a group of Finnish businessmen bought Tikkakoski company from the Soviet Union in 1957, the company started focusing again in firearms in 1963, and first prototypes of a repeating centerfire rifle were manufactured in 1967, and the final product, the production of which began in 1968, was named the M76. The M76 was the first repeating centerfire rifle developed and produced completely by Tikkakoski, as the interwar military rifles were built on recycled foreign receivers. Previously Tikkakoski had manufactured actions only for combination guns, shotguns, rimfire rifles and automatic military firearms (mainly submachine guns).

The new rifle got its name from the year 1967 with its numbers in reverse as M76, but the name was changed to LSA55 after export to the United States began in 1969. In 1970 Tikkakoski also introduced a long action derivative rifle, initially called LSA65 (later M65). The name and receiver markings were changed again in 1972, to M55.

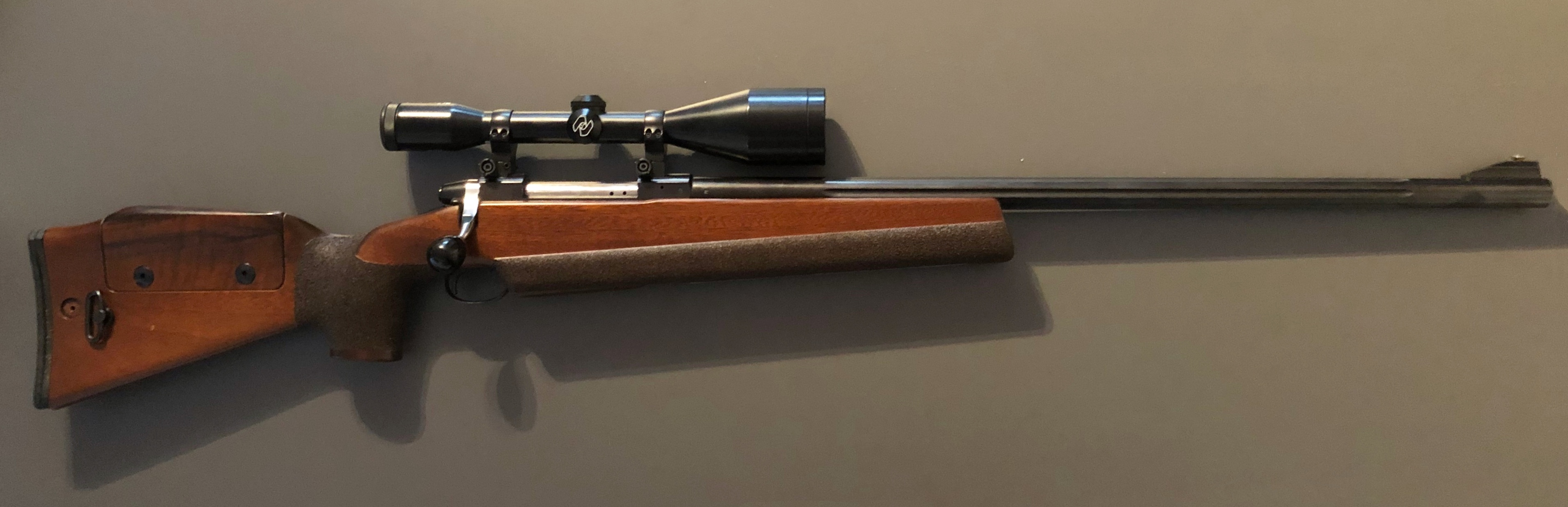
Tikka M65, a long action rifle developed from the M55.

Tikkakoski company was bought by Nokia in 1974 and by SAKO in 1983. After Sako had bought Tikkakoski, a new rifle project, called both Tikka M551 and Sako L581 and nicknamed "Satikka" after SAKO and Tikka, took place, and 1777 rifles were made in 1982 and 1983. The rifle was based on a Tikkakoski prototype from 1981, though Tikkakoski and SAKO also developed a newer prototype called Tikka M555, but it was never put to production. After a review ordered by SAKO from a Finnish gunsmith Jali Timari turned out to criticise the rifle in a rather negative tone, the project was shelved.

In 1987 the Tikkakoski factory was run down, all its machinery was destroyed, and production of Tikka rifles was transferred to SAKO factory at Riihimäki. The last Tikka M55 were assembled in 1989. In 1990 the Tikka M55 was superseded by the Tikka M558 rifle of the Tikka M88 series.

== Design ==
The Tikka M55 action is loosely based on the Mauser action, which Tikkakoski wanted to modernise. The repeating magazine fed rifle features a milled receiver made from special steel, to which a 90° rotating, two-lug cylindrical bolt locks. The receiver has 17 mm dovetail rails milled on its top side for attaching optical sights. The short action is unable to house larger cartridges than .308 Winchester or eject cases longer than 55 mm. The bolt handle serves as a safety lug for the rifle, in case the two locking lugs fail. The later model bolts have a large handle with a plastic ball-shaped end.

The barrel is cut rifled with 6 grooves and depending on the model, either 520 mm (20.47 in), 580 mm (22.83 in) or 620 mm (24.41 in) long. Some models feature iron sights attached to the barrel; rear sight is an open notch and front sight is a hooded post. The barrel is free-floating, also in the Fullstock variant.

The trigger mechanism has an adjustable trigger pull between 1 kg and 3 kg. The trigger pull can be adjusted by rotating a screw inside the magazine well. The trigger has tendency to produce unintentional discharges if the trigger pull is set too light.

The magazine is either a 3, 5 or 10-round single stack single feed stamped steel magazine, and the magazine catch is located in front of the trigger, within the trigger guard. The magazine has 73–74 mm maximum overall length for the cartridge, which allows for the use of long range loads in .308 Winchester.

The sporter variants feature heavy walnut stocks which are convex towards the cheek and concave on the away side, and have UIT rails on their underside and left side, for attaching different accessories, and some Sporter rifles have also an adjustable cheek rest and butt plate.

No synthetic materials have been used in the rifle.

== Variants ==
- Tikka M76 – Early production variant, produced in 1968 and 1969.
- LSA55 (also LSA 55 and LSA-55) – M76 renamed to LSA55 for export purposes; import and marketing by Ithaca Gun Company in the United States. Tikka changed the name of the rifle to LSA55 in 1969.
  - LSA 55 Standard – Standard hunting variant.
  - LSA 55 Deluxe – Premium variant of the LSA55 Standard.
  - LSA 55 Sporter – Heavy barrel variant designed for sports shooting.
- M55 – LSA55 renamed to M55 in 1972.
  - M55 Standard – Standard hunting variant.
  - M55 Deluxe – Premium variant of the M55 Standard.
  - M55 Trapper – Light barrel hunting variant.
  - M55 Fullstock – Light barrel hunting variant with a full-length stock.
  - M55 Continental – Heavy barrel hunting variant.
  - M55 Sporter – Heavy barrel variant designed for sports shooting and for use as a sniper rifle. Improved stock over the LSA55 Sporter.
  - M55 Super Sporter – Improved version of the M55 Sporter.

=== Derivatives ===
- Tikka M65 series – long action rifle based on the Tikka M55.
- Tikka M88 series – successor to the Tikka M55 and M65.
  - Tikka M558 – short action rifle of the Tikka M88 series.

== Users ==
=== Former users ===
- Australia: Used by the Special Air Service Regiment.
- United Kingdom: Used by the Special Air Service and some law enforcement agencies.

== See also ==
- Tikkakoski company
- Tikka M65, long action rifle based on the Tikka M55.
- Tikka T3
