= PPS submachine gun =

PPS
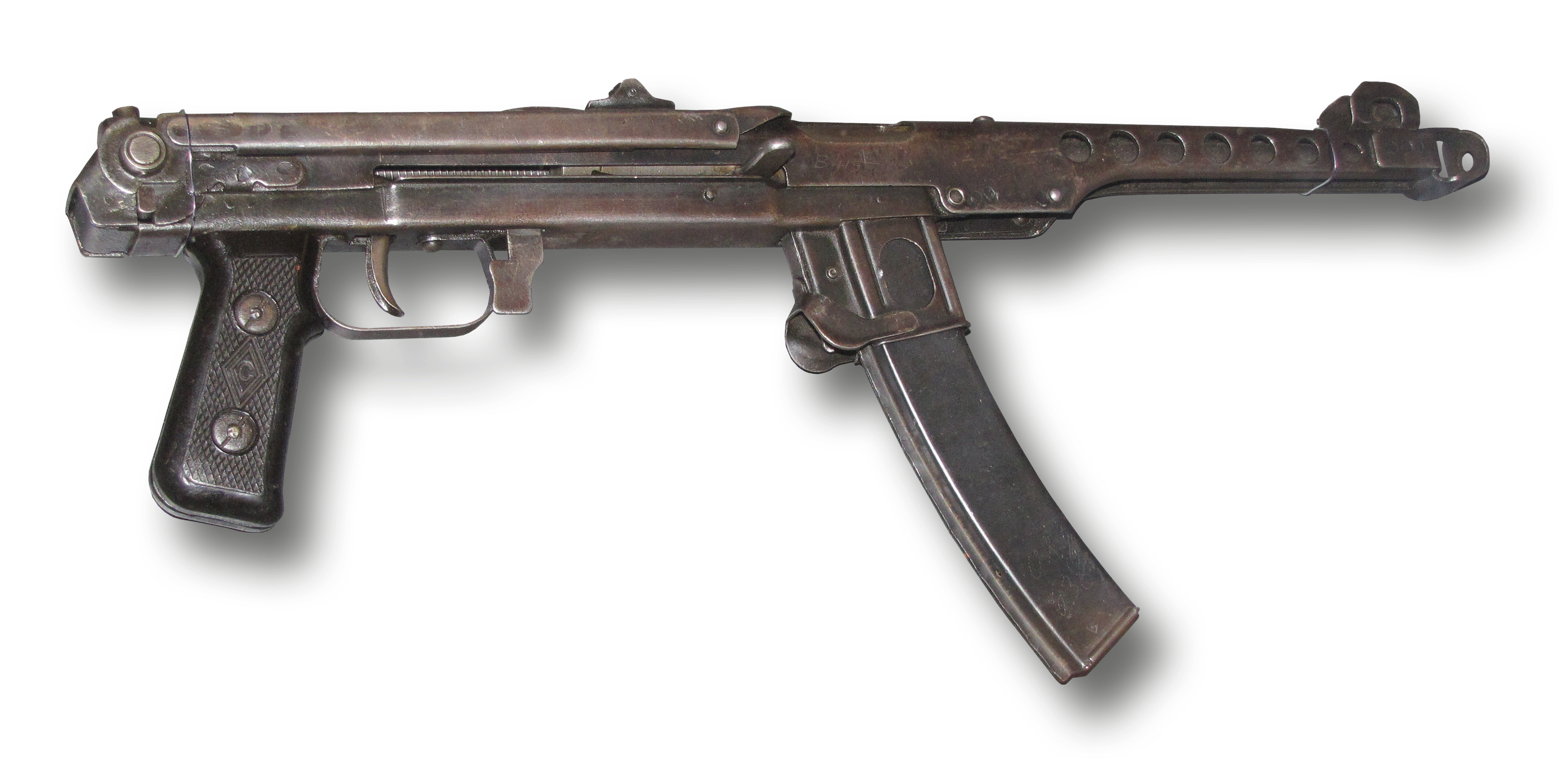
- PPS-43
- Type: Submachine gun
- Place of origin: Soviet Union

Service history
- In service: 1942–1960s (USSR); 1942–present (other countries)
- Used by: See Users
- Wars: World War II; Chinese Civil War; Korean War; First Indochina War; Bay of Pigs Invasion; Vietnam War; Cambodian Civil War; Laotian Civil War; Portuguese Colonial War; Liberian Civil Wars; Rhodesian Bush War; Namibian War of Independence; Russo-Ukrainian War

Production history
- Designer: I. K. Bezruchko-Vysotsky and A. I. Sudayev
- Designed: 1942
- Produced: 1942–1946 (USSR) 1946–1970s (Poland)
- No. built: ~2 million (USSR)
- Variants: PPS-42, PPS-43, M/44, PPS wz. 1943/1952, Type 43

Specifications
- Mass: PPS-42: 2.95 kg (6.50 lb); PPS-43: 3.04 kg (6.7 lb)
- Length: PPS-42: 907 mm (35.7 in) stock extended / 641 mm (25.2 in) stock folded PPS-43: 820 mm (32.3 in) stock extended / 615 mm (24.2 in) stock folded
- Barrel length: PPS-42: 273 mm (10.7 in); PPS-43: 243 mm (9.6 in)
- Cartridge: 7.62×25mm Tokarev
- Action: Blowback, open bolt
- Rate of fire: 500–600 rounds/min (cyclic rate)
- Muzzle velocity: Approx. 500 m/s (1,640 ft/s)
- Effective firing range: 100–150 m
- Maximum firing range: 200 m
- Feed system: 35-round detachable box magazine
- Sights: Flip rear sight, fixed blade front sight

The PPS-43 (Russian: ППС – "Пистолет-пулемёт Судаева" or "Pistolet-pulemyot Sudayeva", in English: "Sudayev's submachine-gun") is a family of Soviet submachine guns chambered in 7.62×25mm Tokarev, developed by Alexei Sudayev as a low-cost personal defense weapon for reconnaissance units, vehicle crews and support service personnel.

The PPS and its variants were used extensively by the Red Army during World War II and were later adopted by the armed forces of several countries of the former Warsaw Pact as well as its many African and Asian allies.

== History ==
Finnish soldiers examining a captured PPS during the Continuation War

The PPS was created in response to a Red Army requirement for a compact and lightweight weapon with similar accuracy and projectile energy to the Soviet PPSh-41 submachine gun widely deployed at the time, with reduced rate of fire, produced at lower material cost and requiring fewer man-hours, particularly skilled labour.

Sudayev was ordered by the State Commission for Armaments to perfect for large-scale production the sub-machine gun design of Lieutenant I.K. Bezruchko-Vysotsky from the Dzerzhinsky Artillery Academy, who had created two prototypes in 1942; the second of these was the basis of Sudayev's gun.

During design, emphasis was placed on simplifying production and eliminating most machining operations; most of the weapon's parts were sheet-steel stamped. These measures reduced the number of machined components to a bare minimum, cutting down machining time by more than half, to 2.7 hours of machining instead of 7.3 hours for the PPSh-41. There were also savings of over 50% in raw steel usage, down to 6.2 kg instead of 13.9 kg, and fewer workers were required to manufacture and assemble the parts. Thanks to the improvements in production efficiency, the Soviet planners estimated that the new gun would have allowed an increase in monthly submachine gun output from 135,000 units to 350,000 weapons.

Prototypes were field tested between 26 April and 12 May 1942; the evaluation commission's report was largely favorable, but still proposed some minor improvements mostly aimed at strengthening the gun's structure. By July, Shpagin had finished his own improved model (PPSh-2), and it was pitted in field trials against the PPS, which was found superior in most respects: accuracy, reliability, maneuverability. (This was apparently a large scale contest, in which 20 designs participated). On July 28, 1942, GAU head Nikolai Yakovlev and his aide Ivan Novikov presented Sudayev's gun to the State Defense Committee for approval. The firearm was accepted into service as the PPS-42 (Russian: Пистолет-пулемёт Судаева—ППС or Pistolet Pulemyot Sudayeva model of 1942). The weapon was put into small-scale production during the Siege of Leningrad; mass production did not commence until early 1943 at the Sestroretsk Arsenal (over 45,000 weapons were produced before being replaced by the improved PPS-43). The factory in charge for the pilot production starting in December 1942 was the Sestroretsk Tool Factory. The first series guns were presented for personal inspection to Andrei Zhdanov and Leonid Govorov in the same month. The full-scale production began in 1943, and the official count of PPS-42 guns produced was 46,572. Most were used during the military trials by the soldiers of the Leningrad Front. The military trials officially took place between January and April 1943.

Due to the massive investment already made in machinery for PPSh-41 production, which was already being produced in more than a million pieces per year, it turned out it would have been uneconomical to completely abandon its production in favor of the PPS. By end of the war some two million PPS-43 submachine guns had been made. Due to the oversupply of the Soviet army with submachine guns after the war, production of the PPS in the Soviet Union ceased in 1946.

In the last two years of the war, Sudayev continued to experiment with improvements for his submachine gun. Six of his later prototype models, made in 1944 and 1945, are found in the Military Historical Museum of Artillery, Engineers and Signal Corps. These have variations in bolt shape and weight, as well as more obvious outward differences like a wooden, non-folding stock or a folding bayonet.

The PPS remained in service with some Soviet forces until the mid-1950s. Among the last to relinquish it were crews of armored vehicles and the Naval Infantry. Some World War II-era weapons found their way to the Chinese People's Liberation Army and were subsequently captured by UN forces in the Korean War.

== Design details ==
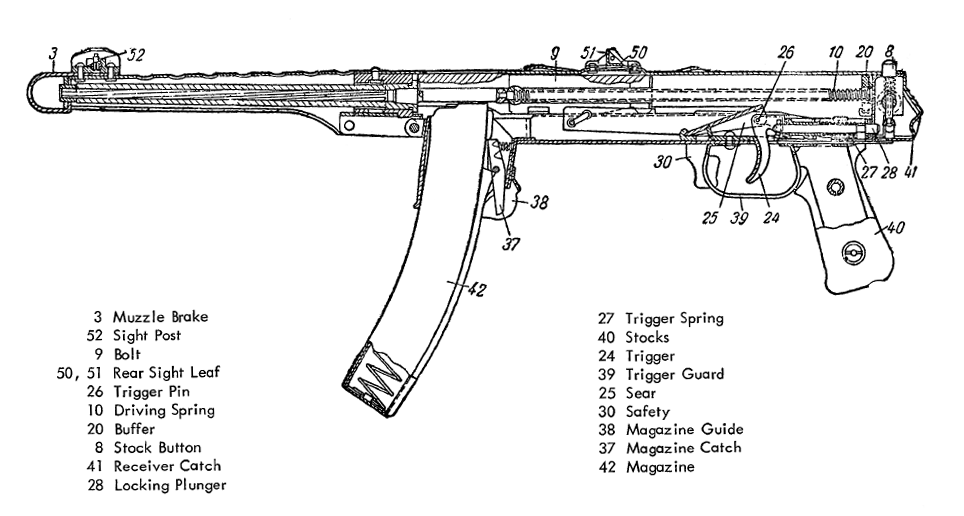
Section figure

=== Operating mechanism ===
The PPS is an automatic blowback-operated weapon that fires from an open bolt. The bolt is cylindrical in shape and contains a spring-loaded claw extractor, which pulls the empty case out of the chamber to be ejected. The ejector is mounted at the head of the recoil spring guide rod, which runs through a hole in the bolt. The charging handle is integral to the bolt and is located on the right side; it reciprocates during firing. Early versions of the PPS had a fixed but replaceable firing pin, held in place by the extractor spring. Pulling the trigger releases the bolt, which moves forward, stripping a round from the magazine, chambering it and striking the primer in one motion.

=== Features ===
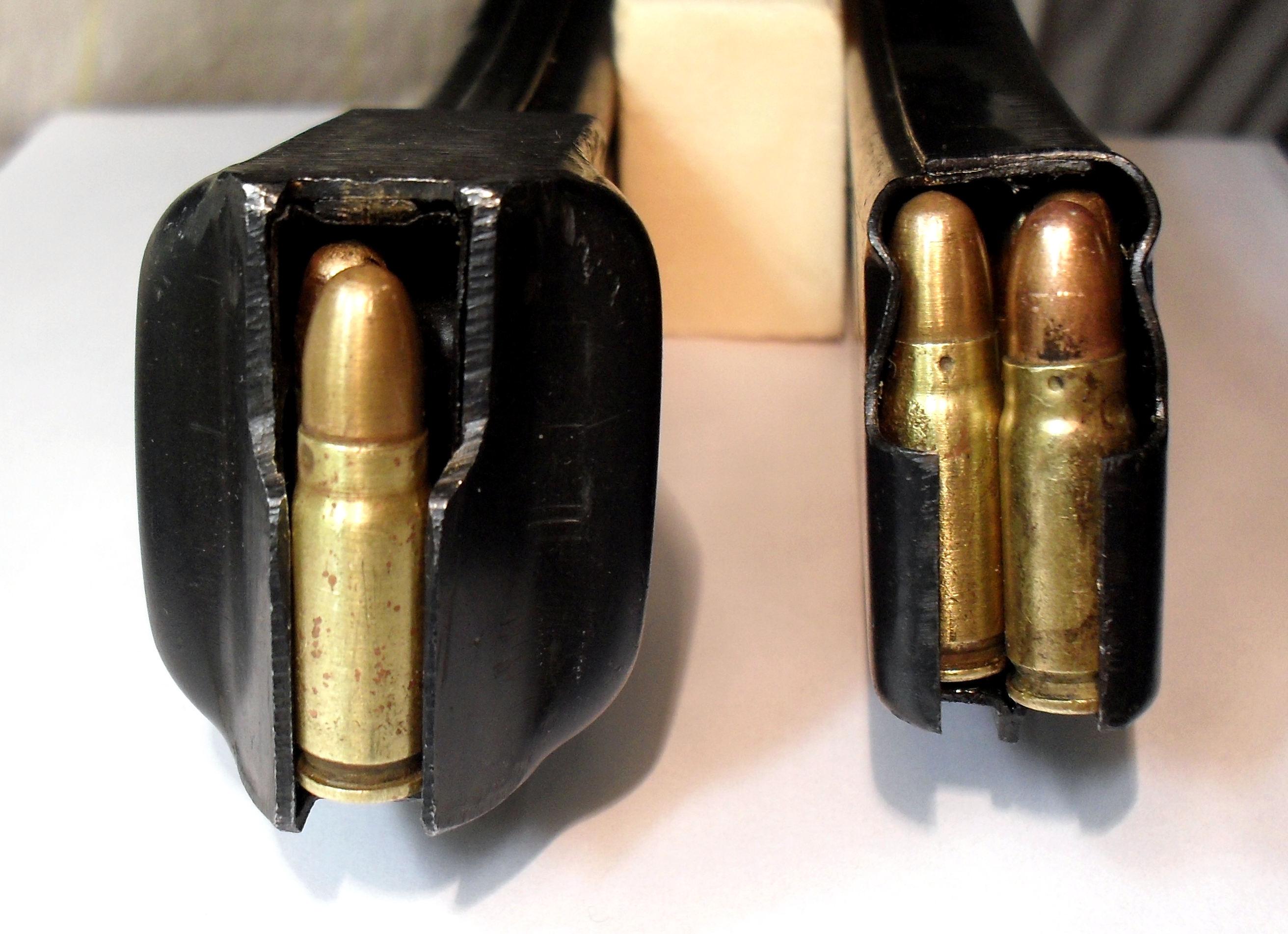
PPSh vs PPS box magazine

The PPS has a trigger mechanism that allows only fully automatic fire and a manual safety that secured them against accidental discharges. When in the "safe" position (engaged by sliding a metal bar forward of the trigger guard), both the bolt and trigger are disabled.

The weapon is fed from curved 35-round box magazines. They are not interchangeable with magazines used in the PPSh-41, nor can the gun use drum magazines. The PPS-43 magazine was significantly improved over the magazine from the PPSh-41, which contributed to greater reliability. The largest change being the transition to a "Double-Feed" design, so the double-stacked rounds are not bottle-necked into a single-stack at the feed lips. Like the PPSh-41, it is chambered for the 7.62×25mm Tokarev M1930 pistol cartridge.

The submachine gun's rifled barrel (with 4 right-hand grooves) is mounted in a perforated sheet metal heat guard and is equipped with a crude muzzle brake, consisting of a strip of steel bent into a U-shape that deflects exiting muzzle gases to the sides and backwards, thus compensating for recoil.

A folding stock is attached to the receiver with a spring-loaded catch button on the top. The stock folds up and over the receiver top cover and the weapon can be fired in this arrangement. The submachine gun also has a pistol grip but was not provided with a forward grip as the magazine well was intended to fulfill this role. The PPS was usually supplied with two magazine pouches, an oil bottle, bore brush and sling.

The PPS-43 was highly cost effective and easy to manufacture due to its efficient and simple, largely sheet metal design. Despite its crudeness, it has been described as controllable and reliable.

=== Sights ===
The PPS is fitted with a set of open-type iron sights consisting of a fixed front post protected from impact by two sheet metal plates and a flip rear sight with two pivoting notches, for firing at 100 and 200 m.

== Variants ==
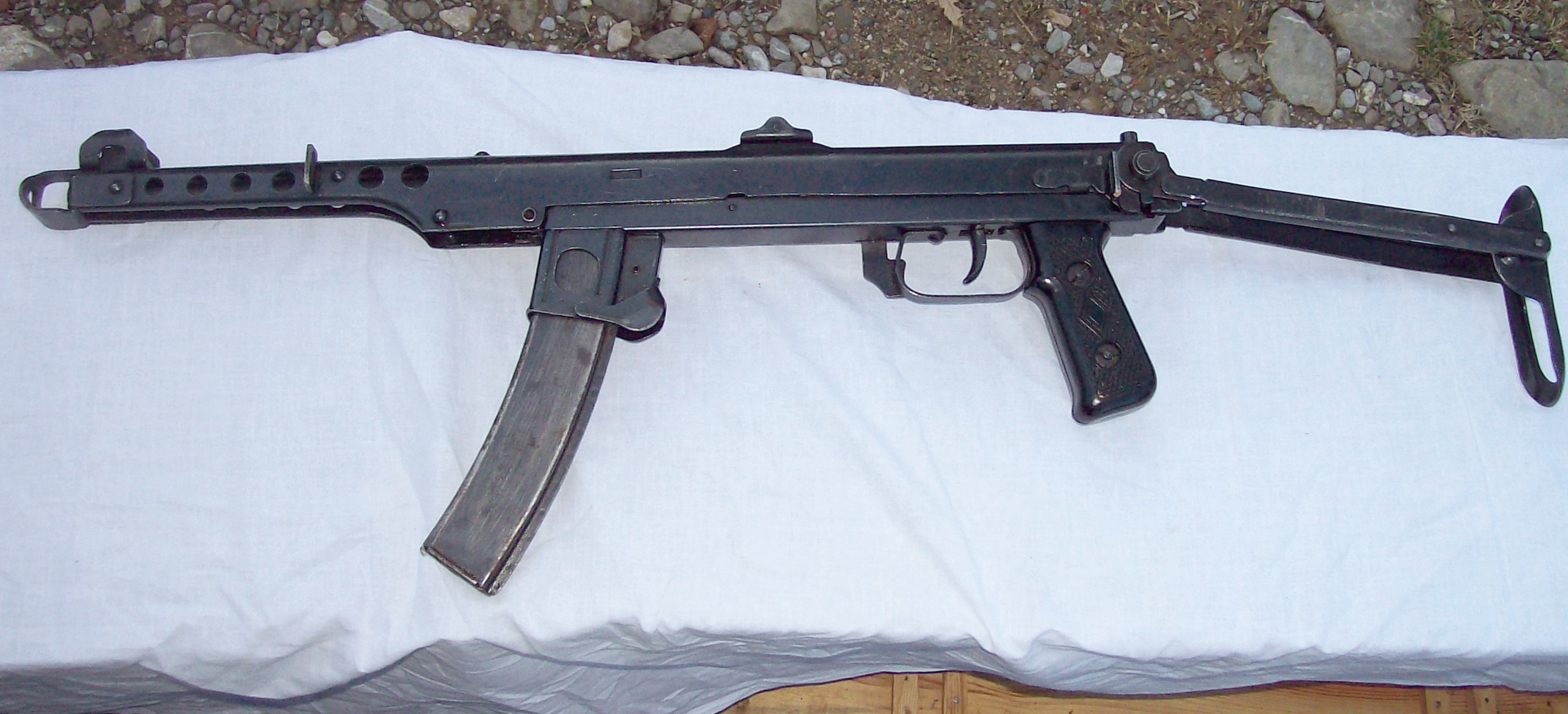
A Chinese-made Type 54 variant.

- Soviet Union
  - PPS-42 (ППС обр.1942 г.)
  - PPS-43 (ППС обр.1943 г.) Towards the middle of 1943 the modernized PPS-43 entered production; efforts were made to improve manufacturing and safety. The ventilated heat shield was integrated with the upper receiver cover, both the barrel and shoulder stock were shortened, the stock's locking mechanism was simplified, the casing ejector was moved to the head of the recoil spring guide rod, the magazine well angle was increased in the receiver in order to enhance feeding reliability and the safety was improved to block the trigger and lock the bolt in either the open or closed positions. PPS-43s were seldom captured by the Germans, unlike the PPS-42, as the Red Army was no longer on the defensive in 1943.
- Finland M/44 submachine gun. The M/44 was a modified copy with minor differences to the original PPS-43, including a straight rather than curved box magazine. It fired the 9×19mm Parabellum pistol round and accepted the box and drum magazines designed for the Suomi M/31. It was later modified to accept the 36-round box magazine of the Carl Gustav SMG.
- Poland Between 1946 and 1955, the PPS-43 was manufactured in various plants, including H. Cegielski – Poznań (marked with 'H.C.P.' in circle, then with '6' in circle), Wifama Łódź (marked with '53' in oval) and Baildon Steel Works (marked with '12' in circle).
  - PPS wz. 43, the PPS-43 which was license-produced from 1946
  - PPS wz. 43/52, a modified version of the PPS-43, with the folding metal stock replaced with a fixed wooden buttstock. This was mounted to the receiver end plate using two inserts and the receiver take-down hook was bent downwards to accommodate the change. The buttstock has a compartment carved inside of it that contains a standard cleaning kit; the side of the butt has a sling loop. This modification was meant to increase the accuracy of the PPS submachine gun, but minimal gains in accuracy were offset by the increase in weight and size of the PPS wz. 43/52 in comparison to the original PPS-43.
  - a training version built in Poland, chambered for the .22 Long Rifle rimfire cartridge (fed using standard PPS-43 magazines but modified with an aluminum reduction insert)
  - In 2010, Pioneer Arms, of Radom, Poland, began producing a semiautomatic-only version of the PPS design, called the PPS-43C. The gun, sold with its stock fixed in the closed position, is legally considered a pistol in the United States. The gun is of a closed bolt, hammer fired, blow back operated design as opposed to the open-bolt design of the PPS-43. According to a report in the July 20, 2012 edition of Shotgun News, the PPS-43C utilizes many parts from unissued PPS-43 submachine guns mounted on new PPS-43C receivers. Modifications in the United States market are common and include restoring the functionality of the folding stock, which classifies the weapon as a short-barreled rifle with a 9.5" barrel. This is legal if a tax stamp is obtained from the Bureau of Alcohol, Tobacco, Firearms and Explosives. Other modifications include replacing the existing muzzle brake with a barrel thread to allow the attachment of suppressors and modern muzzle brakes; conversions into 9×19mm or 9×23mm Winchester are also performed.
- China – Type 54, license-produced version of PPS-43
- West Germany – In 1953, the border guards (Bundesgrenzschutz) adopted the Spanish-made DUX-53 and DUX-59 submachine guns, copied from the PPS-43 by way of the Finnish M/44.
- Vietnam – K-50M also borrowed elements from the PPS design
- Hungary in the 1950s Hungary combined basic features of the PPS-43 with the bolt safety of the PPSh-41 in the unsuccessful M53.

== Users ==
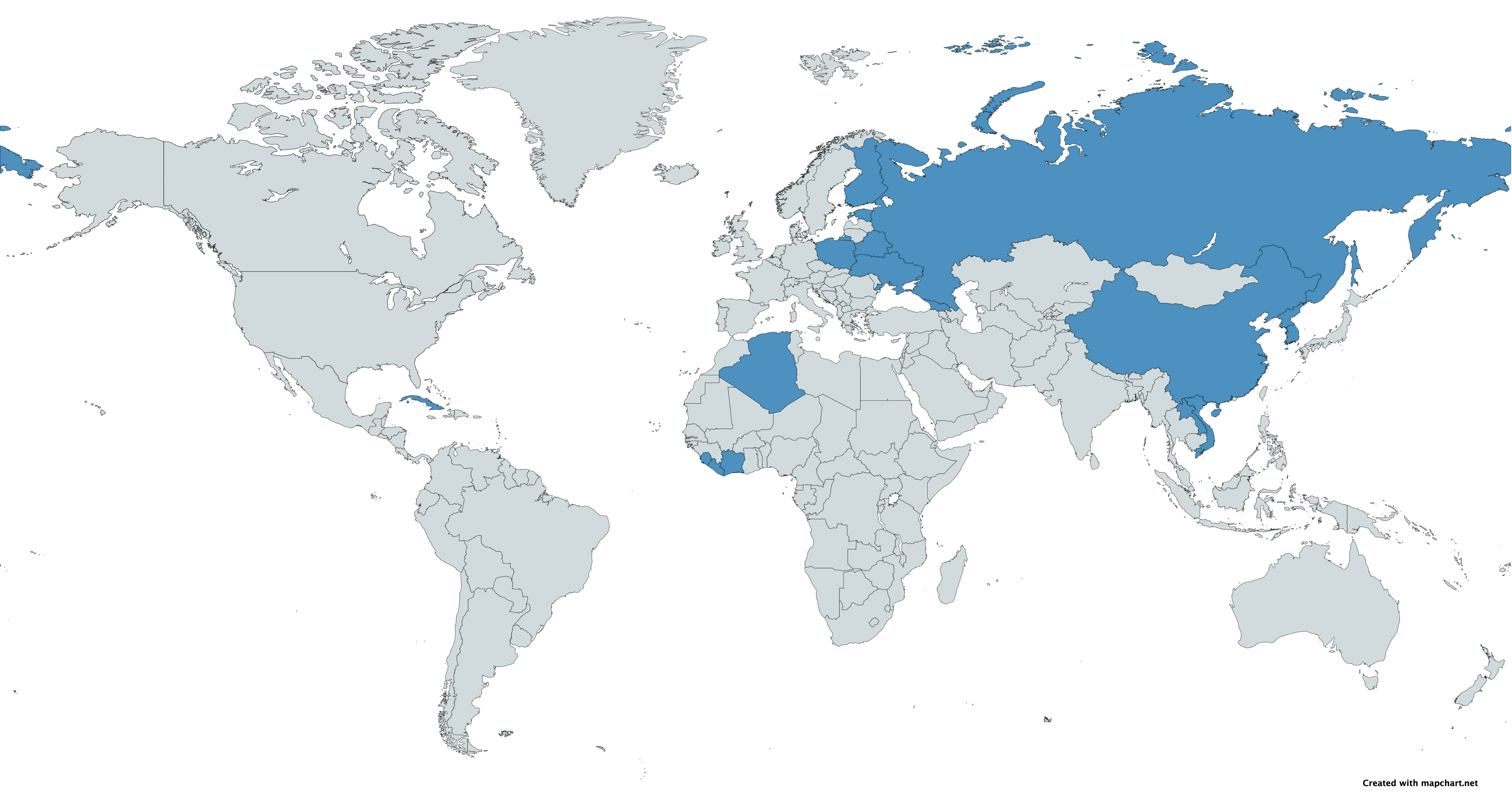
Map with PPS users in blue

- Algeria
- Belarus: in the early 1990s, PPS43s remained in storage. Around the same time foreign 9×19mm submachine guns were tested by military personnel and the Ministry of Internal Affairs; however, according to the test results, it was found that the APS automatic pistols and PPS-43 submachine guns that were in storage were superior to the Jatimatic submachine guns, as well as compact submachine guns of other systems (Ingram, and Mini Uzi)
- China: Used Chinese Type 54s.
- Cuba: Polish PPS wz. 1943/1952 used by militia.
- Estonia: Used by Estonian partisans after World War II
- Finland: Captured from the Soviets, and created their own copy, the KP m/44 submachine gun
- Georgia
- Grenada
- Ivory Coast: PPS-43
- Laos
- Liberia
- Nazi Germany: Captured from the Soviets, designated as the MP-718(r) (PPS-42) and MP-719(r) (PPS-43)
- North Korea: Uses both Soviet PPS submachine guns and Chinese Type 54s.
- Poland: Introduced in 1943 on Polish People's Army. Since 1946 produced as PPS wz 43.
- Russia: Thousands reportedly captured by Wagner Group from a Ukrainian cache in Soledar.
  - Russian separatist forces in Donbas
- São Tomé and Príncipe
- Soviet Union: Built PPS-42, and PPS-43
- South Korea: Captured from North Korean and Chinese during the Korean war.
- Sierra Leone
- Ukraine: In the early 1990s, PPS-43s were issued to paramilitary security units and the patrol police. Used as sidearm for several Ministry of Internal Affairs units. As of July 14, 2005, the Ministry of Defense had at least 25,000 units in storage. In 2007, 800 surplus PPS submachine guns were sold (50 units to Austria, 610 units to the UK, 100 units to Norway and 40 units to the Czech Republic); as of August 15, 2011, at least 18,000 units remained in the custody of the Ministry of Defense.
- Vietnam
  - North Vietnam: Used by North Vietnamese and Vietcong in the Vietnam War. Known to be used as the K43.
- Yugoslavia

== Bibliography ==
- Ezell, Edward Clinton (1986). The AK47 Story: Evolution of the Kalashnikov Weapons. Harrisburg, PA: Stackpole Books. ISBN 978-0-8117-0916-3.
- McNab, Chris (20 May 2014). Soviet Submachine Guns of World War II: PPD-40, PPSh-41 and PPS. Weapon 33. Osprey Publishing. ISBN 978-1-78200-794-4.
- Woźniak, Ryszard (2001). Encyklopedia najnowszej broni palnej—tom 3 M-P (in Polish). Warsaw, Poland: Bellona. ISBN 83-11-09149-8.
