= Suomi KP/-31 =

Finnish submachine gun

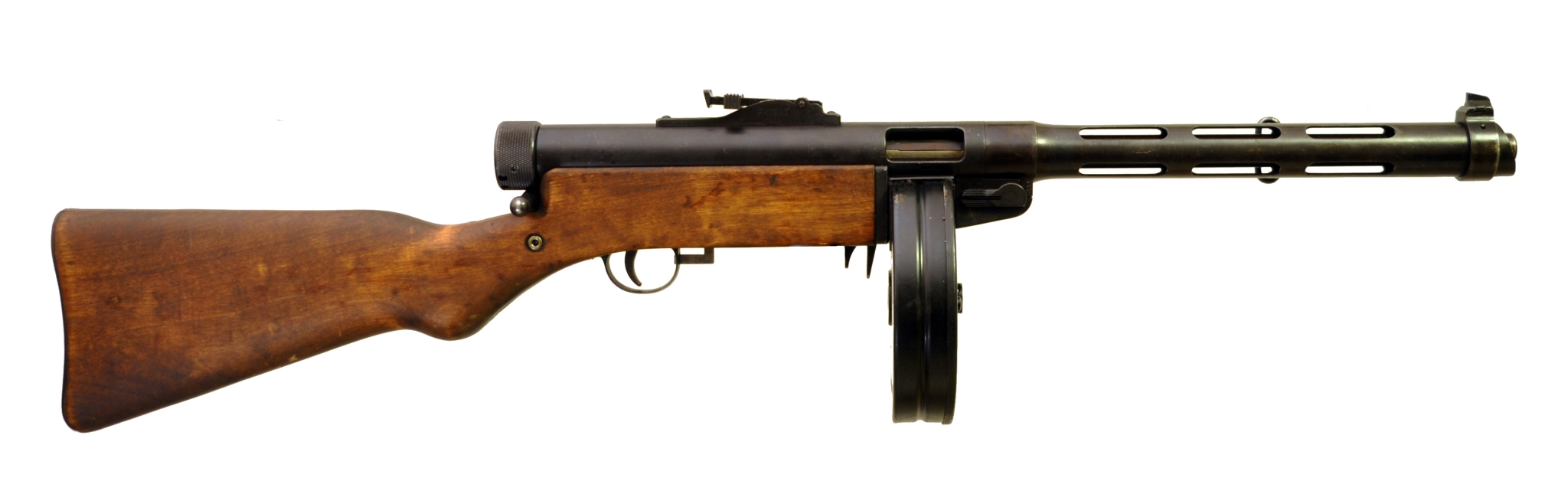
- Suomi KP/-31
- Type: Submachine gun
- Place of origin: Finland

Service history
- In service: 1931–1980s
- Used by: See Users
- Wars: Chaco War; Spanish Civil War; Integralist Uprising; World War II (Winter War, Continuation War, and Lapland War); 1948 Arab–Israeli War; Congo Crisis

Production history
- Designer: Aimo Lahti
- Designed: late 1920s
- Manufacturer: Tikkakoski
- Produced: 1931–1953
- No. built: Approx. 80,000
- Variants: Kpist m/37; Kpist m/37-39; Kpist m/37-39F; Lettet-Forsøgs; Madsen-Suomi; Hispano Suiza MP43/44

Specifications
- Mass: 4.6 kg (10.14 lb)
- Length: 870 mm (34.3 in); 925 mm (36.4 in) (SJR); 740 mm (29.1 in) (bunker version)
- Barrel length: 314 mm (12.4 in)
- Cartridge: 9×19mm Parabellum, 7.65mm Parabellum
- Action: Straight Blowback
- Rate of fire: 750–900 rounds/min
- Muzzle velocity: 396 m/s (1,299 ft/s)
- Effective firing range: 200 m
- Feed system: 20-, 36- or 50-round box, 40- or 71-round drum. Also modified German MP 38 & MP 40 32-round box magazine
- Sights: Front blade, rear notch

The Suomi KP/-31 (Finnish: Suomi-konepistooli m/31, lit. 'machine pistol Suomi m/31') is a Finnish submachine gun that was mainly used during World War II. It is a descendant of the M-22 prototype and the KP/-26 production model, which was revealed to the public in 1925. It entered service in Finland in 1931, and remained in use until the 1980s.

The Suomi KP/-31 is regarded by many as one of the most successful submachine guns of World War II. It also had a profound effect on the conflict beyond Finland as the Soviet authorities, who had been dismissive of submachine guns, were persuaded of their fatal efficiency by the Finnish forces in the Winter War of 1939–1940. Though a relatively early design, the Suomi was a formidable weapon: highly controllable and with accuracy similar to that of the mass-produced PPSh-41 but at the cost of a significantly higher mass to absorb recoil, with a lower rate of fire and an equally large magazine capacity. Its major disadvantages were its higher weight, high maintenance requirements and high production cost, which led to the later introduction of the KP/-44, a close copy of the Soviet PPS-43 but accepting the existing magazines and drums for the KP/-31.

The M-22 and KP/-26 were made by Konepistooli Oy, founded by Master Armorer Aimo Lahti, Captain V. Korpela, Lieutenant Y. Koskinen and Lieutenant L. Boyer-Spoof. The Suomi KP/-31 was designed by Koskinen and Lahti.

== History ==
The Suomi KP/-31 went into serial production in 1931 by Tikkakoski Oy which was owned by German arms dealer Willi Daugs and most of these weapons were bought by the Finnish Defence Forces. The Finnish Defence Forces were equipped with about 4000 Suomi KP/-31 submachine guns when the Winter War started. During the course of the war, the design was altered in February 1942 with the addition of a muzzle brake, which increased the submachine gun's overall length by 55 mm and weight by half a pound. The revised version was designated KP/-31 SJR (suujarru, or "muzzle brake"). Aimo Lahti was displeased with this revision, believing that it decreased muzzle velocity and reduced the weapon's reliability, and even sought in vain to have the unknown designer of the brake court-martialed. Ultimately, roughly half of the KP/-31s in Finnish service were of the SJR version.

The KP/-31 was unusual in that it had a replaceable barrel secured with four lugs rather than threads. Soldiers were issued at least one spare barrel. In close combat the weapon would overheat in sustained automatic fire, requiring the barrel to be changed. This was effected using a mitten or piece of thick cloth to secure, rotate, and remove the barrel jacket. Then the user would use the point of a puukko knife or a cleaning rod to loosen and remove the hot barrel. It was easy to then slide in and lock a fresh new barrel, secure the jacket, and resume firing.

The Finnish military initially issued it with the 20-round staggered-column magazine and early 40-round sissilipas ("ranger magazine") drum. The magazine's capacity was found to be too small for sustained fire. Up to 5 additional rounds could be loaded into it, but it was found that this damaged or over-compressed the springs and caused it to fail. The drum was found to be hard to reload in action because the backplate had to be taken off and the bullets loaded inside tip-downwards. The drum also had an open "shot count window" in the bottom of the drum; the numbers 1 to 40 were stamped on the feed plate and lined up with the window to indicate the shots remaining. However, it naturally let in dirt and debris that led to jams. Aimo Lahti experimented with a 60-round Thompson-type spring-loaded clockwork drum to replace it, but it was never adopted.

They were later replaced during the Continuation War with the Swedish-designed 50-round "coffin" magazine and improved 71-round drum. The "coffin" magazine carried more ammunition than the box magazine and was lighter than the 40-round drum. However, it was complicated and prone to jamming or failure if it was damaged, reassembled incorrectly, or the springs gave out. It would also fail to fire or feed unless it was properly seated in the magazine well. The "coffin" magazine was withdrawn from service in 1943 in favor of the 71-round drum. The larger drum was a design by the weapon's less-well-known co-designer, Lieutenant Y. Koskinen, that was an improvement of the 40-round drum. It had a removable front-plate that was quicker to reassemble and was cocked by rotating the mainspring for up to four detents, allowing the drum to be partially reloaded. It was first released commercially in 1935 (eponymously named the M/Koskinen drum) and entered into Finnish service in January, 1936. In the 1950s the magazine wells on the KP/-31s were modified in order to use the Swedish Carl Gustav m/45b's 36-round double-column magazine.

=== Tactics ===
Initially the KP/-31 was issued as a substitute for a light machine gun, however, it proved inadequate in that role. Instead, soldiers learned by trial and error how to use submachine guns to the best effect. By the time of the Continuation War, Finnish doctrine had been altered to include both a KP/-31 and a light machine gun (usually a captured Degtyaryov) in every infantry squad. By 1943 this had been expanded to two KP/-31s per squad. KP/-31 production continued with the intention of adding a third submachine gun to each squad, but this plan was shelved in 1944 when the Continuation War ended.

=== Sales ===
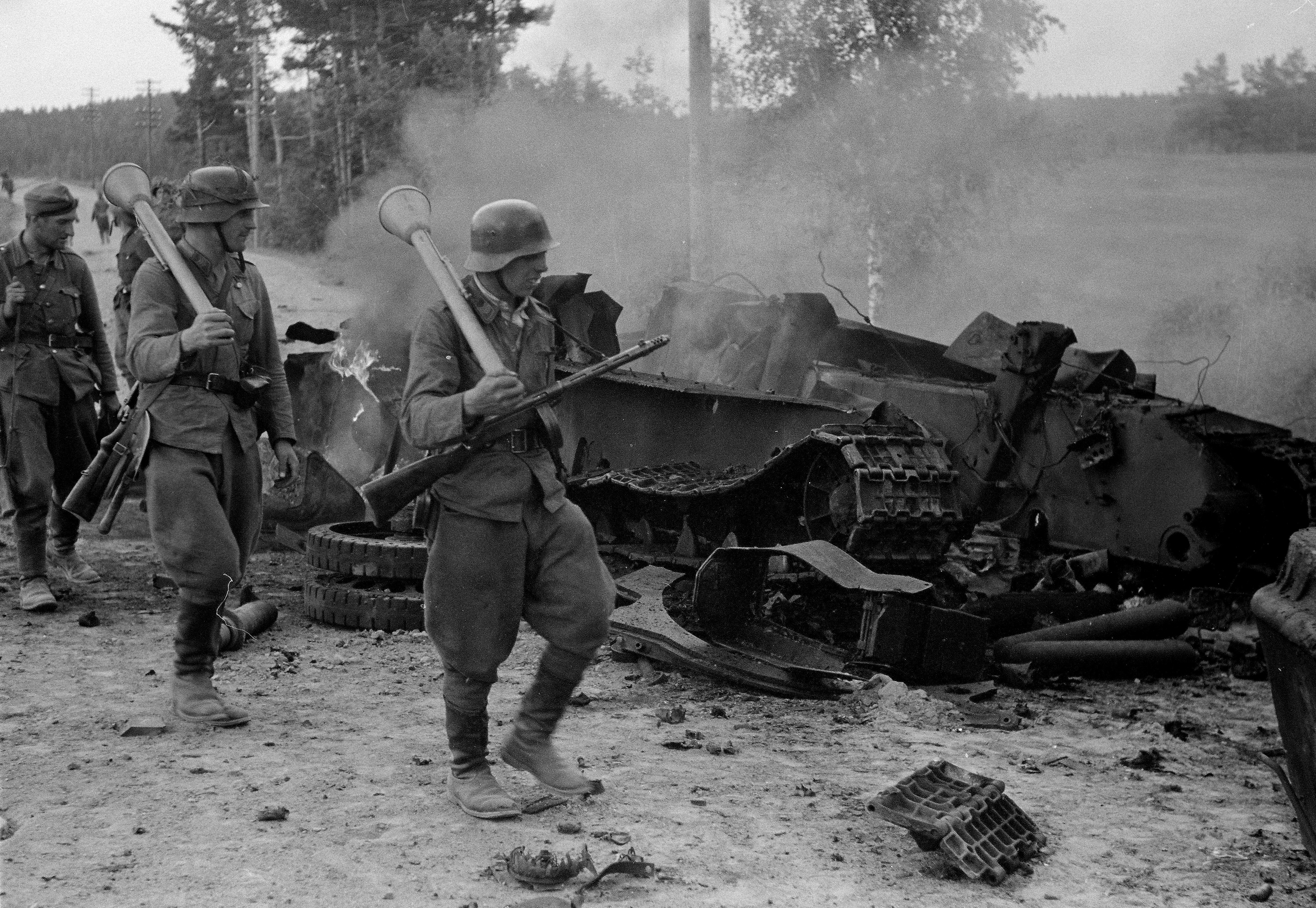
Finnish soldier armed with a Suomi KP/-31 SJR (muzzle brake version) and a Panzerfaust walks past a Soviet T-34 tank, destroyed by detonation, in the Battle of Tali-Ihantala

Finland focused on sales to South America and the Baltic States. It was sold to both sides during the Spanish Civil War; about 300 were confiscated by France from interned Republican troops in 1939. Estonia, France, and Poland bought some before World War Two that were later captured. Germany and their Axis allies Bulgaria and Croatia bought some after the war began. The German Armeeoberkommando Norwegen and Finnish SS Troops were issued the KP/-31 from Finnish stores. A weld-on magazine adapter was created by the Germans to convert MP38/MP40 magazines to feed in the KP/-31 to simplify logistics.

The Suomi KP was also manufactured under license. It was made in Sweden as the Husqvarna Kulsprutepistol Kpist M37 with a shorter 8.4-inch [213 mm] barrel. It was chambered for the weak 9mm Browning Long [9×20mmSR] cartridge, which required a rear-slanting magazine well. It used a 56-round four-column "coffin" magazine designed by Linde AB and manufactured by the Carl Gustav State Rifle Factory. They later adopted the redesigned Husquarna Kpist M37/39 chambered in 9mm Parabellum with a standard-length barrel [314mm] and 50-round "coffin" magazine. The Danish adopted it as the Madsen Maskinpistol M/41. It has distinctive protective metal “ears” on either side of the front post sight and used the 20-round magazine. The Swiss adopted it as the Hispano-Suiza Machinenpistole MP43 and issued it with the "coffin" magazine. The later MP43/44 had a fixed square notch rather than adjustable rear sights and the barrel jacket was modified to take a bayonet mount.

== Design ==
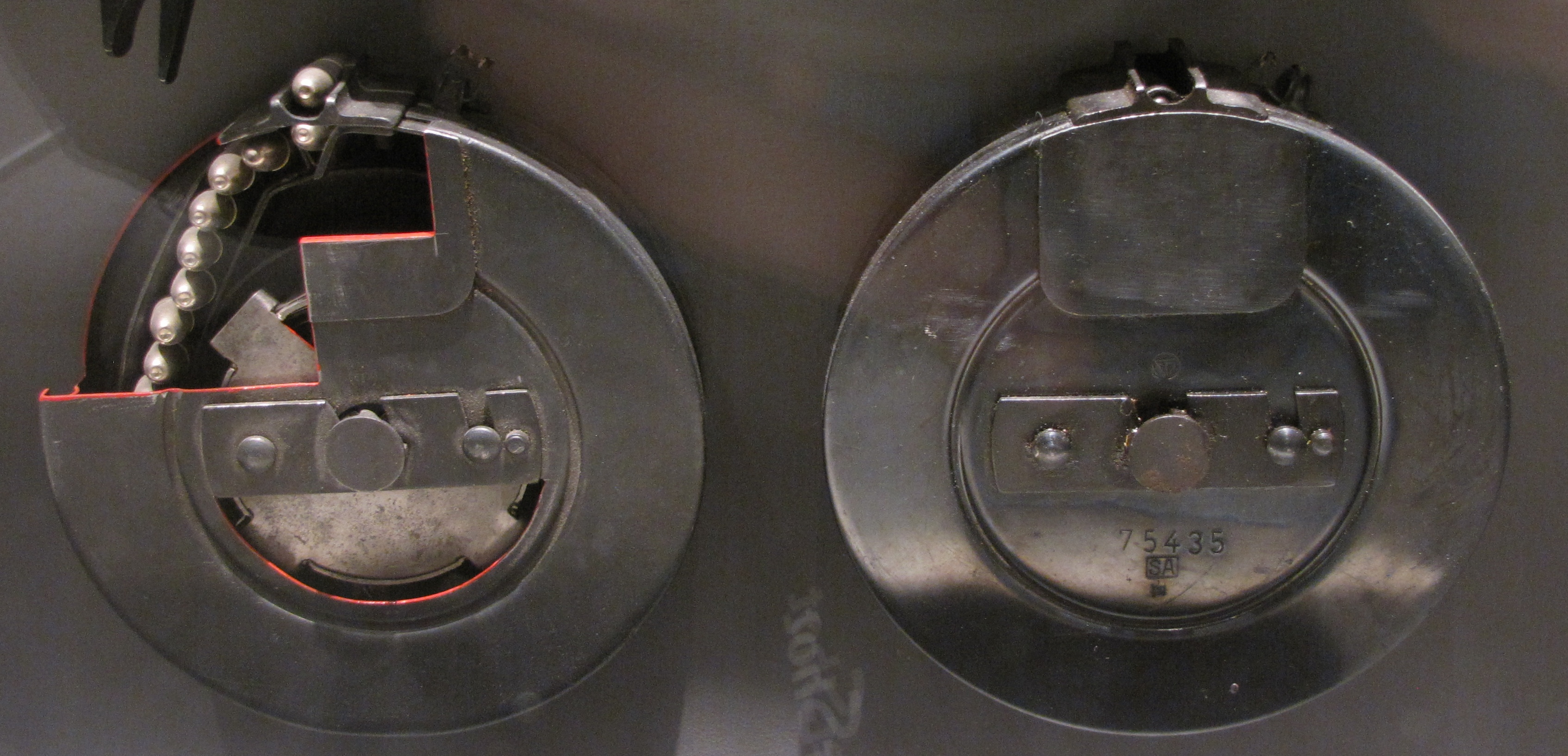
Drum magazines for the KP/-31

The Suomi KP/-31 incorporated a few new design features. It had a quick-detachable barrel system and an arrangement whereby the spring was mounted inside the bolt in order to make the gun shorter.

The Carl Gustav 50-round quad-column "casket" box magazine was lighter and more reliable than the original Lahti 40-round "ranger" drum magazine. Similar applications were used on the Argentinian Hafdasa C-4 and Italian SITES Spectre M4 submachine guns. The Russian company PUFgun makes a 5.45×39mm 60-round AK-74-compatible all-polymer coffin magazine that was based on an abandoned Izhmash prototype.

== Variants ==
A number of different options and variations were offered through the export market. Two of those were a vertical front pistol grip and a folding bipod, which could be included together or independently. The Finnish police actually bought a small number of each type, and something like 50 to 100 guns were produced and sold with both features together – like this example.

A specialized bunker version was also produced in very small numbers (a total of 500 built) in 1941, the barrel shroud end of which was thinner and flattened to allow firing through the narrow ports of defensive bunkers. This version had no shoulder stock and was equipped with a pistol grip. An even rarer version "900 kp 31 psv" was produced for use as a secondary gun in the firing ports of Vickers Alt B Type E 6-Ton tanks, but only a few dozen were built before production was canceled due to the outbreak of the Winter War. Production never resumed, as captured Degtyaryov machine guns proved far superior in this role. Like the bunker version, the tank version had a pistol grip and no buttstock, and it could be quickly removed from the tank and fitted with a standard barrel shroud for infantry use if needed. The tank version remained in the Finnish Army's inventory through the 1980s, despite the tank it was designed for being retired in 1959.

== Users ==
- Bolivia: KP/26 and KP/31
- Brazil: Commercial KP/31 with bipod, around 8 were purchased for the Special Police in the Federal District. Each of its four "shock detachments" was armed with two Suomis, two Bergmann submachine guns and two Thompsons.
- Bulgaria: 5,000 were bought from 1940 to 1942.
- Independent State of Croatia: 1,250 were bought from 1940 to 1942, of which 500 were delivered.
- (Democratic Republic of the Congo) Republic of the Congo: Ex-Swedish Husqvarnas left over from the ONUC were used as late as the 1970s.
- Denmark: 32 were bought from Finland, some Swedish m/37-39 were also purchased and 1,400 copies, designated m/41, were manufactured in the kingdom during WWII until Germany disarmed all the Danish army in August 1943.
- Egypt: Used Swedish-made kpist m/37-39s.
- Estonia: Five KP/-26 were purchased for evaluation. 485 KP-31 were delivered in September 1938.
- Finland
- France: 150 KP/-31 seized from various sources were supplied to French troops during the Phoney War.
- Indonesia: Used Swedish-made kpist m/37-39s.
- Israel: Mix of military surplus and commercial contract guns acquired from unknown sources by Haganah.
- Italian Partisans: Used examples captured from German soldiers
- Nazi Germany: 3,042 were ordered by Germany from Finland during WWII and likely issued to the Wehrmacht and SS. Also 120 Suomi KP's were presented to the German troops of AOK Norwegen in 1942 for use on the Finnish Front. Most of these weapons left Finland with German troops in 1944 and were subsequently used in other theaters of the war. Any Suomi KP's captured from Denmark designated as the Maschinenpistole 746(d)
- Norway: Swedish m/37-39 variant used by police troops in Sweden.
- Paraguay
- Poland: 20 delivered to police in 1933 and issued until 1939
- Spain: Used by both sides during the Spanish Civil War
- Soviet Union: Used captured weapons. A copy in 7.62×25mm Tokarev was produced in Leningrad as the Karelo-Finskii KF-42.
- Sweden: 35,000 made under license by Husqvarna Vapenfabriks AB just before and during World War II, some were also imported from Finland. Designated kpist m/37 (9mm Browning Long caliber) after the year of adaption. In 1939 Sweden decided to switch to 9 mm Parabellum and the new weapons were designated kpist m/37-39.
- Switzerland: 100 KP/-41 delivered (of 5,000 ordered) and designated MP 43. 22,500 produced under license by Hispano-Suiza as MP 43/44.
- Vatican City: Pontifical Swiss Guard used the Hispano-Suiza version until the 1970s.

== Gallery ==
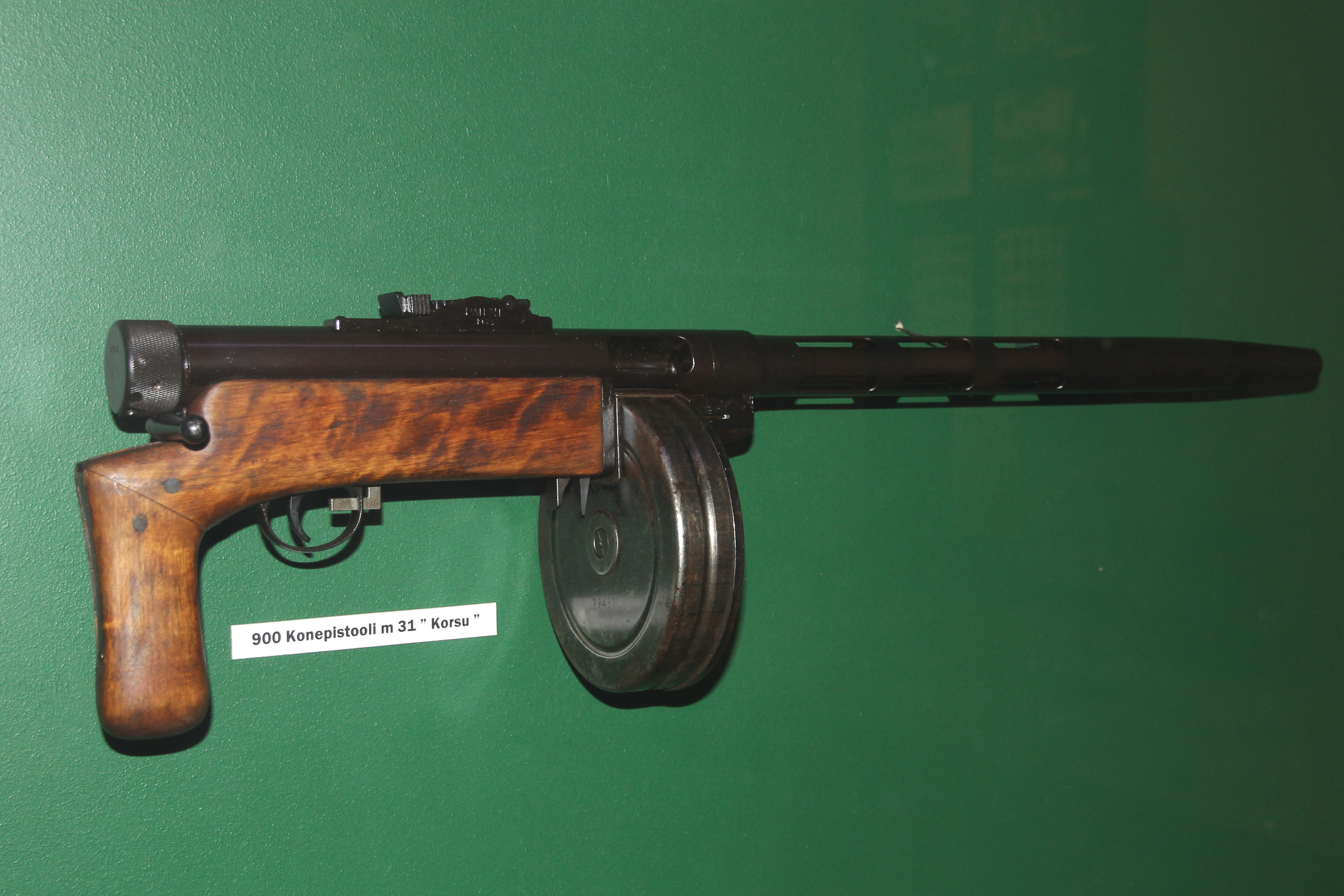
Bunker model KP/-31

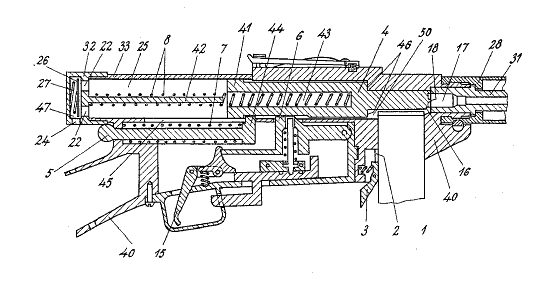
Internal drawing of the Suomi from the original patent

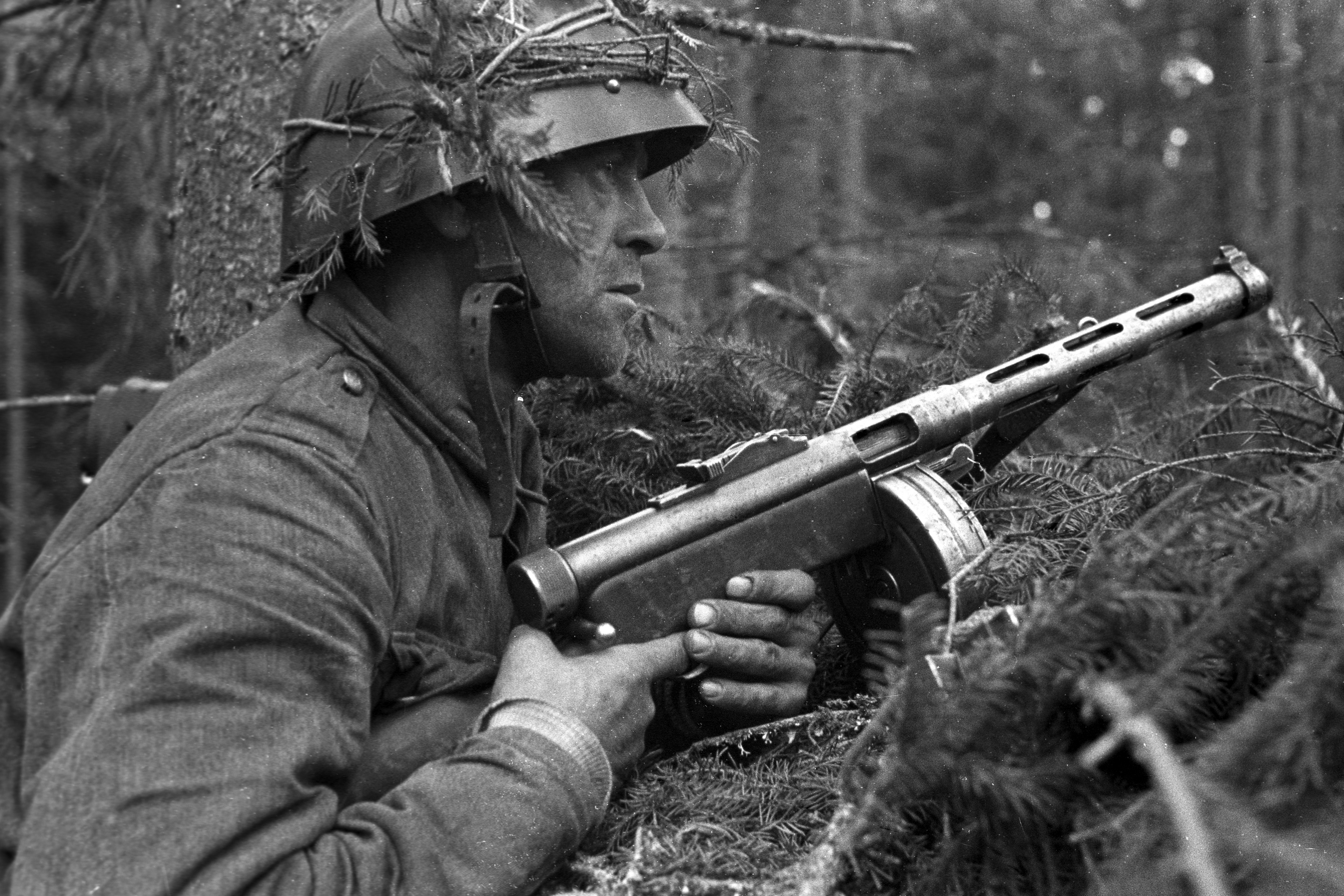
A Finnish sub-machinegunner during the Battle of Vuosalmi in Karelian Isthmus

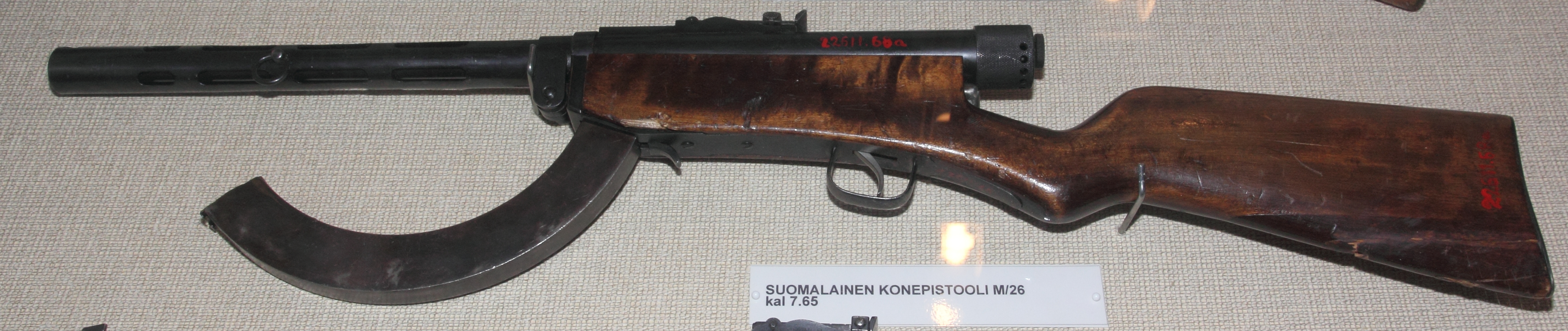
Early 7.65 mm Suomi KP/-26

== See also ==
- List of submachine guns
