= Marszałkowska 76 Office Center =

Office building in Warsaw, Poland

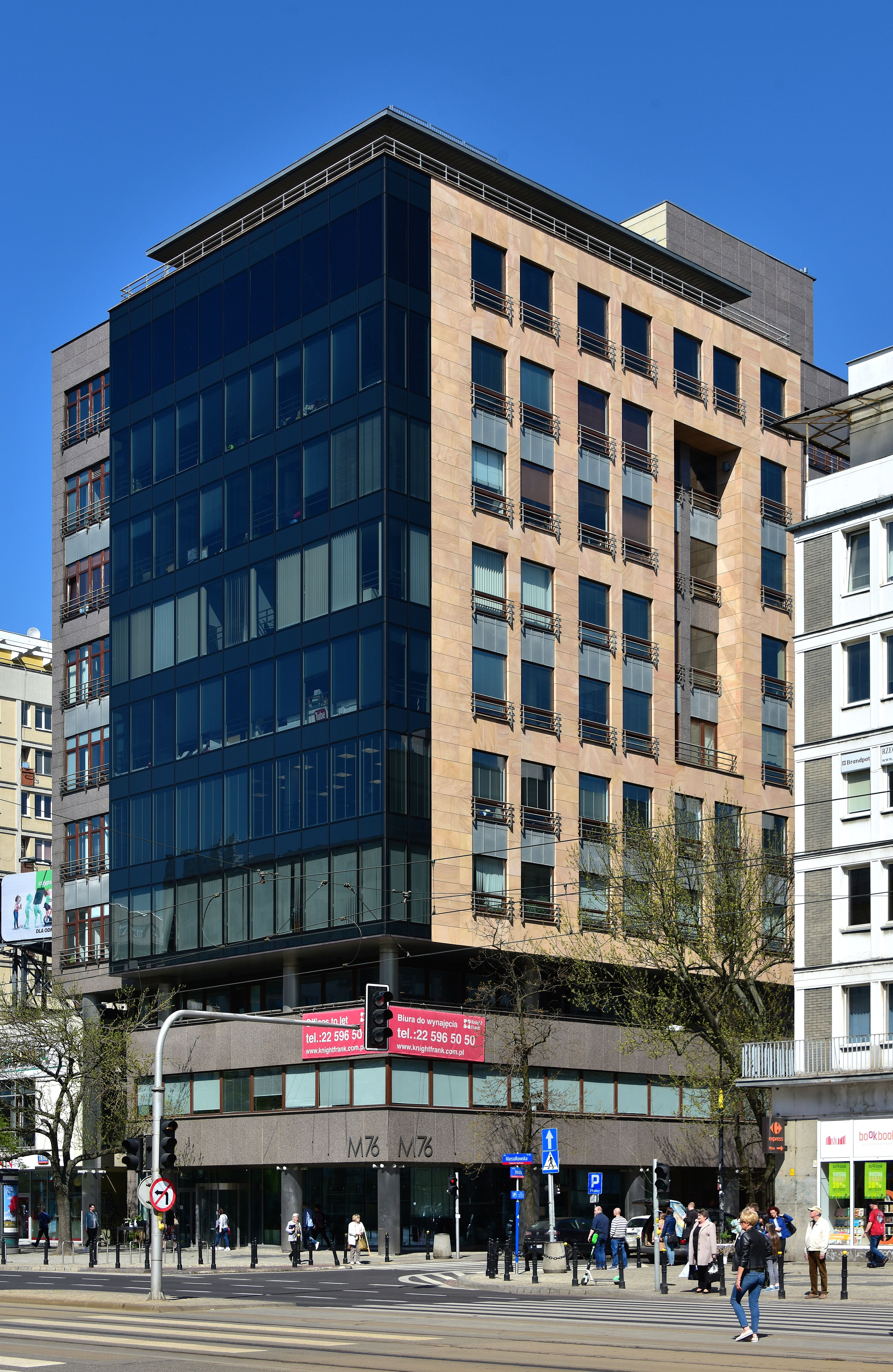
- The building in 2019.
- Interactive map of the Marszałkowska 76 Office Center area

General information
- Type: Tenement house
- Location: Downtown, Warsaw, Poland, 76 Marshal Street
- Coordinates: 52°13′35.0″N 21°00′51.5″E
- Completed: 2002

Technical details
- Floor count: 11
- Floor area: 8220 m^{2}

Design and construction
- Architect: Waldemar Szczerba
- Developer: SAP-Projekt
- Main contractor: Budexport

The Marszałkowska 76 Office Center (M76; Polish pronunciation: [mar.ʂawˈkɔf.ska]) is an office building in Warsaw, Poland, at 76 Marszałkowska Street, at the corner of Hoża Street, within the South Downtown. It was opened in 2002.

== History ==
The building was designed by Waldemar Szczerba as an investment of SAP-Projekt. It was built in 2002 with Budexport as the main contractor. The building is used as a recording studio of morning show Good Morning TVN.

== Design ==
The building stands on a parcel with size of 614 m^{2}, with a total floor area of 8220 m^{2}, of which 6000 m^{2} is dedicated to office spaces. It has 11 storeys with additional two underground levels. Its façade is lied in sandstone and granite panels with mahogany wood window frames, and a wall of glass panels on the side of Marszałkowska Street.
