= Tikka (brand) =

Finnish industrial business

- Type: Subsidiary
- Industry: Firearms, consumer durables
- Founded: 1893
- Fate: Merged into SAKO in 1983
- Headquarters: Tikkakoski, Jyväskylä, Finland
- Parent: SAKO
- Website: www.sako.global/tikka

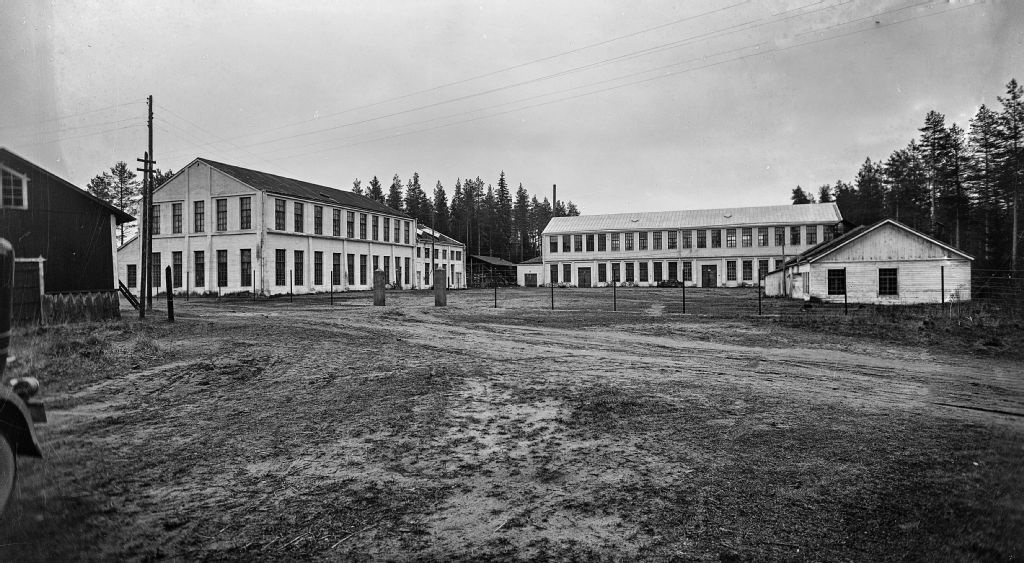
Tikkakoski factory in the 1930s.

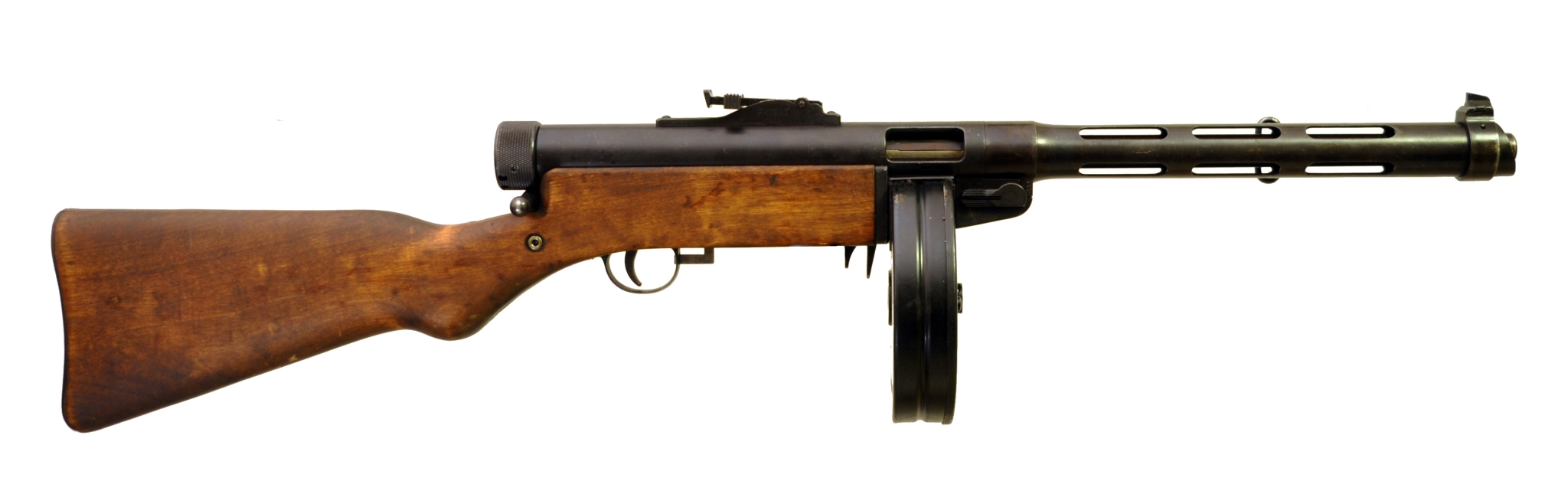
The Suomi KP/-31 submachine gun was produced by Tikkakoski.

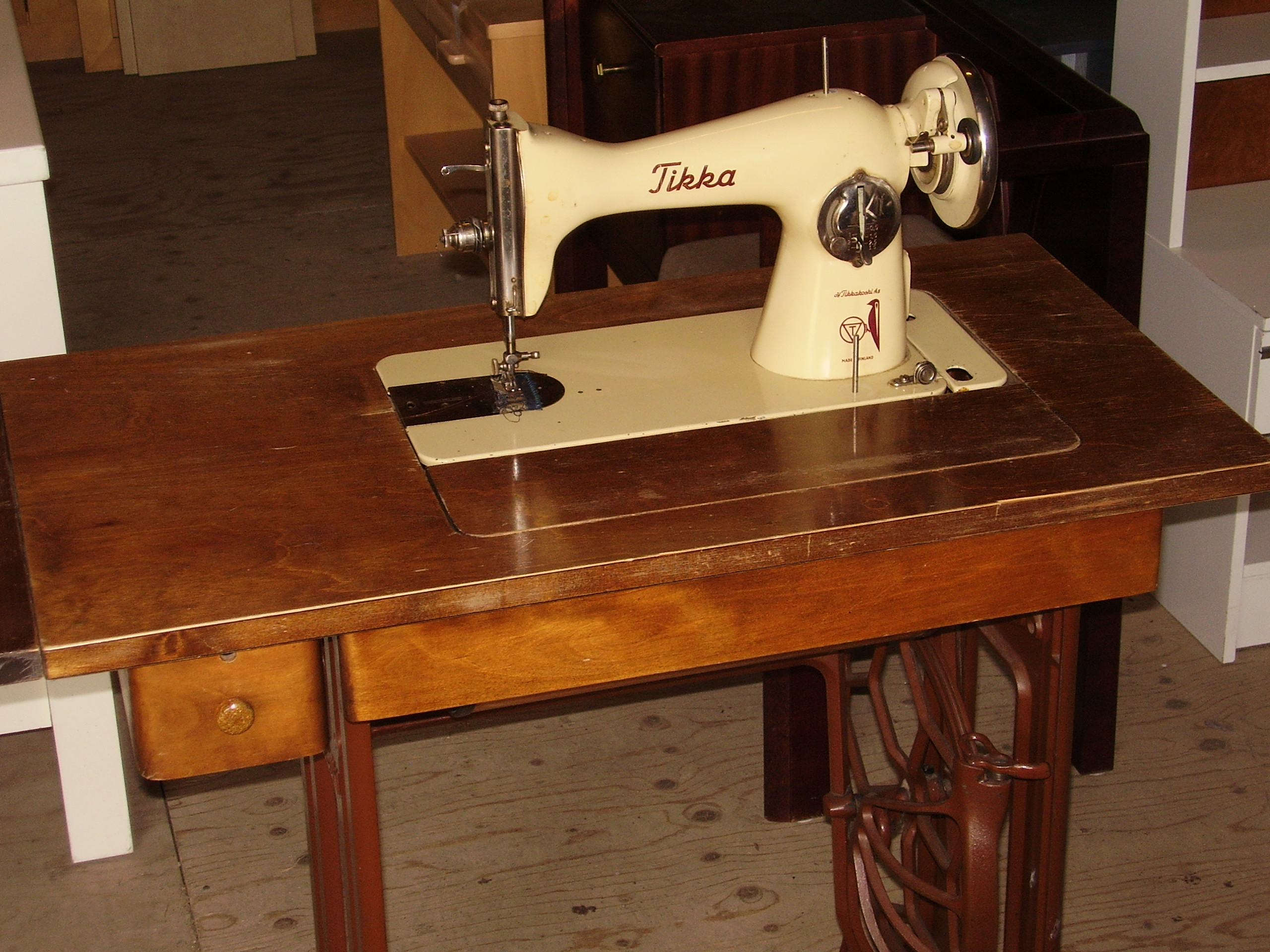
Tikka sewing machine 1951

Oy Tikkakoski Ab was a Finnish company producing firearms and different consumer durables, most notably sewing machines. It was named after the Tikkakoski district in Jyväskylä, Central Finland where their factory was located. Their most known products were sold under the Tikka brand, which was purchased by SAKO in 1983.

== History ==
The company was founded by Martin Stenij as a metal workshop next to the Jyväsjoki mill and saw, but experienced several bankruptcies and changes in ownership as a result. From 1927 to 1940 the company made the M27 rifle, a rebuild of the Mosin-Nagant for the Finnish Army. In 1930, the company was purchased by a German armsdealer Willi Daugs and the next year the production of the Suomi KP/-31 submachine gun was started. After 1933, Tikkakoski also produced machine gun ammo belts and the Maxim M/09-21.

During World War II, they manufactured the aforementioned submachine and machine guns and gun barrels. They also produced .50 Browning and 20×138mmB Solothurn Long ammunition.

After the war, Tikkakoski was considered to be a German-owned company and its assets were confiscated for the Soviet Union in 1947, discontinuing firearms production and focusing on sewing machines. Finnish businessmen however bought the company from the Soviets in 1957.

Tikkakoski was merged into the other Finnish firearms manufacturer SAKO in 1983 to form Oy Sako-Tikka Ab. Later, Tikkakoski was omitted from the company name but SAKO continues to use the Tikka brand for a series of rifles, mostly the T3X model. SAKO's merger with Valmet to form Sako-Valmet in 1986 led to the closure of Tikkakoski's arms division in 1987.

== See also ==
- List of sewing machine brands
